= War in Donbas =

2014–2022 war between Ukraine and Russia

- Part of the Russo-Ukrainian War
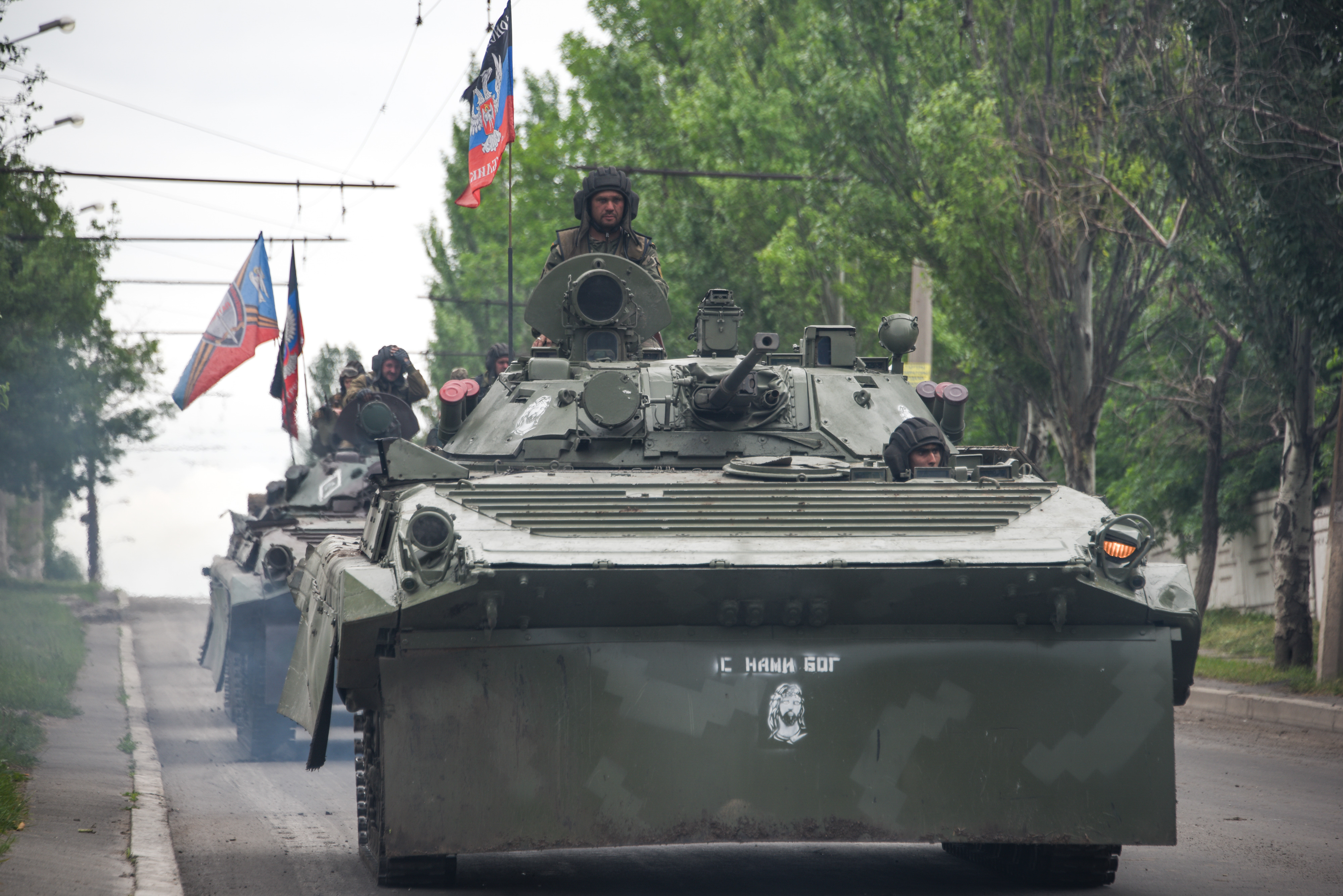
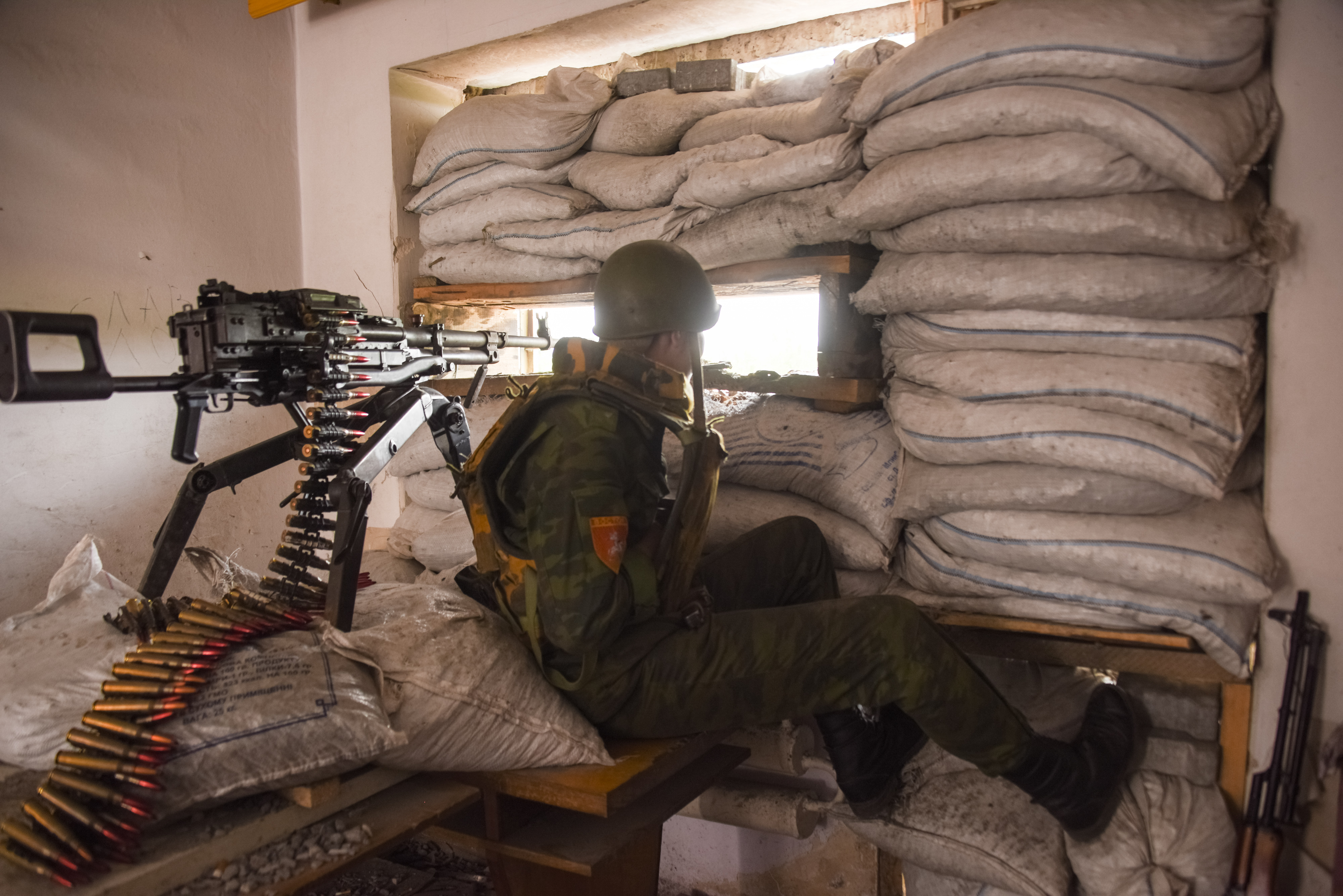
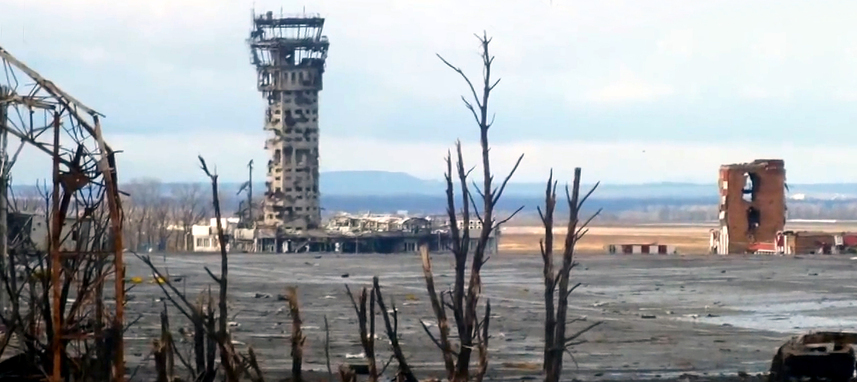
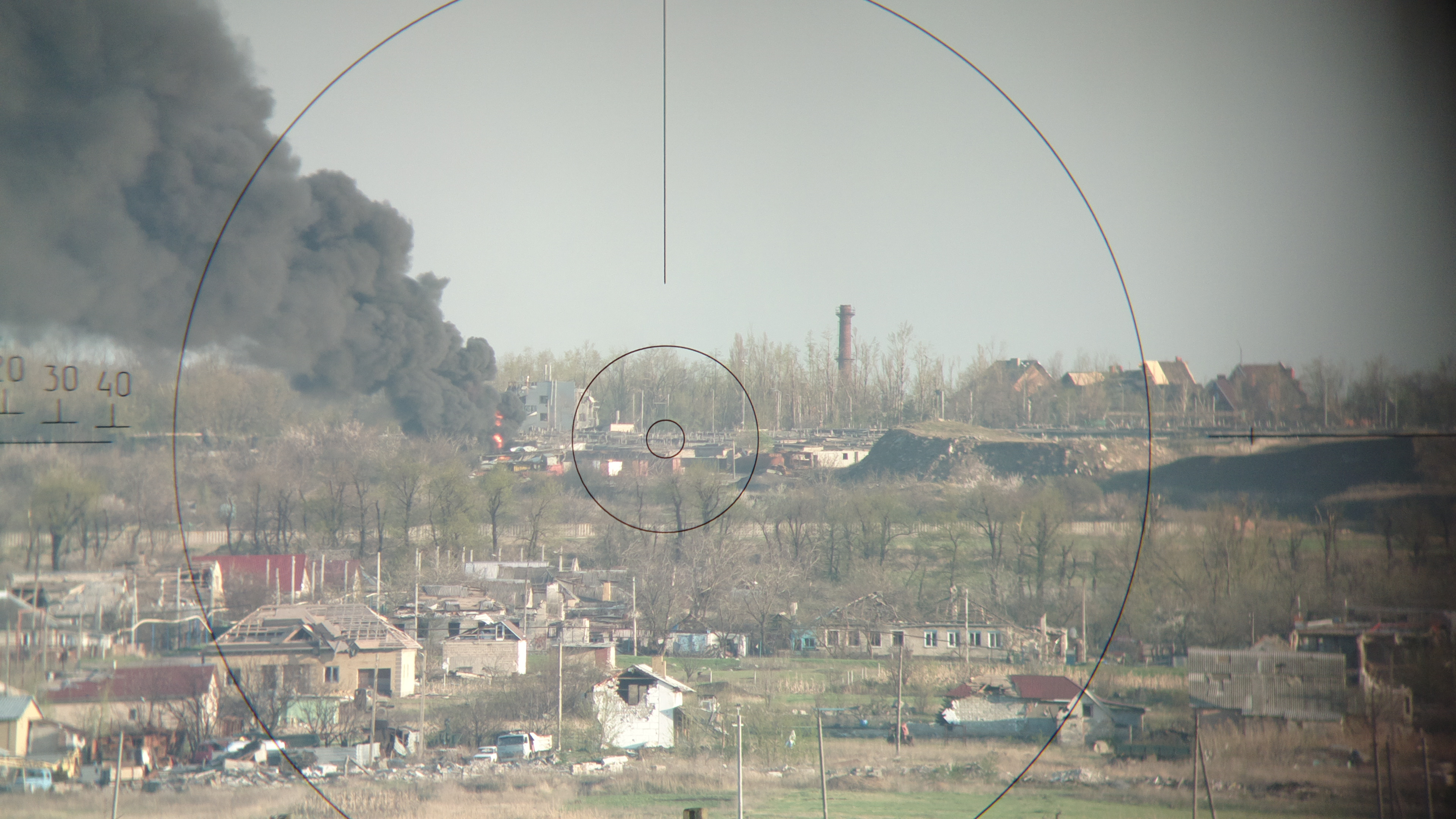
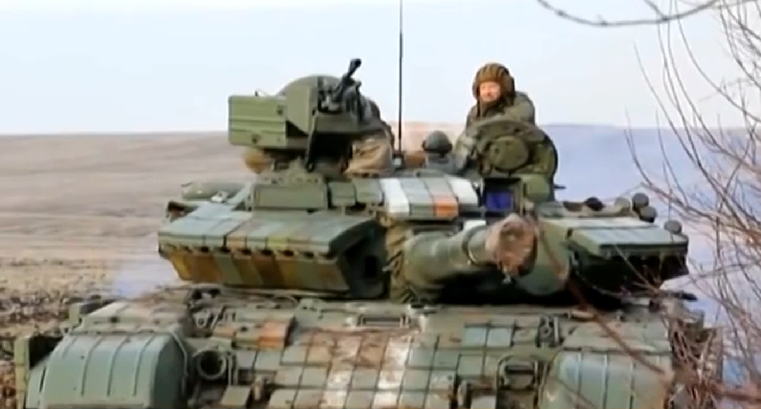
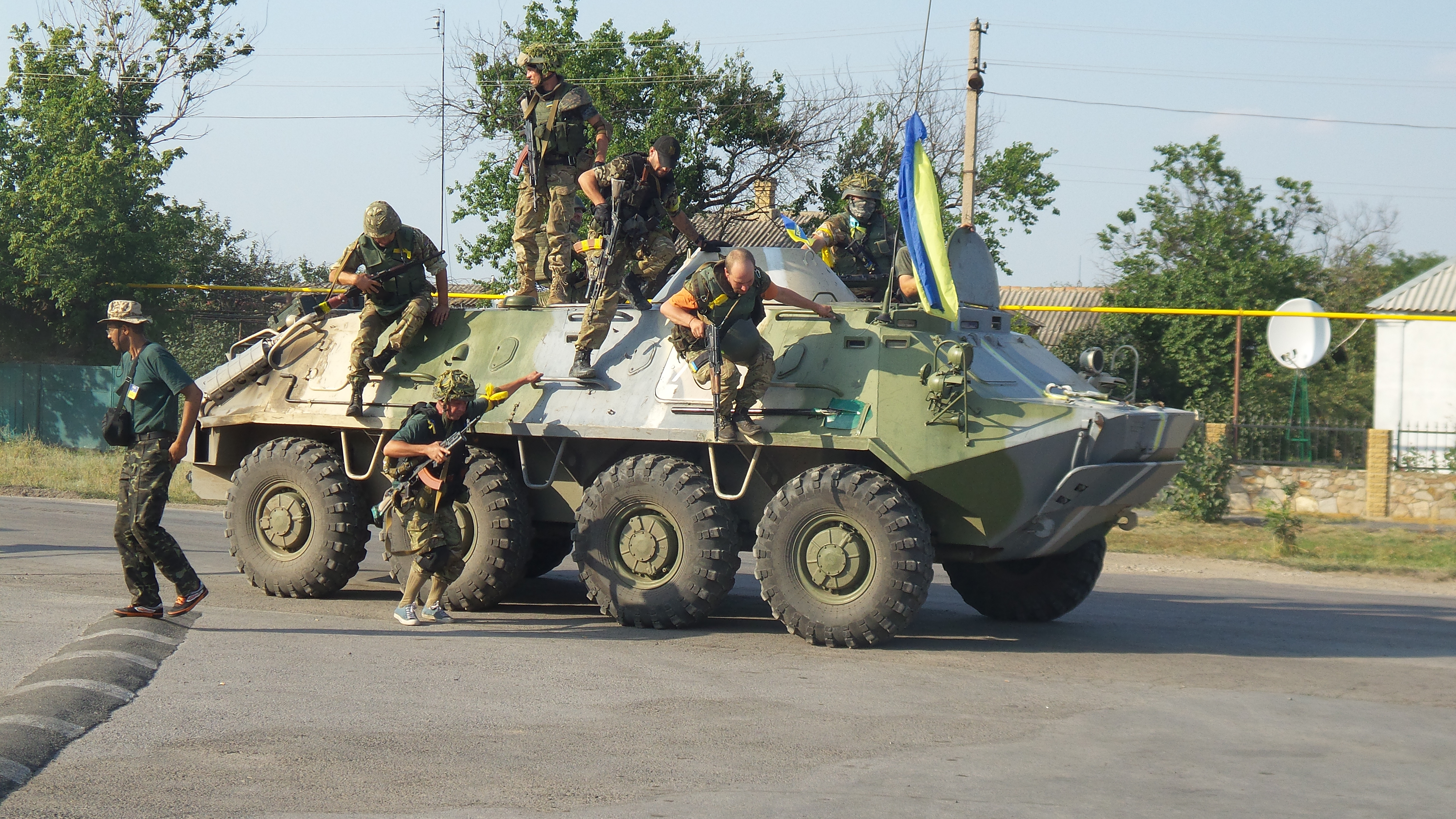
- Top row: Pro-Russian paramilitaries in Donbas. Middle: Aftermath of the Battle of Donetsk Airport; damaged buildings in Spartak. Bottom: Ukrainian T-64BV tank during the Battle of Debaltseve; Donbas Battalion soldiers on a BTR-60 in the Donbas, August 2014.
Date	12 April 2014 – 24 February 2022 (Note: War escalated as Russia invaded Ukraine in full on 24 February 2022; however the term "war in Donbas" is not generally used for events occurring after the full-scale invasion started.) (7 years, 10 months, 2 weeks and 4 days)
Location	Donetsk and Luhansk oblasts, Ukraine
Status	Subsumed by the Russo-Ukrainian war (as part of the Eastern front of the Russian invasion of Ukraine)
Territorial changes	Russian-controlled separatists established two widely unrecognised republics in parts of Donetsk and Luhansk oblasts.

Belligerents
Russia; Donetsk PR (Note: The Donetsk People's Republic and the Luhansk People's Republic, which were Russian-controlled puppet states, declared their independence from Ukraine in May 2014. Amid the full-scale invasion of Ukraine, Russia formally announced the annexation of both entities on 30 September 2022.); Luhansk PR	Ukraine

Commanders and leaders
Vladimir Putin; (Russia) Alexander Borodai; (Russia) Igor Girkin; (Donetsk People's Republic) Denis Pushilin; (Donetsk People's Republic) Alexander Zakharchenko X; (Donetsk People's Republic) Pavel Gubarev; (Luhansk People's Republic) Leonid Pasechnik; (Luhansk People's Republic) Igor Plotnitsky; (Luhansk People's Republic) Valery Bolotov X	Volodymyr Zelenskyy; Petro Poroshenko; Oleksandr Turchynov

Units involved
Russia (details); Russian Armed Forces; Foreign volunteers; (Donetsk People's Republic) (Luhansk People's Republic) Pro-Russian separatists (details); DPR People's Militia; LPR People's Militia	Ukraine (details); Ukrainian Armed Forces; Air Force; Ground Forces; Territorial defence battalions; Security Service; Internal Affairs Ministry; Militsiya; National Police; National Guard; Volunteer battalions

Strength
40,000–45,000 fighters; 9,000–12,000 Russian soldiers	64,000 troops

Casualties and losses
6,500 killed^{[*]}; 15,800–16,200 wounded	4,535 killed; 70 missing; 13,800–14,200 wounded
- 3,404 civilians killed (365 in 2016–2021); 14,200–14,400 killed; 51,000–54,000 wounded overall; 1.6 million Ukrainians internally displaced; over 1 million fled abroad as of March 2016
- ^{*} Includes 400–500 Russian servicemen (per the United States Department of State, March 2015)

The war in Donbas, (Note: Ukrainian: Війна на Донбасі, romanized: Viina na Donbasi Russian: Война в Донбассе, romanized: Voyna v Donbasse) also called the Donbas war, was a phase of the Russo-Ukrainian war in the eastern Donbas region of Ukraine. The war began in April 2014, when Russian-backed paramilitaries began an uprising against the Ukrainian government, seized territory and declared independent states. Ukraine's military launched an operation against them, but failed to fully retake the territory. Covertly, Russia's military were directly involved, and the separatists were largely under Russian control. This phase ended when the war was subsumed by the full-scale Russian invasion of Ukraine in 2022.

In March 2014, following Ukraine's Revolution of Dignity, Russia occupied Crimea. Anti-revolution and pro-Russian protests began in Ukraine's Donetsk and Luhansk provinces, collectively 'the Donbas'. On 12 April, a commando unit led by Russian citizen Igor 'Strelkov' Girkin crossed the border from Russia and seized Sloviansk and other settlements in the Donbas. Separatists declared the Donetsk and Luhansk republics (DPR and LPR) as independent states. Russia covertly supported them with soldiers and weaponry. It only admitted sending "military specialists", but later acknowledged the separatists as Russian combat veterans. On 15 April, Ukraine began an "Anti-Terrorist Operation" (ATO). By August 2014, Ukraine had re-taken most of its territory. Russia reacted by covertly sending troops, tanks and artillery into the Donbas, helping pro-Russian forces regain much of what they had lost. DPR leader Alexander Borodai said 50,000 Russian citizens had fought for the separatists by mid-2015, excluding the regular Russian troops that invaded.

The Minsk agreement was signed in September 2014. There was to be a ceasefire monitored by the OSCE; release of prisoners; withdrawal of illegal armed groups and foreign soldiers from Ukraine; withdrawal of heavy weaponry; elections in the Donbas under Ukrainian law; and granting self-governance ("special status") to rebel-held territories. On 16 September, Ukraine passed a law to grant this self-governance and schedule elections there for December. However, the separatists held their own elections in November, which violated the Minsk agreement. The ceasefire was also broken, and Russian-backed forces began an assault on Donetsk Airport, eventually capturing it in January 2015. A new ceasefire, Minsk II, was agreed on 12 February 2015. Immediately after, Russian forces renewed their offensive on Debaltseve and forced Ukraine's military to withdraw. Both sides fortified their position by building networks of trenches, bunkers and tunnels, resulting in static trench warfare. Donbas remained a war zone, with dozens killed monthly. OSCE observers documented military convoys crossing from Russia covertly, and by the end of 2017 had counted around 30,000 people in military gear crossing from Russia at the two border checkpoints it was allowed to monitor.

All sides agreed to the "Steinmeier formula" for ending the war in October 2019. Following a ceasefire and withdrawal of foreign soldiers, elections would be held under Ukrainian law and, if the OSCE deemed these free and fair, then the Donbas territories would be given "special status" and re-integrated into Ukraine. The Ukrainian side demanded control of its border and the right of internally displaced Ukrainians to return to the Donbas to vote. The Donbas separatists said they would not withdraw or disarm, refused to give up control of the border, and said they would seek integration with Russia. The Russian state continued to deny that its military was in the Donbas, insisting that elections be held while Russian and Russian-backed forces still controlled the territory and the border. During 2021, Russia's proxies stepped up their attacks as Russian forces massed near Ukraine's borders. Russia recognised the DPR and LPR as independent states on 21 February 2022 and deployed "peacekeeping" troops there. On 24 February, Russia began a full-scale invasion of Ukraine, subsuming the Donbas war into it.

About 14,000 people were killed in the war: 6,500 Russian and Russian proxy forces, 4,400 Ukrainian forces, and 3,400 civilians on both sides. Most civilian casualties were in the first year. In 2011, Luhansk and Donetsk oblasts had a combined population of 6.1 million. As a result of the Donbas war, 2 million fled the region.

== Background ==
Despite being recognised as an independent country since 1991, as a former USSR constituent republic, Ukraine was perceived by the leadership of Russia as part of its sphere of influence. In a 2002 paper Taras Kuzio stated "While accepting Ukrainian independence, Putin has sought to draw Ukraine into a closer relationship. This approach has been acceptable to eastern Ukrainian oligarchs, who do not harbour anti-Russian feelings".

In 2011, Kuzio stated:

The traditional Soviet policy of dividing eastern against western Ukrainians, then "bourgeois nationalists" and now "crazy Galicians", remains in place. This tactic was deliberately employed by the Yanukovych administration is promoting a strategy of regional divide-and-rule through polarisation, using 9 May–style provocations, to maintain its eastern Ukrainian electorate permanently mobilised.

Analysts have stated that as of February 2014, Russia was able to:

- Control and manipulate the price of gas shipments to Ukraine's disadvantage (in the past few years, it had twice turned off the flow of gas to the country to force the hands of Ukrainian leaders);
- Arbitrarily impose trade restrictions on Ukrainian exports;
- Flood Ukraine with television propaganda highlighting alleged Western interference in Ukraine's internal affairs;
- Stir up secessionist sentiment in Russian-speaking areas such as Crimea and Donetsk.

The Ukrainian state has also alleged infiltration of its security services by Russian state operatives in the lead-up to the events of 2014.

According to the Institute of Modern Russia, the Kremlin also maintained a tight hold on Ukraine's president, Viktor Yanukovych.

=== Ukrainian revolution ===
In November 2013, the 'Euromaidan' protests began in response to Yanukovych's sudden decision to abandon a political association and free trade agreement with the European Union (EU), instead choosing closer ties to Russia. Earlier that year, Ukraine's parliament had overwhelmingly approved finalising the agreement with the EU. Russia had put pressure on Ukraine to reject it. The scope of the protests widened, with calls for Yanukovych's resignation. Protesters opposed what they saw as government corruption and abuse of power, oligarchic sway, police brutality and human rights violations. On 28 January 2014, Ukraine's government resigned. The protests climaxed on 18–20 February 2014 with clashes in Kyiv between protesters and Berkut special riot police, in which 108 protesters were killed; most of them were shot by snipers. On 21 February, President Yanukovych and the opposition signed an agreement to bring about an interim unity government, early elections, and urgent constitutional changes (which needed to be signed by the president). However, Yanukovych secretly fled the city that evening. The next day, parliament voted to remove him from office. About 73% of the parliament and members of all parties voted to remove him, including members of his own party. On 27 February, an interim government was established and early presidential elections were scheduled. This series of events became known as the Revolution of Dignity.

Immediately following the revolution, unmarked Russian troops occupied the Ukrainian territory of Crimea. After an illegal referendum, Crimea was annexed by Russia.

=== Protests in the Donbas ===
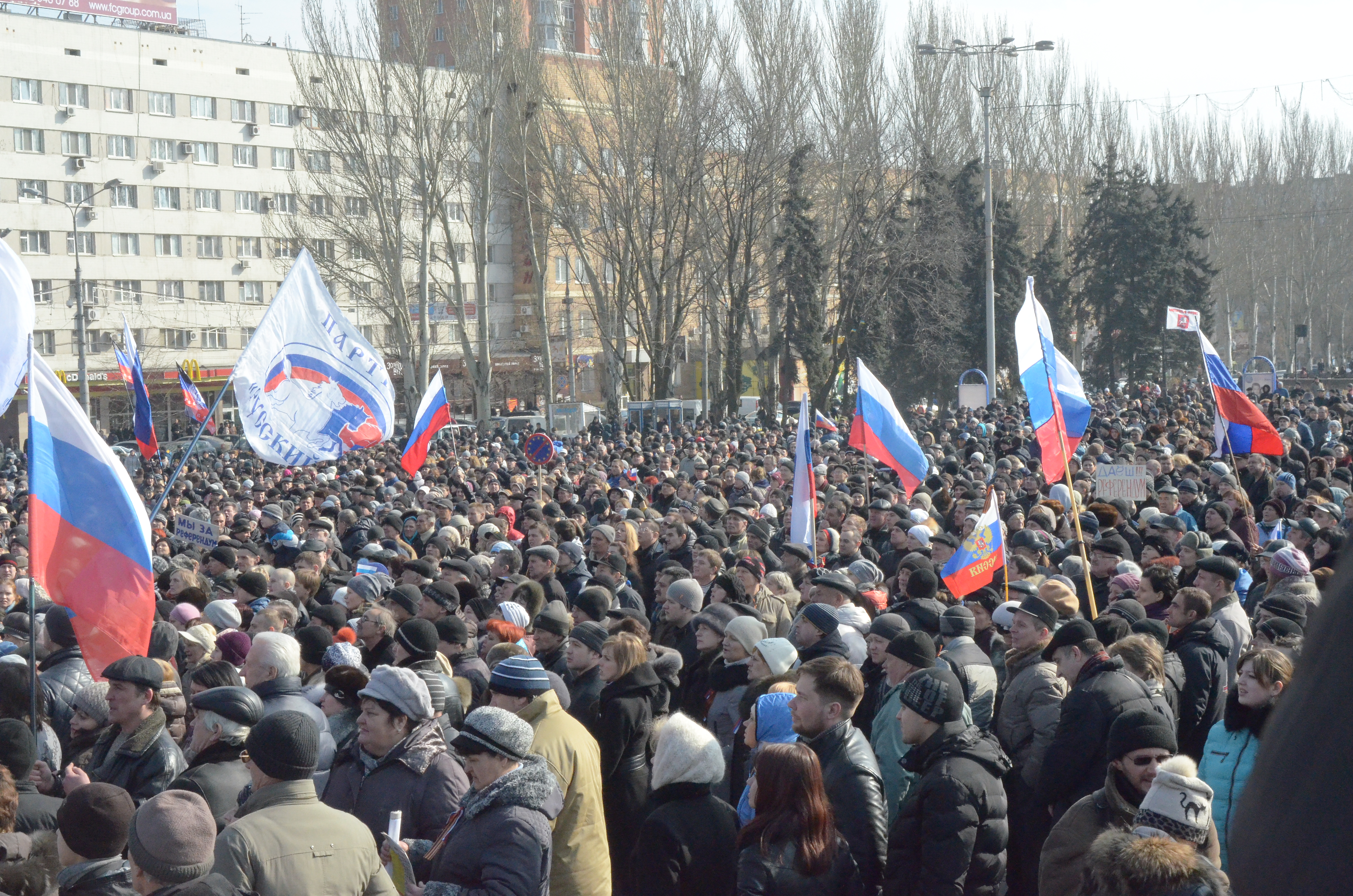
Pro-Russian protesters in Donetsk, 9 March 2014

Following the revolution, counter-revolutionary and pro-Russian protests began in parts of the Donbas. In the last census, the population of the Donbas was about 58% ethnic Ukrainian and 38% ethnic Russian overall: Donetsk Oblast was 57% Ukrainian and 38% Russian, while Luhansk Oblast was 58% Ukrainian and 39% Russian. A national survey held in March–April 2014 found that 58% of respondents in the Donbas wanted autonomy within Ukraine and 31% wanted secession.

The Donbas was the region most strongly supportive of Yanukovych and his Party of Regions. People in the Donbas mostly consumed Russian-based media, which portrayed Ukraine's new interim government as an illegitimate "fascist junta" and that ethnic Russians were in imminent danger. Leaked e-mails and telephone calls later revealed that the Russian state had funded and organized separatists, mainly through Kremlin advisers Vladislav Surkov and Sergey Glazyev.

Pro-Russian protesters occupied the Donetsk Regional State Administration Building from 1 to 6 March 2014, until the SBU removed them. Pavel Gubarev was proclaimed "people's governor" of Donetsk Oblast and Aleksandr Kharitonov "people's governor" of Luhansk Oblast. Ukrainian authorities arrested local separatist leaders in early March. They were replaced by figures linked to the Russian security services. Political scientist Taras Kuzio wrote that Russia transformed the protesters "into armed insurgents; this was never an organic process".

On 6 April, 1,000–2,000 demonstrators in Donetsk demanded a referendum on autonomy or accession to Russia, similar to the one held in Crimea in March. Hundreds of masked men seized weapons from the SBU building in the city, and a large crowd stormed and occupied the Donetsk RSA building, raising the Russian flag. They demanded the regional council vote for a referendum on joining Russia the next day, vowing to otherwise take control of the regional government with a "people's mandate", dismissing all elected regional councillors and members of parliament. As these demands were not met, the following day the activists proclaimed the Donetsk People's Republic (DPR) as an independent state.

Unrest also began in Luhansk on 6 April, when hundreds of protesters besieged the SBU headquarters for six hours, demanding the release of anti-government militants held there. They eventually stormed and occupied the building, releasing prisoners and seizing weapons.

The Minister of Internal Affairs, Arsen Avakov, said on 9 April 2014 the separatist occupation of Ukrainian government buildings in the Donbas would be ended within 48 hours, by negotiation or force, declaring, "we are ready for both". Acting President Oleksandr Turchynov had already ordered the seized Donetsk regional administration building placed "under state protection", and offered amnesty to separatists who disarmed and surrendered. On 11 April, Prime Minister Arseniy Yatsenyuk was reported as saying, while he was opposed to the use of force, there are limits to everything.

== First phase of the war (2014) ==
While the initial protests were largely native expressions of discontent with the new Ukrainian government, Russia took advantage of them to launch a coordinated political and military campaign against Ukraine. Russian citizens led the separatist movement in Donetsk from April 2014, and were supported by volunteers and materiel from Russia. As the conflict escalated in May 2014, Russia employed a "hybrid approach", deploying a combination of disinformation, irregular fighters, regular Russian troops, and conventional military support to destabilise the Donbas.

=== Militants seize towns ===
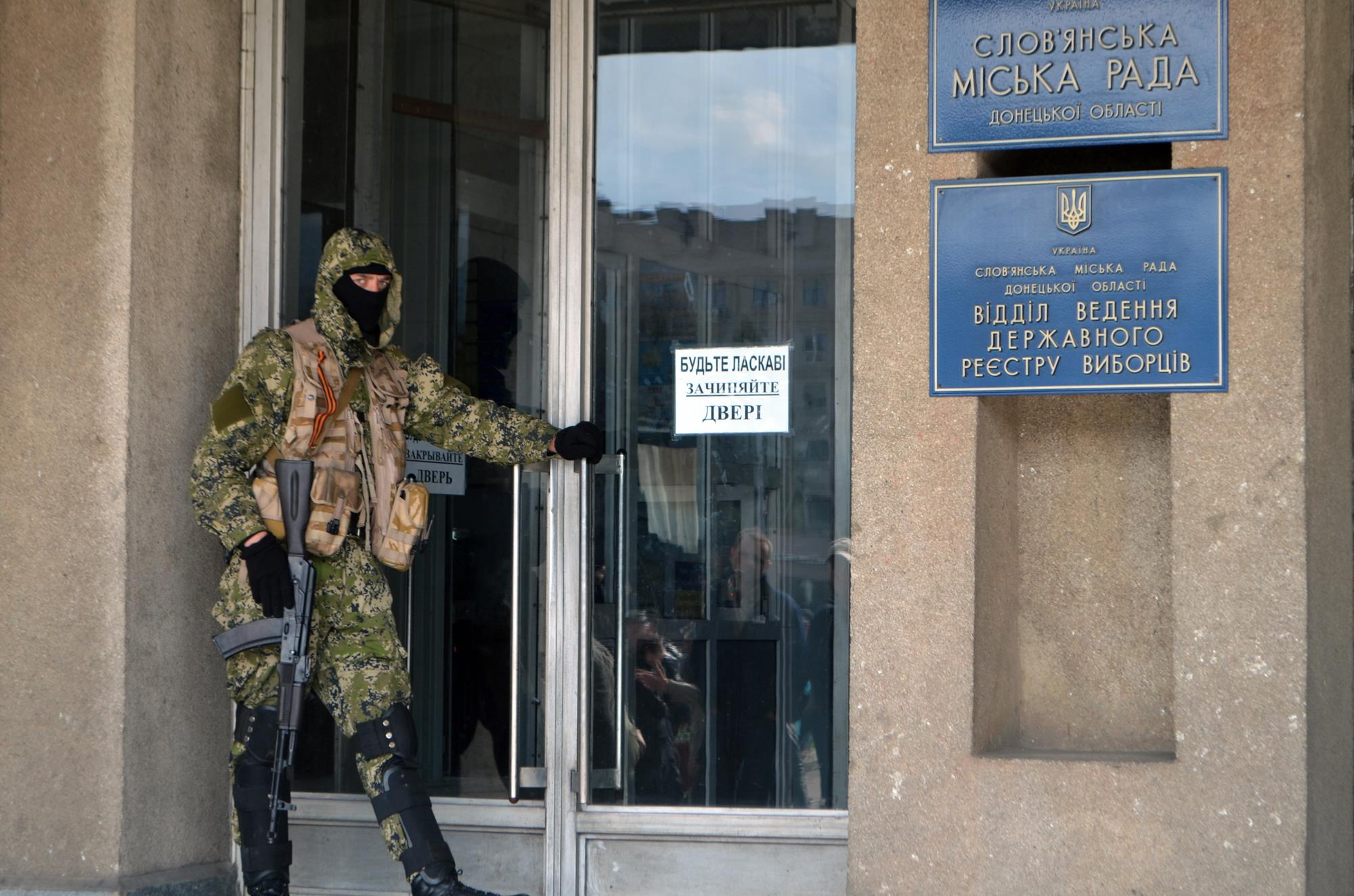
Pro-Russian paramilitaries occupying Sloviansk city council, 14 April 2014

Between 12 and 14 April 2014, Russian militants took control of government buildings in several towns and cities in Donetsk oblast, including Sloviansk, Kramatorsk, Druzhkivka, Horlivka, Mariupol, Yenakiieve, Makiivka and Zhdanivka.

==== Sloviansk ====
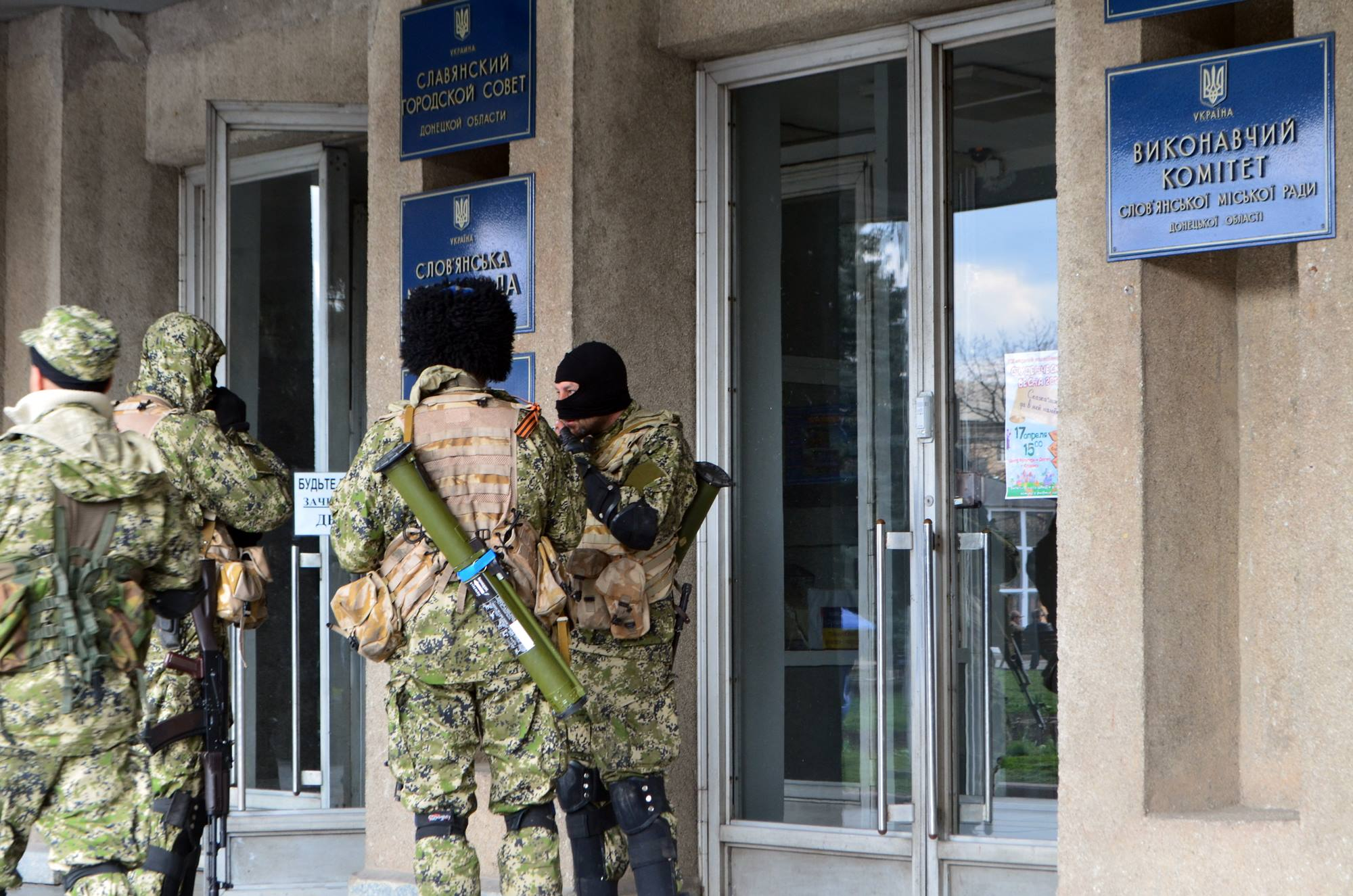
Pro-Russian insurgents occupying Sloviansk city administration building, 14 April 2014

On 12 April 2014, a heavily-armed Russian paramilitary unit crossed the border from Russia into Ukraine and seized the strategic town of Sloviansk. They attacked and occupied the town's administration building, police station, and SBU building, seized weapons, and set up roadblocks with the help of local armed activists. The militants wore no insignia and had been sent from occupied Crimea via Russia. The unit was made up of fifty Russian Armed Forces volunteers, commanded by former GRU colonel Igor 'Strelkov' Girkin, a right-wing Russian nationalist associated with the neo-imperialist movement. In an interview for Russian ultranationalist newspaper Zavtra, he said that this action sparked the war in eastern Ukraine:

"I'm the one who pulled the trigger of this war. If our unit hadn't crossed the border, everything would have fizzled out, like in Kharkiv or Odesa".

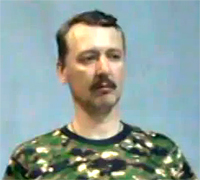
Russian commander Igor 'Strelkov' Girkin, who admitted sparking the Donbas war in April 2014

Girkin explained that "nobody there wanted to fight" until his unit seized Sloviansk.

Pro-Russian militants unlawfully detained journalists (including American Simon Ostrovsky), local civilians, and the elected mayor, Nelya Shtepa. On 25 April, they kidnapped eight OSCE observers and held them captive, claiming they were "NATO spies". The militants also carried out several summary executions. Girkin later took responsibility for these.

According to Serhiy Kudelia in Seize the City, Undo the State: The Inception of Russia's War on Ukraine, "None of the local activists who organized the first anti-Kyiv protests in Sloviansk played any prominent role once Girkin seized the town". Although some joined the paramilitaries, they were commanded by outsiders; "separatist resistance in Sloviansk was thus fully subordinated to the interests of a small group of Russian citizens acting in coordination with their Moscow chiefs".

==== Kramatorsk ====
The same day as the capture of Sloviansk, Girkin's men attacked the police station in nearby Kramatorsk, resulting in a shootout. The fighters, claiming to be members of the Donbas People's Militia, later captured the police station. They removed the police station's sign and raised the flag of the Donetsk People's Republic over the building. They then issued an ultimatum that stated that if the city's mayor and administration did not swear allegiance to the Republic by the following Monday, they would remove them from office.

==== Horlivka ====
Pro-Russian militants attempted to seize the police headquarters in Horlivka on 12 April, but were halted. Ukrainska Pravda reported that police said that the purpose of the attempted seizure was to gain access to a weapons cache. They said that they would use force if needed to defend the building from "criminals and terrorists". By 14 April militants had captured the building after a tense standoff with the police. Some members of the local police unit had defected to the Donetsk People's Republic earlier in the day, whilst the remaining officers were forced to retreat, allowing the insurgents to take control of the building.

The local chief of police was captured and badly beaten by the insurgents. A Horlivka city council deputy, Volodymyr Rybak, was kidnapped by masked men believed to be pro-Russian militants on 17 April. His body was later found in a river in occupied Sloviansk on 22 April. The city administration building was seized on 30 April, solidifying separatist control over Horlivka.

==== Other settlements ====
Other smaller towns, as well as government buildings, were seized by Russian-backed militants in the Donbas.

In Artemivsk (Bakhmut) on 12 April, separatists failed to capture the local Ministry of Internal Affairs office, but instead captured the city administration building and raised the DPR flag over it. The city administration buildings in Yenakiieve and Druzhkivka were also captured. Police repelled an attack by pro-Russian militants upon an office of the Ministry of Internal Affairs in Krasnyi Lyman on 12 April, but the building was later captured by the separatists after a skirmish. Insurgents affiliated with the Donbas People's Militia occupied a regional administration building in Khartsyzk on 13 April, followed by a local administration building in Zhdanivka on 14 April.

On 12 April, unmarked pro-Russian militants seized the Donetsk headquarters of the Interior Ministry and two police stations without resistance, while an assault on the general prosecutor's office was repelled. Following negotiations between the militants and those in the building, the chief of the office resigned from his post. According to anonymous witnesses, some militants wore uniforms of the Berkut special police force, which had been dissolved by the new government following the February revolution. The militants also took over the municipal administration building unopposed on 16 April.

Demonstrators hoisted the DPR flag over the city administration buildings in Krasnoarmiisk and Novoazovsk on 16 April. The local administration building in Siversk was similarly captured on 18 April. Following the takeover, local police announced that they would co-operate with the activists.

=== Beginning of government "Anti-Terrorist Operation" ===
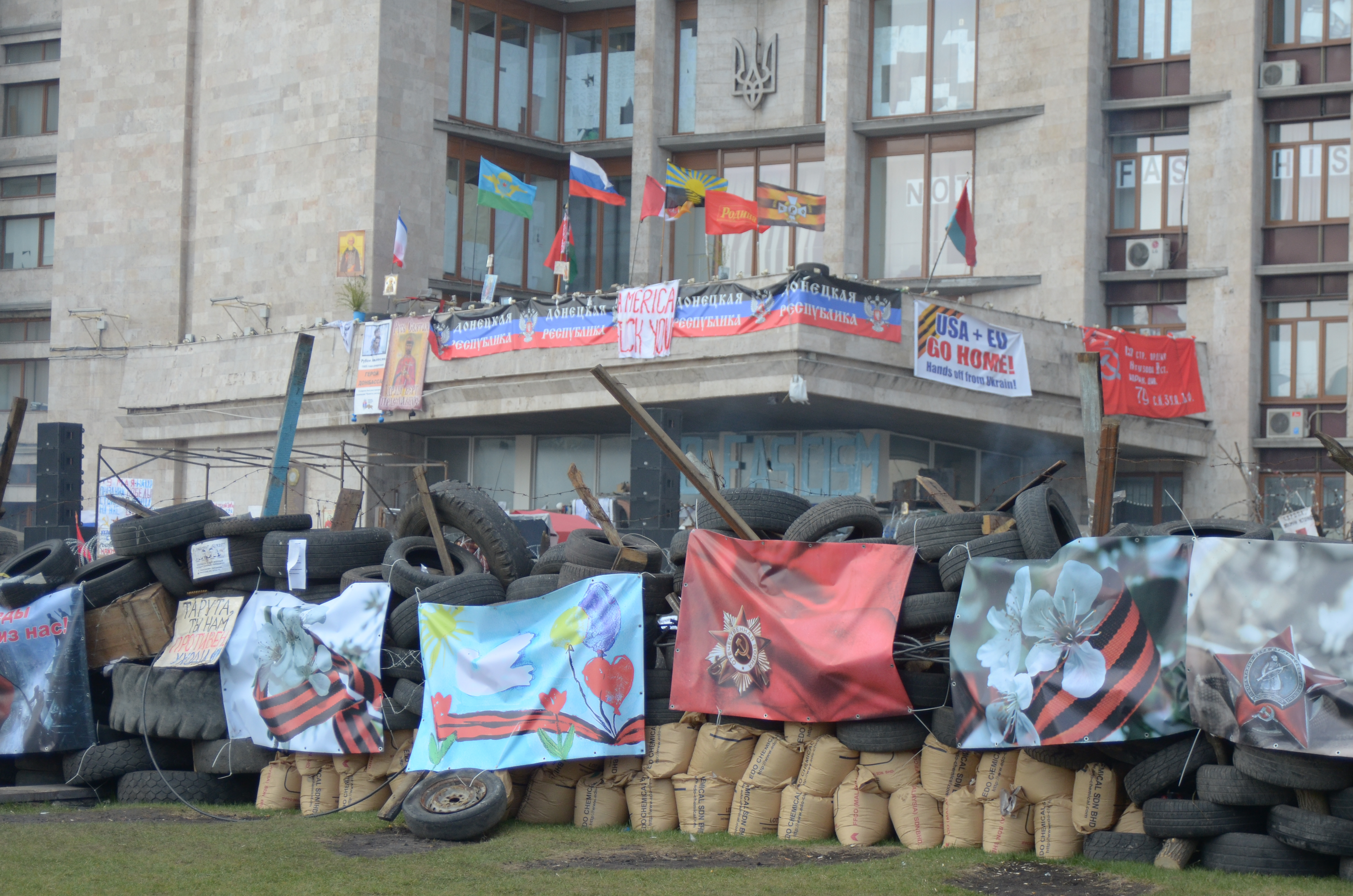
The barricade outside the Donetsk RSA with a slogan that asks the EU and US to "go home", alluding to claims of a Western intervention

The first conflict deaths in the Donbas occurred on 13 April, when the Russian paramilitaries who occupied Sloviansk fired on Ukrainian SBU officers on the city outskirts. Ukrainian Alpha Group captain Gennady Bilichenko was killed and several wounded, while at least one Russian militant was killed by return fire.

In response to the separatist takeover of Sloviansk and Kramatorsk, attacks on government forces and police stations in the Donbas, and their refusal to surrender, Turchynov announced that Ukrainian forces would launch an "Anti-Terrorist Operation" on 15 April. However, Ukrainian forces were poorly prepared, and the operation soon stalled. Russian paramilitary commander Igor Strelkov said that Ukrainian forces were "extremely cautious" at first, as Russian troops were massed on Ukraine's border and the Ukrainians were unsure how Russia would respond.

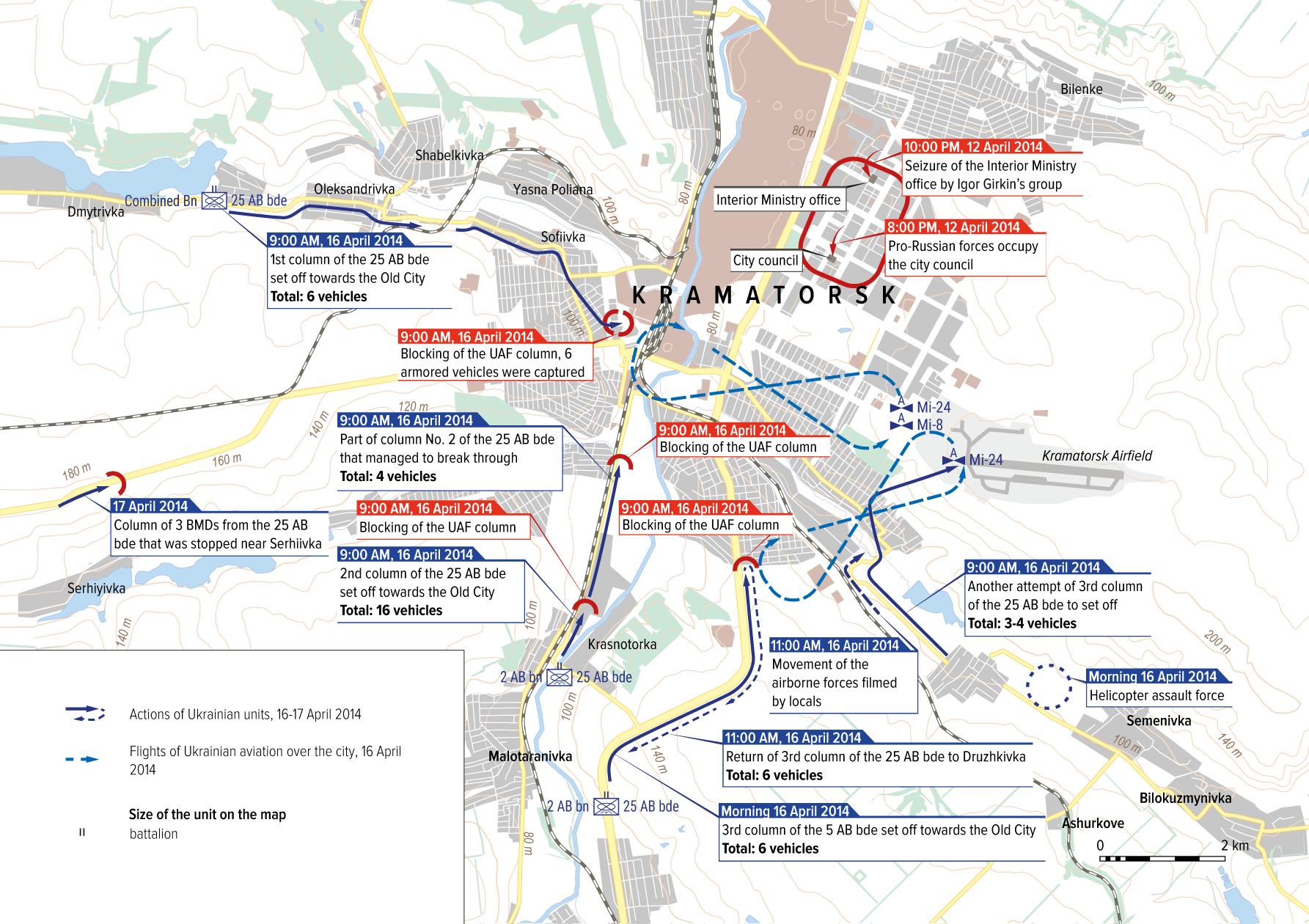
Map of the Battle of Kramatorsk on 12–16 April

As part of this counter-offensive, in the Battle of Kramatorsk, Ukrainian special forces re-took Kramatorsk Airfield on 15 April, after a skirmish with the Donbas People's Militia. Ukrainian officials and Russian media said at least four rebels were killed and several captured. Outside the airfield, angry protesters surrounded Ukrainian unit commander Lt. Gen. Vasyl Krutov and demanded to know why troops had "fired on locals". Krutov said the unrest was being led by Russian forces and "We need to destroy this foreign invader".

On 16 April, Ukraine's 25th Airborne Brigade entered Kramatorsk in columns of BMD-2 infantry fighting vehicles. They were blocked by crowds of civilians "with members of a Russian diversionary-terrorist group among them", according to Ukraine's defense ministry. One of the columns was surrounded and disarmed, and their six armored vehicles were captured by Russian paramilitaries, who drove them to Sloviansk. The same day, a large crowd backed by Russian paramilitaries halted another Ukrainian armored column in Pchyolkino, letting them go only after soldiers surrendered their rifle magazines. Because of this, Turchynov announced he would disband the brigade, although this was later cancelled.

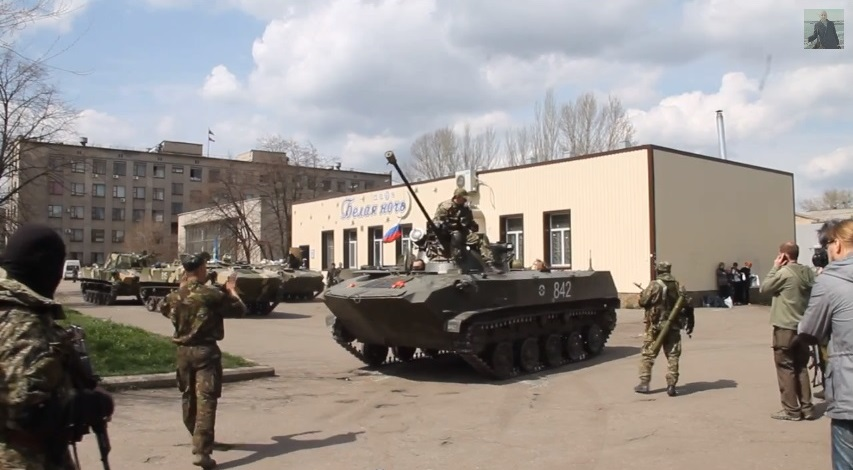
Russian paramilitaries in Sloviansk with a BMD-2 infantry fighting vehicle, 16 April 2014

In Mariupol on 17 April, three members of the Donbas People's Militia were killed, 11 wounded and 63 arrested after a failed assault on a Ukrainian National Guard base.

On 17 April 2014, an agreement was signed in Geneva by representatives of Russia, Ukraine, the EU and the US. It called for a ceasefire in the Donbas, for all illegal armed groups to disarm, and for all illegally occupied buildings and public places to be vacated. The pro-Russian paramilitaries refused to leave occupied buildings and refused to disarm until the Ukrainian nationalist group Right Sector disarmed.

The Ukrainian government announced on 19 April 2014 that it had paused its counter-offensive in the Donbas.

=== Re-launch of Ukrainian operation ===
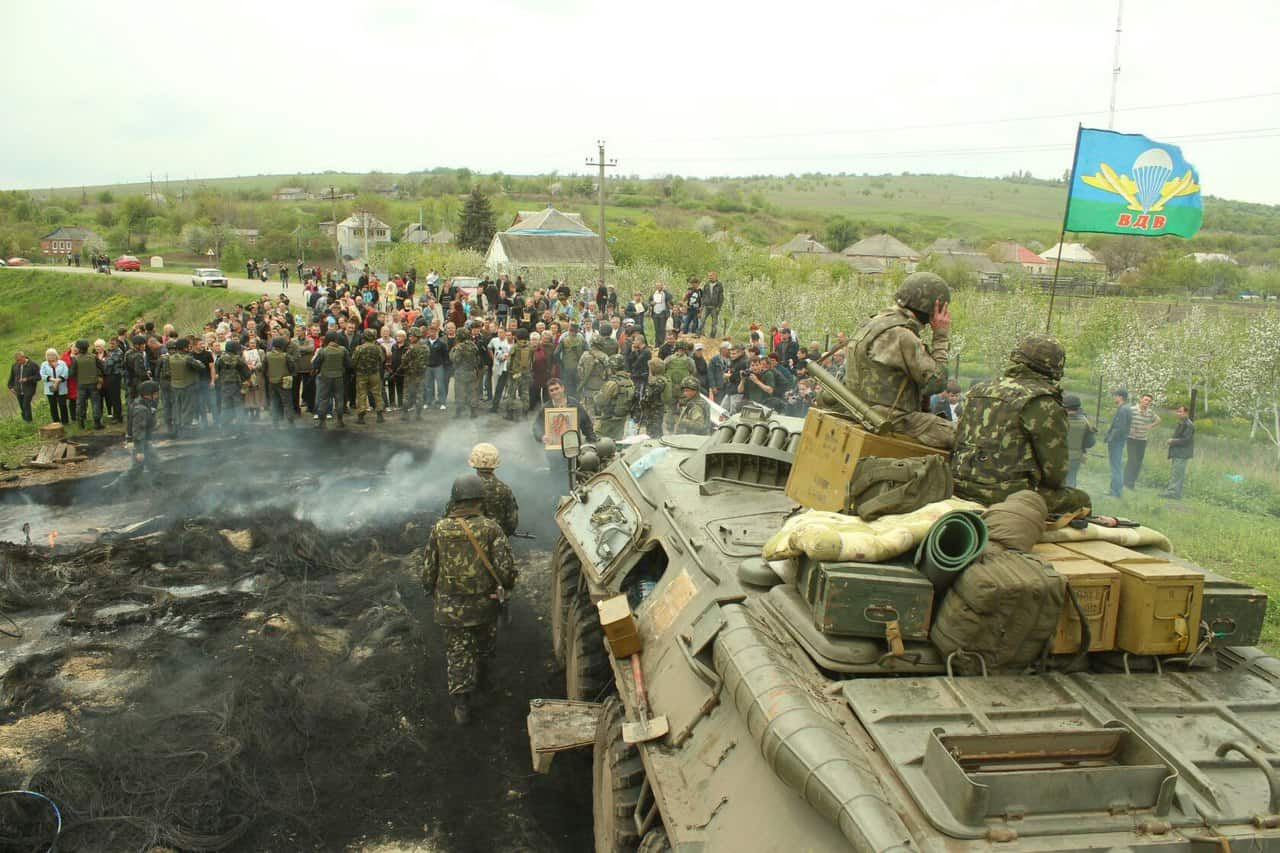
Ukrainian soldiers of the 95th Airborne Brigade outside the village of Andriivka near Sloviansk, 2 May 2014

Ukraine re-launched the stalled operation against pro-Russian paramilitaries on 22 April, after the body of local councillor Volodymyr Rybak was found dumped in a river near Sloviansk. He had been kidnapped on 17 April by pro-Russian militants after he tried to re-raise the Ukrainian flag over Horlivka city council building. The bodies of Maidan activists Yuri Popravko and Yuri Diakovskyi were also found in the river. All three had been kidnapped, tortured, mutilated and killed by pro-Russian militants. They were the first civilians killed by pro-Russian forces in the Donbas war. Turchynov said that "the terrorists who effectively took the whole Donetsk Oblast hostage have now gone too far". Pro-Russian militants kidnapped more than two dozen people, including journalists such as Simon Ostrovsky. On 22 April, the offices of a newspaper in Kostiantynivka were burnt down, after receiving threats for criticizing the militants.

On 21 April, demonstrators gathered for a "people's assembly" outside the SBU building in Luhansk and called for a "people's government", demanding either federalisation or joining Russia. At this assembly, they elected Valery Bolotov as "People's Governor". Two referendums were announced, one to be held on 11 May to determine whether Luhansk region should seek greater autonomy, and another scheduled for 18 May to determine whether the region should join Russia, or declare independence.

The Internal Affairs Ministry reported that the city of Sviatohirsk, near Sloviansk, was retaken by Ukrainian troops on 23 April. In addition, the Defence Ministry said it had taken control over all points of strategic importance in the area around Kramatorsk.

On 24 April 70 to 100 insurgents armed with assault rifles and rocket launchers attacked an armoury in Artemivsk. The depot housed around 30 tanks. Ukrainian troops attempted to fight off the insurgents, but were forced to retreat after many men were wounded by insurgent fire. Some 30 militants seized the police headquarters in Konstantinovka on 28 April.

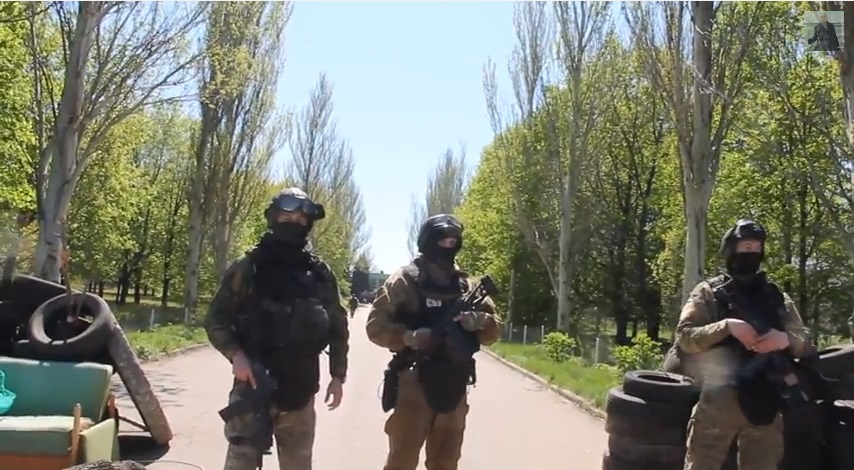
Ukrainian soldiers near Kramatorsk, 25 April 2014

On 24 April, Avakov said that Ukrainian troops had captured the city administration in Mariupol, after a clash with pro-Russian demonstrators there. Despite this, a report by the BBC said that whilst it appeared that Ukrainian troops and the mayor of Mariupol did enter the building in the early morning, Ukrainian troops had abandoned it by the afternoon. Local pro-Russian activists blamed Ukrainian nationalists for the attack upon the building but said that the DPR had regained control. A representative of the Republic, Irina Voropoyeva, said, "We, the Donetsk People's Republic, still control the building. There was an attempted provocation but now it's over."

The same day, Ukrainian government officials said that the Armed Forces had intended to retake the city of Sloviansk, but that an increased threat of "Russian invasion" halted these operations. Russian forces had mobilised within 10 kilometres (6 1/4 mi) of the Ukrainian border. By 6 May 14 Ukrainian troops had died and 66 had been injured in the fighting.

Insurgents took over the offices of the regional state television network on 27 April. After capturing the broadcasting centre, the militants began to broadcast Russian television channels.

The Luhansk People's Republic (LPR) was declared on 27 April. Representatives of the Republic demanded that the Ukrainian government provide amnesty for all protesters, enshrine Russian as an official language, and hold a referendum on the status of the region. They issued an ultimatum that stated that if Kyiv did not meet their demands by 14:00 on 29 April, they would launch an insurgency in tandem with that of the Donetsk People's Republic.

On 29 April, a city administration building in Pervomaisk was overrun by Luhansk People's Republic insurgents, who then raised their flag over it. In Krasnyi Luch, the city administration conceded to demands by separatist activists that it support the referendums on the status of Donetsk and Luhansk of 11 May, and followed by raising the Russian flag over the city administration building.

Insurgents occupied the city administration building in Kadiivka on 1 May. Later in the week, they captured the local police station, business centre, and SBU building. The same day, the police headquarters in Slovianoserbsk was seized by members of the Army of the South-East, affiliated with the Luhansk People's Republic. The town of Antratsyt was occupied by a number of renegade Don Cossacks. Insurgents went on to seize the prosecutor's office in Sievierodonetsk on 7 May. The next day, supporters of the Luhansk People's Republic captured government buildings in Starobilsk.

After a government counter-offensive as part of the "Anti-Terrorist Operation" in Donetsk Oblast on 2–3 May, the insurgents were routed from Kramatorsk's occupied SBU building. Despite this, Ukrainian troops quickly withdrew from the city for unknown reasons, and the separatists quickly regained control. Sporadic fighting continued until 5 July, when the insurgents withdrew from Kramatorsk.

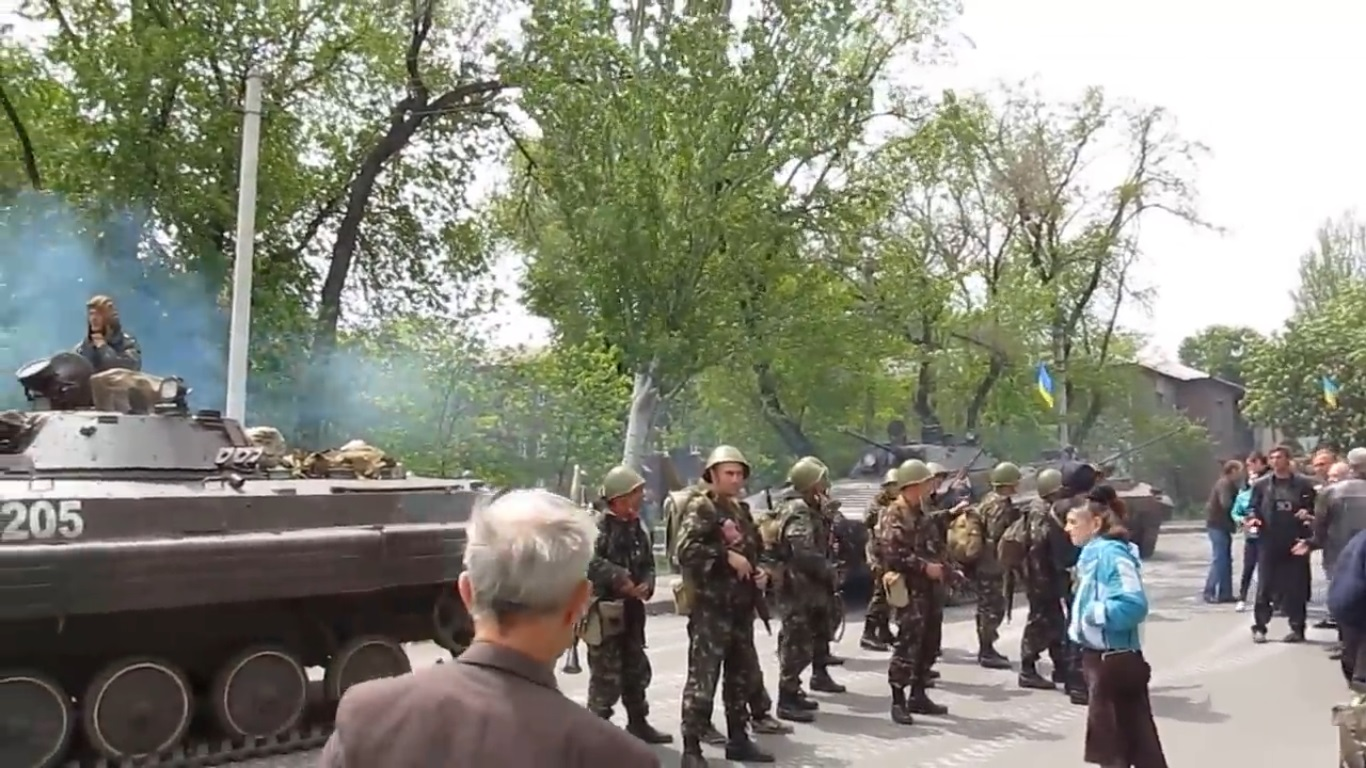
A standoff between pro-Russian activists and Ukrainian forces in Mariupol, 9 May 2014

In Mariupol, the city administration building was briefly retaken by the Ukrainian National Guard on 7 May. The pro-Russian forces quickly took the building back.

Ukrainian troops launched another attack on insurgents in Mariupol on 9 May. A police building occupied by insurgents was set alight by government forces, causing the insurgents to flee. Internal Affairs minister Avakov said that 60 insurgents attacked the police building, not Ukrainian troops and that the police and other government forces repelled the insurgents. Between six and twenty militants were killed, along with one police officer. Four militants were captured, and five policemen were wounded. During the fighting, pro-Russian protesters seized one armoured personnel carrier, and afterwards barricaded the city centre with tyres. The same day, separatists attempting to disarm Ukrainian troops near Donetsk were met with warning shots, and 100 were detained.

A priest from the Ukrainian Orthodox Church (Moscow Patriarchate) attempted to negotiate with separatists near Druzhkivka, but was later killed on 9 May, being shot eight times.

=== May 2014: post-referendum fighting ===
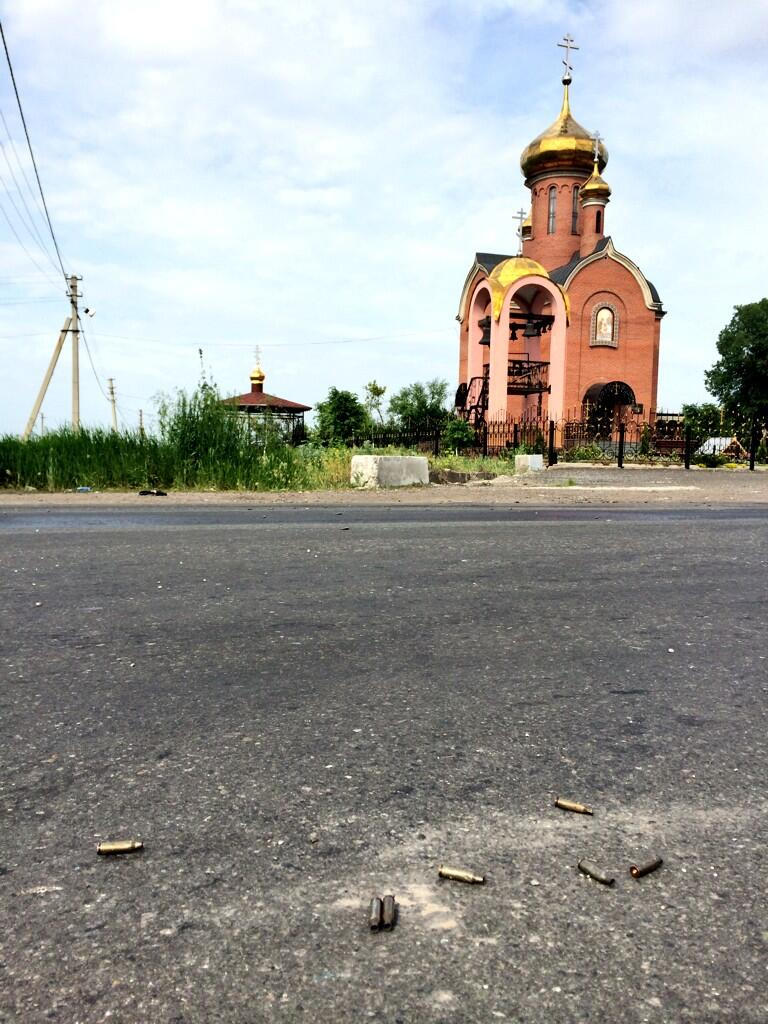
Church of the Holy Epiphany in Karlivka on 23 May, with bullet casings on the asphalt in the foreground.

It was reported on 12 May that, following the local autonomy referendum, the Donbas People's Militia leader Igor Girkin declared himself "Supreme Commander" of the Donetsk People's Republic. In his decree, he demanded that all military stationed in the region swear an oath of allegiance to him within 48 hours, and said that all remaining Ukrainian military in the region would be "destroyed on the spot". He then petitioned the Russian Federation for military support to protect against "the threat of intervention by NATO" and "genocide". Pavel Gubarev, president of Donetsk People's Republic, instituted martial law on 15 May, and vowed for "total annihilation" of Ukrainian forces if they did not pull out of the Donbas by 21:00. Similarly, the president of the Luhansk People's Republic, Valery Bolotov, declared martial law on 22 May.

The Donetsk-based steel magnate Rinat Akhmetov called on his 300,000 employees within the Donetsk region to "rally against separatists" on 20 May. Sirens sounded at noon at his factories to signal the beginning of the rally. A so-called "Peace March" was held in the Donbas Arena in Donetsk city, accompanied by cars sounding their horns at noon. BBC News and Ukrainska Pravda reported that some vehicles were attacked by separatists, and that gunmen had warned the offices of several city taxi services not to take part. On 16 May, Metinvest steelworkers, along with local police and security forces, routed the insurgents from the city administration and other occupied government buildings in the city. Most insurgents left the city, but some could still be seen outside the burnt city administration building.

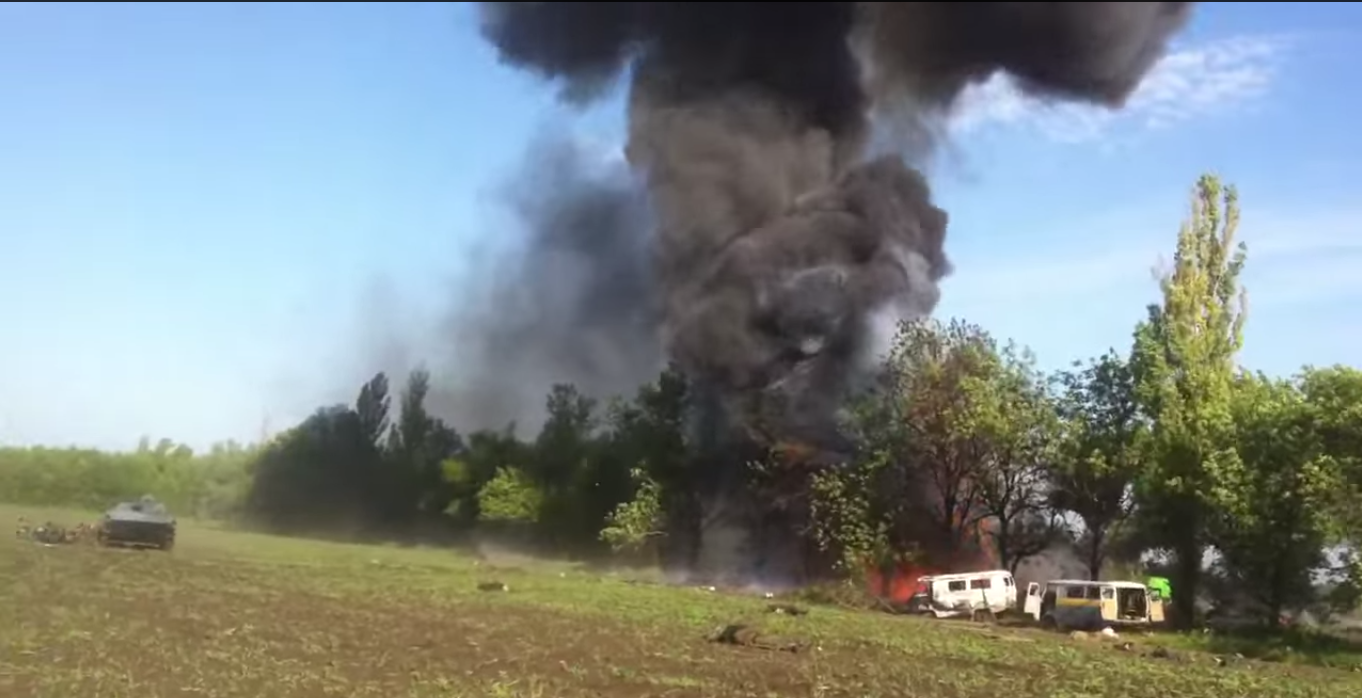
Attack on Volnovakha checkpoint, 22 May 2014

On 22 May 18 Ukrainian soldiers were killed during an insurgent attack upon an army checkpoint near the city of Volnovakha. Three armoured personnel carriers and several lorries were destroyed in the attack, whilst one insurgent was killed. The same day, a convoy consisting of 100 soldiers attempted to cross a bridge at Rubizhne, Luhansk Oblast, and advance into insurgent-held territory. They were ambushed by a group of between 300 and 500 insurgents. After fighting that lasted throughout the day, the soldiers were forced to retreat. Between two and fourteen soldiers and between seven and twenty insurgents were killed during the fighting. Three army infantry combat vehicles and one lorry were destroyed, and another three armoured vehicles were captured by the insurgents. The Internal Affairs Ministry stated that some insurgents had attempted to enter Luhansk Oblast from Russia, but had been repelled by border guards.

Following a declaration by Pavel Gubarev establishing the "New Russia Party" on 22 May, representatives of the Donetsk and Luhansk republics signed an agreement creating the confederative state of New Russia. Separatists planned to incorporate most of Ukraine's southern and eastern regions into the new confederation, including the key cities of Kharkiv, Kherson, Dnipropetrovsk, Mykolaiv, Zaporizhzhia and Odesa. The declaration signed established the position of Russian Orthodoxy as the state religion and an intention to nationalise key industries.

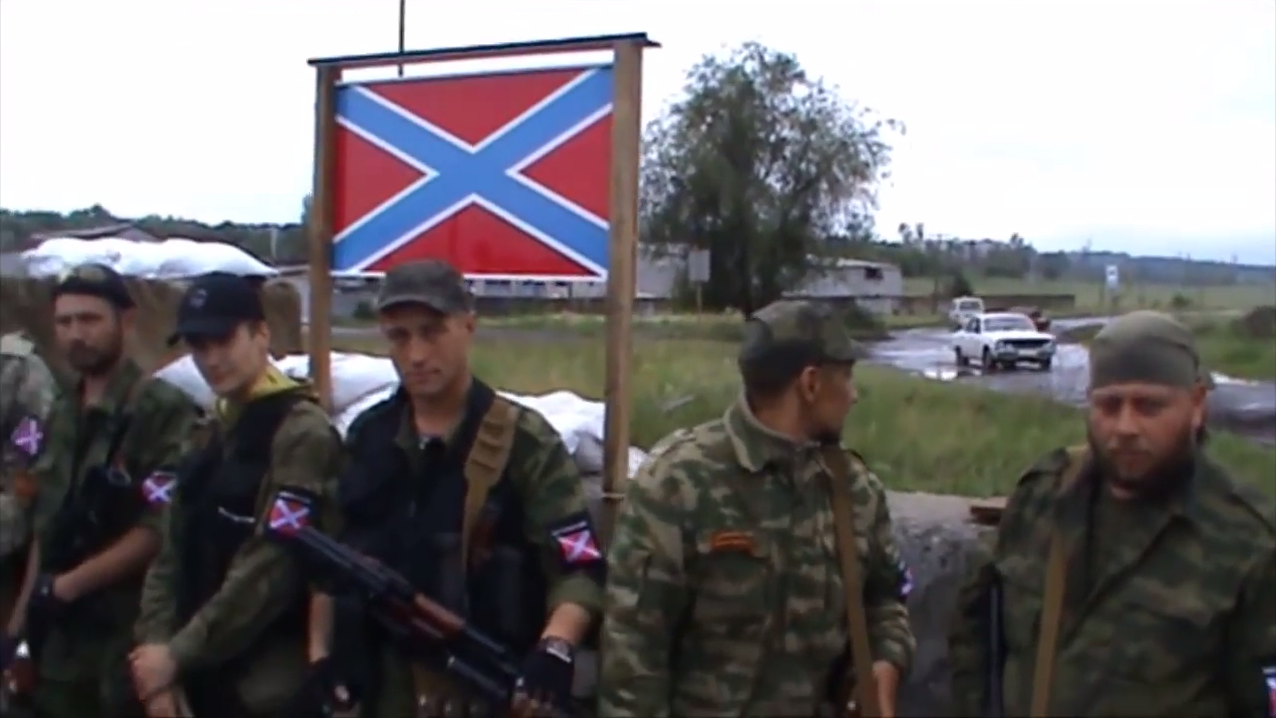
Separatists of the "1st Slavyansk Battalion" in Semenivka with the flag of "New Russia" (Novorossiya) in June 2014

A unit of the pro-government Donbas Battalion volunteer paramilitary attempted to advance on a separatist checkpoint near the village of Karlivka, northwest of Donetsk city, on 23 May. They were ambushed by a group of between 150 and 200 separatists, supported by one of the captured armoured personnel carriers. The pro-government paramilitary was surrounded by the separatists, and outnumbered six to one until fighters affiliated with the nationalist Right Sector broke through the separatist lines to allow some members of the group to escape.

Five members of the Donbas Battalion were killed, along with four separatists. Twenty members of the pro-government paramilitaries were wounded, and at least four were captured. The involvement of Right Sector was disputed by the leadership of the Donbas Battalion. Pro-Russian leader Igor Bezler said that he executed all of the captured paramilitaries. Another separatist leader confirmed four of their fighters were killed, and also said that ten pro-government paramilitaries and two civilians died. During the same day, two pro-Russian separatists were killed during an assault by the pro-government "Ukraine Battalion" paramilitary on an occupied local government building in Torez.

=== Escalation in May and June 2014 ===
==== First Battle of Donetsk Airport ====
On the morning of 26 May 200 pro-Russian insurgents, including members of the Vostok Battalion, captured the main terminal of the Donetsk International Airport, erected roadblocks around it, and demanded that government forces withdraw. The Ukrainian National Guard issued an ultimatum to the separatists, asking them to surrender. This was rejected. Government forces then launched an assault on separatist positions at the airport with paratroopers and airstrikes. Attack helicopters were used by government forces. They targeted a separatist-operated anti-aircraft gun. An estimated 40 insurgents died in the fighting, with some civilians caught in the crossfire. Between 15 and 35 insurgents were killed in a single friendly-fire incident, when two lorries carrying wounded fighters away from the airport were ambushed by insurgents mistaking them for Ukrainian forces.

During the fighting at the airport, Druzhba Arena in Donetsk city was ransacked by pro-Russian insurgents, who looted the building and destroyed surveillance equipment, and set it ablaze. Concurrently, Donetsk police said the insurgents had killed two policemen in the nearby town of Horlivka. The Moscow Times reported that the two men had been executed for "breaking their oath to the Donetsk People's Republic".

Mykhailo Koval, the Minister of Defence, said on 30 May that Ukrainian government forces had "completely cleared" the insurgents from the southern and western parts of Donetsk Oblast and the northern part of Luhansk Oblast. Meanwhile, an internal coup replaced the leadership of the Donetsk People's Republic, and some bodies of Russian fighters killed in the airport battle were repatriated to Russia.

==== Luhansk border post siege ====
Two separatists were killed in a skirmish with Ukrainian border guards on 31 May. Two days later, five separatists were killed when 500 separatists attacked a border post in Luhansk Oblast. Eleven border guards and eight separatists were wounded during the fighting, which also killed one civilian.

==== 2 June Luhansk airstrike ====
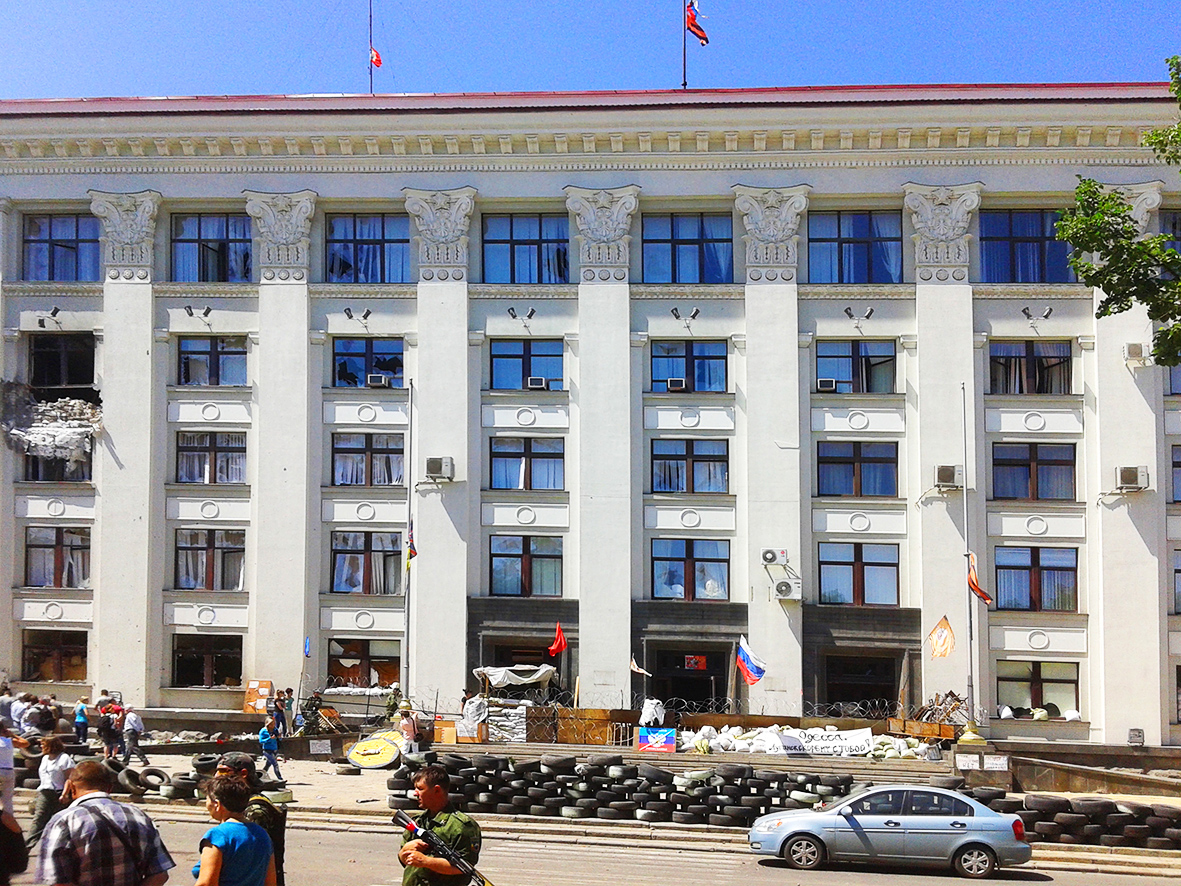
Damage to the Luhansk RSA building on 2 June 2014

On 2 June, eight people were killed and more than 20 wounded by a series of explosions hitting the occupied RSA building in Luhansk city. Separatists blamed the incident on a government airstrike, while Ukrainian officials denied this, and claimed that the explosions were caused by a stray surface-to-air missile fired by insurgents. The Organisation for Security and Co-operation in Europe (OSCE) published a report the next day, stating that based on "limited observation", they believed that the explosion was caused by an airstrike, supporting separatist claims.

A CNN investigation found clear evidence that the attack came from the air and the pattern of the craters suggested use of standard equipment on the Su-25, a ground-attack fighter, and the Su-27 – both combat aircraft operated by Ukraine. Although the Russian Federation also uses Sukhoi Su-27, it was not mentioned in the CNN news article as even a possibility. Radio Liberty also concluded that "Despite Denials, All Evidence For Deadly Explosion Points To Kyiv". CNN said that it was the first time that civilians had been killed in an attack by the Ukrainian air force during the 2014 pro-Russian unrest in the Donbas. The next day, Luhansk People's Republic declared a three-day mourning in the city.

==== Continued fighting ====
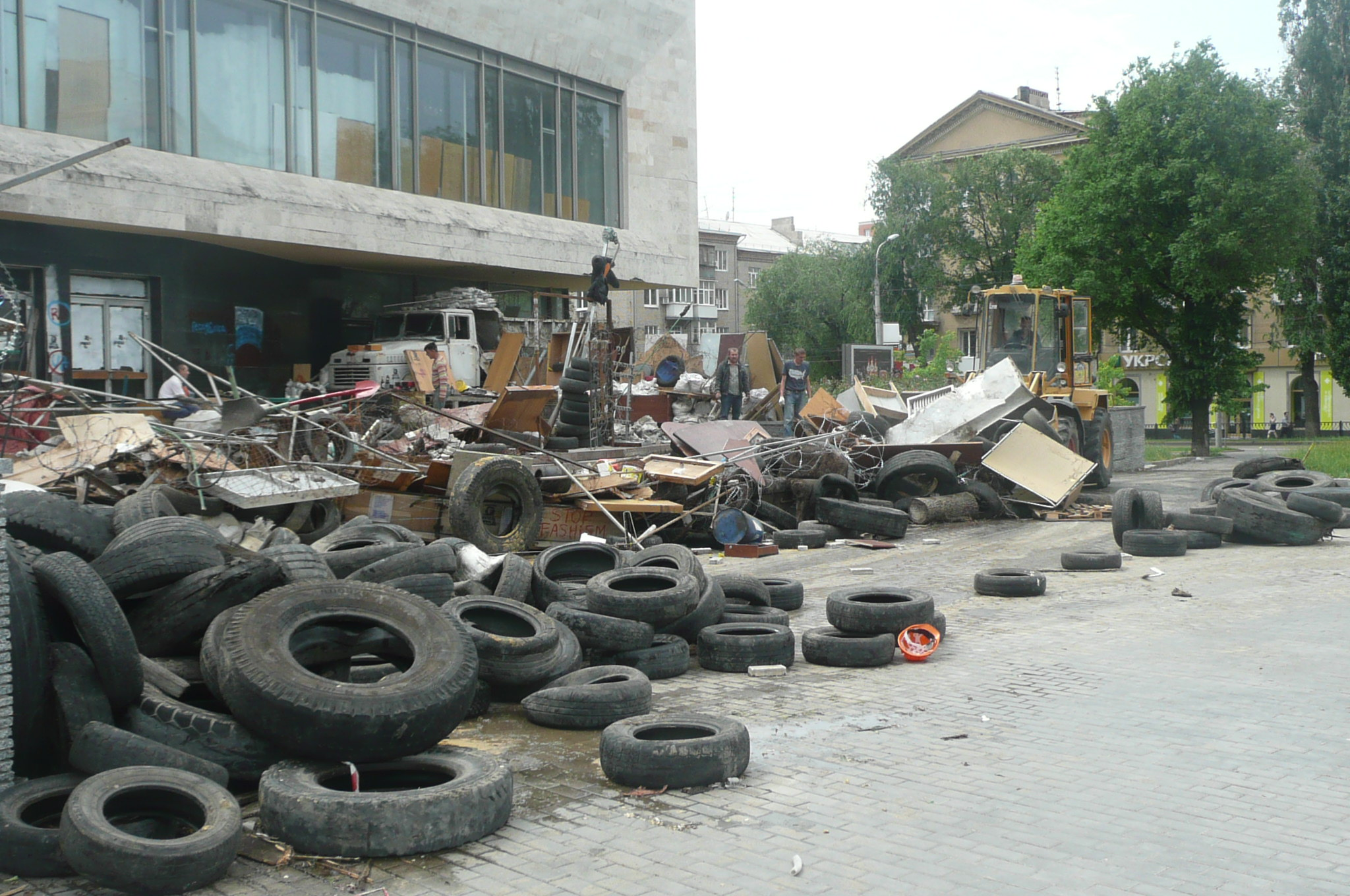
Vostok Battalion members dismantling the barricade at Donetsk RSA on 3 June 2014

Government forces destroyed a separatist stronghold in Semenivka, and regained control of Krasnyi Lyman on 3 June. Two soldiers were killed in the fighting, and forty-five were wounded, with conflicting reports about losses on the insurgent side. Per government sources, 300 insurgents were killed and 500 wounded, but insurgents said they lost between 10 and 50.

The next day, insurgents captured the besieged Luhansk border post (seizing vast quantities of munitions) and a National Guard base near Luhansk city. The fighting in these areas left six insurgents dead, and three government soldiers wounded. Another border post was captured by the insurgents in Sverdlovsk. The National Guard base fell after guardsmen ran out of ammunition.

Another border post was attacked on 5 June, in the village of Marynivka. Government officials said that between 15 and 16 insurgents were killed and that five soldiers were injured as well. A shootout between rival separatist groups in Donetsk city took place on 7 June, near the Donetsk RSA. The vice-president of the Donetsk People's Republic, Maxim Petrukhin, was killed in the fighting, and president Denis Pushilin was wounded.

==== Russian tank incursion ====
Ukrainian officials said that Russia had allowed tanks to cross the Russo-Ukrainian border into Donetsk Oblast on 11 June. Internal Affairs Minister Arsen Avakov said "we have observed columns passing with armoured personnel carriers, other armoured vehicles and artillery pieces, and tanks which, according to our information, came across the border and this morning were in Snizhne". He said Ukrainian forces had destroyed part of the column, and that fighting was still under way. Reuters correspondents confirmed the presence of three tanks in Donetsk city, and the US State Department's Bureau of Intelligence and Research also said that Russia had sent tanks, along with other heavy weapons, to the separatists in Ukraine.

The weapons sent are said to have included: a column of three T-64 tanks, several BM-21 Grad multiple rocket launchers, and other military vehicles. "Russia will claim these tanks were taken from Ukrainian forces, but no Ukrainian tank units have been operating in that area", the US State Department said "We are confident that these tanks came from Russia". The newly elected Ukrainian president Petro Poroshenko said that it was "unacceptable" for tanks to cross into Ukraine. Russia called the reports "fake". Nevertheless, the three tanks were later spotted moving through Makiivka and Torez, flying the flag of Russia. Insurgents confirmed that they had obtained three tanks, but leaders refused to elaborate on how they acquired them; one militant told reporters that they came "from a military warehouse".

The president of the DPR, Denis Pushilin, said the three tanks would be stationed in Donetsk city and that they gave his forces "at least some hope of defending [Donetsk] because heavy weapons are already being used against us". Konstantin Mashovets, a former Ukrainian Defence Ministry official, said the tanks had likely been seized by Russian forces in Crimea before making their way into mainland Ukraine. Anton Heraschenko, an advisor to Arsen Avakov, confirmed at a briefing in Kyiv that the tanks were once in the possession of the Armed Forces of Ukraine in Crimea, and had been transferred by sea to Russia before crossing the border into Ukraine.

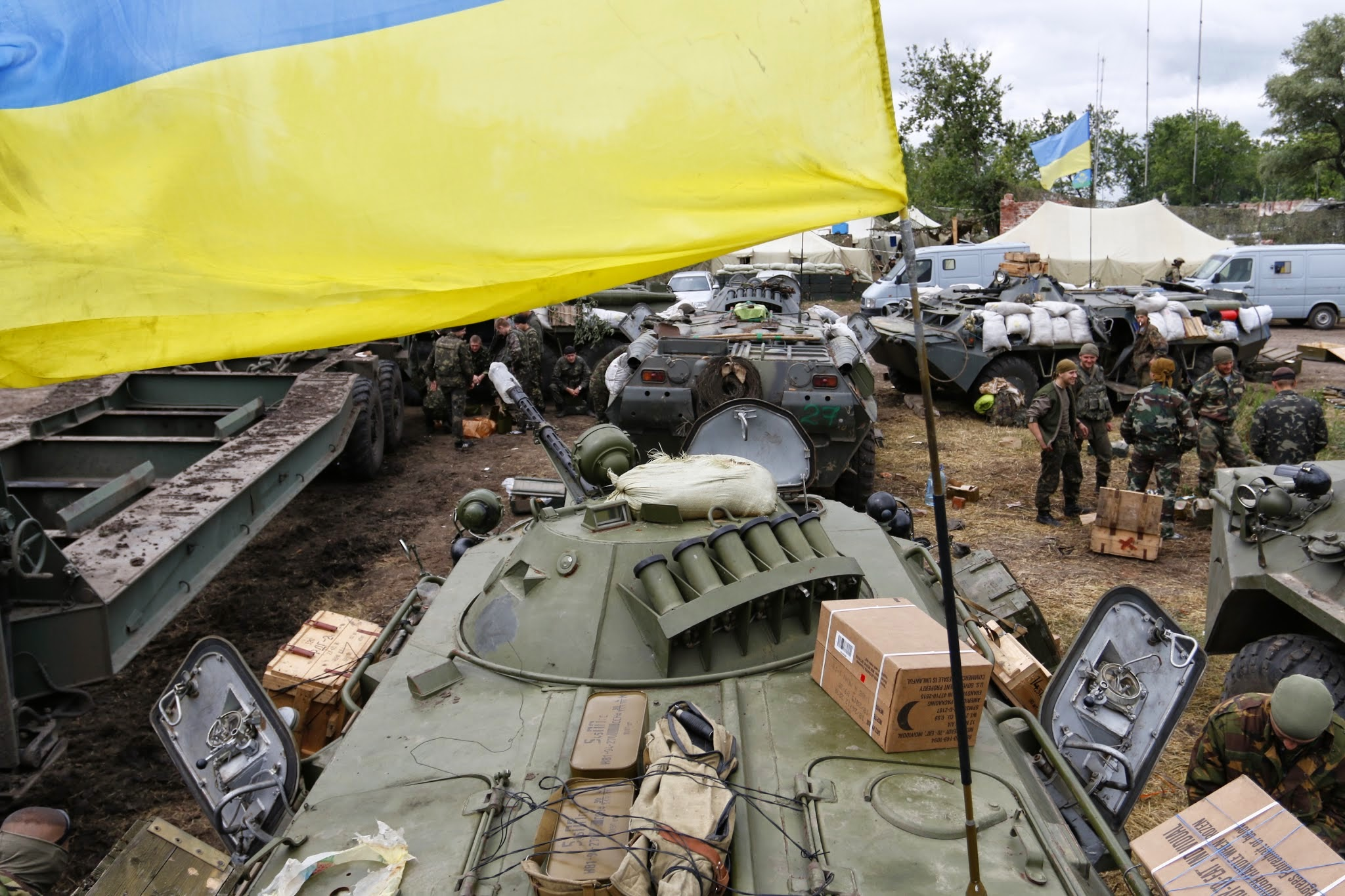
A BTR-80 in Ukrainian service, 12 June 2014

An agreement on 12 June between the Minister of Internal Affairs, Arsen Avakov, and the president of the DPR, Denis Pushilin, meant to create a ceasefire and allow civilians to escape the violence in Sloviansk, failed with both sides blaming each other. The next morning, a convoy of border guardsmen was attacked by insurgents while passing Mariupol, leaving at least five of the guardsmen dead.

On 13 June, Ukrainian troops and the National Guard retook the city of Mariupol, and declared it the "provisional capital" of Donetsk Oblast until the government regains control over Donetsk city. >

==== Ilyushin Il-76 shoot-down ====
A Ukrainian Air Force Ilyushin Il-76MD was shot down by forces aligned with the Luhansk People's Republic on 14 June. The aircraft was preparing to land at Luhansk International Airport, and was carrying troops and equipment from an undisclosed location. All 49 people on board died.

==== Battle of Yampil ====
Late on 19 June, a battle fought with tanks and armoured vehicles broke out in the town of Yampil, near government-held Krasnyi Lyman. Up to 4,000 insurgents took part. Ukrainian troops tried to retake Yampil with the goal of breaking through to Siversk. According to the Armed Forces, it started after insurgents attempted to break through a cordon of government troops around government-held Krasny Lyman. The battle was described as exceeding "in terms of force and scale anything there has been" during the conflict in the Donbas.

The Ukrainian military deployed both air and artillery strikes in their attempts to rout the insurgents. The battle continued into the next day. Overnight, between 7 and 12 soldiers were killed and between 25 and 30 were wounded. The Armed Forces said they killed 300 insurgents, but this was not independently verified, the separatists confirmed only two deaths and seven wounded on their side. The insurgents also said they destroyed one tank, several BMD-1s, and also shot down a Su-25 bomber.

The Ukrainian military said that they had gained control of Yampil and Siversk on 20 June. A unilateral ceasefire by Ukrainian forces, as part of Ukrainian president Petro Poroshenko's 15-point peace plan, was due to begin the next day. By this point, the number of soldiers killed in the battle had reached 13. During the continued fighting, militants blew up a bridge over a river in the village of Zakitne.

=== July 2014: post-ceasefire government offensive ===
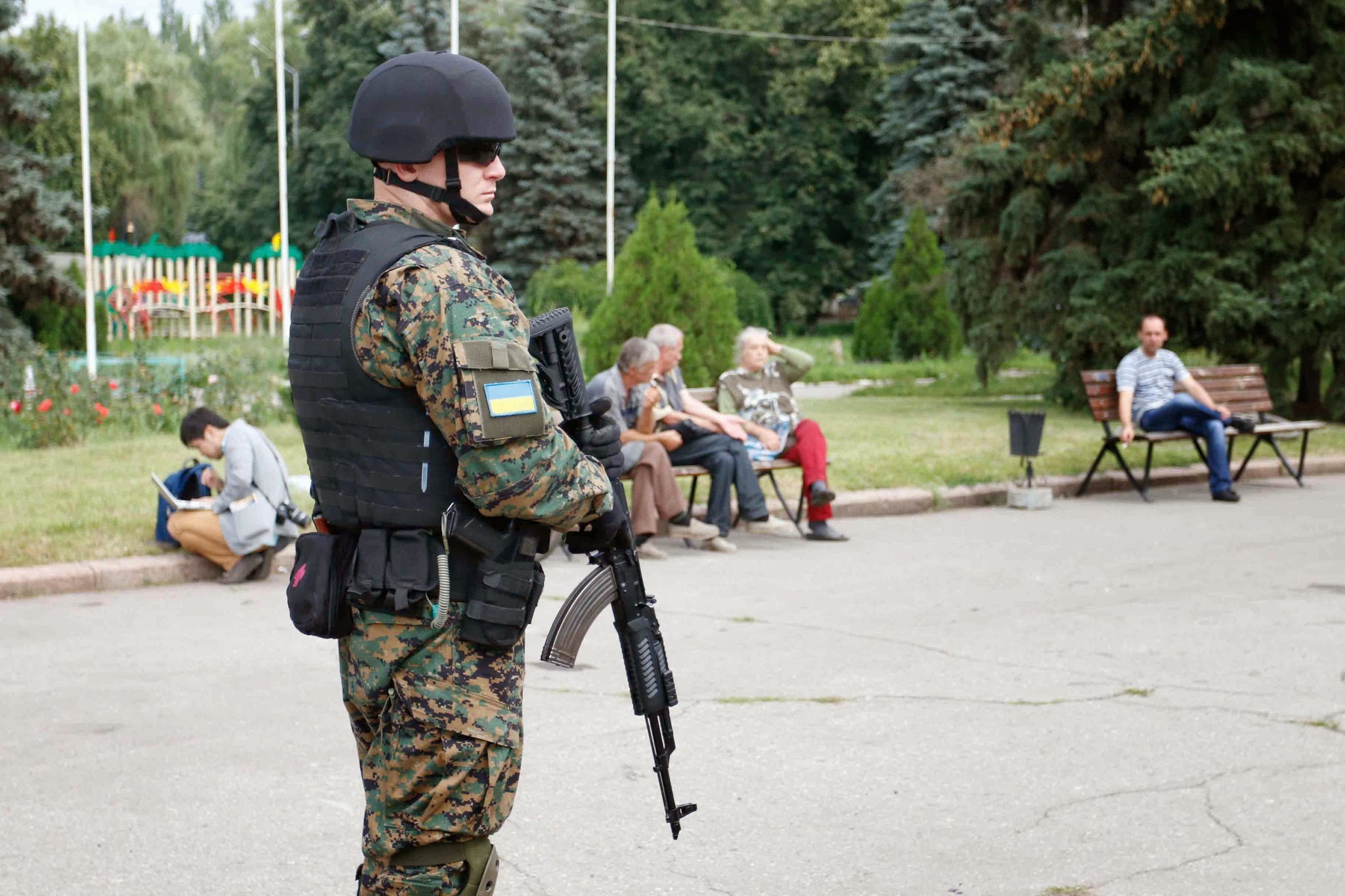
Ukrainian soldier in Sloviansk, July 2014

After a week-long ceasefire unilaterally declared by Ukrainian president Petro Poroshenko ended, the Armed Forces renewed their operations against the insurgents on 1 July. Shelling occurred in Kramatorsk and Sloviansk, and government forces retook a border crossing in Dolzhansk, one of the three major border crossings occupied by the separatists. Government forces also recaptured the villages of Brusivka and Stary Karavan. The same day, insurgents in Luhansk said that they had taken control of Luhansk International Airport. On 1 July 2014 in Donetsk a street gunfight broke between rival factions of pro-Russian militants, which resulted in one person being fatally wounded and two others in critical conditions.

Internal Affairs Ministry spokesman Zoryan Shkyriakuk said that over 1,000 pro-Russian insurgents were killed in the first day following the resumption of hostilities. Liga.net, citing a source involved with the government military operation, reported that over 400 insurgents were killed in action, but that the higher figures reported earlier could not be confirmed. Separatists themselves reported only two deaths in fighting at Mykolaivka.

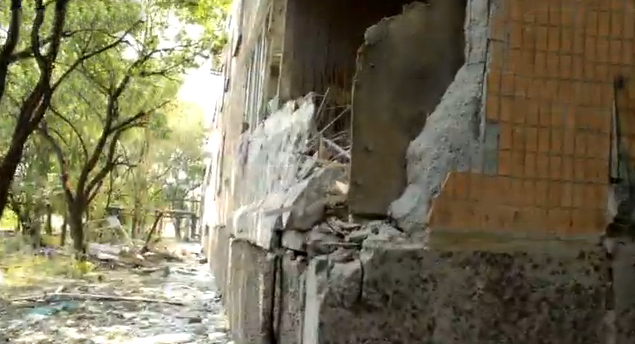
A damaged block of flats in Donetsk, 14 July 2014

Insurgents attacked a border post in Novoazovsk on 2 July. During the attack, mortars were fired upon the post, and clashes broke out. One border guard was killed in the fighting, and another eight guardsmen were injured. Government forces recaptured the town of Mykolaivka, near Sloviansk, on 4 July. A group of DPR-affiliated militants defected as a result, and joined the Ukrainian army.

In a further blow to the insurgents, government forces retook the stronghold of Sloviansk on 5 July. Commander of the DPR insurgents, Igor Girkin, took the decision "due to the overwhelming numerical superiority of the enemy", according to DPR prime minister Alexander Borodai. He said that DPR forces had retreated to Kramatorsk, but BBC News reported that they were seen abandoning their checkpoints in Kramatorsk. Later that day, Borodai confirmed that the insurgents had abandoned "the entire northern sector", including Kramatorsk, and had retreated to Donetsk city. After the retreat of Girkin's forces to Donetsk, he assumed control of the DPR, replacing the previous authorities there in what was described as a "coup d'état".

Subsequently, Ukraine's Armed Forces recaptured Druzhkivka, Kostyantynivka, and Artemivsk. Amidst the insurgent retreat, Donetsk city mayor Oleksandr Lukyanchenko said that at least 30,000 people had left the city since April.

Ahead of a planned government offensive on the insurgent-occupied city of Donetsk, key roads leading into the city were blocked on 7 July. Insurgents destroyed railway bridges over the roads, causing them to collapse and block the roads. Ukraine's Defence Minister Valeriy Heletey stated on 8 July that there would be "no more unilateral ceasefires", and said dialogue was only possible if the insurgents laid down their weapons. More fighting broke out at Luhansk International Airport on 9 July. LPR-affiliated insurgents said that they had captured the airport on 1 July, but the Ukrainian army managed to maintain control over it. More than 10,000 households in Luhansk Oblast were without gas service due to damage to gas lines.

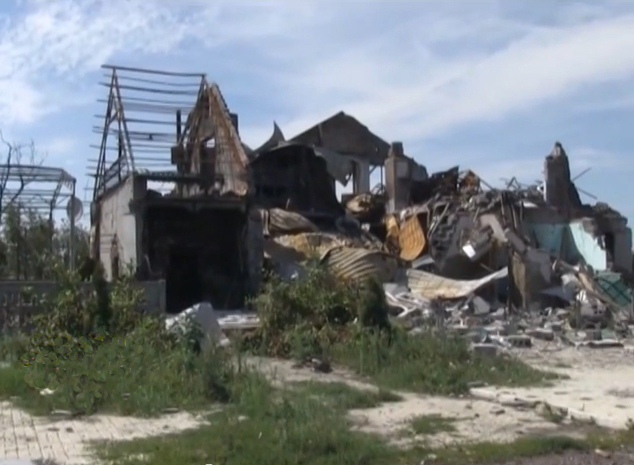
A destroyed house in the Donbas, July 2014

Clashes at the Donetsk International Airport continued on 10 July. Insurgents fired mortars at the airport, and attempted to recapture it, but were repelled by Ukrainian troops. Ukrainian forces also retook the city of Siversk. The same day, the Luhansk city administration reported that six civilians had been injured due to ongoing hostilities across the city. There were also reports of factionalism among the separatists, with some desertions. According to these reports, the Vostok Battalion had rejected the authority of Igor Girkin. Alexander Borodai, prime minister of the DPR, denied these reports.

Heavy fighting continued in Luhansk Oblast on 11 July. On that day, a Ukrainian column travelling near Rovenky was attacked by an insurgent-operated Grad rocket lorry. A Ukrainian airstrike destroyed the rocket launcher, but only after 23 soldiers were killed. In response to the attack, Ukrainian president Poroshenko said that "For every life of our soldiers, the militants will pay with tens and hundreds of their own". The next day, the Ukrainian Air Force launched airstrikes on insurgent positions across Donetsk and Luhansk oblasts. The Ukrainian government said that 500 insurgents were killed in these strikes, which they said were retaliations for the separatist rocket attack the previous day. Four people were killed at Marinka, a western suburb of Donetsk city, after rockets struck an insurgent-held area. The Ukrainian government and separatists blamed each other for the attack.

=== Fighting worsens in eastern Donetsk Oblast ===
After a brief lull following the insurgent withdrawal from the northern part of Donetsk Oblast, fighting continued to escalate sharply in the eastern parts of Donetsk Oblast. Shells landed on the border town of Donetsk in Rostov Oblast, a part of Russia, on 13 July. One civilian was killed in the shelling. Russian officials blamed the Armed Forces of Ukraine, whilst Ukraine denied responsibility and accused insurgents in the Donbas of having staged a false flag attack. Russia said it was considering launching airstrikes against Ukrainian government targets as retaliation.

Ukrainian forces ended an insurgent blockade of Luhansk International Airport on 14 July. LPR officials acknowledged that they lost 30 men during fighting in the village of Oleksandrivka. The insurgent-occupied town of Snizhne was hit by rockets fired from an aeroplane on 15 July, leaving at least 11 people dead, and destroying multiple homes. The insurgents blamed the Air Force of Ukraine, but the Ukrainian government denied any involvement.

Clashes broke out between Ukrainian and pro-Russian forces along the border with Russia in Shakhtarsk Raion on 16 July. Insurgents who had been holed up in the town of Stepanivka made an attempt to escape encirclement by government forces at 05:00. According to a report by the National Guard, a roadblock near the border village of Marynivka was attacked by the insurgents with tanks, mortar fire, and anti-tank missiles. The checkpoint was shelled for over an hour, causing significant damage to infrastructure in Marynivka. Guardsmen repelled the attack, and forced the insurgents back to Stepanivka, where fighting continued. The battle then moved to the nearby village of Tarany. At least 11 Ukrainian soldiers died in the fighting. Attempts to form a "contact group" between the insurgents and the Ukrainian government, part of President Poroshenko's "15-point peace plan", failed, leaving little hope of a renewed ceasefire. The insurgents later said that they retook Marynivka.

=== Downing of Malaysia Airlines Flight 17 ===
On 17 July 2014, DPR forces shot down a civilian passenger jet, Malaysia Airlines Flight 17 over Hrabove (a village in the Donetsk Oblask), killing all 298 people on board. This disaster followed two similar incidents earlier in the week, when two Ukrainian Air Force planes were shot down.

DPR-affiliated insurgents blamed the Ukrainian government for the disaster, whereas the government, Netherlands, and Australia blamed Russia and the insurgents. The responsibility for investigation was delegated to the Dutch Safety Board (DSB) and the Dutch-led joint investigation team (JIT), who concluded that the airliner was downed by a Buk surface-to-air missile launched from pro-Russian separatist-controlled territory in Ukraine. According to the JIT, the Buk that was used originated from the 53rd Anti-Aircraft Missile Brigade of the Russian Federation, and had been transported from Russia on the day of the crash, fired from a field in a separatist-controlled area, and the launcher returned to Russia after it was used to shoot down MH17.

On the basis of the JIT's conclusions, the governments of the Netherlands and Australia held Russia responsible for the deployment of the Buk installation and took steps to hold Russia formally accountable.

=== Government push into Donetsk and Luhansk cities ===
On 18 July, at least 20 civilians were killed by shelling of Luhansk city, according to a statement by the separatist-controlled city administration. It said that a barrage of rockets hit "virtually every district". The shelling forced OSCE monitors to flee from their office in Luhansk, and move to Starobilsk. Shelling damaged an electrical substation in the city's Kamennobrodskiy district, causing blackouts. An oil refinery in Lysychansk was also set alight. Ukrainian forces went on to capture the south-eastern section of Luhansk city. Another 16 people were killed overnight, and at least 60 were wounded. According to a government report, Luhansk airport was secured by Ukrainian forces amidst the battle.

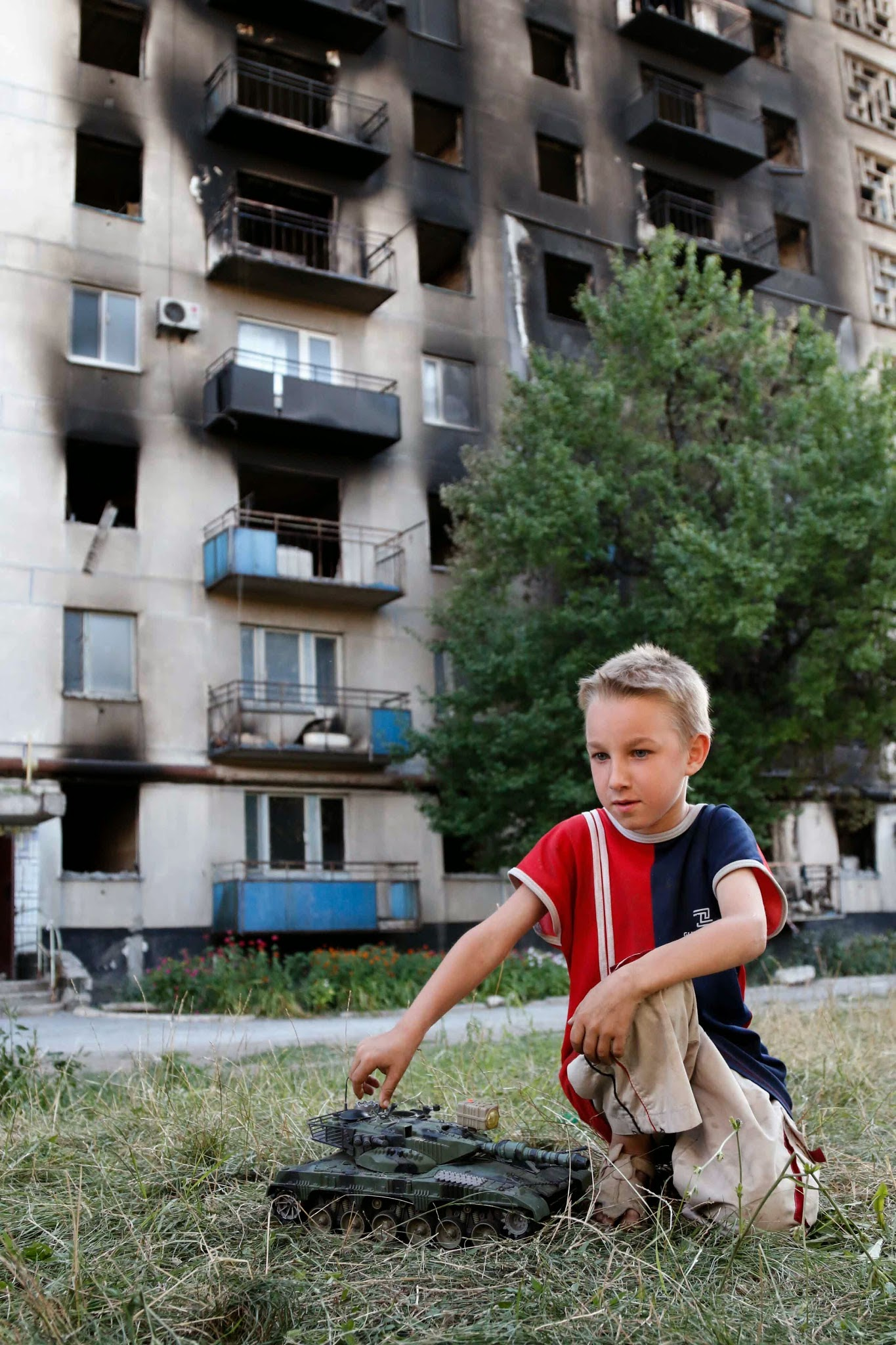
A boy plays in front of a burnt out tower block in Lysychansk, 28 July 2014

Heavy fighting also resumed around Donetsk airport on 18 July, and explosions were heard in all districts of the city. By 21 July, heavy fighting in Donetsk resumed; the city was rocked by explosions and artillery fire. Fighting was concentrated in the northwestern districts of Kyivskyi and Kuibyshevskyi, and also near the central railway station and airport, leading local residents to seek refuge in bomb shelters, or to flee the city. The city's water supply was cut off during the fighting, and all railway and bus service was stopped. The streets emptied, and insurgents erected barricades across the city to control traffic.

The cities of Dzerzhynsk, Soledar, and Rubizhne were retaken by Ukrainian forces on 21 July. The suburb of Mayorsk, just outside Horlivka, and the city of Sievierodonetsk, in Luhansk Oblast, were recaptured by Ukraine on 22 July. The Ukrainian paramilitary Donbas Battalion captured Popasna. OSCE monitors visiting Donetsk following the previous day's fighting there said that the city was "practically deserted", and that the fighting had stopped. The same day, DPR prime minister Alexander Borodai said that he wanted to resume ceasefire talks. DPR commander Igor Girkin also said "The time has come when Russia must take a final decision – to really support Donbas's Russians or abandon them forever". Also,

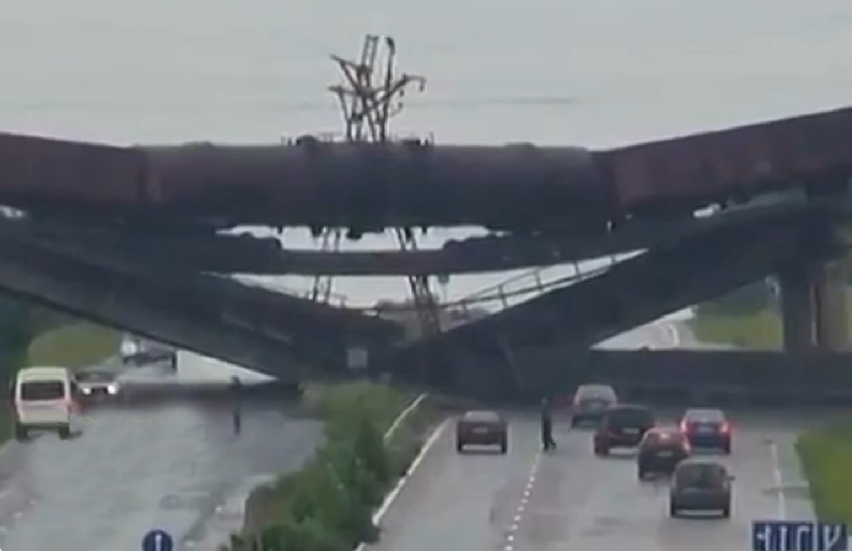
A destroyed railway flyover, over the H20 highway, 25 July 2014

After having retaken Sievierodonetsk, government forces fought insurgents around the neighbouring city of Lysychansk. An insurgent car bomb killed three soldiers during the fighting there. Grad rocket attacks were launched against government forces garrisoned at Vesela Hora, Kamysheve, and also Luhansk airport. The press centre for the government military operation said that situation remained "most complex" in the areas around "Donetsk city, Luhansk city, Krasnodon and Popasna".

Ukrainian forces broke through the insurgent blockade around Donetsk airport on 23 July and then advanced into the northwestern corner of Donetsk city. The insurgents withdrew from many areas on the outskirts of the city. Insurgent commander Igor Girkin said that this was done to fortify Donetsk city centre, and also to avoid being encircled by government forces. He also said that he did not expect a government incursion into Donetsk city centre. Meanwhile, clashes continued in Shakhtarsk Raion, along the border with Russia. Amidst the fighting, two Ukrainian Su-25 fighter jets that had been providing air support to ground forces near Dmytrivka were shot down by the insurgents.

On 24 July government forces recaptured Lysychansk. The same day, fighting raged around Horlivka. Government forces launched air and artillery strikes on insurgents within the city, and clashes were fought all around it. One important bridge collapsed in the fighting, severing a critical route out of the city. People fled the violence in cars and on foot. Despite these advances by Ukrainian forces, the border with Russia was not secured. Izvaryne border post in Luhansk Oblast, which is controlled by the Army of the South-East, was reported to be the main entry point for weapons and reinforcements from Russia. Shelling began again in the Kyivskyi, Kirovskyi and Petrovskyi districts of Donetsk city. According to Donetsk city administration, 11 houses were damaged in Petrovsky, and at least one man was injured. The fighting continued overnight into 26 July, with explosions, shelling, and shooting heard across the city.

During the third day of the government's offensive on the insurgent-stronghold of Horlivka, between 20 and 30 civilians were killed on 27 July. Horlivka was virtually abandoned, with electric power and water cut off. Shelling damaged or destroyed many buildings, including a hospital, greengrocer's, and energy company office. By 29 July, a further 17 civilians had been killed in the fighting in Horlivka, along with an additional 43 people injured.

On 27 July, Ukrainian troops entered the town of Shakhtarsk, fought the insurgents that had been occupying it, and captured it. This cut off the supply corridor between the territories held by the DPR and LPR, isolating insurgents in Donetsk city. Skirmishes also broke out in the nearby towns of Snizhne and Torez. The intense combat across Shakhtarsk Raion forced a party of Dutch and Australian policemen to call off an attempt to investigate the crash site of Malaysia Airlines Flight 17. 41 Ukrainian soldiers deserted their posts and went to the insurgent-controlled Izvaryne border crossing, where they told insurgents that they refused to fight against their "own people". The insurgents allowed them to flee Ukraine, and cross into Russia. By 28 July, the strategic heights of Savur-Mohyla were under Ukrainian control, along with the town of Debaltseve. Insurgents had used Savur-Mohyla to shell Ukrainian troops around the town of Marynivka.

Shelling continued in the Leninskyi and Kyivskyi districts of Donetsk city on 29 July. According to the city administration, these districts were heavily damaged.

According to a report by National Security and Defence Council of Ukraine, crossing points on the border with Russia were attacked from Russian territory at least 153 times since 5 June. 27 border guardsmen were killed in these attacks, and 185 were injured. Government forces made a further advance on 30 July, when they evicted insurgents from Avdiivka, near Donetsk airport. Military operations were paused on 31 July. This was meant to allow international experts to examine the crash site of Malaysia Airlines Flight 17, which is located in Shakhtarsk Raion, where the fiercest battles had been taking place on the previous few days. Monitors were escorted to the site by the Armed Forces of Ukraine.

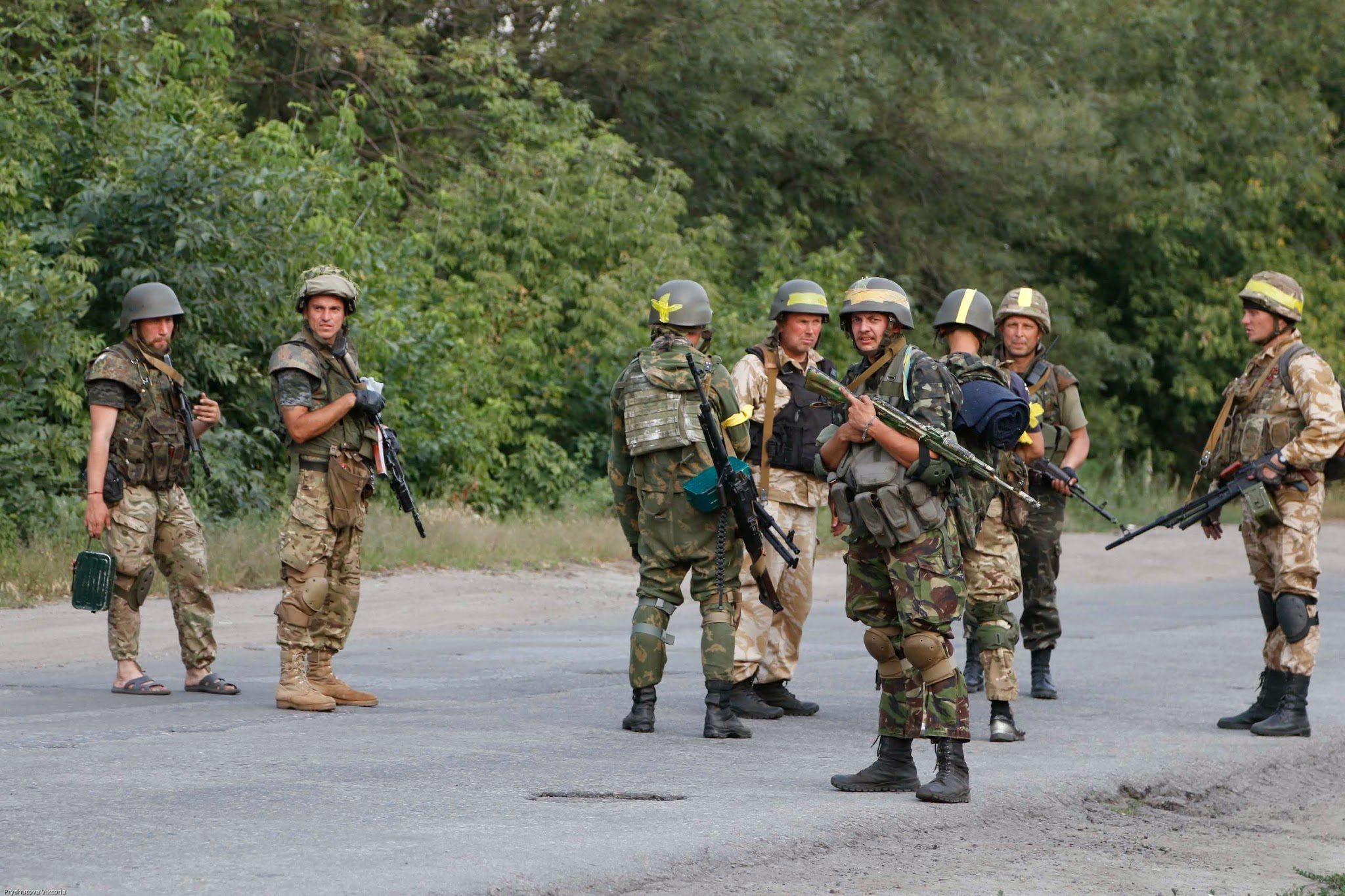
Ukrainian soldiers in the outskirts of Pervomaisk, Luhansk Oblast, 31 July 2014

After fighting severed various transmission lines, Luhansk city lost all access to electrical power on 31 July. Little fuel remained to power emergency generators. Minor skirmishes occurred in Vasylivka and Zhovtneve. Meanwhile, talks between the separatists, Russia, Ukraine, and the OSCE were held in Minsk. Fighting continued in Shakhtarsk. An ambush by the insurgents on government forces there resulted in the deaths of ten soldiers. 11 went missing, and 13 were wounded. A government offensive on the city of Pervomaisk in Luhansk Oblast continued.

Following a series of military defeats, Igor Girkin, insurgent commander for the DPR, urged Russian military intervention, and said that the combat inexperience of his irregular forces, along with recruitment difficulties amongst the local population in Donetsk Oblast had caused the setbacks. He addressed Russian president Vladimir Putin, saying that "Losing this war on the territory that President Vladimir Putin personally named New Russia would threaten the Kremlin's power and, personally, the power of the president". Government forces closed in on Luhansk and Donetsk cities on 3 August.

A number of civilians were killed in fighting in both cities. Luhansk was reported to be "virtually surrounded", with little electrical power or water supply available. The situation in the city of Donetsk was less dire, as trains to Russia were still running, but fighting and shelling did not relent. According to the Ukrainian military, three-quarters of the territory once held by the insurgents had been recaptured. They also said that they had completely cut off supply lines between the DPR and LPR, after more than a week of fighting in Shakhtarsk Raion.

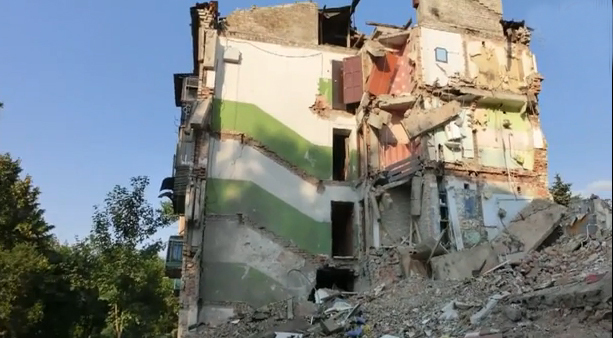
A partially destroyed building in Snizhne, 6 August 2014

After a prolonged battle, Ukrainian troops recaptured the vital town of Yasynuvata on 4 August. At least five soldiers died in the fighting to capture the town, which is a strategic railway junction on the main road between Donetsk and Luhansk cities. The pro-government paramilitary Azov and Shakhtarsk battalions said that they had advanced into Donetsk city, and had begun to "liberate" it. The Ukrainian government said that all civilians should evacuate from Donetsk, and issued statements asking DPR and LPR forces to help establish "humanitarian corridors" to allow civilians in Donetsk, Luhansk and Horlivka to flee. Commenting on the situation in Luhansk, mayor Sergei Kravchenko said "As a result of the blockade and ceaseless rocket attacks, the city is on the verge of a humanitarian catastrophe".

As government troops pushed into Donetsk on 5 August, heavy fighting erupted at 17:00 in the Petrovskyi district of the city. Elsewhere, insurgents recaptured the town of Yasynuvata after a retreat by government forces. A spokesman from the National Security and Defence Council of Ukraine said that the Armed Forces left the town to avoid harming the "peaceful population", and that the city was being evacuated so that it could be "completely liberated". He also said that the railway station remained under government control, and that all railway traffic had been blocked. Fighting between insurgents and government forces across the Donbas region continued "constantly" over the course of the day.

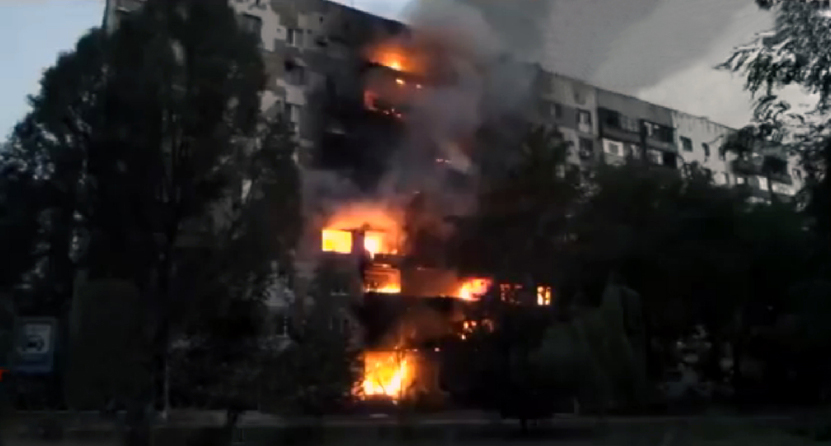
A burning block of flats in Shakhtarsk, 3 August 2014

Fighting and shelling continued around Donetsk on 8 August, with several civilians killed or injured. By 9 August, insurgent commander Igor Girkin said that Donetsk had been "completely encircled" by government forces. This followed the capture of the vital town of Krasnyi Luch by the government, after insurgent-aligned Cossacks stationed there fled. Further skirmishes between insurgents and the Armed Forces took place in Mnohopillia, Stepanivka, Hryhorivka, Krasny Yar, Pobeda, Shyshkove, Komyshne, Novohannivka, Krasna Talivka, Dmytrivka, Sabivka, and Luhansk airport.

Overnight and into 10 August, government forces launched an artillery barrage on Donetsk city. According to a spokesman for the Armed Forces, insurgents began to flee the city during the barrage, and were in a state of "panic and chaos". Hospitals and residential buildings were heavily damaged, and many remaining residents took shelter in basements. The cities of Pervomaisk, Kalynove, Komyshuvakha, in western Luhansk Oblast near Popasna, were captured by government forces on 12 August after heavy fighting.

Heavy shelling of Donetsk continued into 14 August. During this artillery barrage, Igor Girkin resigned from his post as commander of the insurgent forces of the Donetsk People's Republic. He was replaced by Vladimir Kononov, who is known by the nom de guerre Tsar. Girkin's resignation, along with the 7 August resignation of DPR prime minister Alexander Borodai (who was replaced by Alexander Zakharchenko), represented a shift in the nature of the conflict. Given the recent military failings of the DPR and the LPR, Russia decided that it could no longer rely on a patchwork of irregular fighters in the Donbas, and ordered a change in leadership. It abandoned the separatist project, and replaced it with the idea of federalisation of Donbas within Ukraine. To effect this change, it would soon switch gears from hybrid warfare to conventional warfare.

== Russian invasions and first Minsk agreement (2014–2015) ==
=== August 2014 invasion by Russian forces ===
A June–August 2014 map of insurgent-held areas

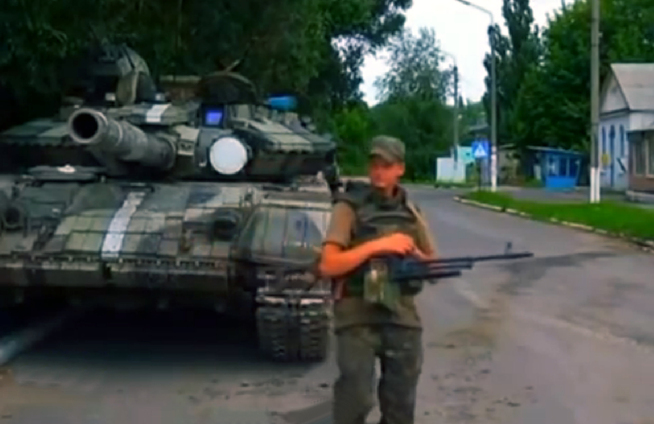
Ukrainian troops guarding a road in the Donbas, August 2014

On 14 August, a convoy of some two dozen armoured personnel carriers and other vehicles with official Russian military plates crossed into Ukraine near the insurgent-controlled Izvaryne border crossing. NATO Secretary General Anders Fogh Rasmussen confirmed that a "Russian incursion" into Ukraine had occurred. Ukrainian president Petro Poroshenko said that Ukrainian artillery engaged and destroyed a "significant" portion of the armoured column. The Russian Defence Ministry denied the existence of any such convoy. Following this incident, the newly appointed prime minister of the DPR Alexander Zakharchenko said that his forces included 1,200 Russian-trained combatants.

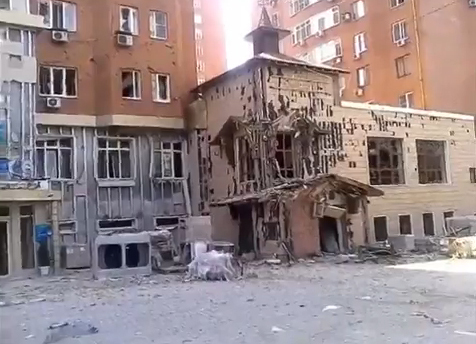
A damaged building in Donetsk, 7 August 2014

A Ukrainian Air Force MiG-29 fighter jet was shot down by the insurgents in Luhansk Oblast on 17 August. Ten civilians were killed during continued shelling in Donetsk. The insurgent-occupied city of Horlivka was encircled by the Armed Forces on 18 August. Government forces also advanced into the edges of Luhansk city. A convoy of refugees from Luhansk was hit by Grad rockets near the village of Novosvitlivka. Dozens of civilians died in the attack, which the National Security and Defence Council of Ukraine blamed on the insurgents. Insurgents denied attacking any refugee convoys. DPR prime minister Aleksandr Zakharchenko stated that if the Ukrainian government made "reasonable proposals to lay down arms, close borders, we will talk on equal terms as equal partners". He added, however, that the government "must recognise us as a state, now it is already impossible to ask for a certain degree of autonomy".

After having edged into Luhansk city on 18 August, government forces began to advance through the city "block by block" on 19 August. Fighting was heard in streets across the city, and shelling of many insurgent-occupied districts continued. There was also fighting Makiivka and Ilovaisk, two cities just outside Donetsk city. A spokesman for the Internal Affairs Ministry said that government forces were "clearing" Ilovaisk of insurgents, and later captured most of the city. The headquarters of the DPR in Donetsk city were also shelled. Fighting across Donetsk Oblast on 19 August resulted in the deaths of 34 civilians. By early evening on 20 August, government forces said that they had recaptured "significant parts" of the city of Luhansk, after a series of running battles in streets throughout the day.

On 23 August heavily armed men, believed to be Russian troops, erected a roadblock southwest of Amvrosiivka, in the vicinity of Kolosky, approximately 10 kilometers from the border. The next day, Ukrainian media reported that Russian army armoured forces equipped with 250 vehicles and artillery had entered Amvrosiivka, in what seemed to be the beginning of a major offensive on Mariupol.

By 25 August, an insurgent counter-offensive had stalled the government's advance on Donetsk and Luhansk cities. Insurgents attacked government positions in Shchastia, and along the Siverskyi Donets River in Luhansk Oblast. As this attack occurred, insurgents in Luhansk received reinforcements. Government forces near Ilovaisk and Amvrosiivka in Donetsk Oblast became surrounded by insurgents, after their attempt to take Ilovaisk was halted by heavy shelling. The pro-government volunteer Donbas Battalion, trapped in the city for days by the insurgents, accused the Ukrainian government and Armed Forces of "abandoning" them.

Other volunteer battalions, such as the Azov and Dnipro, left Ilovaisk after encountering heavy resistance. Donbas Battalion leader Semen Semenchenko said "I think it is profitable for the defence ministry not to send help, but to achieve a situation where volunteer battalions start blaming each other about who helped who".

A column of armoured vehicles crossed into Ukraine from Russia near Novoazovsk on 25 August. There had been no insurgent formations within 30 kilometres (18 2/3 mi) of this area for many weeks. Heavy fighting took place in the village of Markyne, 7 kilometres (4 1/4 mi) from Novoazovsk. Insurgents used the village as a base to shell Novoazovsk. A spokesman for the National Security and Defence Council of Ukraine said that the entrance of the column into Ukraine was an attempt "by the Russian military in the guise of Donbas fighters to open a new area of military confrontation".

According to the Mariupol city website, the Dnipro and Donbas battalions repelled the attack, and the "invaders" retreated to the border. Russian Foreign Minister Sergei Lavrov said he had no knowledge of the incident, and suggested that reports of the incident being an incursion by Russian forces were "disinformation". Directly prior to the appearance of the column, the area was heavily shelled. The nearest insurgent artillery positions were beyond the range of this area.

Villagers from Kolosky in Starobesheve Raion told Reuters that military men with Russian accents and no identifying insignias had appeared in the village at the weekend of 23–24 August. They set up a roadblock near the village. The men wore distinctive white armbands. The villagers referred to them as "little green men", a term that was used to refer to the irregular Russian forces that took control of Crimea from February 2014. Following the appearance of these men, ten soldiers in green military uniforms with white armbands were detained by Ukrainian forces at Dzerkalne. This village is north of Novoazovosk, 7 kilometres (4 1/4 mi) from Kolosky, and about 20 kilometres (12 mi) from the Russian border.

The Russian military confirmed that these men were Russian paratroopers and that they had been captured. The Russian Defence Ministry said the men had entered Ukraine "by mistake during an exercise". The Security Service of Ukraine (SBU) released videos that they said were interviews with the captive Russian soldiers. In one of the videos, a soldier said that their commanders had sent them on a 70-kilometre (43 1/2 mi) march "without explaining its purpose or warning that they would be in Ukrainian territory, where they were apprehended by Ukrainian forces and surrendered without a fight".

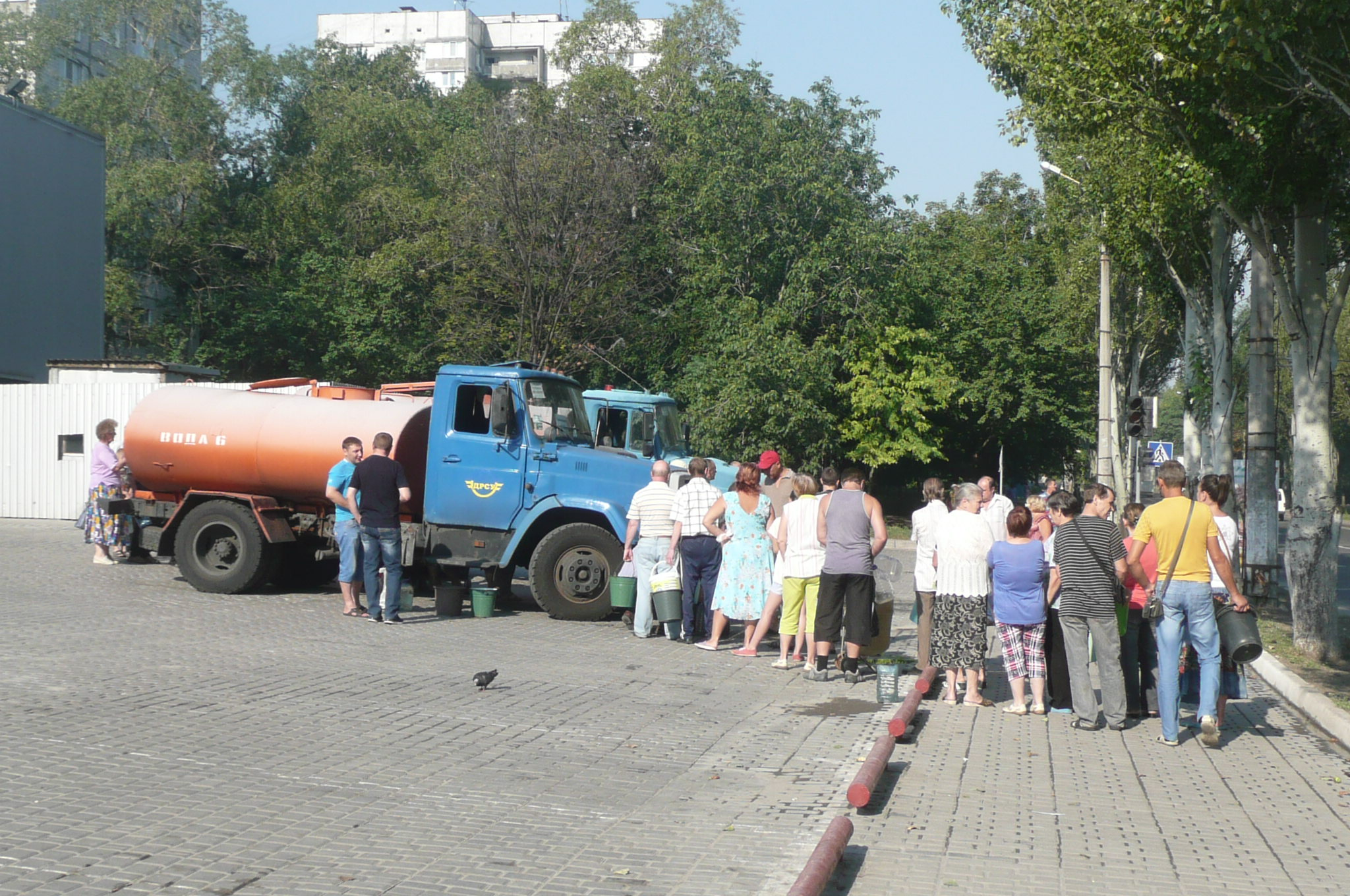
People queueing for water in Donetsk, 22 August 2014

Insurgents pushed into Novoazovsk on 27 August. Whilst the Ukrainian government said they were in "total control" of Novoazovsk, town mayor Oleg Sidorkin confirmed that the insurgents had captured it. He also said that "dozens" of tanks and armoured vehicles had been used by the insurgents in their assault on the town. At least four civilians were injured by insurgent shelling. To the north, close to Starobesheve, Ukrainian forces said that they spotted a column of 100 armoured vehicles, tanks, and Grad rocket lorries that was heading south, toward Novoazovsk. They said these vehicles were marked with "white circles or triangles", similar to the white armbands seen on the captured Russian paratroopers earlier in the week. Amidst pressure on this new third front, government forces retreated westward toward Mariupol.

They evacuated the town of Starobesheve, among other areas in the 75-kilometre (47 mi) stretch of borderland from the Sea of Azov to the existing insurgent-held territories. A report by The New York Times described the retreating soldiers as "exhausted, filthy and dismayed". Western officials described the new insurgent actions as a "stealth invasion" by the Russian Federation, with tanks, artillery and infantry said to have crossed into Ukraine from Russian territory. US State Department spokesman Jen Psaki said that "these incursions indicate a Russian-directed counteroffensive is likely underway", and Ukrainian president Petro Poroshenko said "An invasion of Russian forces has taken place". A statement by the National Security and Defence Council of Ukraine (NSDC) later said that Novoazovsk had been captured by "Russian troops", despite earlier denials by the Ukrainian government.

According to the NSDC, Ukrainian troops withdrew from Novoazovsk to save lives, and were instead preparing defences in Mariupol. Meanwhile, fighting continued in and around Donetsk city. Shells fell on the Kalininskyi district of Donetsk, and the Donbas Battalion continued to fight against the insurgents that had trapped them in Ilovaisk for days. NATO commander Brig. Gen. Nico Tak said on 28 August that "well over" 1,000 Russian soldiers were operating in the Donbas conflict zone. Amidst what The New York Times described as "chaos" in the conflict zone, the insurgents re-captured Savur-Mohyla.

Despite these advances by pro-Russian forces, the National Guard of Ukraine temporarily retook the city of Komsomolske in Starobesheve Raion of Donetsk Oblast on 29 August. However, two days later, Ukrainian forces retreated from the city, and Komsomolske was once again taken by the DPR forces. Elsewhere, Ukrainian forces retreated from Novosvitlivka after being attacked by what they said were "Russian tanks". They said that every house in the village was destroyed. The trapped Donbas Battalion withdrew from Ilovaisk on 30 August after negotiating an agreement with pro-Russian forces. According to some of the troops who withdrew from Ilovaisk, DPR forces violated the agreement and fired on them whilst they retreated under white flags, killing as many as several dozen.

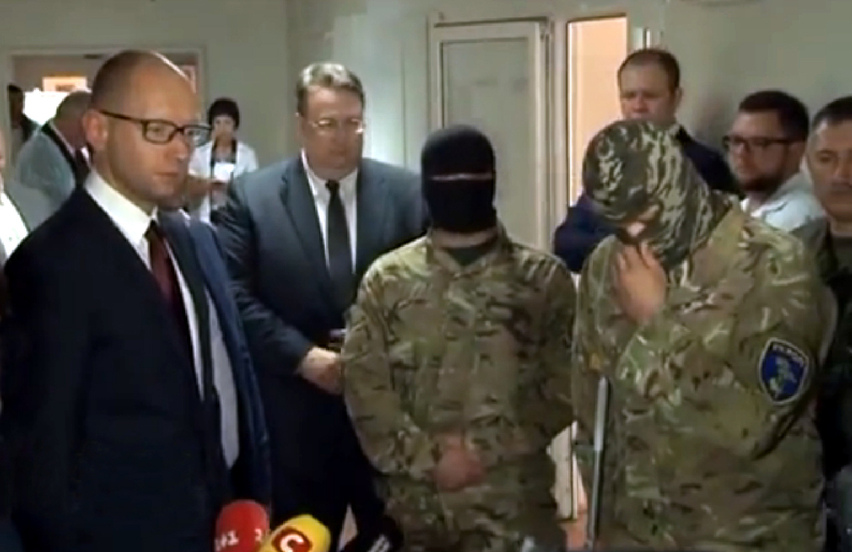
Ukrainian Prime Minister Arseniy Yatsenyuk awarding Donbas Battalion volunteers, 1 September 2014

A Ukrainian patrol boat in the Sea of Azov was hit by shore-based artillery fire on 31 August. Eight sailors were rescued from the sinking boat, whilst two crew-members were missing. Former insurgent commander Igor Girkin said that the insurgents had "dealt the enemy their first naval defeat". Government forces withdrew from Luhansk International Airport on 1 September, despite having held the airport from insurgent attacks for weeks prior. The airport saw fierce fighting on the night before the withdrawal, and Ukrainian officials said that their forces at the airport had been attacked by a column of Russian tanks. Clashes also continued at Donetsk International Airport.

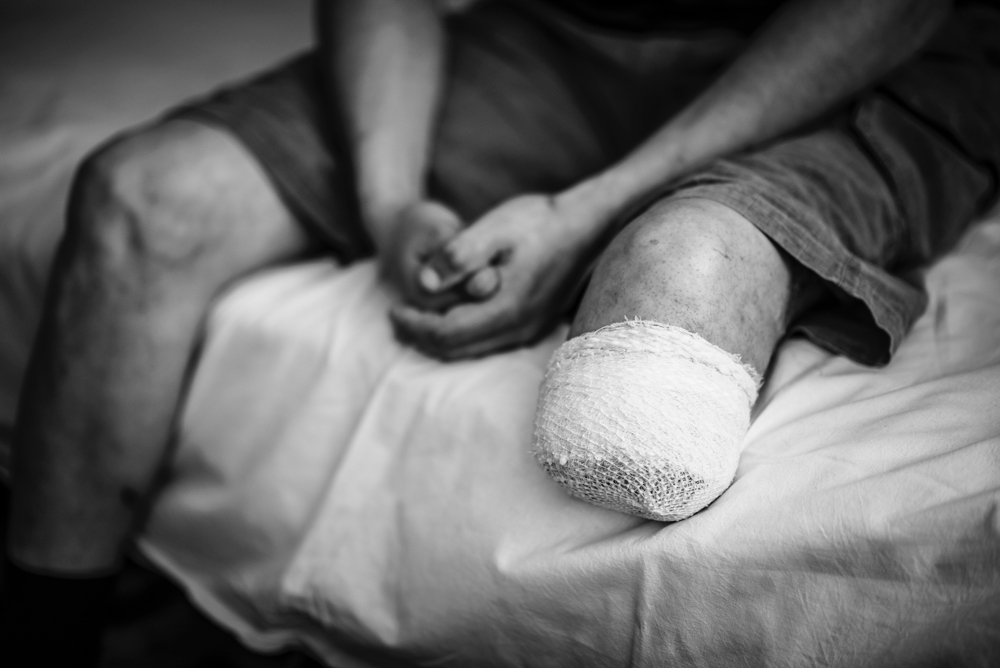
Victims of War in Ukraine - Kyiv Hospital - Exhibition by Still Miracle Photography 02

Heavy fighting was observed by OSCE monitors near the villages of Shyrokyne and Bezimenne on 4 September. Respectively, these villages are 24 kilometres (15 mi) and 34 kilometres (21 mi) east of Mariupol. Ukrainian officials in Mariupol said that the situation there "was worsening by the hour", and that there was an imminent danger of an attack on the city. DPR forces came within 5 kilometres (3 mi) of the city on 4 September, but their advance was repulsed by an overnight counter-attack launched by the Ukrainian military and the Azov Battalion. They were driven back about 20 kilometres (12 1/2 mi) east of the city. Constant shelling was heard on the outskirts of Mariupol.

=== September 2014 Minsk ceasefire agreement ===
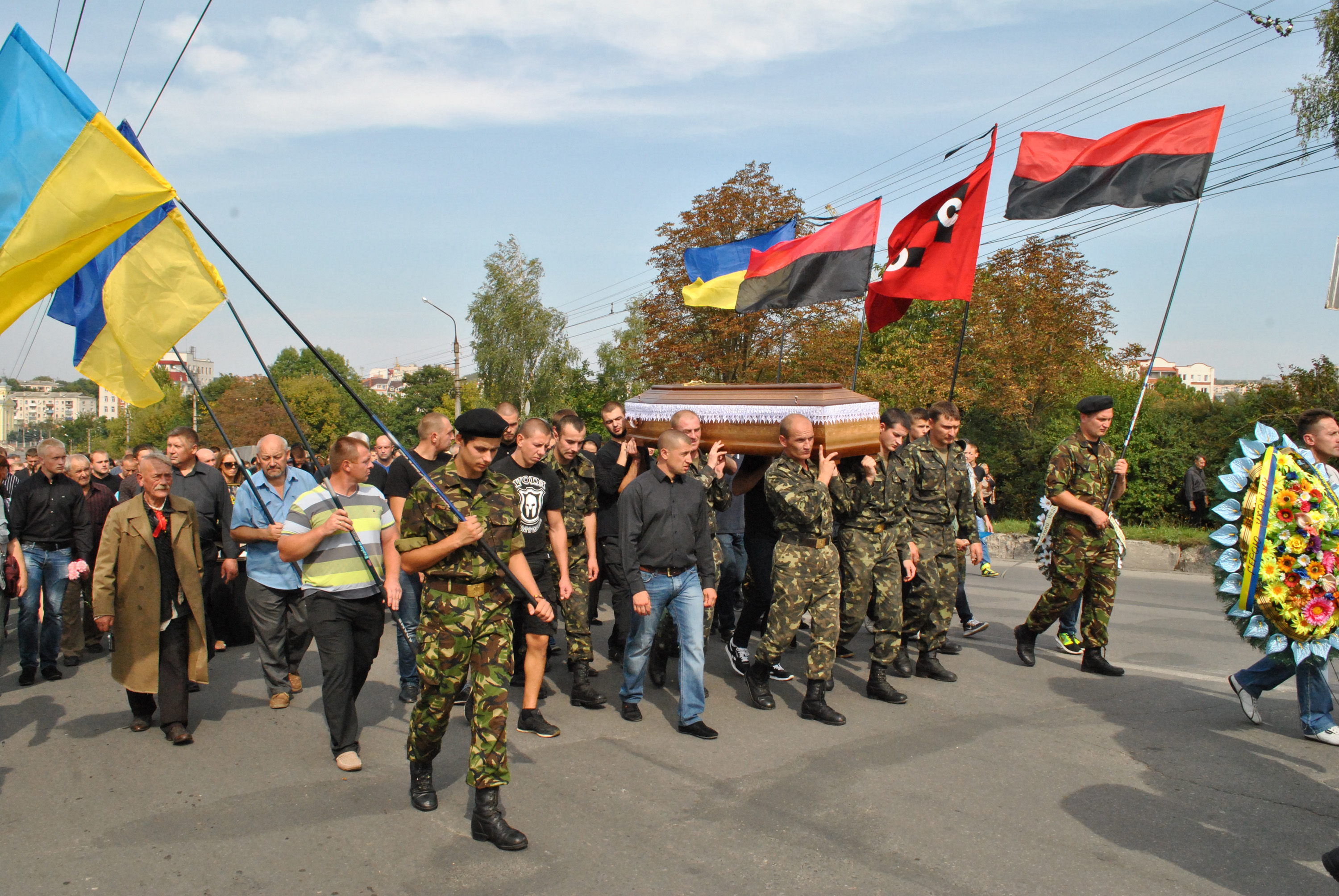
A funeral service for a Ukrainian soldier, 11 September 2014

After days of peace talks in Minsk under the auspices of the Organisation for Security and Co-operation in Europe (OSCE), Ukraine, Russia, the DPR, and the LPR agreed to a ceasefire on 5 September.

In the Minsk Protocol, all sides agreed: an immediate ceasefire, monitored by the OSCE; immediate release of all prisoners; withdrawal of all illegal armed groups, foreign soldiers and mercenaries from Ukraine; withdrawal of heavy weaponry from the frontline; local elections in the Donbas under Ukrainian law; the granting of self-governance ("special status") to rebel-held parts of the Donbas; OSCE monitoring of the Russian-Ukrainian state border; and an amnesty for those involved in the war. Humanitarian corridors were meant to be maintained so that civilians could leave affected areas. Use of the Russian language in the Donbas would be protected by law.

According to The New York Times, the agreement was an "almost verbatim" replication of Ukrainian president Petro Poroshenko's failed June "15-point peace plan". Russia started a more robust train and equip operation to strengthen separatists forces. DPR and LPR leaders said that they retained their desire for full independence from Ukraine, despite these concessions. Russian president Vladimir Putin and Ukrainian president Poroshenko discussed the ceasefire on 6 September. Both parties said that they were satisfied with the ceasefire, and that it was generally holding.

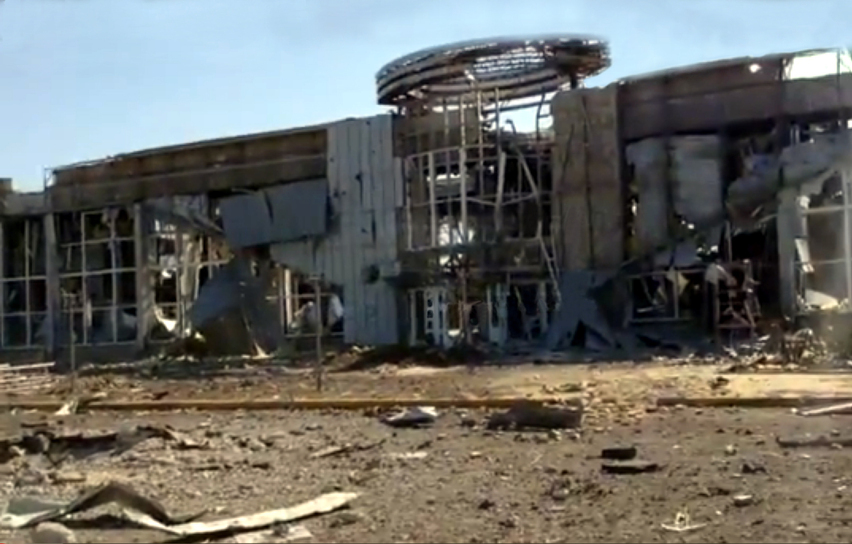
A destroyed terminal at Luhansk airport, 4 September 2014

The ceasefire was broken multiple times on the night of 6–7 September, and into the day on 7 September. These violations resulted in the deaths of four Ukrainian soldiers, whilst 29 were injured. Heavy shelling by the insurgents was reported on the eastern outskirts of Mariupol, and OSCE monitors said that the Ukrainian government had fired rockets from Donetsk International Airport. The OSCE said that these breaches of the agreement would not cause the ceasefire to collapse. Ukrainian president Petro Poroshenko said on 10 September that "70% of Russian troops have been moved back across the border", and also added that this action gave him "hope that the peace initiatives have good prospects".

Ceasefire violations continued, however. In line with the Minsk Protocol, OSCE monitors said that they observed a prisoner exchange near Avdiivka on 12 September. OSCE monitors documented violations of the Minsk Protocol in numerous areas of Donetsk Oblast from 13 to 15 September. Two of the armoured vehicles that the monitors were travelling in were struck by shrapnel, rendering one of the vehicles inoperable and forcing the monitors to retreat.

According to the monitors, troop and equipment movements were being carried out by both DPR and Ukrainian forces. They also said that there were "command and control issues" amongst both parties to the conflict. Ukrainian president Petro Poroshenko said on 21 September that the Armed Forces of Ukraine lost between 60% and 65% of its total active equipment over the course of the war.

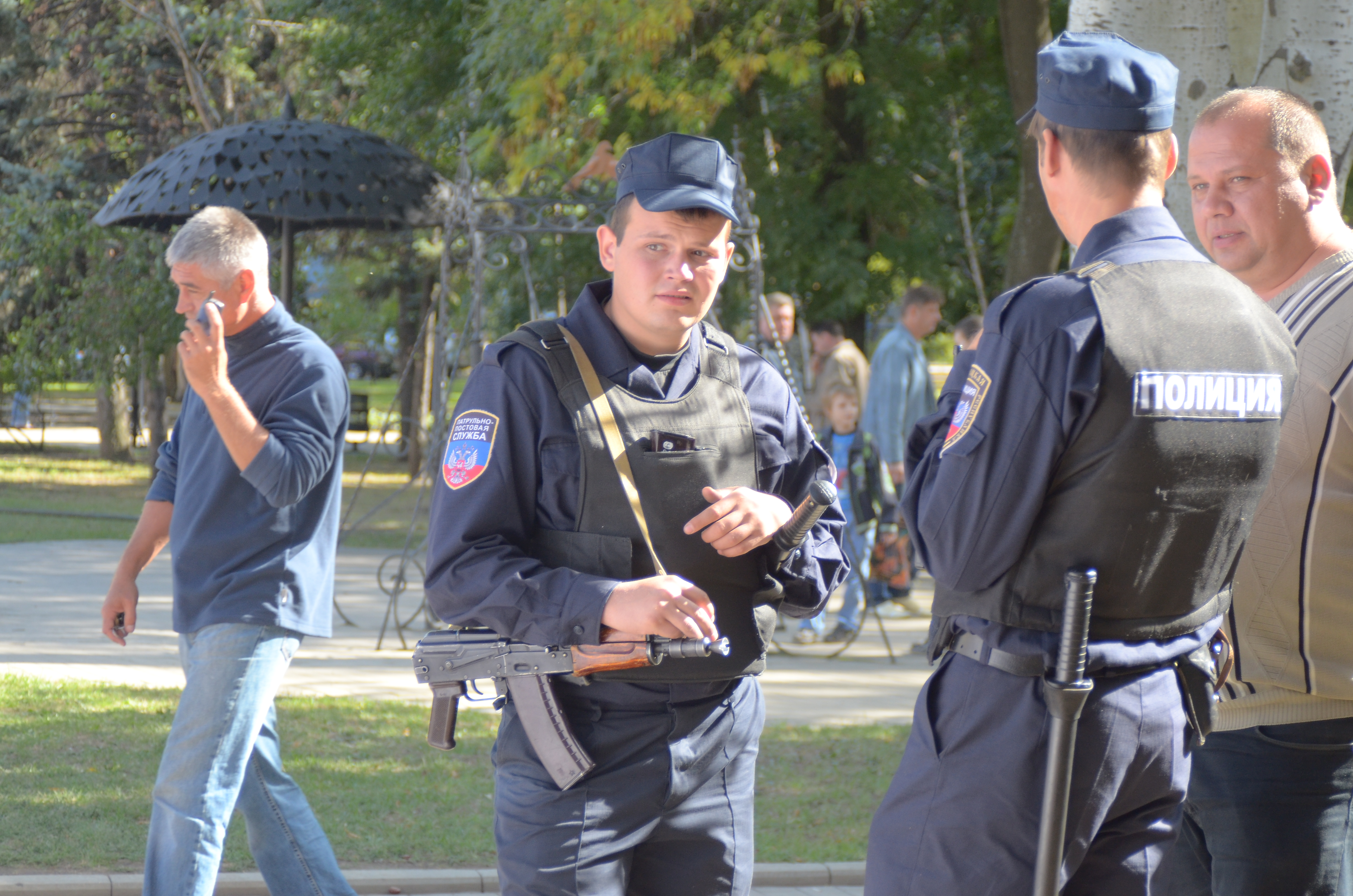
A DPR policemen in Donetsk, 20 September 2014

According to the OSCE on 25 September, all parties agreed that the fighting had "subsided in recent days", and that the "situation along 70%" of the buffer zone was "calm".

In the most significant incident since the start of the ceasefire, seven Ukrainian soldiers died on 29 September when a tank shell struck the armoured personnel carrier that they were travelling in near Donetsk International Airport. A skirmish ensued, leaving many soldiers wounded. Over the next few days, fighting continued around Donetsk International Airport, whilst Donetsk city itself came under heavy shelling. Amidst this renewed violence, OSCE chairman Didier Burkhalter issued a statement that "urged all sides to immediately stop fighting".

According to a report released by the UN Office of the United Nations High Commissioner for Human Rights (OHCHR) on 8 October, the ceasefire implemented by the Minsk Protocol was becoming "increasingly fragile". It said that at least 331 people had been killed since the start of ceasefire, and that the most fierce fighting took place around Donetsk International Airport, Debaltseve, and Shchastia. The report said that the majority of civilian deaths were caused by both insurgent and Ukrainian shelling.

=== November 2014 separatist elections and aftermath ===
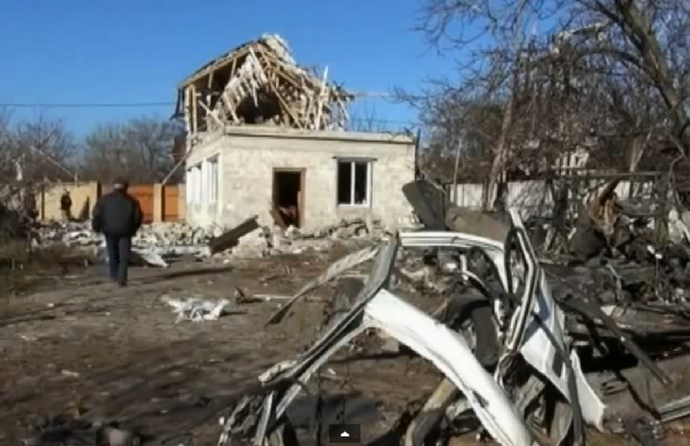
A Donetsk suburb after shelling, 7 November 2014

In line with the Minsk agreement, on 16 September 2014, Ukraine's parliament passed a law that would grant limited self-rule to the rebel-held territory, amnesty for combatants, and scheduled elections there for 7 December.

However, the separatists then announced their own elections in November. The OSCE chairman Didier Burkhalter said this violated the Minsk agreement and would "further complicate its implementation". The elections were not agreed to by all sides, would not involve Ukrainian parties and candidates, would not be observed by the OSCE, and would be held while Russian-backed militants controlled the region. Russia said it "respected" the vote, treating the new authorities as representing the "people of Donbas" in future negotiations.

In response to the unlawful elections, Ukrainian president Poroshenko asked parliament to revoke the "special status" granted to rebel-held areas. DPR deputy prime minister Andrei Purgin then said that Ukrainian forces had launched "all-out war" against the DPR and LPR on 6 November. Ukrainian officials denied this. Concurrently, separatist representatives requested a re-drafting of the Minsk Protocol. Intermittent shelling of Donetsk renewed on 5 November.

OSCE monitors reported on 8 November that there were large movements of unmarked heavy equipment in separatist-held territory. These included armoured personnel carriers, lorries, petrol tankers, and tanks, which were being manned and escorted by men in dark green uniforms without insignias. Ukrainian government spokesmen said that these were Russian troops, but this could not be independently verified. Overnight into 9 November, intense shelling from both government and insurgent positions rocked Donetsk. OSCE chairman Didier Burkhalter said that he was "very concerned" about the "resurgence of violence". OSCE monitors observed more munitions convoys in separatist-held territory on 9 November. These included 17 unmarked green ZiL lorries loaded with ammunition at Sverdlovsk, and 17 similar Kamaz lorries towing howitzers at Zuhres. Another convoy of 43 green military lories, some towing howitzers and rocket launchers, was observed by OSCE monitors in Donetsk on 11 November.

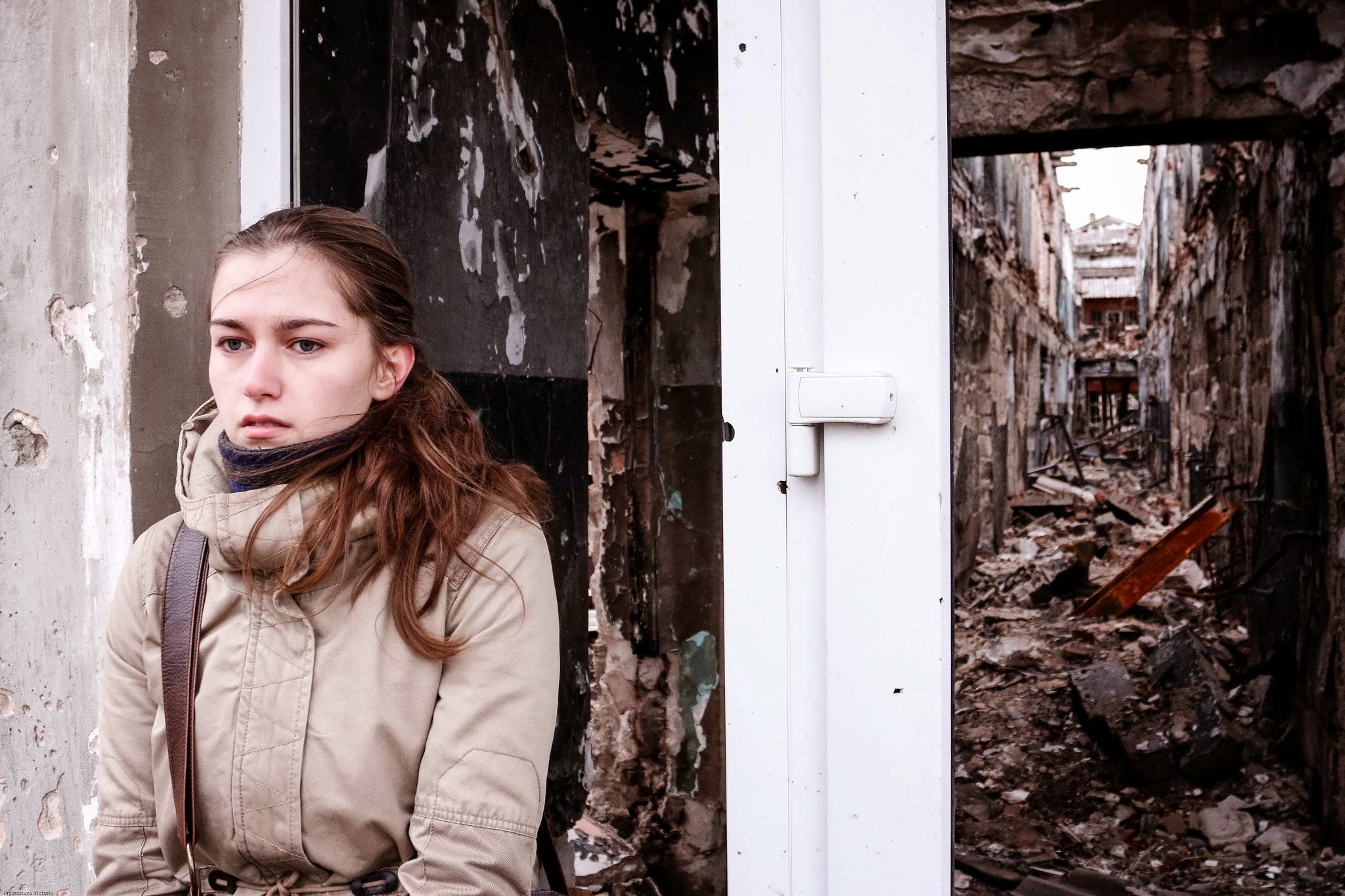
Damaged building in Kurakhove, 26 November 2014

Following the reports of these troop and equipment movements, NATO General Philip Breedlove said on 12 November that Russian troops and heavy equipment had crossed into Ukraine during the preceding week. In response, the Ukrainian Defence Ministry said that it was preparing for a renewed offensive by pro-Russian forces. Russian Defence Ministry spokesman Major General Igor Konashenkov said "there was and is no evidence" to support NATO's statement.

By 2 December, at least 1,000 people had died during fighting in the Donbas, since the signing of the Minsk Protocol in early September. A BBC report said that the ceasefire had been "a fiction". Fighting lessened significantly during December. A report by the International Crisis Group stated that the late 2014 financial crisis in Russia, in tandem with American and European economic sanctions, deterred further advances by pro-Russian forces. The report also raised concerns about the potential for "humanitarian catastrophe" in separatist-controlled Donbas during the cold winter months, saying that the separatists were unable "to provide basic services for the population".

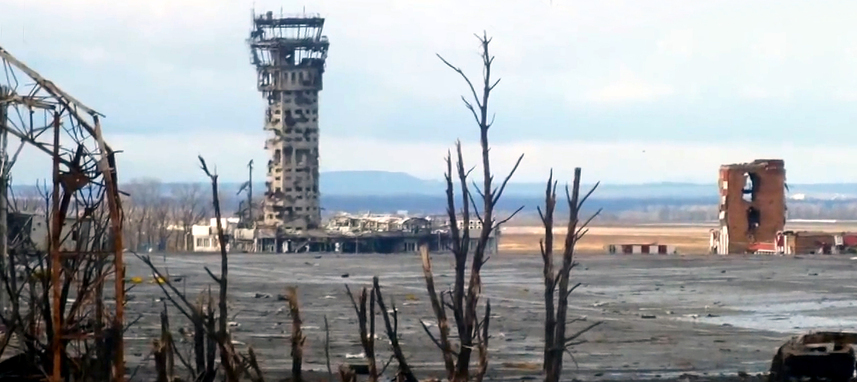
The ruins of Donetsk International Airport, December 2014. The control tower has since been completely destroyed.

In line with the Minsk Protocol, more prisoner exchanges took place during the week of 21–27 December. More OSCE-organised talks were held in Minsk during that week, but they reached no result. In a press conference on 29 December, Ukrainian President Petro Poroshenko said that the Minsk Protocol was becoming effective "point by point", and also said that "progress" was being made. Since the signing of the Protocol, over 1,500 people held by the separatists had been released as part of the prisoner exchanges. Whereas Ukrainian forces had been losing about 100 men per day prior to the Protocol, only about 200 had been killed in the four months since its signing. Poroshenko also said that he believed that conflict would only end if Russian troops were to leave Donbas.

=== Escalation in January 2015 ===
OSCE monitors reported a "rise in tensions" following New Year's Day. Numerous ceasefire violations were recorded, with most occurring near Donetsk International Airport. Infighting amongst insurgent groups broke out in Luhansk Oblast. In one incident, LPR militants said that they had killed Alexander Bednov, the leader of the pro-Russian "Batman Battalion", on 2 January 2015. LPR officials said that Bednov had been running an "illegal prison", and that he had engaged in torturing prisoners. In another incident, the leader of an Antratsyt-based Don Cossack militant group, Nikolai Kozitsyn, said that the territory controlled by his group, claimed by the Luhansk People's Republic, had become part of the "Russian empire", and that Russian president Vladimir Putin was its "emperor".

An intercity bus stopped at a government checkpoint in Buhas was hit by a Grad rocket on 13 January, killing 12 civilians (see Volnovakha bus attack). Ukrainian president Petro Poroshenko declared a day of national mourning.

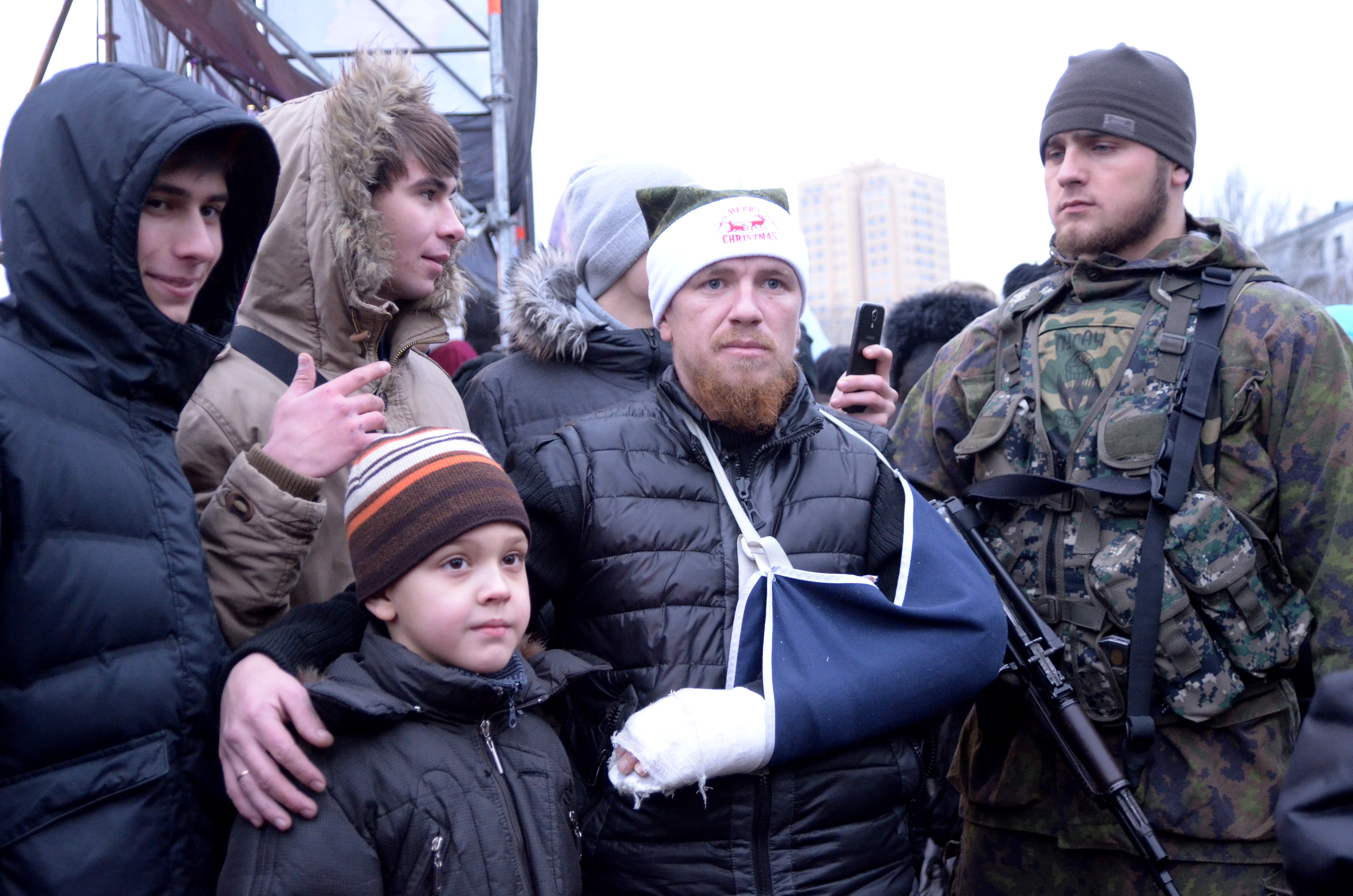
DPR Sparta Battalion commander Arseny Pavlov, Donetsk, 25 December 2014

The new terminal building at Donetsk International Airport, which had been a site of fighting between Ukrainian and separatist troops since May 2014, was captured by the DPR forces on 15 January. In the days prior to the capturing, the airport was heavily barraged by separatist rocket fire. DPR leader Alexander Zakharchenko stated that the capture of the airport was the first step toward regaining territory lost to Ukrainian forces during the middle of 2014. He said "Let our countrymen hear this: We will not just give up our land. We will either take it back peacefully, or like that", referring to the capture of the airport.

Such an offensive by separatist forces would signal the complete breakdown of the ceasefire. Ukrainian forces said that there had been "no order to retreat" from the airport, and DPR parliament chairman Andrey Purgin said that while DPR forces had gained control of the terminal buildings, fighting was ongoing because "the Ukrainians have lots of places to hide". Concurrently, a new round of Minsk talks, scheduled for 16 January by the Trilateral Contact Group on Ukraine, was called off after DPR and LPR leaders Alexander Zakharchenko and Igor Plotnitsky refused to attend.

A government military operation at the weekend of 17–18 January resulted in Ukrainian forces recapturing most of Donetsk International Airport. According to Ukrainian NSDC representative Andriy Lysenko, the operation restored the lines of control established by the Minsk Protocol, and therefore did not constitute a violation of it. The operation caused fighting to move toward Donetsk proper, resulting in heavy shelling of residential areas of the city that border the airport. DPR authorities said that they halted government forces at Putylivskiy bridge, which connects the airport and the city proper. The bridge, which is strategically important, was destroyed during the fighting. OSCE monitors reported that shelling had caused heavy damage in the Donetsk residential districts of Kyivskyi, Kirovskyi, Petrovskyi, and Voroshilovskyi.

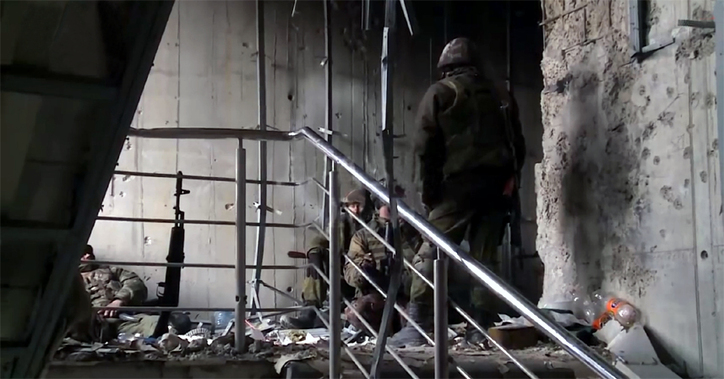
DPR Somalia Battalion in the new terminal building of Donetsk Airport on 16 January 2015

Ukrainian President Petro Poroshenko said on 21 January that Russia had deployed more than 9,000 soldiers and 500 tanks, artillery units, and armoured personnel carriers in the Donbas. An article that appeared in The Daily Telegraph said that deployment appeared to be "a response to Kyiv's success" in retaining control of Donetsk International Airport. The same day, Ukrainian forces attempted to surround the airport in an attempt to push back the insurgents.

As Ukrainian and DPR forces fought away from the airport, a group of insurgents stormed the first and third floors of the new terminal building. Ukrainian troops held out on the second floor of the building until the ceiling collapsed, killing several soldiers. The remaining Ukrainian forces were either captured, killed, or were forced to withdraw from the airport, allowing DPR forces to overrun it. According to one volunteer, 37 Ukrainian troops died. The Daily Telegraph called the Ukrainian defeat at the airport "devastating".

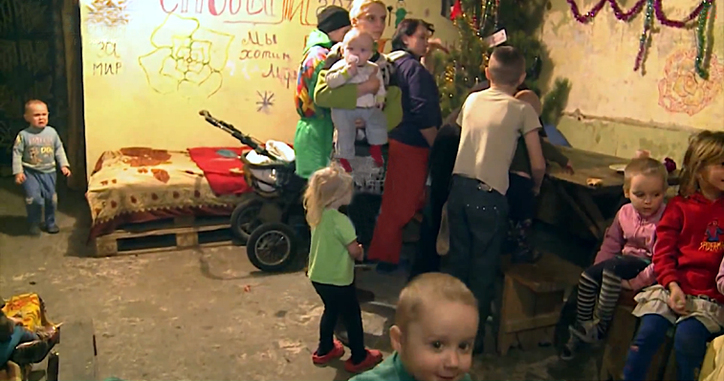
Donetsk civilians living in a bomb shelter, January 2015

Following this victory, separatist forces began to attack Ukrainian forces along the line of control in Donetsk and Luhansk oblasts. Particularly heavy fighting broke out along the Siverskyi Donets River, to the north-west of Luhansk city. Separatist forces captured a Ukrainian checkpoint at Krymske, attacked other checkpoints in the area, and shelled villages near Shchastia.

Separatist forces began an assault on the government-controlled town of Debaltseve, barraging it with artillery fire. The DPR launched an attack on Mariupol from Shyrokyne on 24 January. A hail of Grad rockets killed at least 30 people, and wounded another 83. Heavy fighting continued in Debaltseve over the next week, resulting in many civilian and combatant casualties.

French president François Hollande and German chancellor Angela Merkel put forth a new peace plan on 7 February. The Franco-German plan, drawn up after talks with Ukrainian president Petro Poroshenko and Russian president Vladimir Putin, was seen as a revival of the Minsk Protocol. President Hollande said that the plan was the "last chance" for resolution of the conflict. The plan was put forth in response to American proposals to send armaments to the Ukrainian government, something that Chancellor Merkel said would only result in a worsening of the crisis.

Fighting worsened in the run-up to the scheduled 11 February talks to discuss the Franco-German peace plan. DPR forces shelled the city of Kramatorsk on 10 February, which had last seen fighting in July 2014. The shelling targeted the city's Armed Forces headquarters, but also hit a nearby residential area. Seven people were killed, while 26 were wounded. The pro-government Azov Battalion launched an offensive to recapture separatist-controlled areas on the outskirts of Mariupol, centred on the village of Shyrokyne. Battalion commander Andriy Biletsky said his forces were moving toward Novoazovsk.

== Static war (2015–2022) ==
=== Minsk II ceasefire and denouement ===
Map of separatist-held areas from the conclusion of the Battle of Debaltseve in 2015 until the 2022 Russian invasion of Ukraine

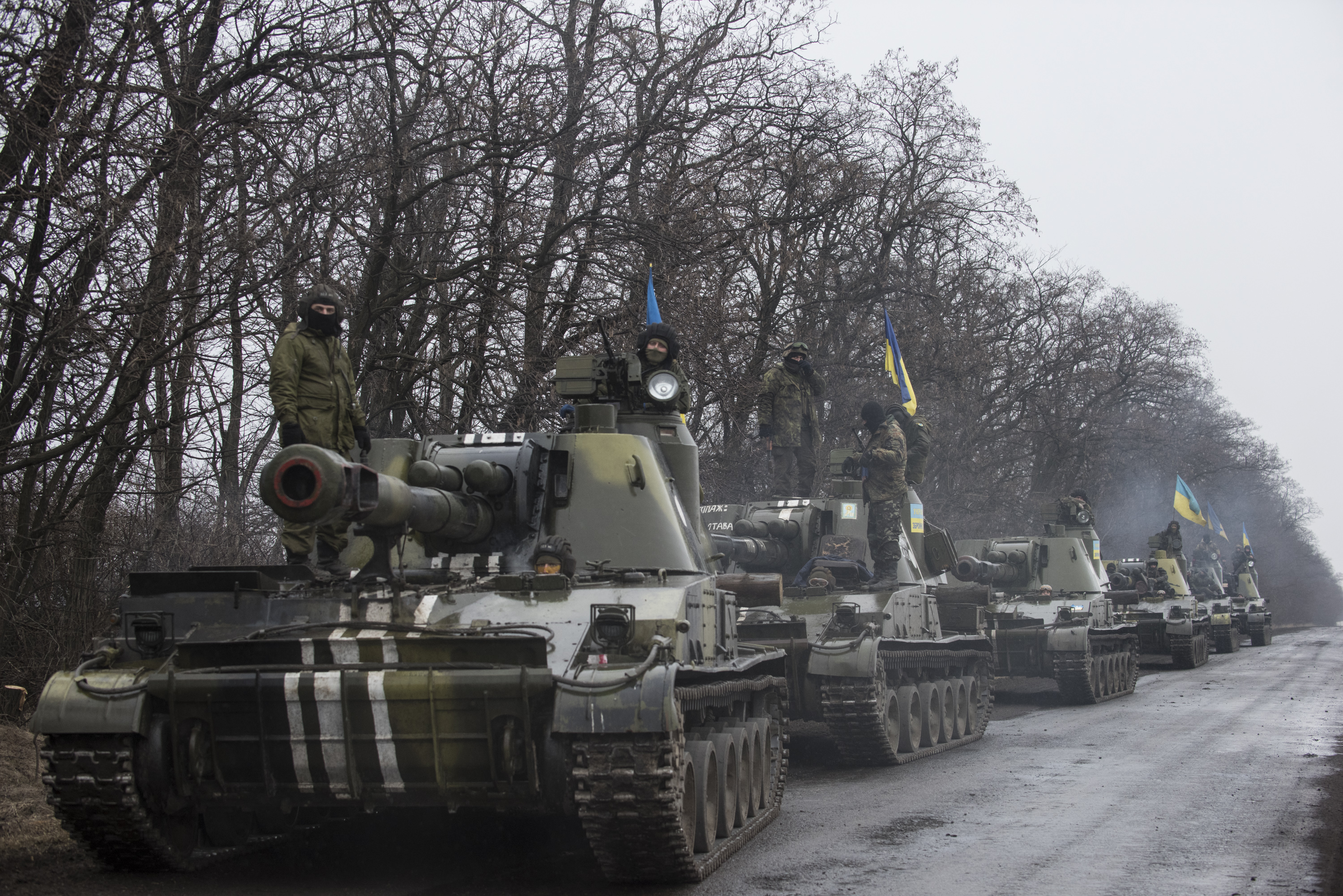
The withdrawal of Ukrainian heavy weaponry, March 2015

The scheduled summit at Minsk on 11 February 2015 resulted in the signing of a new package of peacemaking measures, called Minsk II, on 12 February. The plan, similar in content to the failed Minsk Protocol, called for an unconditional ceasefire, to begin on 15 February, amongst many other measures. Despite the signing of Minsk II, fighting continued around Debaltseve. DPR forces said that ceasefire did not apply to Debaltseve, and continued their offensive. Ukrainian forces were forced to withdraw from the Debaltseve area on 18 February, leaving separatist forces in control of it.

In the week after the fall of Debaltseve to pro-Russian forces, fighting in the conflict zone abated. DPR and LPR forces began to withdraw artillery from the front lines as specified by Minsk II on 24 February, and Ukraine did so on 26 February. Ukraine reported that it had suffered no casualties during 24–26 February, something that had not occurred since early January 2015.

Minor skirmishes continued into March, but the ceasefire was largely observed across the combat zone. Ukrainian and separatist forces had withdrawn most of the heavy weaponry specified in Minsk II by 10 March. Minor violations of the ceasefire continued throughout March and into April, though it continued to hold, and the numbers of casualties reported by both sides were greatly reduced.

Fighting flared up on 3 June 2015, when DPR insurgents launched an attack on government-controlled Marinka. Artillery and tanks were utilised in the battle there, which was described as the heaviest fighting since the signing of Minsk II.

An anti-war protest took place in Donetsk city on 15 June. The protest, the first of its kind in pro-Russian separatist-controlled territory, called for an end to the fighting in the Donbas. About 500 people, who had gathered outside the RSA building, shouted, "Stop the war!", "Give us back our houses, our homes are broken!", and "Get out of here!" Specifically, protesters demanded that the separatists cease firing rocket attacks from residential areas on the outskirts of Donetsk.

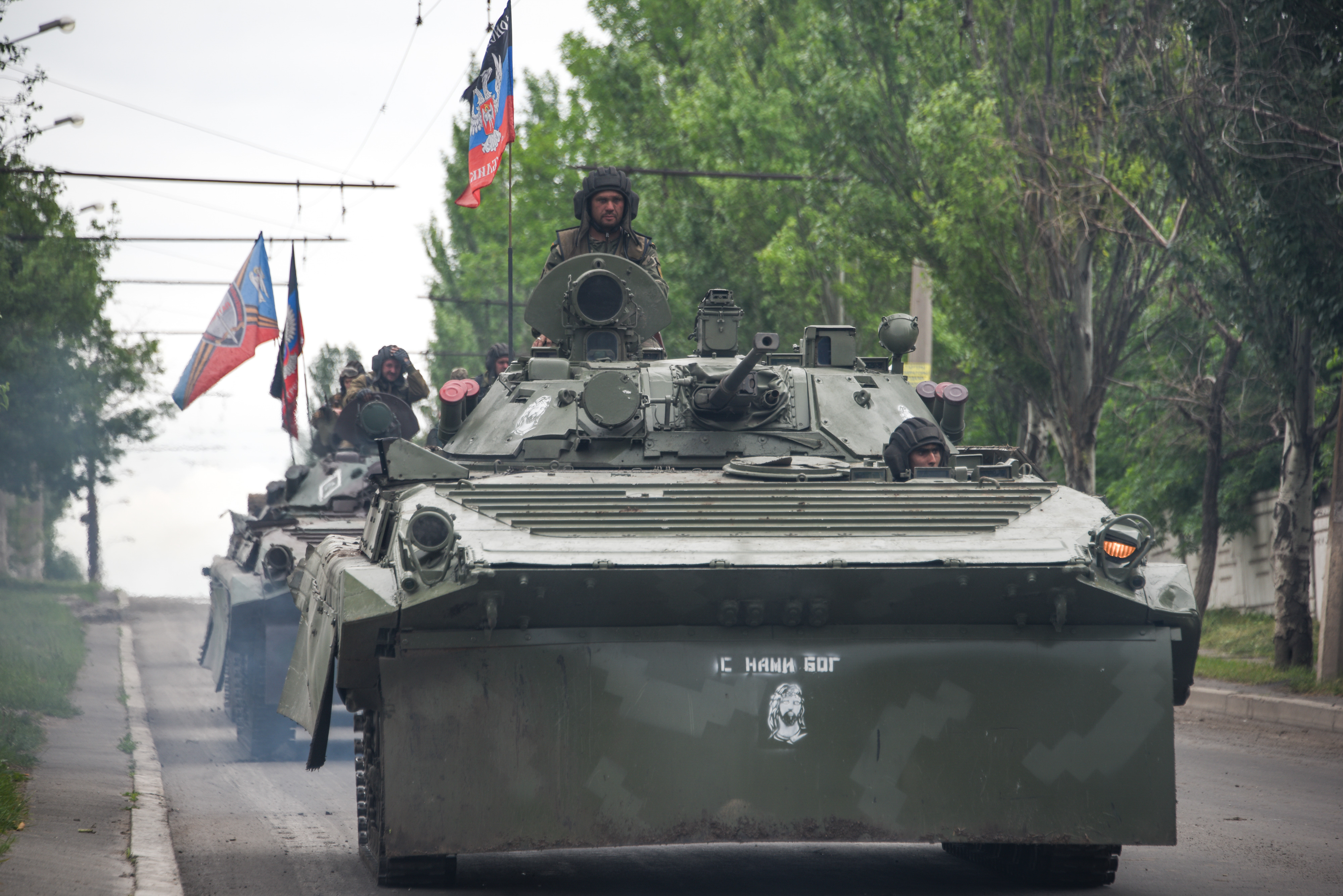
DPR armoured vehicles near Donetsk, May 2015

Whilst all parties to the conflict continued to support implementation of the measures specified by Minsk II, minor skirmishes continued on a daily basis through June and July 2015. Ukrainian troops suffered losses on a daily basis, and the ceasefire was labelled "unworkable" and "impossible to implement". Despite constant fighting and shelling along the line of contact, no territorial changes occurred. This state of stalemate led the war to be labelled a "frozen conflict".

Following months of ceasefire violations, the Ukrainian government, the DPR and the LPR jointly agreed to halt all fighting, starting on 1 September 2015. This agreement coincided with the start of the school year in Ukraine, and was intended to allow for another attempt at implementing the points of Minsk II. By 12 September, German Foreign Minister Frank-Walter Steinmeier said that the ceasefire had been holding, and that the parties to the conflict were "very close" to reaching an agreement to withdraw heavy weaponry from the line of contact, as specified by Minsk II. According to Ukrainian Defence Minister Stepan Poltorak, violence in the Donbas had reached its lowest level since the start of the war.

Whilst the ceasefire continued to hold into November, no final settlement to the conflict was agreed. The New York Times described this result as part of "a common arc of post-Soviet conflict, visible in the Georgian enclaves of South Ossetia and Abkhazia, Nagorno-Karabakh in Azerbaijan and in Transnistria", and said that separatist-controlled areas had become a "frozen zone", where people "live in ruins, amid a ruined ideology, in the ruins of the old empire." This state of affairs continued into 2016, with minor outbreaks of fighting along the line of contact, but no territorial changes An April report by the BBC labelled the conflict as "Europe's forgotten war".

A new ceasefire came into effect on 1 September 2016, described at the time by BBC correspondent Tom Burridge as "the first time there has been a true halt to fighting in 11 months", and in 2018 described by TASS as the most successful ceasefire over the course of the conflict, due to it lasting six weeks. Within days both sides accused each other of breaching the ceasefire, although they also stated that the ceasefire was widely observed. Nevertheless, on 6 September (2016), Ukrainian authorities reported the death of yet another soldier. On 24 December 2016, the tenth indefinite ceasefire since the start of the conflict came into effect; according to the OSCE Special Monitoring Mission in Ukraine, the Ukrainian government, and the separatists, the ceasefire was not observed.

2016 was the first full calendar year of the conflict in which Ukraine lost no territories to pro-Russian forces. In addition, both the Ukrainian Armed Forces (211 combat losses and 256 non-combat losses) and the local populace (13 in Ukrainian government-controlled areas) suffered significantly less casualties than in 2015.

=== January 2017 eruption of heavy fighting and failed ceasefires ===
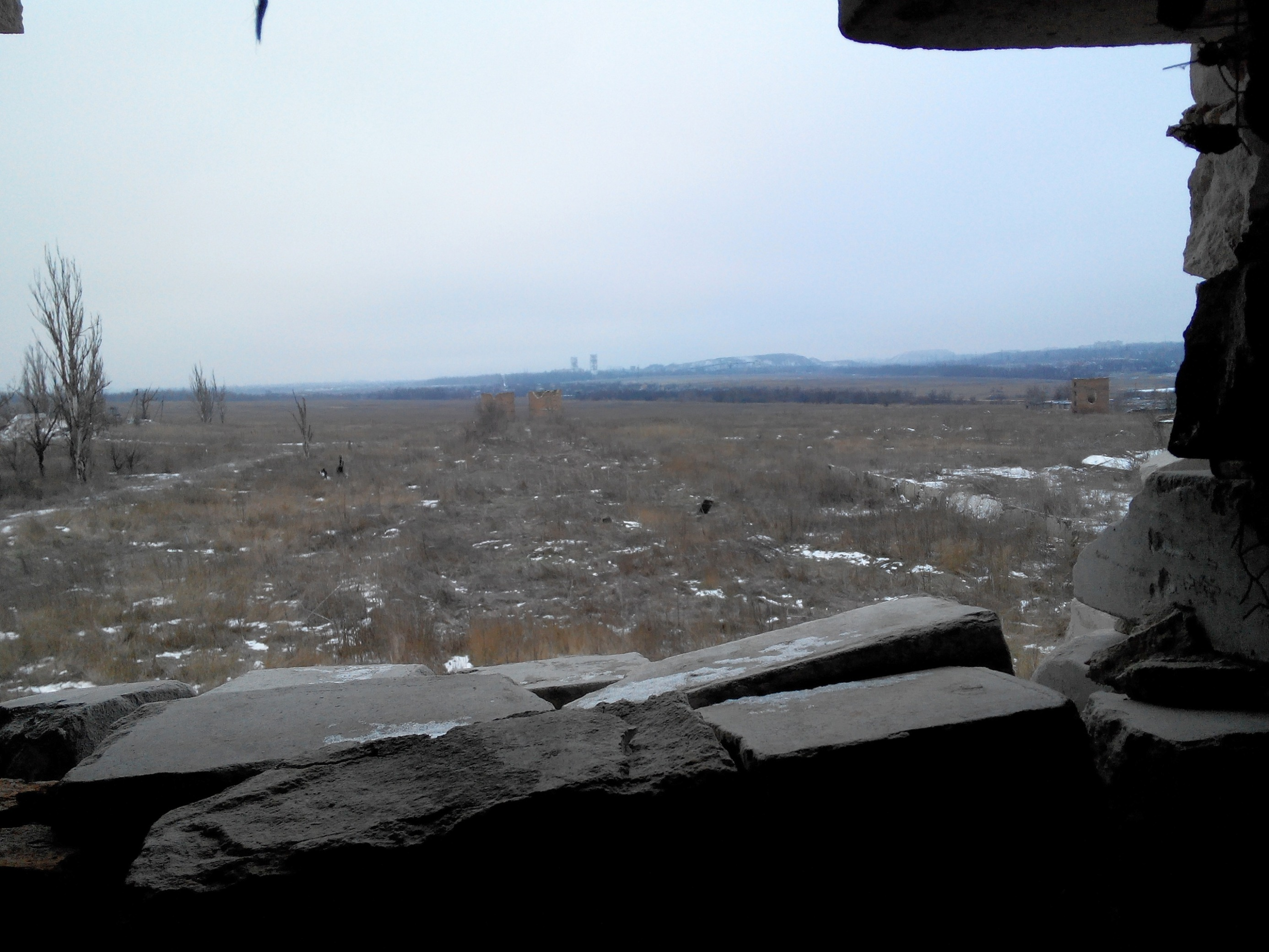
A view from a Ukrainian Armed Forces support point near Pisky, January 2017

There was another outbreak of heavy fighting starting on 29 January 2017, centred on the Ukrainian-controlled city of Avdiivka. In 2017, on average a Ukrainian soldier died every three days, with an estimated 40,000 separatist and 6,000 Russian troops in the region.

On 18 February 2017, Russian president Vladimir Putin signed a decree whereby the Russian authorities would recognise personal and vehicle-registration documents issued by the DPR and LPR. The presidential decree referred to "permanent residents of certain areas of Ukraine's Donetsk and Luhansk Oblasts", without any mention of the self-proclaimed People's Republics. Ukrainian authorities decried the decree as being directly contradictory to the Minsk II agreement and that it "legally recognised the quasi-state terrorist groups which cover Russia's occupation of part of Donbas". Secretary General of the Organisation for Security and Co-operation in Europe (OSCE) Lamberto Zannier stated on 19 February the decree "implies...recognition of those who issue the documents, of course" and that it would make it more difficult to hold a ceasefire.

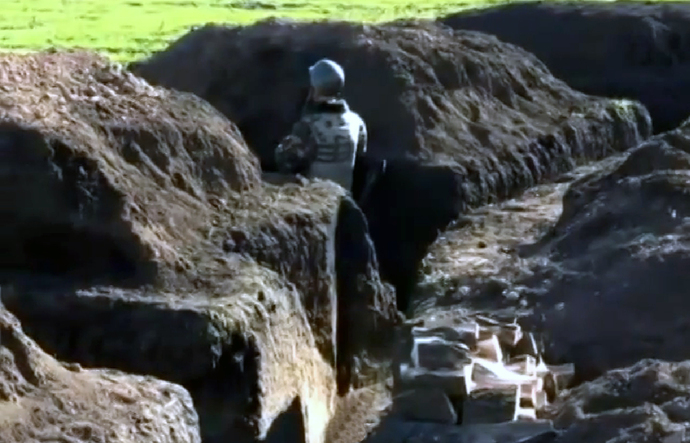
A Ukrainian soldier inside a trench. Extensive trench networks were built at the frontlines and the conflict turned into trench warfare

Russian foreign minister Sergey Lavrov, after meeting with his Ukrainian, German and French counterparts in Munich on 18 February, said that a ceasefire between Ukraine and the separatists had been agreed effective from 20 February 2017. But according to a Ukrainian Armed Forces spokesman on 20 February 2017 separatists attacks continued, although he did state there was a "significant reduction in military activity". On 21 February OSCE's Secretary General Zannier stated there were still a significant number of violations of the cease-fire and "no evidence of the withdrawal of weapons".

According to both parties to the conflict, the fourth truce attempt of 2017 collapsed within a few hours on 24 June 2017. A "back to school ceasefire" to begin on 25 August 2017 also immediately collapsed. A further "Christmas ceasefire" on 23 December 2017 was immediately broken.). On 27 December 2017, as part of the Minsk deal, a prisoner swap was conducted with 73 Ukrainian soldiers exchanged for over 200 separatists.

On 18 January 2018, the Ukrainian parliament passed a bill to regain control over separatist-held areas. The Russian government denounced the bill, calling it "preparations for a new war", and accused the Ukrainian government of violating the Minsk agreement. The law on the reintegration of Donbas labeled the republics of Donetsk and Luhansk as "temporarily-occupied territories", while Russia was labeled as an "aggressor". The legislation granted President Poroshenko "the right to use military force inside the country, without consent from the Ukrainian parliament", which would include the reclaiming of Donbas. The bill supports a ban on trade and a transport blockade of the east that has been in place since 2017. Under the legislation, the only separatist-issued documents that Ukraine would recognise are birth and death certificates.

A new ceasefire began on 5 March 2018, but was soon broken. The Trilateral Contact Group on Ukraine agreed on a "comprehensive, sustainable and unlimited ceasefire" that was to start on 30 March 2018. It collapsed on its first day.

Ukraine officially ended the "Anti-Terrorist Operation" (ATO), and replaced it with "Joint Forces Operation" (JFO) on 30 April 2018. Lieutenant-General Serhii Naiev, commander of the Joint Forces Operation, said the renaming was intended to signify that Ukraine was not fighting against indigenous "terrorists" or "separatist militants" in the Donbas, but against the Russian military. The same day, the United States confirmed that it had delivered Javelin anti-tank missiles to Ukraine. According to The Washington Post, the missiles will be kept away from the front line, and would be used only in the case of an all-out separatist assault.

On 28 June 2018, a "harvest ceasefire" was agreed set to start on 1 July. Both sides accused each other of violating it within hours. The 29 August 2018 ceasefire also failed. On 31 August 2018, DPR leader Alexander Zakharchenko was killed in an explosion at a restaurant.

On 28 December 2018, Ukraine's Chief of the General Staff, Viktor Muzhenko, said that almost the entire "grey zone" between the warring sides had been liberated from Russian-led forces without breaching the Minsk peace agreements. The same day, a new (and the 22nd attempt at an) ceasefire starting midnight 29 December was agreed. Both sides accused each other of violating the ceasefire within hours.

A new ceasefire was agreed to start on 8 March 2019. Although Ukraine claimed that "Russian proxies" violated it on the same day, fighting died down, with the Ukrainian side stating that the ceasefire was fully observed from 10 March 2019.

In June 2019, Russia began distributing Russian passports to Ukrainians living in the regions of Donbas. This was considered by the Ukrainian government as a step towards annexation of the region.

=== October 2019 Steinmeier formula agreement and July 2020 ceasefire ===
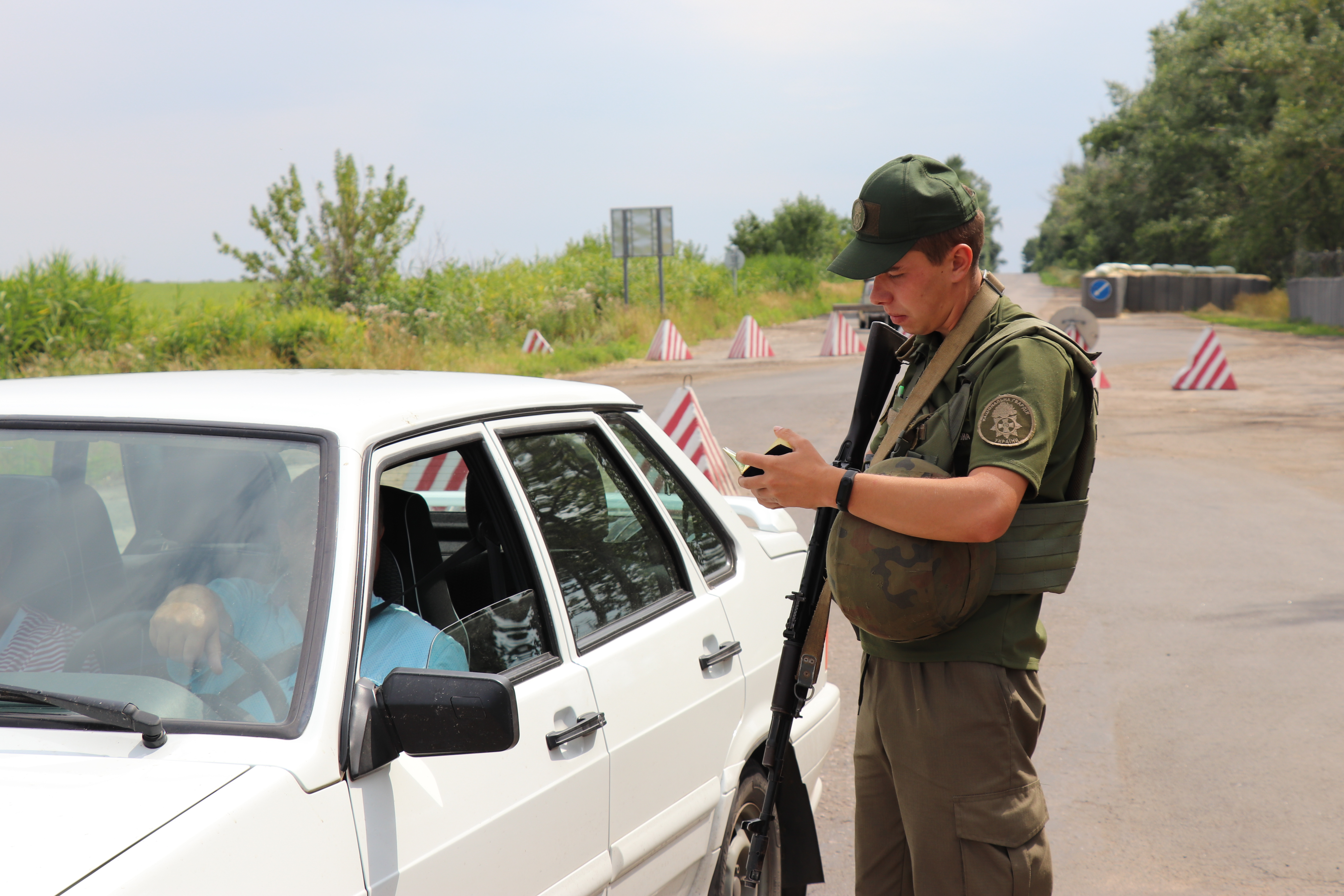
Ukrainian National Guard soldier in a security checkpoint near the JFO zone, 2019.

A March 2019 survey of public opinion by the Centre for East European and International Studies in DPR/LPR-controlled Donbas found that 55% favoured reintegration with Ukraine, and 45% preferred integration into Russia. 58% of all respondents supported special status either within Ukraine or Russia for the region.

Ukraine, Russia, the DPR, LPR, and the OSCE signed an agreement on 1 October 2019 to try to end the conflict. Called the "Steinmeier formula", after its proposer, German President Frank-Walter Steinmeier, it was a simplified version of the Minsk agreements. The plan called for holding elections, under Ukrainian law, in the rebel-held territory. If the OSCE deemed the elections free and fair, the territory would be re-integrated into Ukraine with "special status". Russia demanded the agreement's signing before any continuation of the "Normandy format" peace talks. In line with the agreement, Ukrainian and pro-Russian forces agreed to pull back from three parts of the frontline: at Stanytsia Luhanska, Zolote and Petrivske.

Ukraine's new president Volodomyr Zelenskyy faced criticism from Ukrainian media, civil society, war veterans and nationalists. Critics argued that the Steinmeier plan would legalize the occupation of the Donbas and leave it as "a deadly Trojan horse under Russian control". The main issues were holding elections in Donbas while it and the border were still controlled by Russian forces. In these conditions, it was argued that elections were unlikely to be free and fair, and it would be impossible to ensure Russia kept its end of the agreement. The separatists had long driven most pro-Ukrainian residents out of the region to ensure a pro-Russia majority.

The leaders of the Donbas separatists, Denis Pushilin and Leonid Pasechnik, stated: "It will be we who decide ... how our people's militia will be defending our citizens, and how we will be integrated into Russia. ... Kyiv authorities will not get any sort of control over the border".

Zelenskyy responded that he would not allow elections "at gunpoint". He said there must first be a ceasefire, return of prisoners, withdrawal of Russian forces, Ukrainian control of its border, participation of Ukrainian parties and candidates, and the right of all those who fled the conflict to return to vote.

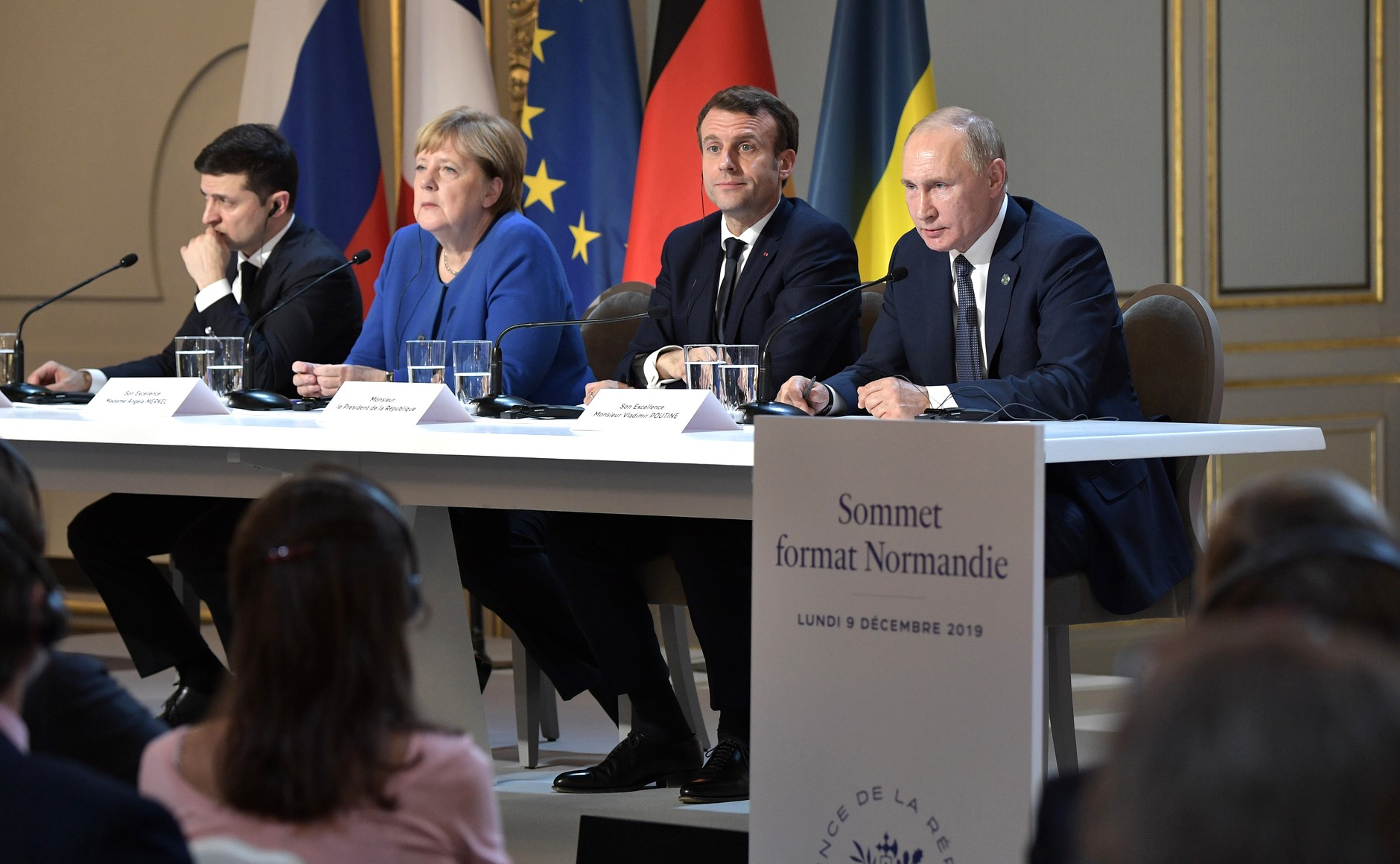
Zelenskyy, Merkel, Macron and Putin at a joint press conference following the Normandy format talks in Paris, December 2019

Putin, Zelenskyy, French president Emmanuel Macron and German chancellor Angela Merkel met in Paris on 9 December 2019 in a resumption of the Normandy format talks. The two sides agreed to exchange all remaining prisoners by the end of 2019, work toward elections in the Donbas, and schedule further talks. However, Putin insisted that control of the border should only be dealt with after the elections. The Russian side continued to deny that its military was operating in the Donbas, instead calling them "Russian volunteers".

The COVID-19 pandemic worsened living conditions in the conflict zone. Quarantine measures imposed by Ukraine, the DPR and LPR prevented those in the occupied territories from crossing the line of contact, cutting off access to services. Fighting increased in March 2020, with nineteen civilians killed, more than in the previous five months combined. While some crossings opened to small numbers of people in June, the DPR introduced new restrictions, ostensibly to prevent the spread of coronavirus, which made it nigh impossible for most to cross the line of contact. In contrast, the Russian border completely reopened.

The 29th attempt at a "full and comprehensive" ceasefire came into effect on 27 July 2020. During his 24 August 2020 Ukrainian Independence Day speech, President Zelenskyy announced the ceasefire had held, leading to 29 days without combat losses. Zelenskyy also admitted, however, that despite the prisoner exchange and de-mining operations, the peace process did not move as fast as he had hoped. On 6 September 2020, the Ukrainian Armed Forces reported its first combat death since the July ceasefire. President Zelenskyy stated on 7 November 2020 that since the July ceasefire was established, deaths of Ukrainian soldiers in combat had decreased tenfold, and the number of attacks on soldiers decreased by five-and-a-half-fold. From 27 July 2020 until 7 November 2020, only three Ukrainian soldiers were killed.

=== 2021–2022 escalation ===
During 2021, there was an uptick in ceasefire breaches and attacks by Russian-backed forces in the Donbas. OSCE observers reported more than 90,000 ceasefire violations throughout 2021; the vast majority in Russian-controlled territory.

According to Ukrainian authorities, 25 Ukrainian soldiers were killed in the first three months of 2021, compared to 50 killed in all of 2020. According to the Ombudsman of the DPR, 85 of its fighters and 30 civilians were killed in January–October 2021.

In late March–early April 2021, the Russian military moved large quantities of arms and equipment into occupied Crimea and the Voronezh and Rostov oblasts of Russia. A Janes intelligence specialist called it the largest unannounced military movement since the 2014 invasion of Crimea. On 10 April, Russian state news agency TASS reported that fifty of its battalion tactical groups consisting of 15,000 soldiers were massed for drills in the Southern Military District, which includes occupied Crimea and also borders the Donbas conflict zone. The head of the Ukrainian border guard estimated that 85,000 Russian soldiers were already in Crimea or within 40 kilometres (25 mi) of the Ukrainian border.

A Russian government spokesman said that the Russian military movements posed no threat, but Russian official Dmitry Kozak warned that Russian forces could act to "defend" Russian citizens in Ukraine, and any escalation of the Donbas conflict would mean "the beginning of the end of Ukraine" – "not a shot in the leg, but in the face". By this time, some half a million people in the self-proclaimed Donetsk People's Republic and Luhansk People's Republic had been issued Russian passports since fighting broke out in 2014. Russia refused to participate when Ukraine requested a Vienna Document meeting with France, Germany, and the OSCE.

In April 2021, Ukraine performed the first operational rollout of Turkish-made Bayraktar TB2 military drones in the region. In November, a Bayraktar drone on the Ukrainian-government-controlled side of the line of contact was used to destroy a separatist artillery piece on the other side, which was conducting a strike that levelled homes and wounded and killed Ukrainian soldiers. The use of Ukrainian and Russian drones was criticised by France and Germany, while the United States pointed out that the Russia-led side has repeatedly violated agreements by the use of drones and howitzer artillery.

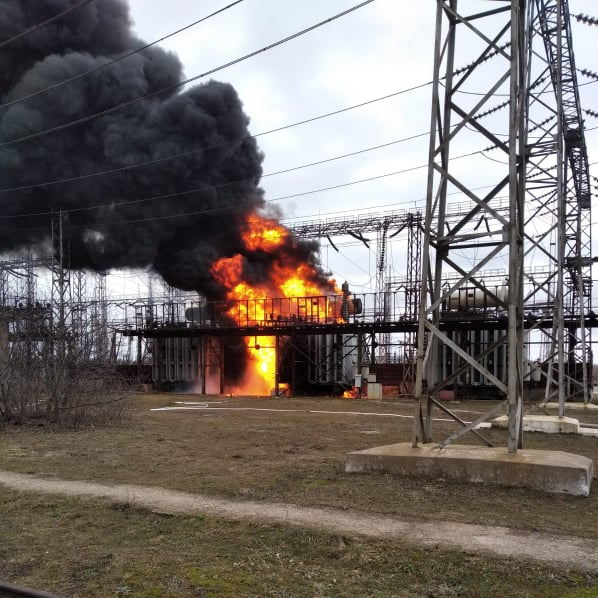
Luhansk power station after being shelled by Russian-backed forces in the Donbas, 22 February 2022

In December 2021, Ukrainian authorities said that Russia was sending snipers and tanks to the region. On 21 January 2022, the Chairman of the Russian State Duma, Vyacheslav Volodin, called for a discussion in the parliamentary body to recognise the independence of the Donbas region and its separation from Ukraine. By February 2022, fighting had escalated. There was a sharp increase in artillery shelling by the Russian-led militants in Donbas, which was considered by Ukraine and its allies to be an attempt to provoke the Ukrainian army or create a pretext for invasion. For example, the Ukrainian military reported enduring 60 attacks along the line of contact on 17 February alone, including "one shell that struck a kindergarten near the front line, injuring three staff".

Amid increased tensions between Russia and Ukraine in February 2022, Russian president Vladimir Putin announced on 21 February that Russia would recognise the independence of the Donetsk and Luhansk people's republics. This announcement was followed by an order to deploy Russian troops to the Donbas as "peacekeepers". A number of western countries, including the US, UK, and the EU, announced that they would impose new sanctions on Russian-connected organisations in response.

=== 2022 full-scale Russian invasion of Ukraine ===
On 24 February 2022, Russia launched a new, full-scale invasion of Ukraine. The DPR and LPR joined the offensive; the separatists stated that an operation to capture the entirety of Donetsk Oblast and Luhansk Oblast had begun. By 25 March 2022, Russian forces claimed control over 93 percent of Luhansk oblast and 54 percent of Donetsk oblast. Having encountered heavy resistance to its operations in other parts of Ukraine, Russia announced on the same day that it would shift its focus to the complete "liberation" of the Donbas, and launched a campaign that would last through much of mid-2022.

== Combatants ==
=== List of combatants ===
Diverse forces of both foreign and domestic origin participated in the war in the Donbas.

=== Russian involvement ===
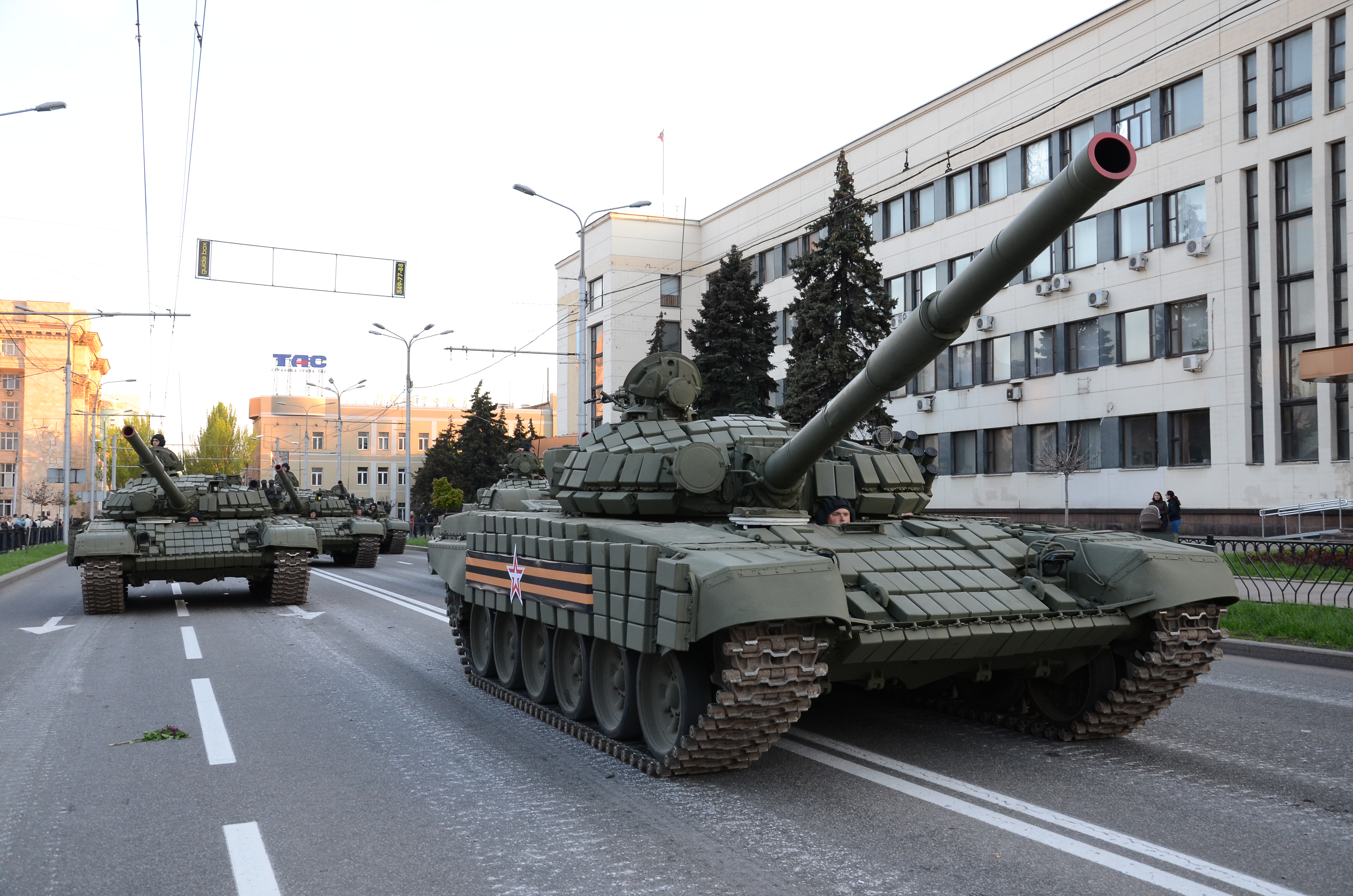
Several Russian-made T-72B tanks of the Donetsk People's Republic, during a military parade in 2015

Russian involvement in the Donbas war took a variety of forms. The International Criminal Court judged that the war was both a national and international armed conflict involving Ukraine and Russia, and the European Court of Human Rights judged that Russia controlled the rebels from 2014 onward. Only Russian intervention in August 2014 prevented a Ukrainian victory in the conflict.

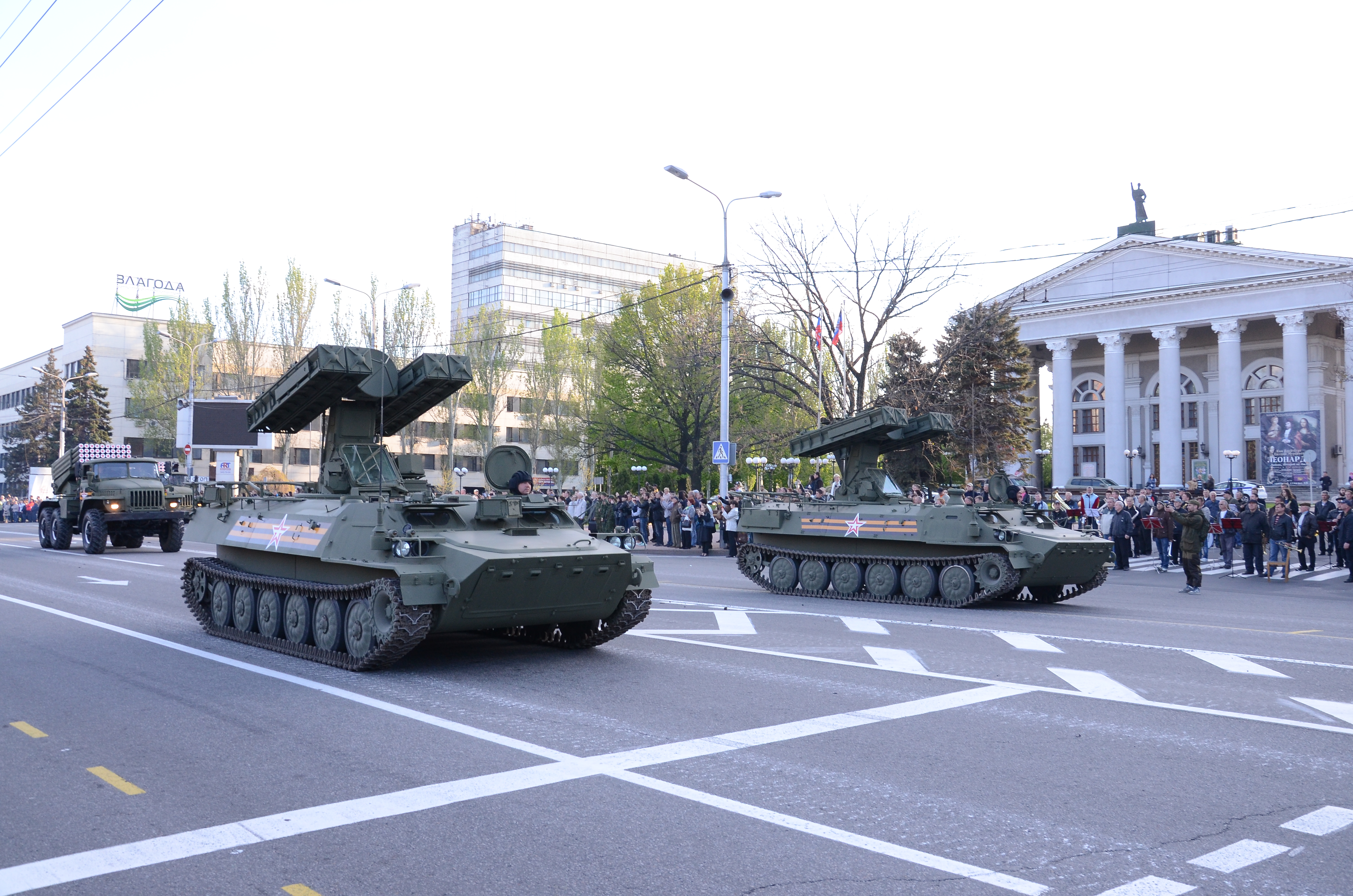
Strela-10 ground-to-air missile vehicles of the Donetsk People's Republic, 2015

Before the war, separatism in the Donbas had limited support, and there was little evidence of support for an armed uprising. The initial protests across southern and eastern Ukraine were largely native expressions of discontent with the new Ukrainian government and the emergence of the separatists in Donetsk and Luhansk began as a small fringe group of the protesters, independent of Russian control. Russia took advantage of this, however, to launch a co-ordinated political and military campaign against Ukraine, as part of the broader Russo-Ukrainian War, including several information campaigns and sporadic cyber attacks that started before Yanukovych's ouster in February.

Russian president Vladimir Putin gave legitimacy to the separatist movement when he described the Donbas as part of the historical "New Russia" (Novorossiya), and said he did not understand how the region ever became part of Ukraine. When Ukrainian authorities cracked down on the pro-Russian protests and arrested local separatist leaders in early March, these were replaced by people with ties to the Russian security services and interests in Russian businesses, probably by order of Russian intelligence. By April 2014, Russians citizens had taken control of the separatist movement, and were supported by volunteers and materiel from Russia, including Chechen and Cossack militants. According to DPR insurgent commander Igor Girkin, without this support in April, the movement would have fizzled out.

As conflict between the separatists and the Ukrainian government escalated in May 2014, Russia began to employ a "hybrid approach", deploying a combination of disinformation tactics, irregular fighters, regular Russian troops, and conventional military support to support the separatists and destabilise the Donbas. The First Battle of Donetsk Airport in late May 2014 was the first battle between the separatists and the Ukrainian government that involved large amounts of Russian volunteers. According to the Ukrainian government, at the height of the conflict in the summer of 2014, Russian paramilitaries were reported to make up between 15% and 80% of the combatants. According to the RAND Corporation, "Russia has armed, trained, and led the separatist forces. But even by Kyiv's own estimates, the vast majority of rebel forces consist of locals—not soldiers of the regular Russian military".

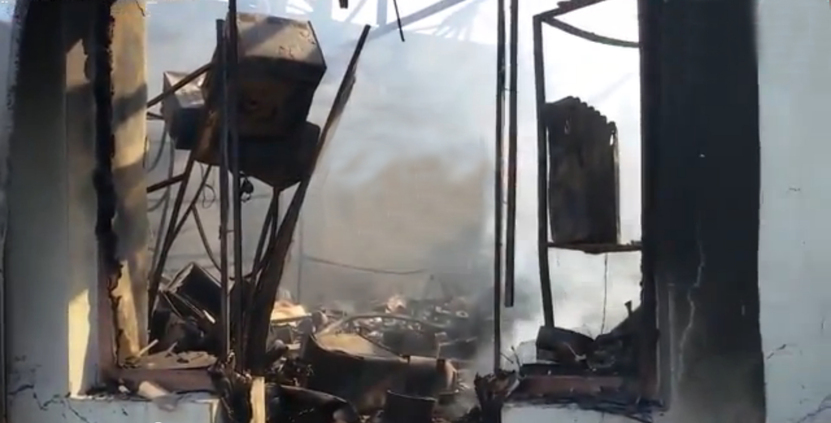
Damaged building on 25 July 2014

By August 2014, the Ukrainians had re-taken most of the territory controlled by pro-Russian forces. Igor Girkin urged Russian military intervention, and said that the combat inexperience of his irregular forces, along with recruitment difficulties amongst the local population, had caused the setbacks. He addressed Russian president Vladimir Putin, saying: "Losing this war on the territory that President Vladimir Putin personally named New Russia would threaten the Kremlin's power and, personally, the power of the president". Russia then covertly launched a conventional invasion. The first sign of this was the 25 August 2014 capture of a group of Russian paratroopers on active service in Ukrainian territory by the Ukrainian security service (SBU). The SBU released photographs of them, and their names. The Russian Defence Ministry said these soldiers had crossed the border "by accident". According to Nikolai Mitrokhin's estimates, by mid-August 2014 during the Battle of Ilovaisk, there were between 20,000 and 25,000 troops fighting in the Donbas on the separatist side, and only 40% to 45% were "locals".

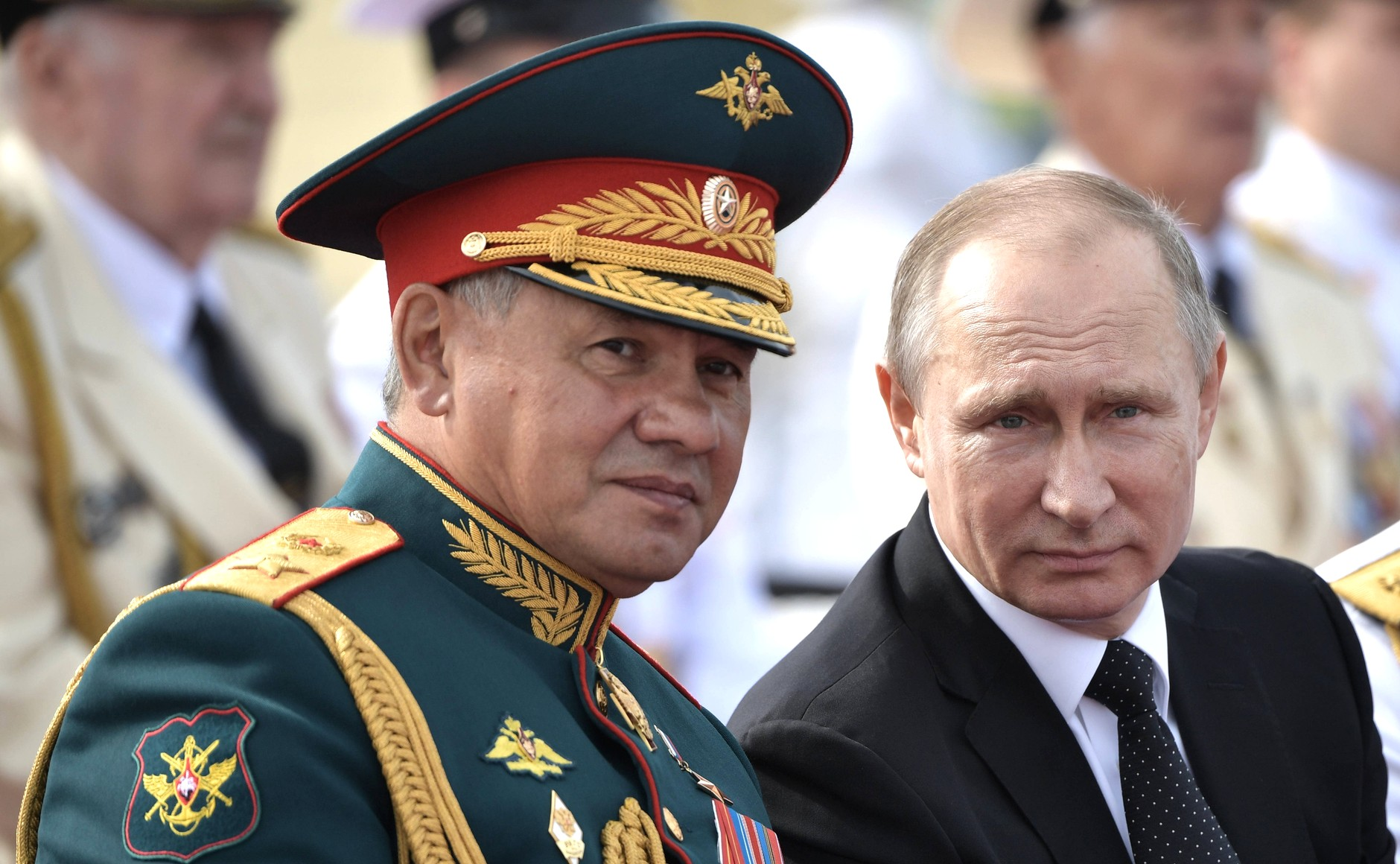
Vladimir Putin (right) and his long-time confidant Defence Minister Sergei Shoigu.

Beginning on 27 August 2014, vast amounts of military equipment and troops crossed the border from Russia into southern Donetsk Oblast. Western officials described this as a "stealth invasion". Ukrainian President Poroshenko declared that Russian forces had invaded. NATO commander Brig. Gen. Nico Tak estimated on 28 August that "well over" 1,000 Russian soldiers were operating in the Donbas. Ukrainian forces were also struck by cross-border shelling from Russia from mid-July onward. Russian officials denied any role, denials viewed as implausible.

In the run up to the August 2014 invasion, Russia had decided to replace many of the hardline leaders of the separatist movement, including Igor Girkin and DPR prime minister Alexander Borodai. These replacements, taken together with the subsequent invasion, represented another turning point in the conflict. It abandoned the Russian citizen-led separatist project, which it had been unable to fully control, and replaced it with the idea of special status for Donbas within Ukraine, and a more obedient DPR/LPR command. This represented a Russian attempt to "indigenise" the conflict, using the insignificant local pro-Russian political activists as cover for the advancement of Russian interests in Ukraine.

Russian forces and equipment participated in the Second Battle of Donetsk Airport and the Battle of Debaltseve. A report released by the Royal United Services Institute in March 2015 said that "the presence of large numbers of Russian troops on Ukrainian sovereign territory" had become a "permanent feature" of the war since the August 2014 invasion.

The terms of the Minsk agreement were highly favourable to Russia, in that they required Ukraine to grant "special status" to the separatist-held areas, and reintegrate them into Ukraine, similar to the federalisation espoused by pro-Russian protesters in early 2014. This would establish a Russian "strategic hook" within Ukraine that could be used to prevent future integration of that country with the European Union or NATO.

Former DPR prime minister Borodai said that about 50,000 Russian citizens had fought for the separatists by mid-2015, not counting regular Russian troops that had invaded. In a press conference on 17 December 2015, Russian president Vladimir Putin acknowledged for the first time that there had been a Russian military presence in the Donbas, though saying this did not mean there were "Russian troops" there.

By September 2015, the separatist units, at the battalion level and up, were acting under direct command of officers of the Russian Armed Forces. Ukraine, the United States, and some analysts consider them to be under the command of Russia's 8th Combined Arms Army, which was re-formed within the Russian Southern Military District for this specific task in 2017.

By February 2018, the number of separatist forces were estimated at 31,000, of which 80% (25,000) were estimated to be Donbas residents, 15% (≈5,000) military contractors from Russia and other countries, and 3% (900–1,000) regular Russian soldiers.

On 24 April 2019, Putin issued an executive order fast-tracking the process for obtaining Russian citizenship for residents of the territories held by the DPR and the LPR. This "passportisation" is similar to what Russia did in Transnistria, Abkhazia, and South Ossetia.

Russia recognised the DPR and LPR as independent states on 21 February 2022, and subsequently ordered Russian troops into the Donbas conflict zone as "peacekeepers". This was followed by the launch of a full-scale invasion of Ukraine.

In April 2023, Russia granted combat veteran status to separatist militants who had fought in the Donbas war since 2014.

=== Military aid to Ukraine ===
In December 2017, the United States provided Ukraine with lethal aid for the first time, in the form of Javelin antitank missiles. Initially, these were to be kept away from the front, but after a second delivery of similar weapon systems they were cleared for use anywhere. In September 2021, Kyiv commanded military forces drill in a common exercise with US and NATO partners. The use of Javelins on the front line was reported in November 2021.

== Casualties ==
The first battle-related casualty during the war occurred on 13 April when armed men under the command of Igor Girkin ambushed Ukrainian special forces and killed one SBU officer. According to the Uppsala Conflict Data Program, this casualty marked the dividing line between peace and armed conflict. The threshold to an armed conflict was crossed in the beginning of May when more than 25 people were killed since the beginning of the conflict. By mid-July to early August more than one thousand people died, the minimum threshold for classifying it as a war.

The estimated number of fatalities in the Donbas war was 14,200–14,400 by the end of December 2021, including non-combat military deaths. According to the Office of the United Nations High Commissioner for Human Rights, 6,500 were pro-Russian separatist forces, 4,400 were Ukrainian forces, and 3,404 were civilians. The vast majority of deaths were in the first two years of the war (2014 and 2015).

=== Civilians ===
According to the United Nations, 3,404 civilians were killed in the war and more than 7,000 were injured. The vast majority of civilian deaths were in the first two years of the war, while 365 civilians were killed in the six years from 2016 to 2021. In the year before Russia's full-scale invasion, 25 civilians were killed, over half of them from mines and unexploded ordnance.

Of the civilian deaths, at least 312 were foreigners: 298 passengers and crew of Malaysia Airlines Flight 17, 11 Russian journalists, an Italian journalist, a Lithuanian diplomat, and one Russian civilian killed in cross-border shelling.

Of the 3,106 conflict-related civilian deaths, not counting the fatalities from the shoot down of Malaysia Airlines Flight 17: 1,852 were men, 1,072 women, 102 boys, 50 girls and 30 adults whose sex is unknown.

=== Ukrainian forces ===
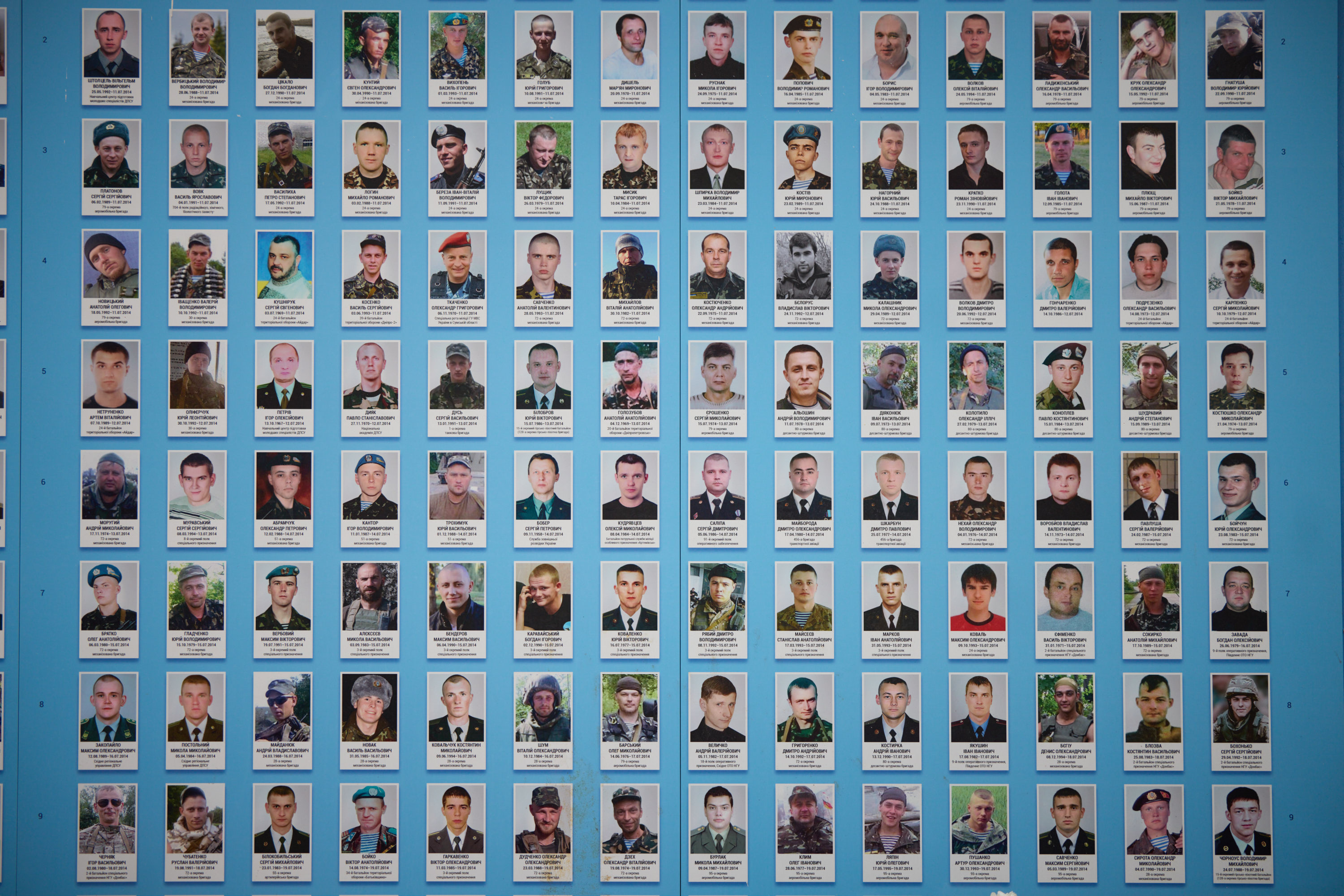
A mural of Ukrainian soldiers who died during the war in Donbas in 2014

Ukraine reported that 4,535 of its servicemen had been killed by late February 2022, including 253 foreign-born Ukrainian citizens or foreigners. (Note: The number of Ukrainian soldiers killed includes the deaths of two servicemen during the Annexation of Crimea by the Russian Federation.) Another 70 Ukrainian soldiers were missing.

As of 25 October 2026, UALosses has confirmed the names of 6,906 Ukrainian soldiers who were killed during the War in Donbas. (Note: Despite the War in Donbas losses banner on the website reading 2014-2021, sorting by "date of death" on the website will show the names of soldiers who were killed up to 23 February 2022)

=== Russian and separatist forces ===
The UN estimated 6,500 separatist militants were killed by the end of December 2021.

Ukraine claimed 7,577 separatists had been killed and 12,000 were missing by early 2015. They claimed an additional 103 Russian servicemen were killed between January and April 2016.

In late August 2015, according to a reported leak by a Russian news site, Business Life (Delovaya Zhizn), 2,000 Russian soldiers had been killed in Ukraine by February 2015. The US Department of State reported that 400–500 Russian soldiers had been killed by March 2015.

== Consequences and humanitarian concerns ==
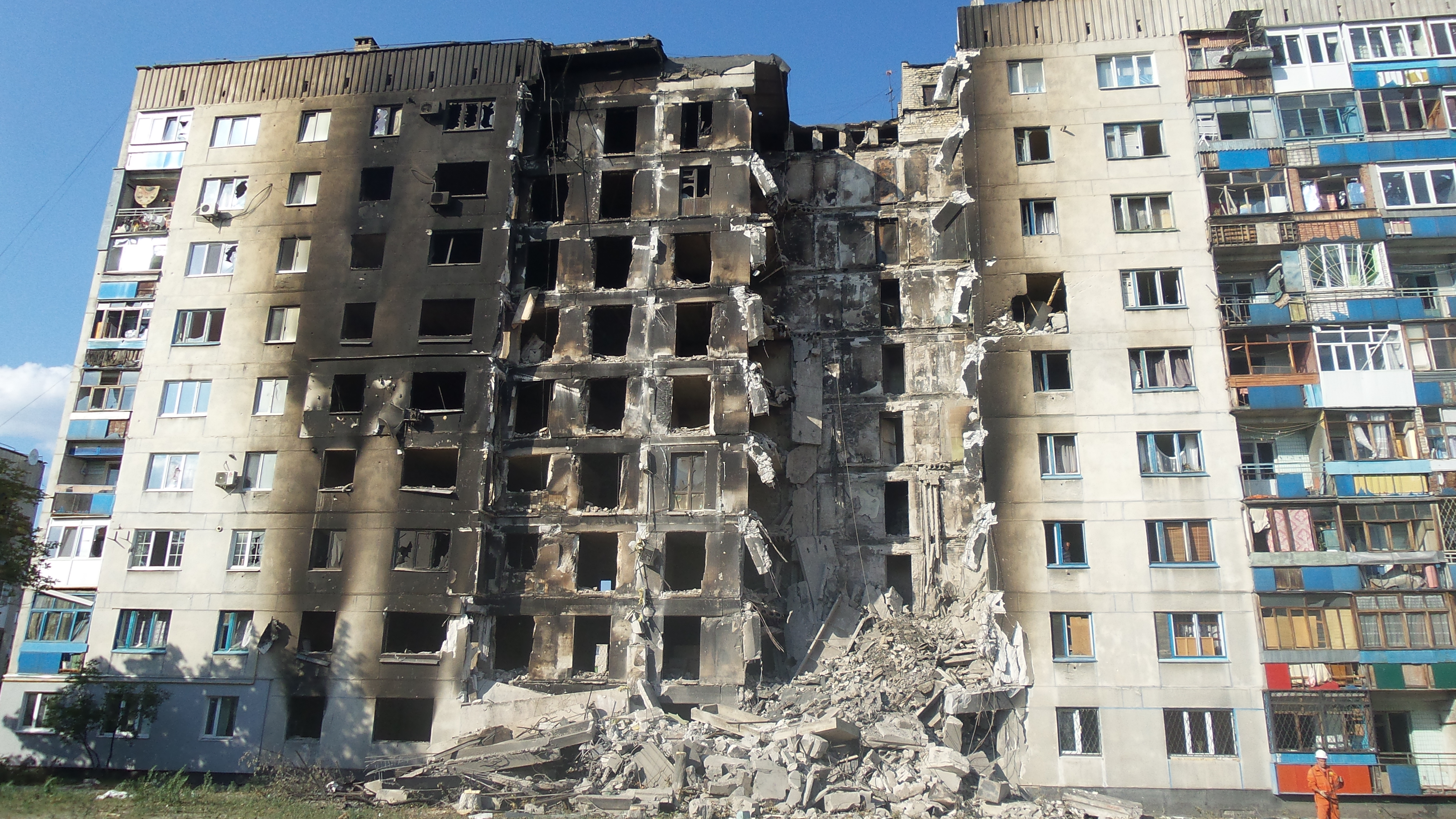
A damaged building in Lysychansk, 4 August 2014

The United Nations observed in May 2014 an "alarming deterioration" in human rights in territory held by insurgents affiliated with the Donetsk People's Republic and Luhansk People's Republic. The UN reported growing lawlessness in the region, documenting cases of targeted killings, torture, and abduction, primarily carried out by the forces of the Donetsk People's Republic. The UN also reported threats against, attacks on, and abductions of journalists and international observers, as well as beatings and attacks on supporters of Ukrainian unity. Russia criticised these reports, and said that they were "politically motivated".

A report by Human Rights Watch in 2014 said "Anti-Kyiv forces in eastern Ukraine are abducting, attacking, and harassing people they suspect of supporting the Ukrainian government or consider undesirable...anti-Kyiv insurgents are using beatings and kidnappings to send the message that anyone who doesn't support them had better shut up or leave". There were also multiple instances of beatings, abductions, and possible executions of local residents by Ukrainian troops, such as Oleh Lyashko's militia and the Aidar territorial defence battalion. In August, Igor Druz, a senior advisor to pro-Russian insurgent commander Igor Girkin, said that "On several occasions, in a state of emergency, we have carried out executions by shooting to prevent chaos. As a result, our troops, the ones who have pulled out of Sloviansk, are highly disciplined".

After the first Minsk Protocol ceasefire, warlords took control of districts on the separatist side.

A report by the United Nations Office of the High Commissioner for Human Rights (OHCHR) released on 28 July 2014 said that at least 750 million US dollars' worth of damage has been done to property and infrastructure in Donetsk and Luhansk oblasts. Human Rights Watch said that Ukrainian government forces, pro-government paramilitaries, and the insurgents had used unguided Grad rockets in attacks on civilian areas, stating that "The use of indiscriminate rockets in populated areas violates international humanitarian law, or the laws of war, and may amount to war crimes". The New York Times reported that the high rate of civilian deaths had "left the population in eastern Ukraine embittered toward Ukraine's pro-Western government", and that this sentiment helped to "spur recruitment" for the insurgents.

A March 2016 report by the OHCHR said that people that lived in separatist-controlled areas were experiencing "complete absence of rule of law, reports of arbitrary detention, torture and incommunicado detention, and no access to real redress mechanisms".

As consequence of the conflict, large swathes of the Donbas region, on both sides of the "contact line", have become contaminated with landmines and other explosive remnants of war (ERW). According to the UN Humanitarian Coordinator in Ukraine, in 2020 Ukraine was one of the most mine-affected countries in the world, with nearly 1,200 mine/ERW casualties since the beginning of the conflict in 2014. A report by UNICEF released in December 2019 said that 172 children had been injured or killed due to landmines and other explosives, over 750 educational facilities had been damaged or destroyed, and 430,000 children lived with psychological traumas associated with war.

On 14 March 2025, Yan Petrovsky, a member of the Russian far-right mercenary group Rusich, was sentenced to life in prison by a Finnish court for committing war crimes in eastern Ukraine in 2014.

=== Displaced population ===
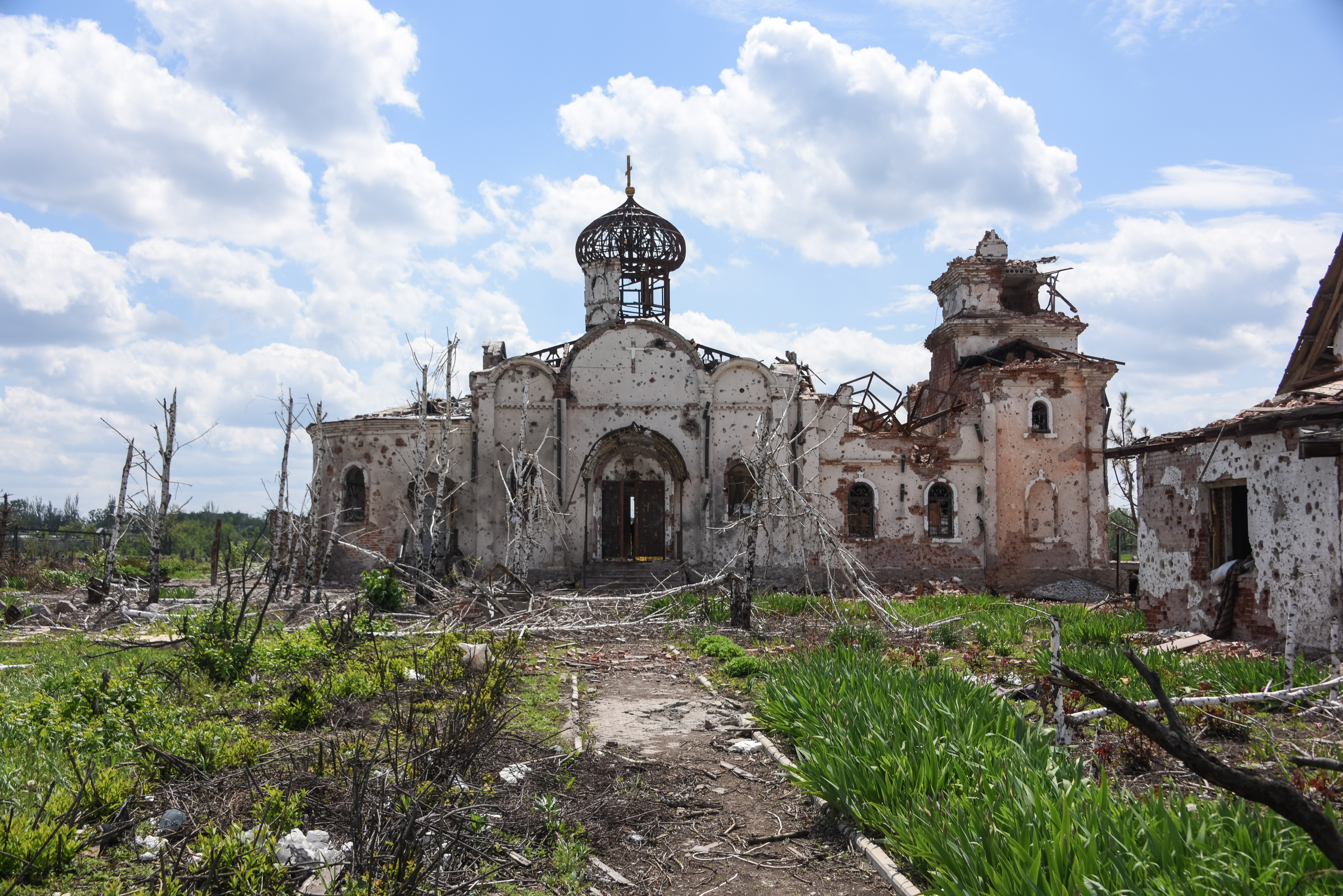
The ruins of the Iversky Monastery near Donetsk airport, May 2015

By April 2015, the war had caused at least 1.3 million people to become internally displaced within Ukraine. In addition, more than 800,000 Ukrainians had sought asylum, residence permits, or other forms of legal stay in neighbouring countries, with over 659,143 in Russia, 81,100 in Belarus, and thousands more elsewhere.

According to another report by the UN OHCHR, over three million people continued to live in the Donbas conflict zone as of March 2016. This was said to include 2.7 million who lived in DPR and LPR-controlled areas, and 200,000 in Ukrainian-controlled areas adjacent to the line of contact.

By November 2017, the UN had identified 1.8 million internally displaced people in Ukraine because of the war, another 427,240 who had sought asylum or refugee status in the Russian Federation, plus 11,230 refugees in Italy, 10,495 in Germany, 8,380 in Spain, and 4,595 in Poland.

In 2011, Ukrainian Luhansk and Donetsk oblasts had a combined population of 6.1 million. As a result of Russian military aggression in 2014, about 2 million had to leave the region as internally displaced or as refugees. After a full-scale Russian invasion in 2022, another approximately 3 million either fled or were killed, in total resulting in an 80% decrease of the Donbas population. According to political scientist Taras Kuzio, this amounts to "destruction, depopulation, and genocide".

== Reactions ==
=== Ukrainian public opinion ===
A national survey held in March–April 2014 by the Kyiv International Institute of Sociology found that 31% of respondents in the Donbas wanted the region to separate from Ukraine, while 58% wanted autonomy within Ukraine. A September 2014 International Republican Institute poll of the Ukrainian public (excluding those in Russian-annexed Crimea) had 89% of respondents opposing Russian military intervention in Ukraine. As broken down by region, 78% of those polled from Eastern Ukraine (including Dnipropetrovsk Oblast) opposed Russian intervention, along with 89% in Southern Ukraine, 93% in Central Ukraine, and 99% in Western Ukraine. As broken down by native language, 79% of Russian speakers and 95% of Ukrainian speakers opposed Russian intervention. 80% of those polled said that Ukraine should remain a unitary country. Meanwhile, 56% of those polled said that Russia should pay for the reconstruction of the Donbas, whereas 32% said Donetsk and Luhansk oblasts should pay. 59% of those polled said that they supported the Ukrainian military operation in the Donbas, whereas 33% said that they opposed it. 73% of respondents said that the war in the Donbas was one of the three most important issues facing Ukraine.

A poll conducted by the same institute in 2017 showed that 80% of Ukrainians nationally and 73% of people from the Ukrainian-controlled areas of Donbas believed the separatist republics should remain as part of Ukraine. Around 60% of the people polled did not believe Ukraine was doing enough to regain the lost territories because of the Minsk agreements.

A joint poll done by Levada and the Kyiv International Institute of Sociology from September to October 2020 found that in the breakaway regions controlled by the DPR/LPR, over half of the respondents wanted to join Russia (either with or without some autonomous status) while less than one-tenth wanted independence and 12% wanted reintegration into Ukraine. It contrasted with respondents in Ukrainian-controlled Donbas, where a vast majority felt the separatist regions should be returned to Ukraine. According to results from Levada in January 2022, roughly 70% of those in the breakaway regions said their territories should become part of Russia.

By 2021, 72% of Ukrainians viewed Russia as an enemy state. In 2020, 61% of Ukrainians viewed the conflict as a "Russian aggression with the use of local militants," and only 21% argued that it was a civil war. In the East, 42.2% of respondents considered the war to be an "internal conflict." After the full-scale invasion, only 6% of respondents in the East and 1% in all other regions viewed the war as an attempt to protect the Russian-speaking population.

=== Russia ===
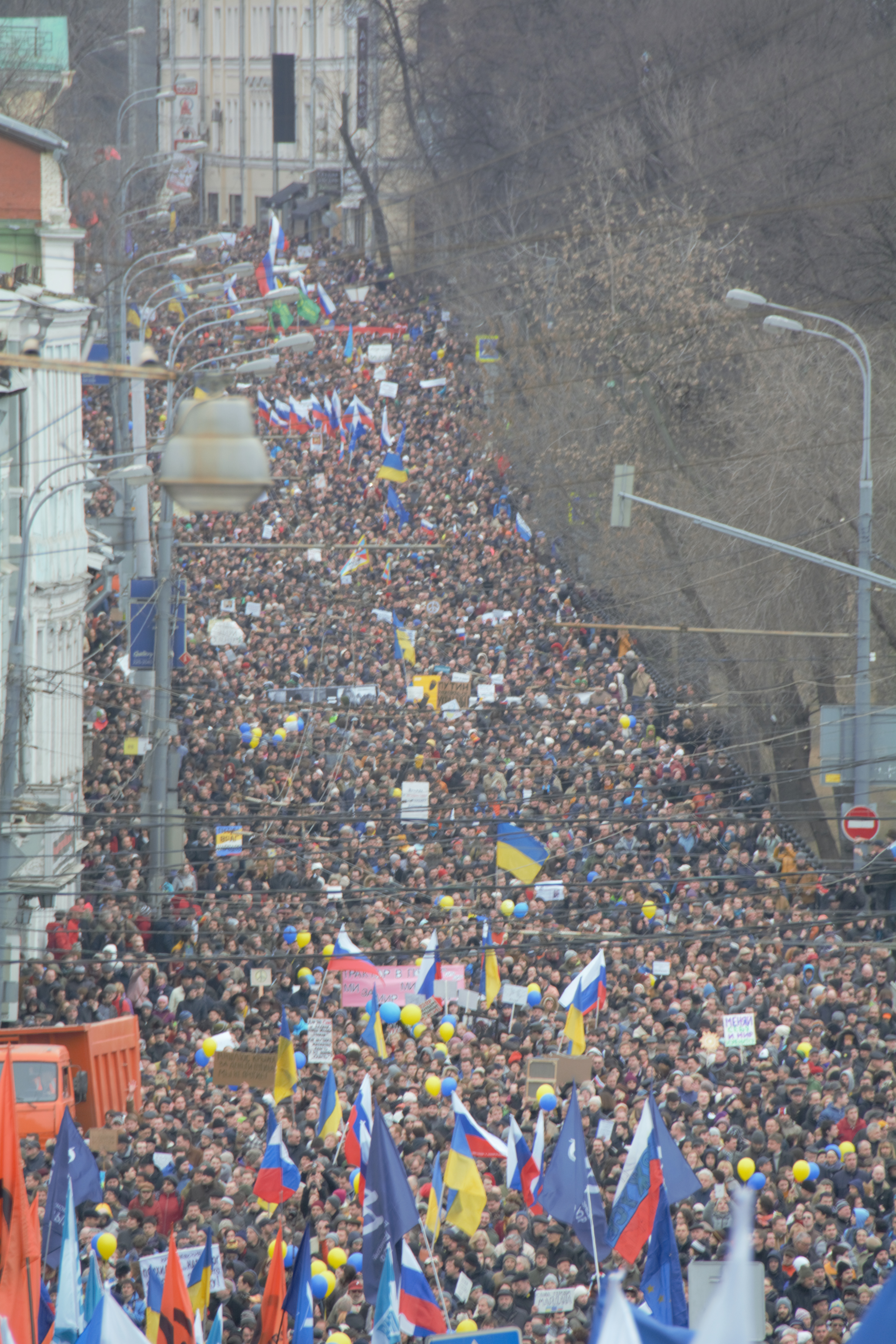
March for the peace and freedom in Moscow was one of the anti-war protests in Russia.

A series of anti-war demonstrations took place in Russia in 2014. Protesters held two protest rallies on 2 and 15 March 2014. The latter, known as the March of Peace (Russian: Марш Мира, Marsh Mira), took place in Moscow a day before the Crimean referendum. The protests were the largest in Russia since the 2011–13 Russian protests.

Boris Nemtsov said that the public opinion was being manipulated by means of agitation and propaganda, with those who opposed the government's policy denied access to the media.

=== International reactions ===
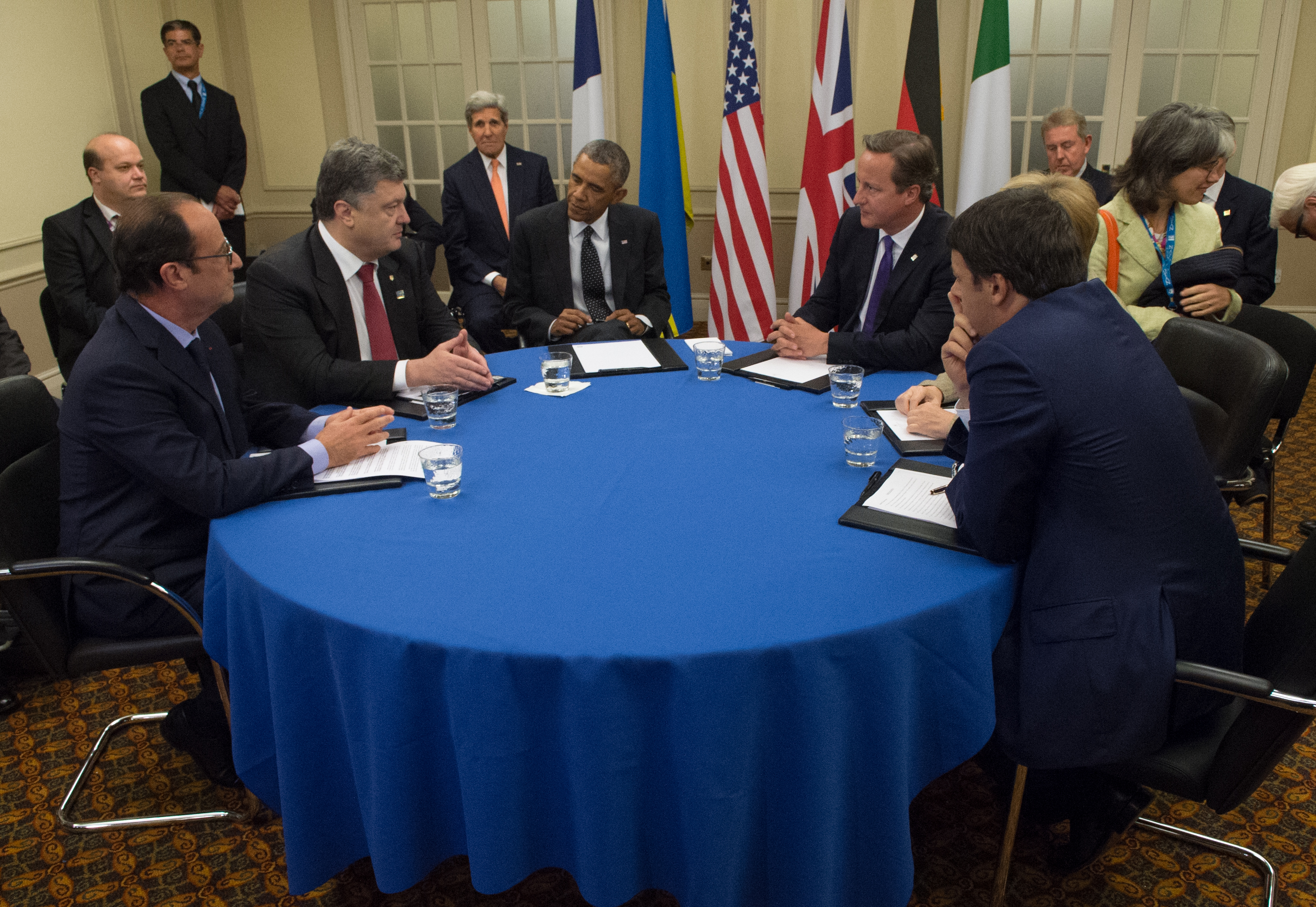
Ukrainian President Poroshenko speaks with Barack Obama and other Western leaders during the NATO Summit in Newport, 4 September 2014

=== Labelling of the conflict ===
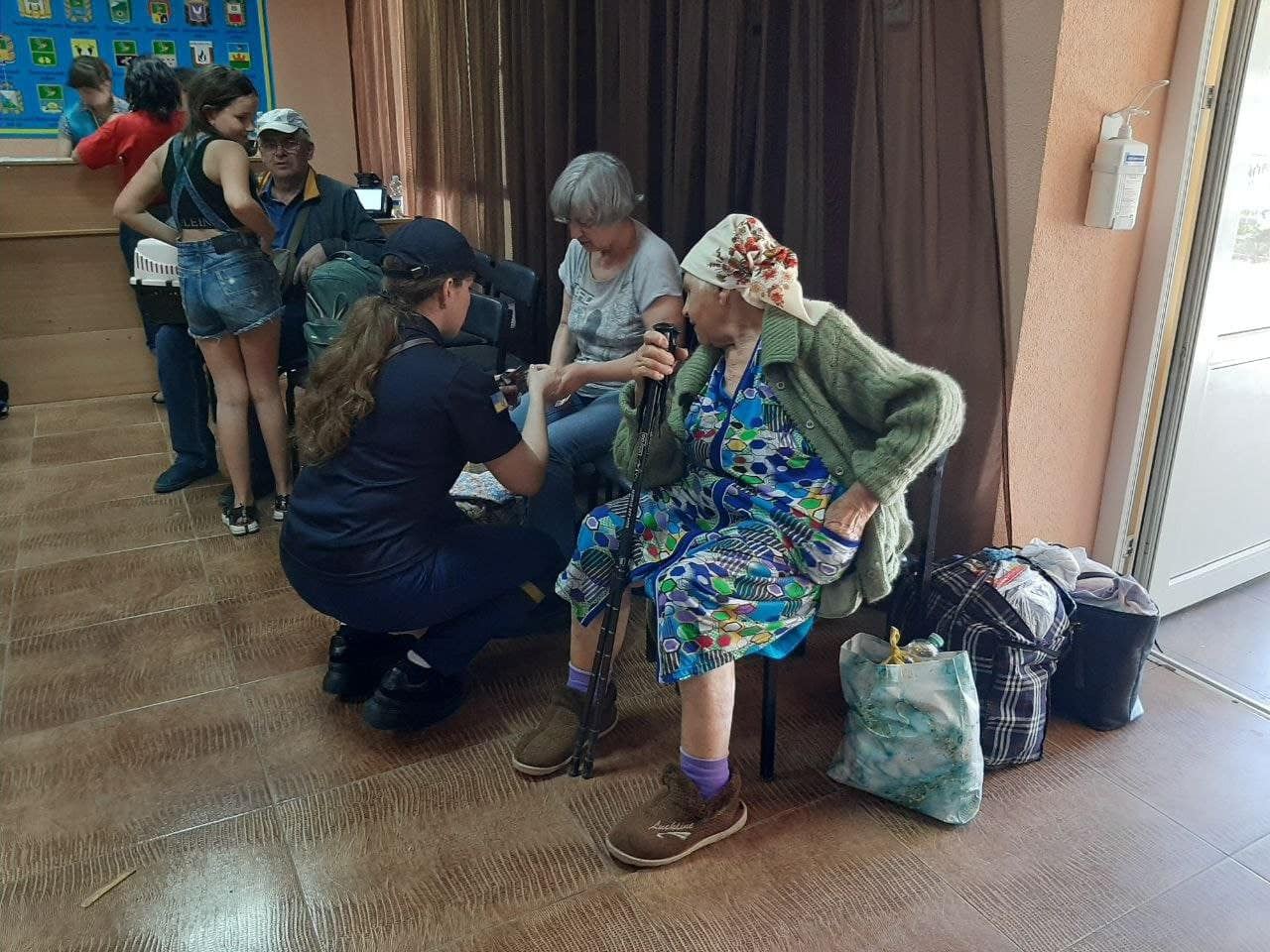
Displaced people from the occupied territories of Kharkiv and Luhansk during the Russian invasion of Ukraine in Donbas

The understanding of the nature of the conflict in the Donbas has evolved over time.

Chairman of the Verkhovna Rada Oleksandr Turchynov said in June 2014 that he considered the conflict a direct war with Russia. According to Ukrainian president Petro Poroshenko, the war will be known in history of Ukraine as the "Patriotic War".

NATO said in July 2014 that it considered the conflict a war with Russian irregulars, and others considered it to be a war between Russian proxies and Ukraine. The International Committee of the Red Cross described the events in the Donbas region as a "non-international armed conflict" in July 2014. Some news agencies, such as the Information Telegraph Agency of Russia and Reuters, interpreted this statement as meaning that Ukraine was in a state of "civil war". Following the August 2014 invasion by Russian forces, in early September 2014, Amnesty International said that it considered the war to be "international", as opposed to "non-international".

According to a VTSIOM survey taken in August 2014, 59% of the Russian citizens polled viewed the war in the Donbas as a civil war. Most of those polled said that direct war with Ukraine was either "absolutely impossible" or "extremely unlikely". 28% said that such a conflict could happen in the future.

Secretary General of Amnesty International Salil Shetty said that "satellite images, coupled with reports of Russian troops captured inside Ukraine and eyewitness accounts of Russian troops and military vehicles rolling across the border leave no doubt that this is now an international armed conflict". The conflict has also been classified as part of a "hybrid war" waged by Russia against Ukraine.

Until early 2015, the European Union tended to label the participants of the conflict as "foreign armed formations" or Russian-supported separatists. After the delivery of an IntCen classified report in January 2015, the official EU documents acknowledged the presence of the Russian military in the area and started openly referring to "Russian troops in Ukraine".

A 2015 paper released by the Royal United Services Institute and a 2017 report by the RAND Corporation document how the conflict evolved from a localised proxy conflict in its early stages to a hybrid war between Russian and Ukraine, and then to a limited conventional war with the August 2014 direct invasion by Russian troops.

The Prosecutor of the International Criminal Court issued a report in November 2016 as part of its preliminary examination. The report stated that by 30 April 2014, it seemed that the high intensity of military conflict had triggered the law of armed conflict with the "DPR" and "LPR" as parties. It further stated that engagements between Ukrainian and Russian armed forces in eastern Ukraine suggested the existence of a parallel international armed conflict by 14 July 2014. It observed that, if it were determined that Russia had exercised overall control over the militant groups, this would comprise only a single international armed conflict that would trigger application of the Rome Statute. (Note: The report stated that its ongoing investigation would focus on determining whether or not it could assert that an international armed conflict existed between Ukraine and Russia in eastern Ukraine.) The day following the release of the report, Russia announced its intention to withdraw from joining the International Criminal Court (ICC). (Note: While Russia was a signatory to the Rome Statute, this had not been ratified, i.e. Russian laws had not been amended to acknowledge the authority of the statute. Russia formally notified the UN of its withdrawal on 30 November 2016.)

The District Court of The Hague delivered a judgment in the Malaysia Airlines Flight MH17 murder trial on 17 November 2022, including the conclusion that Russia exercised overall control over the DPR from mid-May 2014 onwards, and that therefore an international armed conflict was taking place (although the DPR defendants lacked combatant immunity due to their and Russia's denials of membership in the Russian Armed Forces). The European Court of Human Rights ruled on 25 January 2023 that from 11 May 2014, and at least up to 26 January 2022, separatist-controlled areas in eastern Ukraine were under the "spatial jurisdiction" of Russia, because it had effective control over these areas through its presence, and through its influence on the "DPR" and "LPR".
