= Humanitarian impact of the war in Donbas =

Impact of war in Ukraine, 2014-

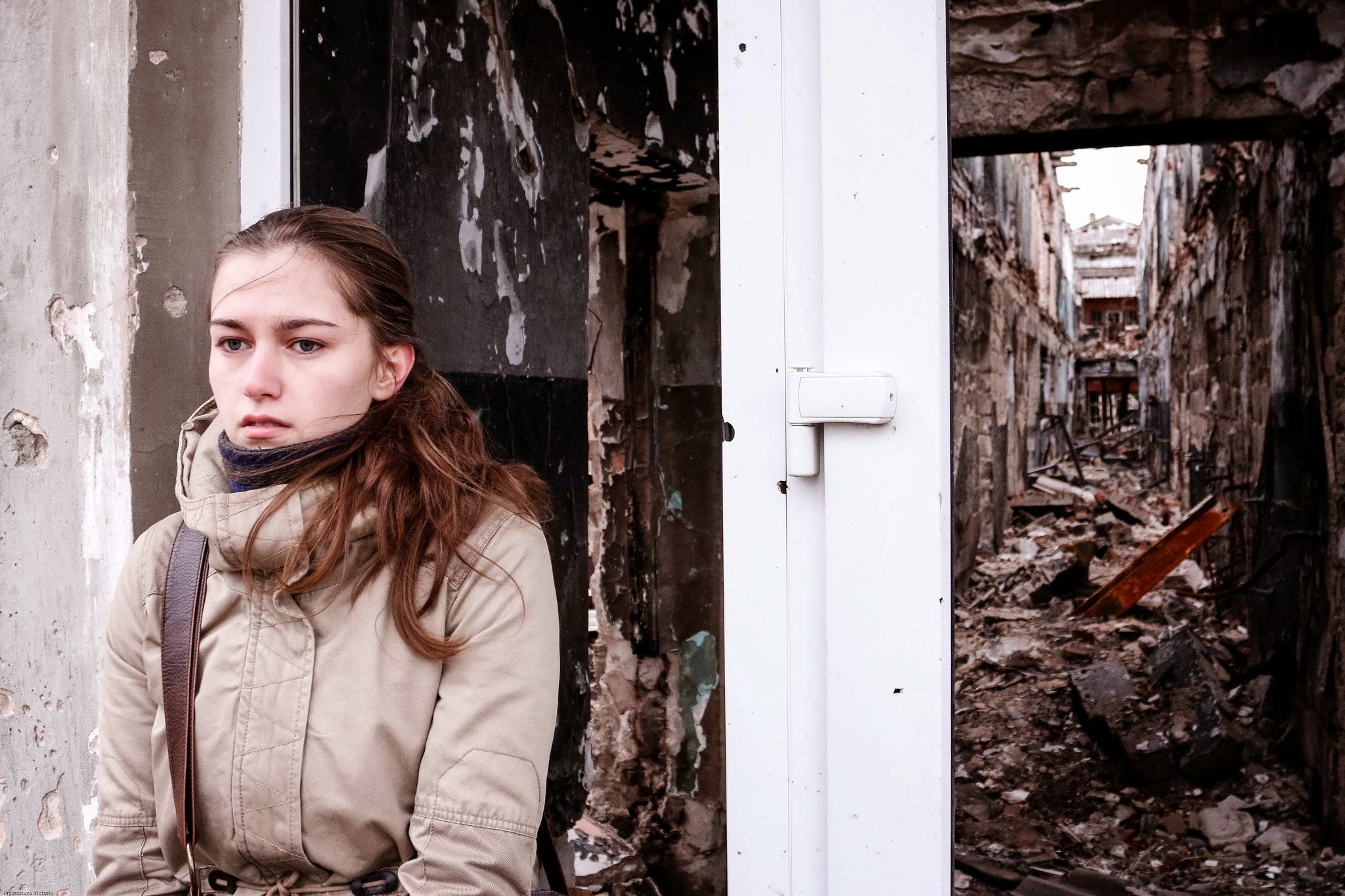
Damaged building in Kurakhove, 26 November 2014

During the ongoing Russo-Ukrainian War between the Ukrainian government forces and pro-Russian separatists in the Donbas region of Ukraine that began in April 2014, many international organisations and states noted a deteriorating humanitarian situation in the conflict zone.

A May 2014 report by the United Nations said there had been an "alarming deterioration" in human rights in territory held by Russian separatists affiliated with the Donetsk People's Republic (DPR) and Luhansk People's Republic (LPR). The UN Human Rights Monitoring Mission in Ukraine (HRMMU) reported growing lawlessness in the region, documenting cases of targeted killings, torture, and abduction. HRMMU also reported threats against, attacks on, and abductions of journalists and international observers, as well as the beatings and attacks on supporters of Ukrainian unity. A report by Human Rights Watch said "Anti-Kiev forces in eastern Ukraine are abducting, attacking, and harassing people they suspect of supporting the Ukrainian government or consider undesirable ... anti-Kiev insurgents are using beatings and kidnappings to send the message that anyone who doesn't support them had better shut up or leave".

Non-governmental organisations, such as Amnesty International, also raised concerns about the behaviour of some Ukrainian volunteer battalions. Amnesty International said that they often acted like "renegade gangs", and were implicated in torture, abductions, and summary executions.

In a report from HRMMU, again in May 2014, Ivan Šimonović, UN Assistant Secretary General for Human Rights, wrote about illegal detention, abduction and intimidation of election officials in the self-proclaimed pro-Russian republics, and called for urgent action to prevent a Balkans-style war. He also warned of a humanitarian crisis due to a failure of social services in the region, and an exodus of people from affected areas. In October 2015, the DPR and LPR banned non-governmental organisations such as Doctors Without Borders and World Food Programme from the territory that they control. A report released on 3 March 2016 by the Office of the United Nations High Commissioner for Human Rights (OHCHR) said that people that lived in separatist-controlled areas were experiencing "complete absence of rule of law, reports of arbitrary detention, torture and incommunicado detention, and no access to real redress mechanisms". In addition, the report noted "allegations of violations perpetrated with impunity by Ukrainian law enforcement officials—mainly elements of the Security Service of Ukraine (SBU)—including enforced disappearances, arbitrary and incommunicado detention, and torture and ill-treatment".

According to the United Nations Children's Fund (UNICEF), "The results of a psychosocial assessment of children in Donetsk Oblast in Eastern Ukraine are deeply troubling ... and indicate that about half of all children aged 7–18 have been directly exposed to adverse or threatening events during the current crisis." OSCE monitors spoke to refugees from Donetsk city in Zaporizhia. They said that men were "often not allowed" to leave the city, but were instead "forcibly enrolled in 'armed forces' of the so-called 'Donetsk People's Republic' or obliged to dig trenches".

By June 2015, the conflict had created 1.3 million internally displaced people (IDPs). According to the OHCHR, this number had grown to 1.6 million people by early March 2016. As of December 2022, the total number of IDPs has increased to 5.9 Million following the Russian invasion.

== Casualties ==
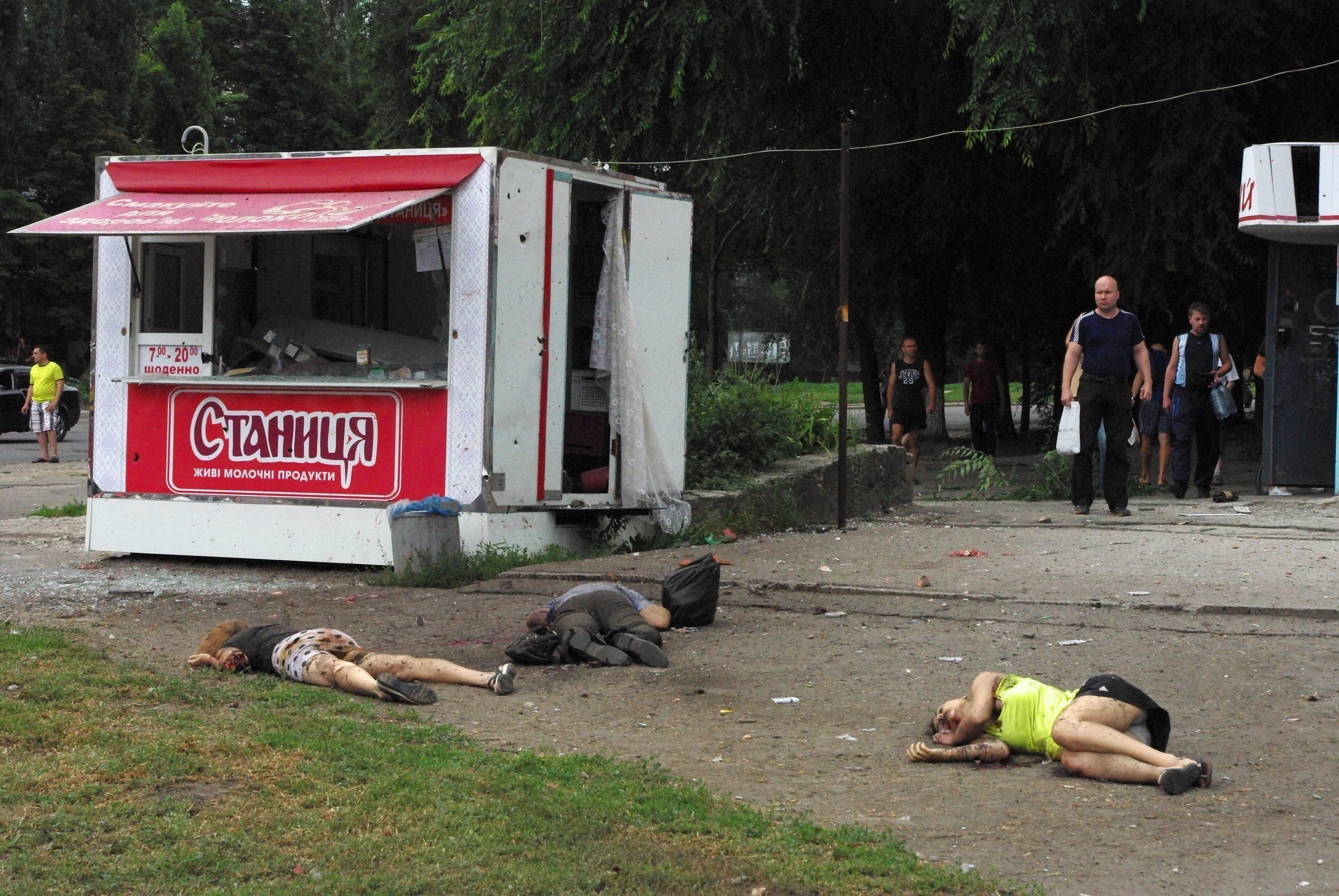
Civilians killed by shelling in Luhansk, 18 June 2014

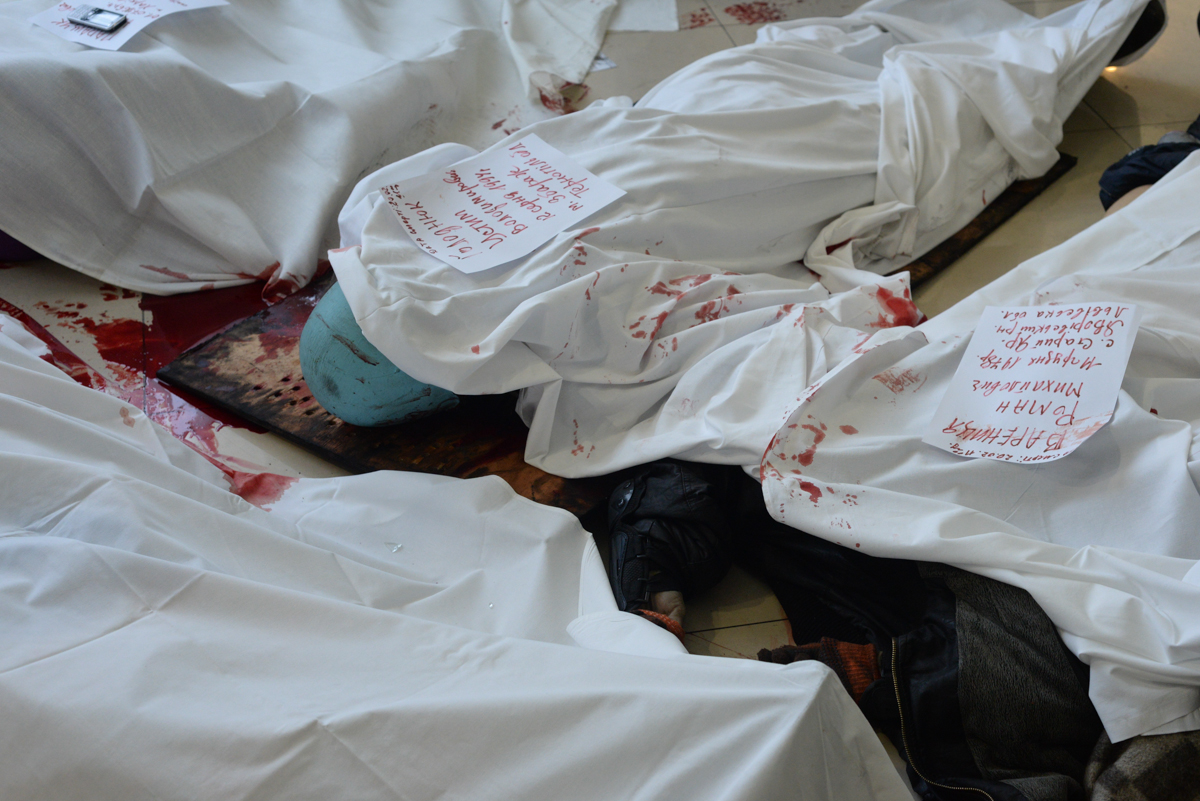
Bodies of protesters in the hotel Ukraine lobby in Kyiv, Ukraine, 20 February 2014.

A report by the OHCHR released on 28 July 2014 said that based on "conservative estimates", at least 1,129 civilians had been killed since mid-April during the fighting, and that at least 3,442 had been wounded. Another OHCHR report, released on 20 November, estimated that the overall number of people killed in the conflict had risen to 4,317, and that at least 9,921 had been wounded.

Amidst a large-scale escalation in fighting during January and February 2015, the number of casualties greatly increased. According to another OHCHR report based on Ukrainian government sources, 843 people were killed in Donbas from 13 January to 15 February. 359 of these were civilians. 3,410 people were injured during the same period, of which 916 were civilians. By 15 February 2015, 5,665 people had been killed since the start of the war in mid-April 2014, whilst 13,961 had been injured. According to the report, these numbers were "very conservative", and based only on "available data". The report went on to say that "the actual number of casualties is likely to be far higher since military and civilian casualties remain under-reported". On 19 February 2016 UNICEF stated that in 2015 more than 20 children were killed and over 40 were injured.

Land mines laid during the conflict have also taken civilian victims. The State Emergency Service of Ukraine has stated it had cleared Donbas of more than 44,000 mines by early December 2015. It is currently unclear how many unexploded devices remain. According to UNICEF in 2015 28 children had been casualties due to mines and unexploded ordnance.

According to a United Nations early March 2016 report over 3 million people lived in the conflict zone. 2.7 million of them lived in the areas controlled by separatist forces, while 200,000 people resided in the proximity to the contact line.

== Refugees ==
Some refugees from the Donbas fled to parts of western and central Ukraine, such as Poltava Oblast. Around 2,000 families from the Donbas were reported to have taken refuge in the southern Ukrainian city of Odesa. Other refugees from Luhansk fled to Russia during the week-long ceasefire that was declared 23 June 2014 and in effect until 27 June. As of June 2014, at least 110,000 people had left Ukraine for Russia in the wake of the conflict, according to a United Nations report. Refugees clustered around Rostov-on-Don, with 12,900 people, including 5,000 children, housed in public buildings and tent camps there. Similarly, the report stated that around 54,400 are internally displaced people (IDPs) within Ukraine itself.

Between 15,000 and 20,000 refugees arrived in Svyatogorsk from Sloviansk after the Ukrainian Armed Forces intensified shelling on the city at the end of May 2014. Remaining residents of the besieged city were without water, gas, and electricity. Despite this, most residents remained. Russian officials said that 70,000 refugees had fled across the border into Russia since the fighting began. Starting on 30 May, at least 1,589 refugees from Donetsk and Luhansk oblasts were provided temporary accommodation in railway stations and railway hotels by Southern Railways. The largest number of refugees, 1,409 people, stayed at Kharkiv-Pasazhyrskiy railway station.

Camps for internally displaced people were established in Kharkiv Oblast. OSCE monitors visited one camp at Havryshi, in Bohodukhiv Raion, after northern Donetsk Oblast had been retaken by government forces. Some of those displaced people had visited Sloviansk, and said that there was a lack of water, electrical power, food, and that banks were not operating. Some decided to continue to stay in the camp until conditions in Sloviansk improved, whereas others decided to return. By 16 July, thirty-six people had returned to Sloviansk. Another seventy people were meant to return on the day. Some sixty-five from other conflict areas also checked into the camp. According to railway operators, some 3,100 people used the Kharkiv–Sloviansk railway from 9–14 July. OSCE monitors also met with some refugees in Zaporizhzhia. The refugees said that many residents of Donetsk wanted to leave, but were unable to because they lacked the financial resources to do so. Trains leaving Donetsk were said to be filled to capacity, forcing many refugees to use private motorcars to escape.

According to a United Nations OHCHR report, the number of internal refugees created by conflict reached 101,617 on 25 July 2014, an increase of more than 15,000 since 15 July. The report also said that at least 130,000 had fled to Russia. OSCE monitors visited Sievierodonetsk on 29 July, after the city had been recaptured by governments forces. According to the OSCE, the situation had normalised, and the city had not been "severely damaged" during the conflict. The city's mayor said that 40% of the 120,000 residents had fled during war.

By early August, at least 730,000 had fled fighting in the Donbas and left for Russia. This number, much larger than earlier estimates, was given by the Office of the United Nations High Commissioner for Refugees (UNHCR). Numbers of internal refugees rose to 117,000. By the start of September, after a sharp escalation over the course of August, the number of people displaced people from Donbas within Ukraine more than doubled to 260,000. The number of refugees that fled from Donbas to Russia rose to 814,000. The UNHCR expressed concerns over the displaced refugees as the winter sets in and was providing supplies to help them cope with the winter.

Having been inundated with refugees from the Donbas, the Russian government established a resettlement programme that was meant to encourage refugees to settle in "far-flung" parts of Russia. This programme included guarantees of employment, accommodation, pensions, and a path to Russian citizenship. According to a 31 August report by the administration of Rostov Oblast, 42,718 Donbas refugees had been transported to cities across Russia for resettlement.

As the shaky ceasefire implemented by the Minsk Protocol became increasingly untenable in early November 2014, it was reported that the number of people that had fled insurgent-held areas of Donbas had reached one and a half million. About half of these fled to Russia, and the other half fled to peaceful parts of Ukraine. As such, the population of insurgent-held Donbas had decreased by a third from its pre-war level. Those forced to stay in the region were largely elderly, destitute, or otherwise unable to flee. Schools became greatly diminished, as roughly half of the pre-war population of school-age children had left Donbas. According to an OHCHR report, the number of refugees displaced from Donbas within Ukraine was 466,829 in mid November.

Increased fighting during January and February 2015 led to a sharp increase in the number of people displaced from Donbas. According to the State Emergency Service of Ukraine, the number of registered IDPs had reached 711,209 by 13 February 2015. Accommodation for IDPs in areas neighbouring the conflict zone had been exhausted by this point. Instead, refugees that arrived at reception points in cities like Sloviansk and Kharkiv were granted a free train ticket to areas in southern and western Ukraine.

In June 2015, the UN identified that 75% of the IDPs had resettled amidst their communities in the provinces of Luhansk, Donetsk, Kharkiv, Zaporizhia and Dnipropetrovsk.

According to a United Nations early March 2016 report 1.6 million people were registered internally displaced by the Ukrainian government. 800,000 to 1 million of them lived within Ukrainian government controlled Ukraine.

== Abductions and torture ==
Since the start of the war, many people were taken hostage or abducted by separatists affiliated with the Donetsk and Luhansk people's republics. Apart from ordinary citizens taken as forced labour by separatists, these include journalists, city officials, local politicians, and members of the Organization for Security and Co-operation in Europe (OSCE). A particularly large number of hostages were taken by Vyacheslav Ponomarev in Sloviansk, though these were later freed when government forces recaptured the city. Ponomarev later complained in Russian media that while they were fighting in Slavyansk, other militia groups were busy with theft of humanitarian help and property of civilians in Donetsk.

Separatists in Donetsk raided the city's International Committee of the Red Cross office at 19:00 on 9 May 2014, and captured large stocks of medical supplies. They detained between seven and nine Red Cross workers. Those taken prisoner were accused of espionage, and held in the occupied Donetsk RSA building. They were later released on 10 May. One of the prisoners was found to have been severely beaten. The OSCE mission in Ukraine lost contact with four of its monitors in Donetsk Oblast on 26 May, and another four in Luhansk Oblast on 29 May. Both groups were held for a month, until being freed on 27 and 28 June respectively.

In early July 2014, Amnesty International published evidence of beatings, torture, and abduction of activists, protesters and journalists by separatists in the Donbas region since the start of the unrest in April. It said that "while most abductions appear to have a 'political' motivation there is clear evidence that abduction and torture is being used by armed groups to exert fear and control over local populations". The report also said that some people had been abducted for ransom. The report summarised its finding by stating that "the bulk of the abductions are being perpetrated by armed separatists, with the victims often subjected to stomach-turning beatings and torture. There is also evidence of a smaller number of abuses by pro-Kyiv forces."

A report by the United Nations OHCHR that was released on 28 July said that insurgent groups continued "to abduct, detain, torture and execute people kept as hostages in order to intimidate and to exercise their power over the population in raw and brutal ways". The report documents that at least 812 people have been abducted by separatists since mid-April, and said that these include "local politicians, public officials and employees of the local coal mining industry", and that "the majority are ordinary citizens, including teachers, journalists, members of the clergy and students".

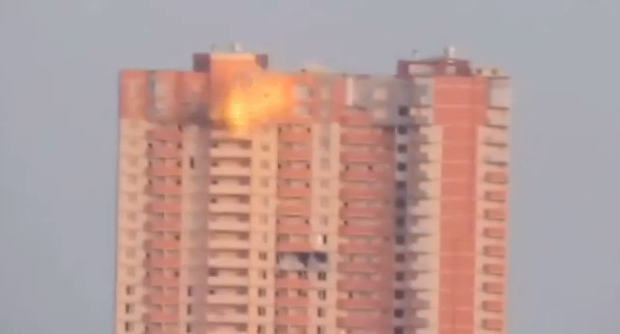
Shells hit residential building in Luhansk, 7 August 2014

In early August, Amnesty International voiced concerned about actions of Radical Party leader and member of the Verkhovna Rada Oleh Lyashko. Lyashko is the leader of a pro-government paramilitary that participated in the war in Donbas. According to the Amnesty International report, Lyashko conducted a "continuing campaign of violence, intimidation and abduction against individuals". As an example of this "campaign", the report cited the abduction of DPR defence minister Igor Kakidzyanov. The abduction was recorded by Lyashko's forces. In the video, Kakidzyanov was seen being abducted, and later, after having been captured, "dressed only in his underwear with two bleeding cuts to his body".

In mid August, there were reports that members of the pro-government Aidar Battalion paramilitary had taken hostages and demanded ransom for their release. In one incident, a man from Polovynkyne in Luhansk Oblast was accused of "separatism" by members of the battalion, and taken hostage. The paramilitaries said that they would kill him unless his wife paid 10,000 US dollars in ransom. She did this, and the man was released. OSCE monitors said that "the man's head was heavily swollen, bloody, and bruised" and he had "bruises and smaller wounds on his arms and legs". Another man was taken captive by members of Aidar Battalion in Shchastia on 13 August. Also accused of "separatism", his current whereabouts are unknown.

A statement released on 22 August 2014 by Lithuanian foreign minister Linas Antanas Linkevičius said that the Lithuanian honorary consul in Luhansk, Mykola Zelenec, was abducted by pro-Russian separatists and killed. Linkevičius defined the abductors as 'terrorists'. A report released on the same day by Human Rights Watch criticised government forces for "the serial arrests of Russian journalists in Ukraine" and "the actions of extremists like parliamentarian Oleh Lyashko, who has repeatedly abducted and abused people accused of involvement with the insurgency". Another report released in late August by Human Rights Watch said that separatist forces were "arbitrarily detaining civilians and subjecting them to torture, degrading treatment, and forced labour", and that the separatists "detained civilians for use as hostages". Izolyatsia prison in Donetsk is a notorious site of illegal detention and torture. One of the first recorded cases of torture of prisoners of war in Ukraine was an incident on 7 October 2014, in the city of Zuhres (Donetsk region), when 53-year-old Ukrainian Ihor Kozhoma, who was trying to take his wife out of the occupied territory, was tied to a column and tortured for several hours by Russians and local separatists. A similar case was with Donetsk resident Iryna Dovhan (civilian) who was publicly tortured for her pro-Ukrainian position.

A report by the OHCHR that was released on 2 March 2015 said that Ukrainian law enforcement agencies had engaged in a "pattern of enforced disappearances, secret detention and ill-treatment" of people suspected of "separatism" and "terrorism". In addition, the report noted that DPR leader Alexander Zakharchenko said that his forces detained up to five "Ukrainian subversives" each day. It was estimated that about 632 people were under illegal detention by separatist forces on 11 December 2014.

On 2 June 2017, the freelance journalist Stanislav Aseyev was abducted. The de facto DNR government initially denied knowing his whereabouts. On 16 July, an agent of the DNR's "Ministry of State Security" confirmed that Aseyev was in their custody and that he was suspected of "espionage". Independent media is not allowed to report from the "DNR"-controlled territory. Aseyev was released as part of an exchange of prisoners in 2019 after more than two years in Izolyatsia.

In early May 2024, Artem Lysohor, the Ukrainian Head of the Luhansk Regional Military–Civil Administration, claimed that since 6 May 2024 mothers giving births in the Russia's controlled part of the Luhansk Oblast hospitals will have to prove that one of the newborn's parents have a Russian citizenship, otherwise they will not be allowed to leave the hospitals with their newborns who may be taken away. There is no confirmation of these claims.

== Living conditions in the conflict zone ==
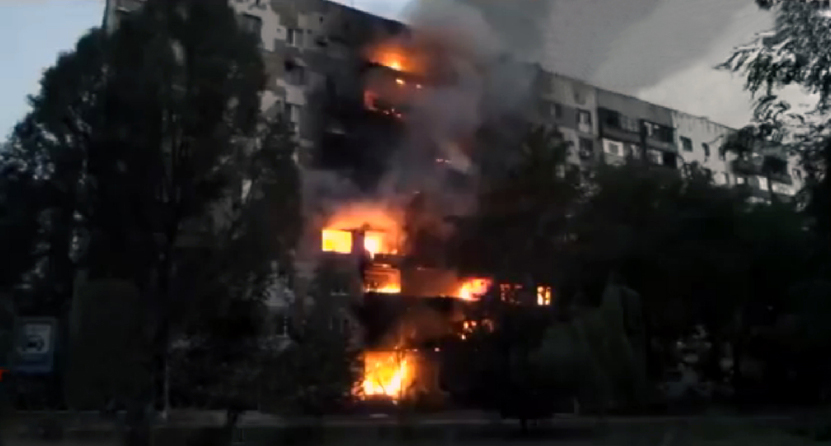
Burning block of flats in Shakhtarsk, 3 August 2014

Monitors from the OSCE mission in Ukraine met with the self-proclaimed mayor of Sloviansk, Volodymyr Pavlenko, on 20 June 2014. According to him, sewage systems in Sloviansk had collapsed, resulting in the release of least 10,000 litres of untreated sewage into the river Sukhyi Torets, a tributary of the Seversky Donets. He called this an "environmental catastrophe", and said that it had the potential to affect both Russia and Ukraine.

The DPR imposed martial law on 16 July.

OSCE monitors spoke to refugees from Luhansk city in early August. As government forces encircled the city, the refugees said that all electricity, water, and mobile connections were cut off. They said that the city was being shelled non-stop from 04:00 to 02:00 each day, with only a brief lull from 02:00 to 04:00. All shops were closed, and were few supplies remained in the city. Bread was nowhere to be found, and tap water was undrinkable. Anyone that could flee city had done so, and only those without money stayed. Corpses were buried in back gardens, as no undertakers were operating.

Government forces shelled the DPR-occupied SBU building in the city of Donetsk on 7 August. In doing this, however, a public hospital and residential buildings fewer than 500 metres (550 yd) from that building were hit by the shells. The entire second floor of the hospital was destroyed, and patients were traumatised. One civilian at the hospital died. A report by The New York Times said that separatists fired mortars and Grad rockets from residential areas, and then quickly moved. This caused return fire by government forces to hit those areas, usually an hour later, after the separatists had already left.

OSCE monitors spoke with another group of refugees on 11 August, this time from Pervomaisk. According to the refugees, most people had fled Pervomaisk, with only 10,000 of the city's 80,000 inhabitants remaining. They said that the city was under heavy shelling by government forces from 22 July, that almost all blocks of flats had been damaged, and that only 30% of detached houses remained standing. They also said that at least 200 people had been killed. After having spoken to the refugees, OSCE monitors contacted the mayor of Pervomaisk, who confirmed the reports of the refugees.

A report by The New York Times said that pro-Ukrainian unity residents in Donetsk city were intimidated by the separatists. Another report by American radio network NPR said that some separatists in Donetsk used carjackings, forced labour, and abuse to intimidate those that oppose them, and that some local residents lived in fear of the separatists. According to the United Nations in December 2014, 300 instances of indiscriminate shelling of residential areas for which no party to the conflict had assumed responsibility had been recorded.

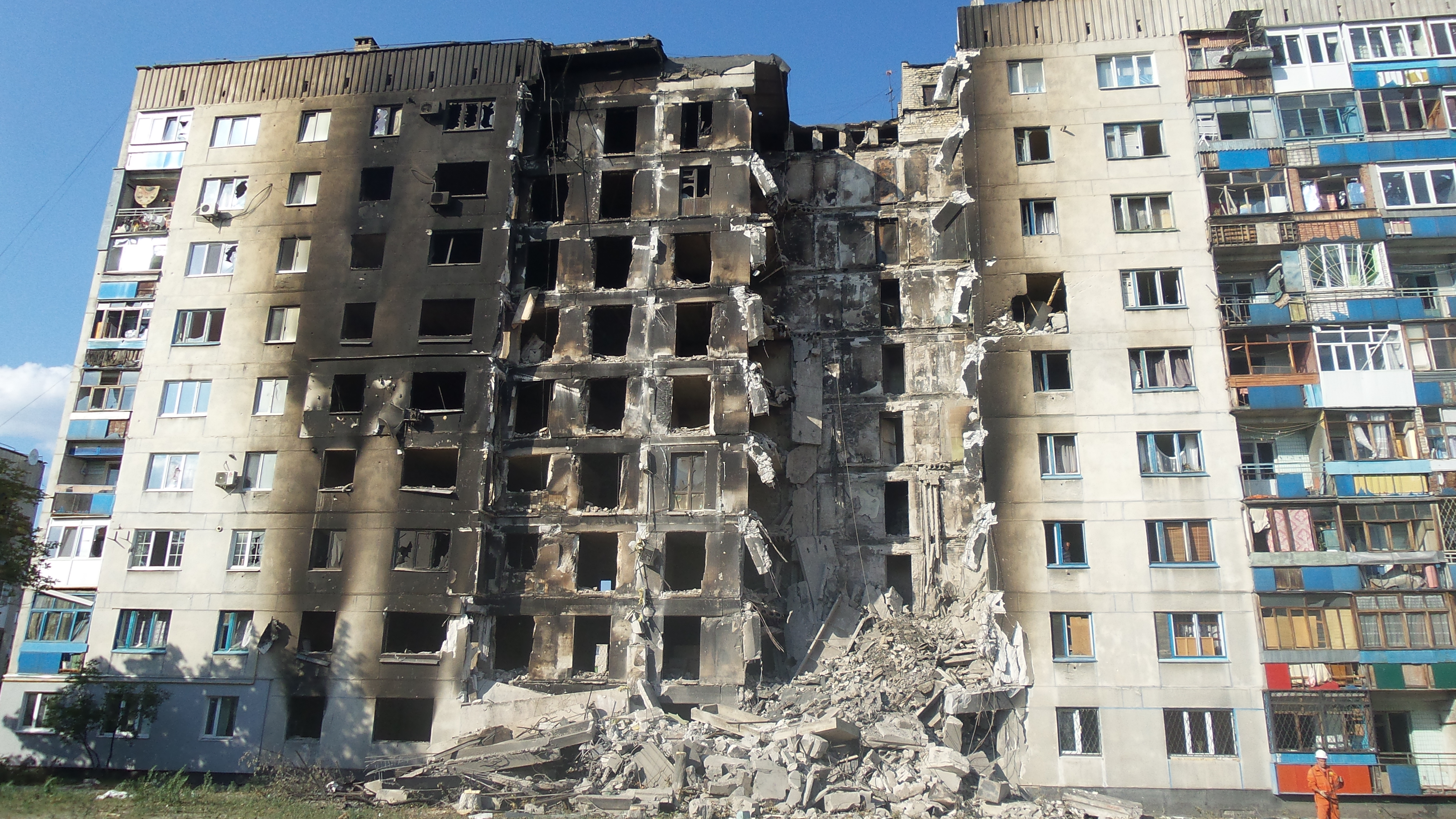
Damaged building in Lysychansk, 4 August 2014

Living conditions in the combat zone deteriorated heavily amidst a new separatist offensive in January 2015. Rimma Fil, a worker with the Rinat Akhmetov Foundation, said that "the situation was bad before, but now it is a catastrophe". According to her, tens of thousands of people were suffering hunger. Medicines were largely unavailable. The worst affected were those that lived in the sprawling rural areas outside of major cities, who often lacked access coal for heating during the bitter winter. The situation was greatly exacerbated by the late 2014 move by the Ukrainian government to cut off all pension payments to people in the separatist-controlled areas, along with hospital, nursing home, prison, and orphanage funding.

According to the United Nations Office for the Coordination of Humanitarian Affairs early 2016 69% of households in separatist controlled areas had difficulty accessing food markets due to rising prices and poverty.

The United Nations World Food Programme (WFP) stated in an April 2016 report that almost 300,000 people in the combat zone were severely food insecure and in need of immediate food assistance. The report said the residents living in the separatist controlled area of Luhansk Oblast and near the conflict line were the most affected by food insecurity. According to the WFP over half of the population, in both the government-controlled area and non-government controlled area, experienced a complete loss or a significant reduction of income.

Separatist authorities have banned most international medical organisations and have taken a hard line on drug addiction, making methadone and substitution therapy illegal. As a result, people living with HIV/AIDS (reportedly three times higher Donbas than in the rest of Ukraine) have fled separatist-controlled areas.

A July 2016, a published analysis of changes in nighttime light intensity by Tom Coupe (Kyiv School of Economics, Ukraine), Michał Myck and Mateusz Najsztub (CENEA, Poland) found that the economic activity in the Donbas had dropped 30 to 50% of the pre-war level for the big cities and to only a tenth of the pre-war level for some smaller cities. It also concluded that the local economy was not showing any signs of improving despite the decrease in military activity since the Minsk I and II agreements in 2015.

The Eastern Human Rights Group (EHRG) stated that 5,000 people in Luhansk People's Republic had been held in solitary confinement, beaten, starved or tortured for refusing to carry out unpaid work. EHRG claimed to have evidence that the situation was similar in Donetsk People's Republic. According to the EHRG "All this takes place for the purpose of enriching a certain group of people in the so-called LPR." Inmates conditions had deteriorated in separatist controlled detention centres and relatives paid LPR authorities to ensure the safety of inmates.

In late September/early October 2016, water stations located in the government-controlled area of Luhansk Oblast stopped functioning as a result of unpaid electricity bills. After the International Committee of the Red Cross paid $700,000 to cover debts for power and water supplies in the separatist controlled territories of Luhansk Oblast they resumed working.

In early 2020, the COVID-19 pandemic was seen to reduce the chances of a resolution to the crisis in Donbas. According to Nataliia Kyrkach, leader of the Slavic Heart humanitarian organisation, as cited in The New Humanitarian, the pandemic caused the situation in Donbas to go backward "100%" to the "dark days" of 2014–2015. Quarantine measures imposed by Ukraine, the DPR, and the LPR prevented those in the occupied territories from crossing the line of contact, removing access to critical resources. Before the pandemic, residents of the DPR and LPR frequently crossed the border into Ukrainian-controlled territory to shop, withdraw money from their Ukrainian bank accounts and collect their state pensions, and a local industry serving these people emerged in towns like Volnovakha; as an example, there were 1.5 million crossings of the line of contact in August 2019. Fighting increased in March, with nineteen civilians killed, more than in the previous five months combined. While some crossings opened to small numbers of people in June 2020, the DPR introduced new regulations, ostensibly to prevent the spread of coronavirus, which made it difficult for most people to cross the line of contact. In contrast, the Russian border completely reopened.

In April 2021 a humanitarian convoy organised by the United Nations crossed into the non-government-controlled area in Donetsk, mainly carrying COVID-19 treatment supplies.

== War crimes ==
According to the International Committee of the Red Cross, the arbiter of international humanitarian law, the conflict is a "war", meaning that war crimes investigations can be held. A press release from the organisation said "These rules and principles [international humanitarian law] apply to all parties to the non-international armed conflict in Ukraine, and impose restrictions on the means and methods of warfare that they may use".

In 2014, Human Rights Watch said that Ukrainian government forces, pro-government paramilitaries, and the separatists had used unguided Grad rockets in attacks on civilian areas, stating that "The use of indiscriminate rockets in populated areas violates international humanitarian law, or the laws of war, and may amount to war crimes". It also stated that pro-Russian separatists "failed to take all feasible precautions to avoid deploying in civilian areas" and in one case "actually moved closer to populated areas as a response to government shelling". Human Rights Watch documented Grad rocket use in civilian areas in the fighting at Donetsk railway station on 21 July, in Kuibyshivskyi district of Donetsk city on 19 July, and in Petrovskyi district of Donetsk city and Marynivka on 12 July. It called on all sides to stop using the "notoriously imprecise" Grad rockets.

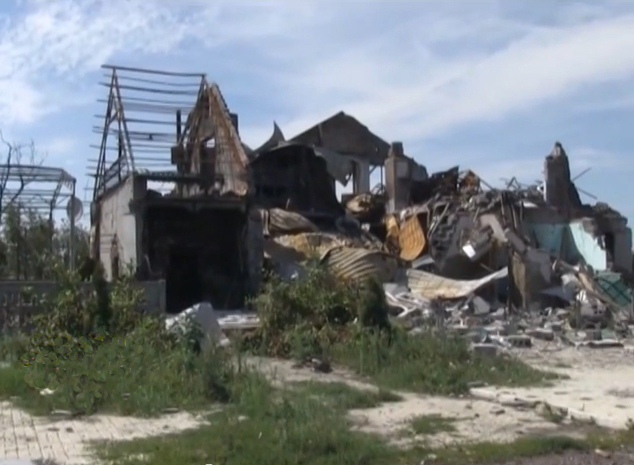
Destroyed house in Donbas, 22 July 2014

Another report by Human Rights Watch said that the separatists had been "running amok...taking, beating and torturing hostages, as well as wantonly threatening and beating people who are pro-Kiev". It also said that the separatists had destroyed medical equipment, threatened medical staff, and occupied hospitals. A member of Human Rights Watch witnessed the exhumation of a "mass grave" in Sloviansk that was uncovered after separatists retreated from the city.

Alleged war crimes in the region include the possible forcible transfer of people – including cases of adults and children – to different parts of the Russian Federation and the Donbas, Iryna Venediktova said. Torture, the killing of civilians and the destruction of civilian infrastructure are also suspected war crimes.

Allegations that Ukrainian army used white phosphorus had been previously reported by Russian state controlled medias from June onward. A 20 June report by Human Rights Watch analysed many of the videos, and determined that the substance shown in the videos was not white phosphorus. They also said that some of the videos cited by the Russian media were actually from a 2004 white phosphorus attack by American forces in Iraq.

Separatists with bayonet-equipped automatic rifles in the city of Donetsk paraded captured Ukrainian soldiers through the streets on 24 August, the Independence Day of Ukraine. During the parade, Russian nationalistic songs were played from loudspeakers, and members of the crowd jeered at the prisoners with epithets like "fascist". Street cleaning machines followed the protesters, "cleansing" the ground they were paraded on. Human Rights Watch said that this was in clear violation of the common article 3 of the Geneva Conventions. The article forbids "outrages upon personal dignity, in particular humiliating and degrading treatment". They further said that the parade "may be considered a war crime". In response, DPR Prime Minister Aleksandr Zakharchenko stated: "We did nothing against international law. The prisoners were not undressed or starved. Show me a single international law which prohibits parading prisoners." In a press-conference on 25 August, Russian Foreign Minister Sergei Lavrov said he "did not see anything close to abuse" at the parade. On the following day, the separatists tied a woman accused of being a spy to a lamppost. They wrapped her in a Ukrainian flag, and had passers-by spit her, slap her, and throw tomatoes at her. She was later identified as Iryna Dovhan.

Amnesty International released a report that documented war crimes committed by pro-government paramilitary territorial defence battalions on 8 September. The report focused on the Aidar Battalion, which operates in the northern part of Luhansk Oblast. Amnesty International Secretary General Salil Shetty, met with Ukrainian prime minister Arseniy Yatsenyuk on the same day, and urged him and his government to bring the territorial defence battalions "under effective lines of command and control, to promptly investigate all allegations of abuses and to hold those responsible to account". He said that the Ukrainian government should not "replicate the lawlessness and abuses that have prevailed in areas previously held by separatists", and that "the failure to stop abuses and possible war crimes by volunteer battalions risks significantly aggravating tensions in the east of the country and undermining the proclaimed intentions of the new Ukrainian authorities to strengthen and uphold the rule of law more broadly".

In late September, DPR forces found several unmarked graves in a coal mine near the village of Nyzhnia Krynka. They said that the graves contained the bodies of both DPR separatists and civilians. OSCE monitors who went to the grave site said that they saw two dirt mounds, each containing two bodies. On the side of a road in the village, OSCE monitors reported that they saw a mound of dirt that "resembled a grave", had "a stick with a plaque" that said "died for Putin's lies", and which also listed the names of five people.

A map of human rights violations committed by the separatists, called the "Map of Death", was published by the Security Service of Ukraine (SBU) in October 2014. The reported violations included detention camps and mass graves. Subsequently, on 15 October, the SBU opened a case on "crimes against humanity" perpetrated by insurgent forces.

A mid-October report by Amnesty International documented cases of summary executions by both pro-Russian and Ukrainian forces. It also said that many abuses were deliberately misreported as "accidents". The report said that an Amnesty International team found no traces of "mass graves", but said that they had documented isolated incidents that could constitute war crimes. It also noted that accusations of abuses were being "inflated" as part of a "propaganda war" waged by both sides, but particularly by Russia. A concurrent report by Human Rights Watch documented widespread use of cluster munitions across the Donbas by Ukrainian government forces in early October, adding that anti-government forces might also have been using the munitions. Ukraine did not sign the 2008 Convention on Cluster Munitions, which banned their usage. Ukrainian forces denied using any cluster munitions, and an OSCE spokesman said that they had found no trace of cluster munitions use in the combat zone. A German foreign ministry spokesman said that the German government had requested an independent inquiry into the matter. On 3 February 2015, the OSCE confirmed that Luhansk had been shelled by 9M55K model Smerch rockets (calibre 300mm) with cluster munitions.

In October 2014, Aleksey Mozgovoy organised a "people's court" in Alchevsk that issued a death sentence by a show of hands to a man accused of rape. Mozgovoy also answered questions from the audience, explaining that he ordered his patrols to "arrest any woman found sitting in a café" because women "should care about their spirituality". This statement caused significant critical response in the Russian media.

Amnesty International reported that it had found "new evidence" of summary killings of Ukrainian soldiers on 9 April 2015. Having reviewed video footage, it determined that at least four Ukrainian soldiers had been shot dead "execution style". AI deputy director for Europe and Central Asia Denis Krivosheev said that "the new evidence of these summary killings confirms what we have suspected for a long time". AI also said that a recording released by Kiev Post of a man, allegedly separatist leader Arseny Pavlov, claiming to have killed fifteen Ukrainian prisoners of war was a "chilling confession", and that it highlighted "the urgent need for an independent investigation into this and all other allegations of abuses".

In December 2015, a team led by Małgorzata Gosiewska published another large report on war crimes in Donbas.

Indiscriminate shelling near water facilities in Donetsk region have a negative impact on the supply of water for the civilian population on both sides of the contact line. In villages Dolomitne, Nevelske, Novooleksandrivka, Opytne, Pisky, Roty, and Vidrodzhenniato the Ukrainian troops block access of the local population to medical care. In addition to this some units of the Ukrainian Armed Forces are reportedly involved in numerous cases of looting of private houses.

=== UN monitoring of abuses ===
At a press conference in Kyiv on 15 December 2014, UN Assistant Secretary-General for human rights Ivan Šimonović stated that the majority of human rights violations committed during the conflict were carried out by the separatists. He also said, however, that this could not be used as an excuse by Ukrainian forces to commit human rights violations.

UN observers also registered multiple episodes of sexual abuse against locals, mainly women, at the border checkpoints run by both Ukrainian forces and pro-Russian armed groups. The presence of combatants in civil communities also brings up a danger of sexual violence against their population and increase the risk of rape and human trafficking.

During 2014 and 2015, the UN Monitoring Mission documented multiple reports about people abducted by pro-Russian armed groups and Ukrainian military forces.

=== International Criminal Court Proceedings ===
On 25 April 2014, the International Criminal Court (ICC) started a preliminary examination of crimes against humanity that may have occurred in Ukraine in the 2014 Euromaidan protests and civil unrest, the 2014 annexation of Crimea by the Russian Federation, and the war in Donbas.

On 11 December 2020, the Prosecutor of the International Criminal Court, Karim Ahmad Khan, found that "there was a reasonable basis to believe that war crimes and crimes against humanity were committed" in the 2014 Euromaidan protests and civil unrest, the 2014 Russian annexation of Crimea and the war in Donbas. He stated that the "alleged crimes identified would [as of December 2020] be admissible" and that there was "a reasonable basis for investigation, subject to judicial authorisation".

== Infrastructure damage ==
A report by the United Nations OHCHR found that at least 750 million US dollars' worth of damage had been done to property and infrastructure in Donetsk and Luhansk oblasts by July. Ukrainian prime minister Arseniy Yatsenyuk said on 31 July that at least ₴2 billion would be allocated to rebuild the Donbas.

Donetsk mayor Oleksandr Lukyanchenko told the OSCE on 4 September that large parts of Donetsk city had been "heavily damaged". He said that "enormous funds" would be needed to repair the damage, and that at least 35 schools had been completely destroyed by shelling.

Ukrainian president Petro Poroshenko said on 22 December that 20% of the Ukraine's industrial output had come from territories now controlled by the DPR and LPR. He also said that roughly half of the industrial infrastructure in separatist-controlled areas had been destroyed during the war.

Hundreds of schools have been destroyed in the conflict zone. Human Rights Watch has accused separatists and the Ukrainian military of using schools for military purposes. According to a Human Rights Watch study schools that were not destroyed have been forced to operate in dangerous and often overcrowded conditions, while many children have been forced to stop attending school altogether. On 19 February 2016, UNICEF stated that, in the conflict zone, "at least one out of five schools has been damaged or destroyed".

== Ecological situation ==
Since the start of the war in Donbas, according to the OSCE, 36 mines in separatist-controlled territory have been destroyed and flooded. This has led to a deterioration of the ecological situation there. In April 2018 80 sources of drinking water in the territory were unfit for use. Studies published by Russian media in 2017 indicated an eightfold increase in the level of salt in the water of the region. The concentration of pollutants in soils, in particular mercury, vanadium, cadmium and strontium, sometimes exceeds norms by 17 times in areas that have seen combat.

== Humanitarian response ==
An emergency meeting of the United Nations Security Council on the subject of the humanitarian situation in Donbas was held on 5 August at Russia's behest. Russia proposed that a "humanitarian mission" be sent to Ukraine to help alleviate the suffering of civilians in the region. Western governments responded hesitantly to the proposal, with British permanent representative to the United Nations Sir Mark Lyall Grant saying "It is deeply ironic that Russia should call for an emergency meeting of the council to discuss a humanitarian crisis largely of its own creation".

The government of Russia stated that it would send a humanitarian convoy to Luhansk city on 11 August, which was completely cut off from electrical power, water, food, and gas supplies amidst a government offensive on separatists in the city. According to government spokesman Dmitry Peskov, the convoy would be dispatched under the "aegis of the Red Cross". Western governments were weary of the plan, which NATO secretary general Anders Fogh Rasmussen said was part of "developing the narrative and the pretext" for an invasion of Ukraine "under the guise of a humanitarian operation". The government of Ukraine said that the convoy would not be allowed to cross the border into Ukraine. Despite this, Russian Foreign Minister Sergei Lavrov said that an agreement between Ukrainian and Russian government officials had been made, which would allow the convoy to drive to the border. At the border, the goods carried would be unloaded and put onto Ukrainian lorries.

The convoy left Moscow on 12 August, despite any evidence of a concrete agreement as to where the convoy would go or what it would carry. It consisted of 280 army lorries, painted white, and was said to carry 2,000 tonnes (2,200 short tons) of goods, "including grain, sugar, medicine, sleeping bags and power generators". A spokesman for the ICRC said that the Russian government had not provided "basic details" about the contents or route of the lorries. There were suggestions that the convoy was a trojan horse (or "Trojan centipede") operation, to "smuggle weapons to rebel militias rapidly running low on fuel and ammunition" Andriy Lysenko, a spokesman for the National Security and Defence Council of Ukraine, said that there were "three conditions" that had to be met by the Russian convoy: it should cross the border at a post controlled by the State Border Guard, it should be accompanied by ICRC workers, and it should clearly state its destination, its route, and what it carried. The Russian government said that its destination was Shebekino-Pletenivka border crossing, in Kharkiv Oblast. The convoy stopped in central Russia, about 300 kilometres (190 mi) from that border crossing, as Ukrainian Internal Affairs minister Arsen Avakov said "no humanitarian convoy of Putin's will be allowed to cross the territory". After some time, the convoy continued to Rostov Oblast. It headed toward insurgent-controlled Izvaryne border crossing, rather than the government-controlled Shebekino-Pletenivka in Kharkiv Oblast that had been agreed. It stopped in a field at Kamensk-Shakhtinsky, 28 kilometres (17 mi) from Izvaryne. Inspectors from the State Border Guard of Ukraine were sent to the field on 15 August to examine the contents of the convoy. The convoy drove to the insurgent-held Izvaryne border crossing on 17 August, after having been declared "legal" by the Ukrainian government. Despite this, the State Border Guard said that they had received no paperwork from the convoy, and the Red Cross had not yet given the convoy clearance to cross into Ukraine, citing "security issues". In a press briefing on 19 August, a spokesman for the National Security and Defence Council of Ukraine said that an advance team of Red Cross workers was sent to the Izvaryne border crossing to assess the convoy, and to organise transport of its cargo to Luhansk. He also said that work on processing the convoy had been delayed because the DPR and LPR had not guaranteed the safety of the Red Cross workers that are meant to drive the convoy to its destination. The Red Cross gave the convoy instructions on how to deliver the goods to Luhansk on 21 August. The instructions dictated that the lorries should drive directly to the delivery point, and must be escorted by the ICRC at all times. Despite these instructions, the convoy entered Ukraine without customs clearance or an ICRC escort on 22 August. SBU chief Valentyn Nalyvaichenko said that this was tantamount to a "direct invasion", and the Red Cross said that it was not part of the moving convoy "in any way". The convoy was escorted into Ukraine by pro-Russian forces affiliated with New Russia. After delivering its cargo somewhere in Luhansk Oblast, the convoy crossed back into Russia at Izvaryne on 23 August.

A series of humanitarian convoys was sent by the Ukrainian government to Luhansk Oblast in August. The first convoys, from the cities of Kyiv, Kharkiv, and Dnipropetrovsk, arrived at Starobilsk and Sievierodonetsk on 8 and 10 August respectively. A total of sixty lorry-loads of aid were sent. Workers with the State Emergency Service of Ukraine continued to operate in areas controlled by the pro-Russian forces, unimpeded by the LPR. They worked with the local Red Cross to distribute aid. Another group of convoys was sent by the Ukrainian government on 14 August. Seventy-five lorries bound for Luhansk and carrying 800 tonnes (880 short tons) of aid left from the same cities as the first group of convoys. According to the government, the aid was transferred to the Red Cross for distribution upon arrival into the combat zone.

Russian Foreign Minister Sergei Lavrov said that Russia hoped to send a second "humanitarian convoy" to the Donbas conflict zone on 25 August. He stated "The fact that the first convoy eventually delivered aid with no excess or incidents gives us reason to hope that the second one will go much more smoothly". This convoy crossed into Ukraine at Izvaryne on 13 September. OSCE monitors said that it consisted of 220 lorries. A third Russian aid convoy bound for Luhansk entered Ukraine at Izvaryne on 31 October. It consisted of about forty vehicles, all of which were inspected by both Russian and Ukrainian border guardsmen.

Amnesty International reported on 24 December 2014 that pro-government volunteer territorial defence battalions were blocking Ukrainian aid convoys from entering separatist-controlled territory. These battalions, such as the Dnipro, Aidar, Donbas and Right Sector, have stopped most convoys from passing through, including those sent by Ukrainian oligarch Rinat Akhmetov. According to the report, the battalions believe that the aid will be sold by the separatists, rather than provided to residents of the Donbas. Furthermore, battalion members insisted that separatist forces needed to release prisoners of war if aid was to be allowed through. As a result of the war, more than half of those residents remaining in the Donbas rely entirely on humanitarian aid. Director of Europe and Central Asia for Amnesty International Denis Krivosheev said that "Checking the content of humanitarian convoys crossing frontline is one thing. Preventing it is another. Attempting to create unbearable conditions of life is a whole new ballgame. Using starvation of civilians as a method of warfare is a war crime". In addition, the report said that the volunteer battalions often act like "renegade gangs", and called on the Ukrainian government to bring them under control.

Stakhanov-based Cossack separatist commander Pavel Dryomov said that the Luhansk People's Republic leadership was stealing aid carried by the Russian convoys, in an apparent confirmation of earlier reports by Ukrainian forces: "Out of ten [Russian] humanitarian convoys, only one has reached the people. Everything else has been stolen".

== Allegations of antisemitism ==
On Passover eve, alleged members of the Donetsk Republic, carrying the flag of the Russian Federation, passed out a leaflet to Jews that informed all Jews over the age of 16 that they would have to report to the Commissioner for Nationalities in the Donetsk Regional Administration building and register their property and religion. It also claimed that Jews would be charged a $50 'registration fee'. If they did not comply, they would have their citizenship revoked, face 'forceful expulsion' and see their assets confiscated. The leaflet stated the purpose of registration was because "Jewish community of Ukraine supported Bendera Junta," and "oppose the pro-Slavic People's Republic of Donetsk." The incident was reported by Jewish community members, and security at the synagogue confirmed that the men returned again on 16 April to further press their point.

The authenticity of the leaflet could not be independently verified. In The New York Times, Brendan Nyhan described the fliers as "most likely a hoax" and referred to the media coverage of an "apparently bogus story". According to Efraim Zuroff of the Simon Wiesenthal Center, the leaflets looked like some sort of provocation, and an attempt to paint the pro-Russian forces as antisemitic. The chief rabbi of Donetsk stated that the flyer was a fake meant to discredit the self-proclaimed republic, and saying that anti-Semitic incidents in eastern Ukraine are "rare, unlike in Kiev and western Ukraine". France 24 also reported on the questionable authenticity of the leaflets. The Israeli newspaper Haaretz noted in its headline that the flier was "now widely seen as fake". In The New Republic, Julia Ioffe also believes it to be a politically motivated hoax, although the perpetrators remain unknown.

Donetsk People's Republic chairman Denis Pushilin initially confirmed that the flyers were distributed by his organisation, but denied any connection to the leaflet's content. Pushilin later denied at a press conference that the DPR had anything to do with the flyer, calling it provocation and a "complete lie".

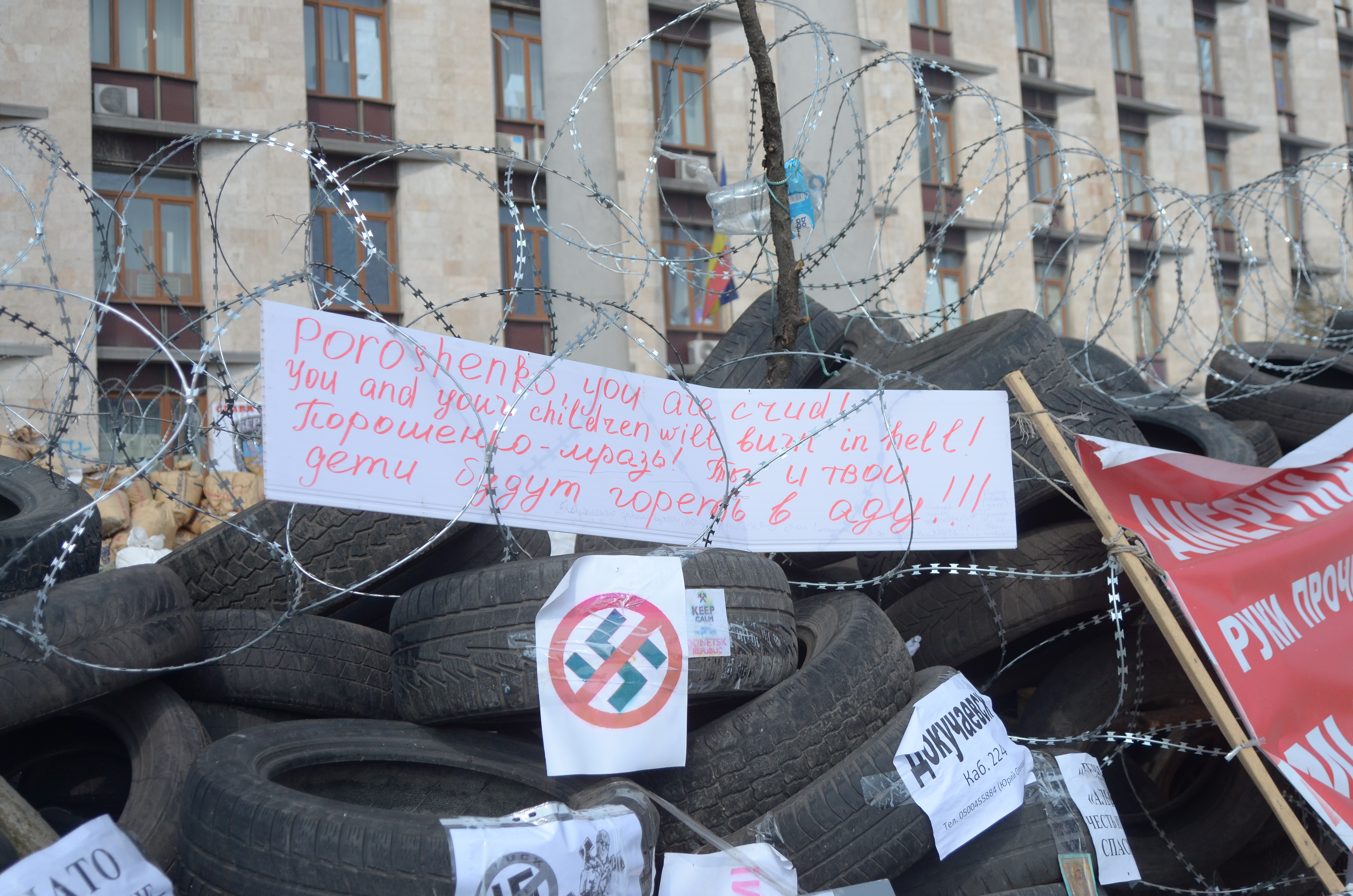
The barricade outside the Donetsk RSA.

According to Donetsk city chief rabbi Pinchas Vishedski, the press secretary of the self-proclaimed republic, Aleksander Kriakov, is "the most famous anti-Semite in the region," and believes the men were "trying to use the Jewish community in Donetsk as an instrument in the conflict."

According to Michael Salberg, director of the international affairs at the New York City-based Anti-Defamation League, it is currently unclear if the leaflets were issued by the pro-Russian leadership or a splinter group operating within the pro-Russian camp or someone else. National Post reported: "Jewish leaders in the city have said they see the incident as a provocation, rather than a real threat to their community of about 17,000 people."

Ukraine's Security Service announced it had launched an investigation on the matter.

On 17 April, pro-Russian separatists aided by Russian military specialists seized a TV tower providing signals to cities in the Donetsk region. Ukrainian channels were removed from air, with Russian channels given the frequencies. On 20 April, which the Euro-Asian Congress noted was Adolf Hitler's birthday, activists boasted about their imminent "victory" in antisemitic terms. "Here, from Sloviansk, we are inflicting a powerful information conceptual blow to the biblical matrix ... to Zionist zombie broadcasting." They then presented a lecture by former Russian Conceptual Party "Unity" leader Konstantin Petrov, who the EAJC described as an "anti-Semitic neo-pagan national-Stalinist sect".

Boruch Gorin, a senior figure in the Federation of Jewish Communities of Russia, told The Jerusalem Post that rebel leaders "have allowed themselves to employ fully anti-Semitic rhetoric on previous occasions." According to Vyacheslav A. Likhachev, researcher with the Euro-Asian Jewish Congress, anti-Semitic statements are part of the "official ideology" of the "people's republics."

== Attacks on Romani people ==
The European Roma Rights Center reported that on April a Romani (also known as Roma or gypsies) man "was shot while trying to defend his home" in Sloviansk. In the same town, The New York Times reported that masked men "acting under the instructions of self-appointed mayor Ponomaryev" looted a Romani house. On 20 April Ponomarev confirmed the attacks and stated that "there have been no attacks on the Roma as such. We are cleaning the city of drugs". On 23 April 2014, more attacks on Romani were reported in Sloviansk, including a man shot in the leg.

The website "romea.cz" stated that Romani have fled Sloviansk "en masse to live with relatives in other parts of the country, fearing ethnic cleansing, displacement and murder". Some men who have decided to remain are forming militia groups to protect their families and homes.

On 8 May 2014, the US mission to the OSCE condemned credible reports of pro-Russian groups establishing "a disturbing and ongoing pattern of anti-Roma violence." The organisation called on Russia "to use its influence with pro-Russia separatist groups to cease their destabilizing activity that could be perceived as enabling violence and intimidation targeted at Roma."

Ukrainian Prime Minister Yatsenyuk said that his government would not tolerate incitement of ethnic hatred and would take all legal measures to prevent the import into Ukraine of anti-Semitism and xenophobia. He instructed law enforcement agencies to identify those distributing hateful material and bring them to justice, as well as those involved in the attacks on Romani.

== Attacks on LGBT people ==
In the territories occupied by Russia, LGBT representatives are persecuted by the government, do not have any protection (including private property) and are deprived of even high-quality medical or legal assistance

== See also ==
- Humanitarian impacts of the Russian invasion of Ukraine
- Volodymyr Ivanovych Rybak, Ukrainian politician murdered by pro-Russian militants
- Stepan Chubenko
- Volnovakha bus attack
- January 2015 Mariupol rocket attack
- Malaysia Airlines Flight 17
- Izolyatsia prison
- February 2015 Kramatorsk rocket attack
- Murder of Pentecostals in Sloviansk
- Novosvitlivka refugee convoy attack
