= 2014 Novosvitlivka refugee convoy attack =

Military attack near Novosvitlivka, Ukraine

- Part of the war in Donbas
- Location: Near Novosvitlivka, Luhansk Oblast, Ukraine
- Date: 18 August 2014
- Attack type: Artillery strike
- Deaths: 17
- Injuries: 6
- Perpetrators: Disputed: Luhansk People's Republic (per Ukraine); Ukraine (per LPR and DPR)

On 18 August 2014, during the war in Donbas, a convoy of refugees fleeing heavy fighting near Novosvitlivka, Luhansk Oblast, Ukraine, was hit by an artillery strike. At least 17 people were killed in the strike which the Ukrainian government blamed on insurgents affiliated with the Luhansk People's Republic. The insurgents denied striking any convoy and blamed the attack on the Ukrainian government.

== Background ==
The convoy was struck near the village of Novosvitlivka, in Krasnodon Raion. The village is southeast of Luhansk city, and is a vital crossroads. Government forces said they had recaptured it from the insurgents on 14 August 2014, but fighting in the area continued.

== Events ==
The convoy was made up of refugees fleeing the intense fighting in the insurgent-occupied city of Luhansk, which was under siege by government forces. The vehicles were flying white flags, to indicate that they were carrying civilians. Within the convoy, there were also some military lorries provided by the Armed Forces of Ukraine. It was travelling on the road between Novosvitlivka and the neighbouring village of Khryashchuvate. A spokesman for the Armed Forces said that the insurgents had been warned that a "convoy with peaceful citizens would be passing" through the area. On this road, it was struck by mortar and Grad rocket fire.

According to the Ukrainian government, the convoy was struck with such force that the people inside the vehicles were "burned alive", and that it was entirely destroyed. They said that separatist insurgents affiliated with the Luhansk People's Republic were responsible for the attack, and that the insurgents had lain in wait to ambush the convoy. They also said that they suspected that the insurgents had used a Russian-made Uragan missile system to carry out the attack. Colonel Andriy Lysenko stated that the insurgents "had perpetrated a bloody crime" with weapons supplied from Russia.

According to the Donetsk People's Republic (DPR) deputy prime minister Andrei Purgin, the area where the attack took place had been constantly barraged by Ukrainian artillery in recent days. He also said that it was the Ukrainian government that was at fault for the attack, and that insurgent forces lacked the "ability to send Grads into that territory". DPR prime minister Aleksandr Zakharchenko stated, "The shelled refugee convoy is a canard. No refugee convoy was at the moment shelled by the DPR or Luhansk People’s Republic."

A spokesman for the government military operation in Donbas said that Ukrainian forces had retrieved fifteen corpses from the convoy's destroyed vehicles, and were in the process of collecting the scattered remains of ten more people killed in the attack. On the day after the attack, Ukrainian government forces said they were trying to recover more remains from the site of the attack but were unable to do so because of heavy fighting in the area. According to them, the bodies found on the day of the attack were "burnt beyond recognition".

The Ukrainian government released a video that they said was an interview with survivors of the attack. One of the survivors said, "We got ready quickly as we could, and jumped in and we were taken off... At the junction, another [vehicle] was waiting for us. We turned and set off, it wanted to follow us, and then a mortar shell fell right on that vehicle and hit the refugees, and cut the vehicle in half".

== Reactions ==
- United States – A statement released by the US State Department condemned the attack, saying "We strongly condemn the shelling and rocketing of a convoy that was bearing internally displaced persons in Luhansk and express our condolences to the families of the victims. Sadly, they were trying to get away from the fighting and instead became victims of it." While the US confirmed that the convoy was hit but said it did not know who was responsible.
- United Nations – A spokesman for UN Secretary-General Ban Ki-moon said that he was concerned over the convoy attack, and hoped for a diplomatic solution to the ongoing war in the Donbas region as soon as possible.
- European Union – From August 18–19 the European Commission President José Manuel Barroso was discussing the situation with the Ukrainian President Petro Poroshenko. Barroso expressed his concern over the Ukrainian security and condemned the attacks. He also urged a thorough investigation into an attack and an end to border hostilities and arms trafficking between both countries.

== See also ==
- January 2015 Mariupol rocket attack
- Volnovakha bus attack
- Malaysia Airlines Flight 17
- Izolyatsia prison
- February 2015 Kramatorsk rocket attack
- Murder of Pentecostals in Sloviansk
- Volodymyr Ivanovych Rybak, Ukrainian politician murdered by pro-Russian militants
- Donetsk "Donetskhirmash" bus station attack
