= Rybak =

Rybak or Ribak (Belarusian: Рыбак, Ukrainian: Рибак, Russian: Рыбак) is a Slavic surname meaning "fisherman" in Belarusian, Polish, Russian, and Ukrainian. A spelling variant is Ryback.

People with the surname include:

== Surname ==
- Alexander Rybak (born 1986), Belarusian-Norwegian singer-composer, violinist, pianist, writer, and actor
- Ewa Rybak (born 1974), female javelin thrower from Poland
- Ihor Rybak (1934–2005), Ukrainian weightlifter and Olympic champion
- Natan Rybak (1913–1978), Ukrainian writer
- Paweł Rybak (born 1967), Polish professional footballer
- Pavel Rybak (born 1983), Belarusian professional footballer
- R. T. Rybak (born 1955), American mayor of Minneapolis, Minnesota
- Yury Rybak (born 1979), Belarusian judoka and Sambo wrestler
- Louis Leon Ribak (1902–1979), American social realist and abstractionist painter
- Volodymyr Vasylyovych Rybak (born 1946), Ukrainian politician
- Volodymyr Ivanovych Rybak (1971–2014), Ukrainian politician
- Andrés Rivera, (born Marcos Ribak; 1928–2016), Argentinian author

== See also ==
- Ryba
- Riba
- Rybakin
- Rybkin
