= Volodymyr Rybak =

Volodymyr Rybak is the name of two Ukrainian politicians:

- Volodymyr Rybak (politician, born 1946), Chairman of the Verkhovna Rada from 2012-2014, member of Party of Regions
- Volodymyr Rybak (politician, born 1971), city councillor in Horlivka, member of Batkivshchyna, murdered in 2014

== See also ==
- Rybak
