= Eurasian Migrant Crisis =

Eurasian Migrant Crisis may refer to:

- Refugees of the war in Donbass
- European migrant crisis
