= Khriashchuvate =

Rural-type settlement in Luhansk Oblast, Ukraine

Khriashchuvate Хрящувате
- Rural settlement
- Location within Luhansk Oblast Location within Ukraine
- Coordinates: 48°31′00″N 39°25′17″E
- Country: Ukraine
- Oblast: Luhansk Oblast
- Raion: Luhansk Raion
- Hromada: Molodohvardiisk urban hromada
- Founded: 1951

Area
  - Total: 6.054 km^{2} (2.337 sq mi)
- Elevation: 55 m (180 ft)

Population (2022)
  - Total: 1,216
  - Density: 200.9/km^{2} (520.2/sq mi)
- Time zone: UTC+2 (EET)
  - Summer (DST): UTC+3 (EEST)
- Postal code: 94457
- Area code: +380 06435

Khriashchuvate (Ukrainian: Хрящувате; Russian: Хрящеватое, romanized: Khryashchevatoye) is a rural settlement in Molodohvardiisk urban hromada, Luhansk Raion, Luhansk Oblast (region), Ukraine, located 39 kilometres (24 mi) from Sorokyne. Khriashchuvate has been under the control of the Lugansk People's Republic (LPR / LNR) from autumn 2014, in the war in Donbas. Following their 2022 annexation referendum, Russia claimed the entire Luhansk Oblast, including Khriashchuvate, as part of their LPR / LNR. As of 2022, the population of Khriashchuvate was 1216.

== History ==
The settlement was founded in 1951, in the time of the Ukrainian Soviet Socialist Republic. The name Khriashchuvate comes from the "Khriash" stones which are found around the settlement. Khriashchuvate remained part of the Ukrainian SSR until its dissolution in 1991, and was from then part of independent Ukraine.

From 2014, Khriashchuvate, as all of Donbas, became caught up in the aftermath of Euromaidan. From April 2014, pro-Russia separatists started taking over parts of the south and east of Ukraine. In April 2014, Luhansk and the surrounding area, including Khriashchuvate, was taken over by Russian-backed forces of the self-proclaimed Luhansk People's Republic. The Ukrainian Government launched an anti-terrorist operation in mid-April 2014, with the aim of taking back all territories under separatist control. In May, the 2014 Donbass status referendums were held. According to separatist authorities, the referendums returned an overwhelming majority vote to cede from Ukraine into the Donetsk and Luhansk People's Republics, however they were vastly considered to be sham votes and condemned by the west, and did not obtain international recognition.

After several months of little military progress, in July 2014 the Ukrainian forces made sweeping territorial gains, capturing swathes of territory from pro-Russia rebels across Donbas. In late July, Ukrainian forces took control of Khriashchuvate, along with nearby Novosvitlivka. These locations were intended to be key staging posts for the larger Ukrainian objective of encircling, then taking control of, the city of Luhansk. The next few weeks would see fierce fighting between sides. Despite having made advances and territorial gains in July, strong rebel resistance would see Ukrainian forces struggling to hold their positions in August. In early August, Ukrainian forces stated that they were still in control of Khriashchuvate and neighbouring Novosvitlivka. In mid-August 2014, the Novosvitlivka refugee convoy attack, in which a truck carrying refugees fleeing war, including children, was hit by a missile strike with a reported minimum of 17 people, mostly civilians killed, occurred near Khriashchuvate, in territory controlled by Ukraine at that time. Details of the event, and blame, are disputed.

In the second half of August, Ukrainian sources were reporting fighting going on for control of the settlement. Under heavy pressure, Ukrainian forces retreated from Khriashchuvate in late August 2014, as LPR forces took control of the settlement, and nearby Novosvitlivka. Hostilities had seen Khriashchuvate largely destroyed. Khriashchuvate would come to global attention in 2015, in the context of attention on the destroyed settlement of Pervomaisk, a settlement also occupied by Russian-backed forces. UK Newspaper The Guardian cited Khriashchuvate and Novosvitlivka as being the first examples of settlements almost entirely destroyed by the war.

== Geography ==
Khriashchuvate is 63 kilometres (39 mi) from Izvaryne, where there is the de jure international border between Ukraine and Russia.

== Notable people ==
- Kateryna Fomenko (born 1962), Ukrainian politician (People's Party)
