= Kramatorsk Airport =

Airport in Donetsk Oblast, Ukraine

Kramatorsk Airport Краматорський аеродром
- Control tower
- IATA: KRQ; ICAO: UKCK

Summary
- Airport type: Military airfield
- Owner/Operator: Ukrainian Army
- Location: Donetsk Oblast Kramatorsk
- In use: Military
- Occupants: Ukrainian Army
- Elevation AMSL: 646 ft (197 m)
- Coordinates: 48°42′20″N 37°37′44″E

Map
- Location in Ukraine

Runways
Direction	Length		Surface
Direction	ft	m	Surface
09/27	8,202	2,500	concrete

Kramatorsk Airport, also known as Kramatorsk military airfield, is a military airfield in Donetsk Oblast of Ukraine. The airbase is 3.4 km SSE from the centre of Kramatorsk and at about 20 km south of Slovyansk.

== History ==
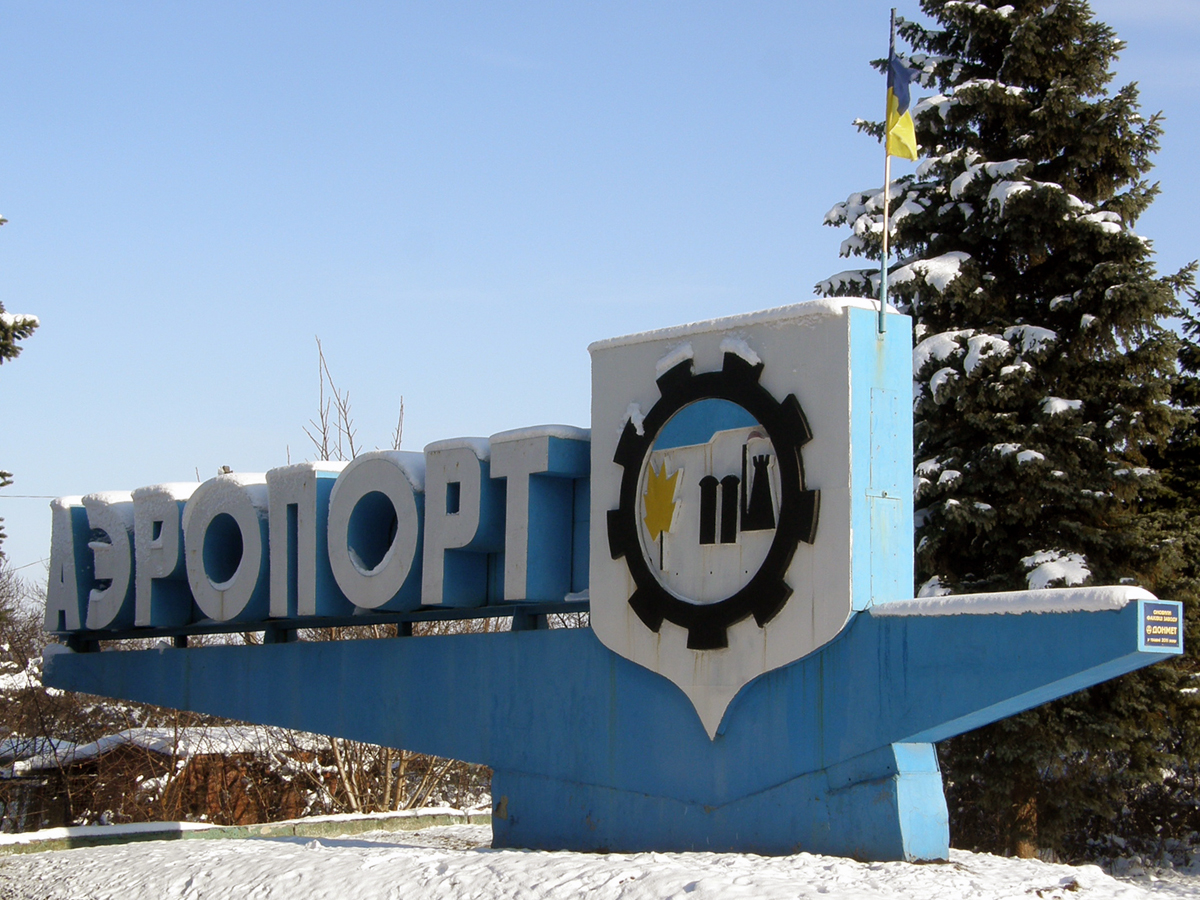
Road sign

The first known aircraft landing in Kramatorsk took place on 25 May 1930, when a K-5 aircraft powered by a Hornet engine and piloted by M. A. Snegiryov landed near the city.

In 1934, the Kramatorsk Aeroclub was established. In autumn 1935, the aeroclub acquired two U-2 aircraft and began training parachutists. By the time it was closed in 1941, the aeroclub had trained 2,800 pilots and aviation technicians.

During the Second World War, the airfield was actively used by German forces, who were also responsible for its construction. From this airfield, among other operations, German aviation conducted bombing raids on Stalingrad. The site was likely captured by German troops on 16 May 1942, when the 78th Light Anti-Aircraft Battalion received orders to establish air defence there. The airfield featured a natural-surface runway measuring 1,380 × 1,110 metres. Soviet forces recaptured the airfield on 6–7 September 1943.

Since 1953, the airbase hosted the 636th Fighter Aviation Regiment, equipped with MiG-15bis aircraft. In May 1960, the regiment converted to the MiG-17, and in 1970 to the Su-15T.

The airfield was captured by pro-Russian forces during the early phases of the War in Donbas in 2014. On 15 April 2014 the airfield was recaptured by the Ukrainian military. Different sources stated the death toll up to 11. On 10 June 2014 the Ukrainian military claimed that about 40 pro-Russian fighters were killed in a 3-hour battle. As a result of shelling, that was carried by pro-Russian forces on 10 February 2015 ten people were injured at the military base.

The airfield was among the first military bases bombarded in the early hours of 24 February 2022, at the beginning of the Russian invasion of Ukraine.

== See also ==
- Battle of Kramatorsk
