= Ryback (surname) =

Ryback is a surname, a spelling variant of Rybak. Notable people with this surname include:

- Casey Ryback, fictional Navy SEAL commando and counter-terrorist in the Under Siege films played by Steven Seagal
- Issachar Ber Ryback, Ukrainian-French painter
- Timothy W. Ryback (21st century), American historian

== See also ==
- Rybak (disambiguation)
- Ryback, ring name of Ryback Reeves (born 1981), is an American professional wrestler.
