= Russian Orthodox Army =

Nationalistic militia

- Русская православная армия
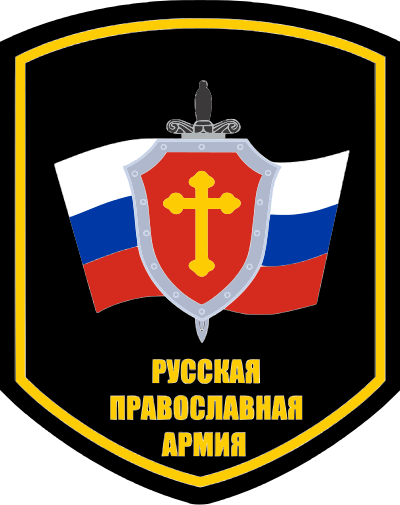
- Emblem of the Russian Orthodox Army
- Leader: Pavel Gubarev
- Dates active: 2014
- Headquarters: Donetsk, Donetsk Oblast, Ukraine
- Active regions: Donbas, Ukraine
- Ideology: Russian nationalism; Russian Orthodox extremism; Anti-Ukrainian sentiment; Anti-Catholicism; Anti-Protestantism
- Size: 4,000
- Wars: Russo-Ukrainian War
- Website: https://web.archive.org/web/20140714131831/http://rusarmy.su/

The Russian Orthodox Army, ROA (Russian: Русская православная армия, Russkaya pravoslavnaya armiya) was a Russian separatist paramilitary group in Ukraine that has been fighting Ukrainian forces in the Donbas war. It was founded in 2014. The ROA was later absorbed into the 5th Oplot Separate Infantry Brigade.

== Background ==
The Russian Orthodox Army was one of the number of pro-Russian separatist militia units in the Donbas region described as "pro-Tsarist", "extremist" Eastern Orthodox Christian.

Starting with the onset of insurgency in Ukraine in early 2014, many central figures in Donetsk were referred to be directly or indirectly related to the neo-Nazi paramilitary Russian National Unity (RNU), led by Alexander Barkashov. Most notable are the leader Dmitri Boitsov who is said to have been taken orders directly from Barkashov, which Barkashov later confirmed during an interview, and Pavel Gubarev, a prominent spokesman with held multiple titles (leader of the Donbas militia, governor of the Donetsk People’s Republic, its foreign affairs minister, and the founder of the New Russia Party), who besides stating ROA was organised by RNU under his control also declared himself leader of the RNU section in Donetsk. Exactly when the RNE affiliates were created in Ukraine has not been possible to establish. Historian Marlène Laruelle states that while there are suspicions of former RNU-leader Barkashov being close to commander Verin, no reliable sources in Ukraine can verify that, and ROA's own Facebook page displayed no direct connection with RNE.

ROA reportedly had 100 members at the time of its founding, including locals and Russian volunteers. As fighting between separatists and the Ukrainian government worsened in Donbas, their membership rose to 350. Later on, the ROA reportedly had 4,000 members according to Russian journalists, while eyewitnesses estimated their membership to be at 500.

== Engagements ==
Notable engagements of the ROA include the June 2014 skirmishes in Mariupol and Amvrosiivka Raion. The headquarters of the ROA is located in an occupied Security Service of Ukraine (SBU) building in Donetsk city. Members had no special training apart from the usual conscription service in the army and swore allegiance to Igor Girkin ("Strelkov"), insurgent and Minister of Defence of the self-declared Donetsk People's Republic, as of January, 2017.

== Religious persecution ==
Along with other separatist groups in the region, the ROA has been accused of "kidnapp[ing], beat[ing], and threaten[ing] Protestants, Catholics, and members of the Ukrainian Orthodox Church ... as well as participat[ing] in anti-Semitic acts."

The organisation was also involved in the 2014 massacre of Protestants in Sloviansk, which was apparently also motivated by religious hatred of Protestants, whom the members themselves associate with 'US agents'. Church officials believe that it was an act of religious persecution.

In late November 2014, the group gained attention after abducting prominent Ukrainian Greek Catholic priest, Sergeii Kulbaka, and Roman Catholic priest, Father Pawel Witek. According to the Defence Ministry of Ukraine, the ROA was also in conflict with another pro-Russian militia, the Vostok Battalion, which accused the ROA of looting and avoiding combat.

== Aftermath ==
In September 2014, the ROA changed its format and joined the new Oplot Fifth Separate Infantry Brigade.
