= Novosvitlivka =

Novosvitlivka (Ukrainian: Новосвітлівка) may refer to the following places in Ukraine:

- Novosvitlivka, Luhansk Oblast, urban-type settlement in Luhansk Raion, Luhansk Oblast
- Novosvitlivka, Mykolaiv Oblast, village in Voznesensk Raion, Mykolaiv Oblast
