= Volnovakha bus attack =

Rocket strike on a Ukrainian highway checkpoint

- Part of the War in Donbas
- Location of Donetsk Oblast in Ukraine

- Buhas checkpoint (Donetsk Oblast)
- Location: 47°36′45.4″N 37°31′45.5″E; Donetsk–Mariupol road ( H 20) at Buhas, near Volnovakha; Donetsk Oblast, Ukraine
- Date: 13 January 2015 c. 14:30 EET (UTC+2)
- Target: Buhas checkpoint
- Attack type: Rocket strike
- Weapon: MRL BM-21 Grad
- Deaths: 12
- Injuries: 18
- Perpetrators: Donetsk People's Republic (per Ukraine); Ukrainian Armed Forces (per Russia)
- Motive: Attack on fortified facilities

The Volnovakha bus attack was an attack on a highway checkpoint near the village of Buhas outside of the Volnovakha municipality in the Donetsk Oblast, Ukraine on 13 January 2015. It resulted in the deaths of 12 passengers of an intercity bus and injuries to 18 others in the area. The attack was the largest single loss of life since the signing of the Minsk Protocol in September 2014, which attempted to halt the War in Donbas. The incident has been labeled an "act of terror" by both the Ukrainian authorities as well as the rebels.

Initially, separatists took responsibility for this incident, which they thought was a successful destruction of the Ukrainian roadblock. After the information about civilian bus hit the news, they denied having "even technical possibilities" to shell that area. OSCE Special Monitoring Mission inspecting the place of incident assessed from its study of five craters that they were caused by "rockets fired from a north-north-eastern direction". HRW investigation has concluded that "The attacked checkpoint is the northern-most government checkpoint before the front line with rebel forces. The tube-like shape of the craters clearly indicated that the rockets had come from the northeast."

The checkpoint named "Buhas" is located on the H20 highway at the intersection with another road accessing the city of Volnovakha. Beside Buhas and Volnovakha, there also is a village of Blyzhnie.

== Attack ==
Video from a tower camera near the checkpoint

Video of explosion near the bus filmed on a car dashcam

On 13 January, a bus was carrying civilians moving northward to Donetsk from the village of Zlatoustivka (Zlatoustovka) and passing a small city of Volnovakha on the Donetsk-Mariupol road (H20 highway). Approaching the zone controlled by the Donetsk People's Republic, the bus stopped at the checkpoint for passport control. Soon thereafter the checkpoint was fired upon, with multiple rockets landing next to the line of vehicles, including the bus. Shrapnel from a round tore through and completely disabled the bus, while killing and injuring several passengers. Ten people perished on site, while two more died soon after being brought to the hospital in Volnovakha.

The Ukrainian government's official version states that pro-Russian militants tried to shell positions near the Buhas checkpoint, which is 35 kilometres (22 mi) from the city of Donetsk. Donetsk Prosecutor's Office reported that militants fired more than 40 shells at the highway despite knowing the fact that it had been used only by civilians. An official of the Donetsk Oblast Interior Ministry said, "It was a direct hit on an intercity bus".

According to the head of the main command center of the Armed Forces of Ukraine, Bohdan Bondar, the attack was launched from the center of Dokuchaievsk (city surrounded by the Volnovakha Raion), which is less than 35 kilometres (22 mi) away, as a provocation. When the attack happened, "there were reporters of local and Russian TV channels… who came there to film how our troops would return fire on the center of the city". The Ukrainian military labelled the incident a "provocation." Despite this, Ukrainian forces did not return fire.

The Donetsk People's Republic denied any involvement and said that the attack might have been staged by Ukrainian Army. Andrei Purgin, a Donetsk Republic party politician, said that "We don't have the capability to shell this checkpoint either from the side of Telmanove or Yelenivka. The Ukrainian side has to figure out what has happened deep in its territory. It's very far from the contact line". Denis Pushilin, another DPR leader, said that nearest rebel artillery was 50 km away, too far to reach the attack site. At the same time, NewsFront published a video of some militant leader boasting about a successful attack on Hranitne from Telmanove. The attack on Hranitne resulted in death of a 2-year-old child.

An OSCE report confirmed that a Grad rocket from north-northeast had struck the bus, and said that DPR forces, the Russian Armed Forces, and the Ukrainian Armed Forces would conduct a joint investigation into the incident. Ukrainian president Petro Poroshenko blamed the attack on separatist insurgents, and declared a day of national mourning.

== Legal ==
On 17 January 2017 Ukraine's Ministry of Foreign Affairs filed a suit with the International Court of Justice, accusing the Russian Federation of "acts of terrorism, discrimination, and unlawful aggression" against Ukraine. The attack on Volnovakha was cited by Ukraine as an example of Russia supporting illegal armed groups engaged in terrorist activities.

== Reactions ==
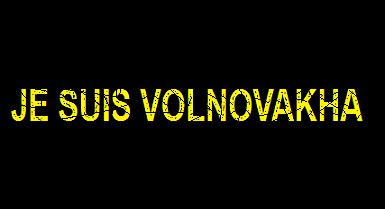
As a response to the terror attack, a copycat version of the Je Suis Charlie sign was held up in Kyiv during a protest against the incident.

Ukraine – President of Ukraine Petro Poroshenko said the attack "chilled the heart", and blamed rebel forces for the attack. He said "These deaths are on the conscience of the DPR and LPR gangs and on those who stand behind them". He compared the Charlie Hebdo shooting with events in Volnovakha and called the world to unite in the fight against terrorism. Additionally, he posted on Facebook an image of a bullet-riddled bus above the caption "je suis Volnovakha" while others carried signs in peaceful protest. At the same time Ministry of Foreign Affairs of Ukraine made a statement stressing that the tragedy couldn't have been a coincidence, but was intentionally committed by the terrorist groups supported by the Russian Federation, and called the world to resolutely condemn this terrible terrorist act as well as all their crimes against humanity. Prime Minister of Ukraine Arseniy Yatsenyuk and the head of the Ukrainian Orthodox Church - Kyiv Patriarchate Patriarch Filaret in their statements called the international community to recognise DPR and LPR as terrorist organizations. After that Verkhovna Rada asked for the same. January 15 was declared as the Day of Mourning for the people murdered by terrorists. State officials paid a tribute to the perished by a minute of silence. On Sunday January 18, hundreds peacefully marched in Odesa and in Kyiv near Independence Square carrying Je Suis Volnovakha and Я Волноваха placards.

European Union – European External Action Service made a statement, in which expressed condolences to the families of those who died. They underlined the need for strict observation of the ceasefire. "A lasting ceasefire remains key to the success of the current efforts to reach a sustainable political solution, based on respect for Ukraine's sovereignty and territorial integrity". On January 15 Members of the European Parliament strongly condemned Russia's "aggressive and expansionist policy" and "the acts of terrorism and criminal behaviour committed by the separatists and other irregular forces in Eastern Ukraine". They supported the policy of sanctions, which should stay in place until Russia changes its aggressive policy in Ukraine, respects the ceasefire, withdraws its troops, stops supporting separatists, exchanges all prisoners and restores Ukraine's control over its whole territory, including Crimea, and called to broaden the range of sanctions in the event of further Russian actions destabilising Ukraine. The European Parliament noted that since the Council lifted the arms embargo on Ukraine on 16 July, there are "no objections" to EU countries supplying defensive arms to Ukraine, and suggested that the EU consider helping Ukraine to enhance its defence capabilities. Also they asked the Commission to develop a communication strategy to counter the Russian propaganda campaign, paying attention to its "information war", the EU to deliver "more substantial technical assistance" to help Ukraine to implement reforms and to do more to help tackle its humanitarian crisis, including Crimea.

Russia – Russian Foreign Ministry's envoy for human rights, democracy and the supremacy of law Konstantin Dolgov said that shelling of a passenger bus in eastern Ukraine undermines efforts to reach a peace settlement of the Russo-Ukrainian war. "Kyiv continues to blatantly violate human rights", he underlined. Moscow "demands an impartial investigation of this crime... and punishment of those responsible". The Russian officials offered their condolences to the families and friends of the victims.

Belarus – Belarusian Ministry of Foreign Affairs expressed their deepest condolences to the families and friends of the victims. "This tragic incident once again proves the need for an immediate ceasefire as provided by the Minsk arrangements. We are calling for immediate resuming the work of the Trilateral Contact Group to make urgent decisions in order to resolve the situation in the region and prevent new victims on the territory of our brotherly nation", The Ministry stated.

== See also ==
- Casualties of the Russo-Ukrainian War
- January 2015 Mariupol rocket attack
- List of equipment used by separatist forces of the war in Donbass
- Stepan Chubenko
- Volodymyr Ivanovych Rybak, Ukrainian politician murdered by pro-Russian militants
- Malaysia Airlines Flight 17
- Izolyatsia prison
- February 2015 Kramatorsk rocket attack
- Murder of Pentecostals in Sloviansk
- Novosvitlivka refugee convoy attack
- Donetsk "Donetskhirmash" bus station attack
