= Rybakin =

Rybakin (Russian: Рыбакин; feminine: Rybakina, Russian: Рыбакина) is a Russian surname.

- Dmitri Rybakin (born 1982), Russian former football player
- Elena Rybakina (born 1999), Russian-born Kazakhstani professional tennis player
- Vladimir Rybakin (born 1955), Russian businessman and politician

== See also ==
- Rybkin (Rybkina)
