= Murder of Pentecostals in Sloviansk =

Crime in Ukraine in June 2014

- Part of Russo-Ukrainian War
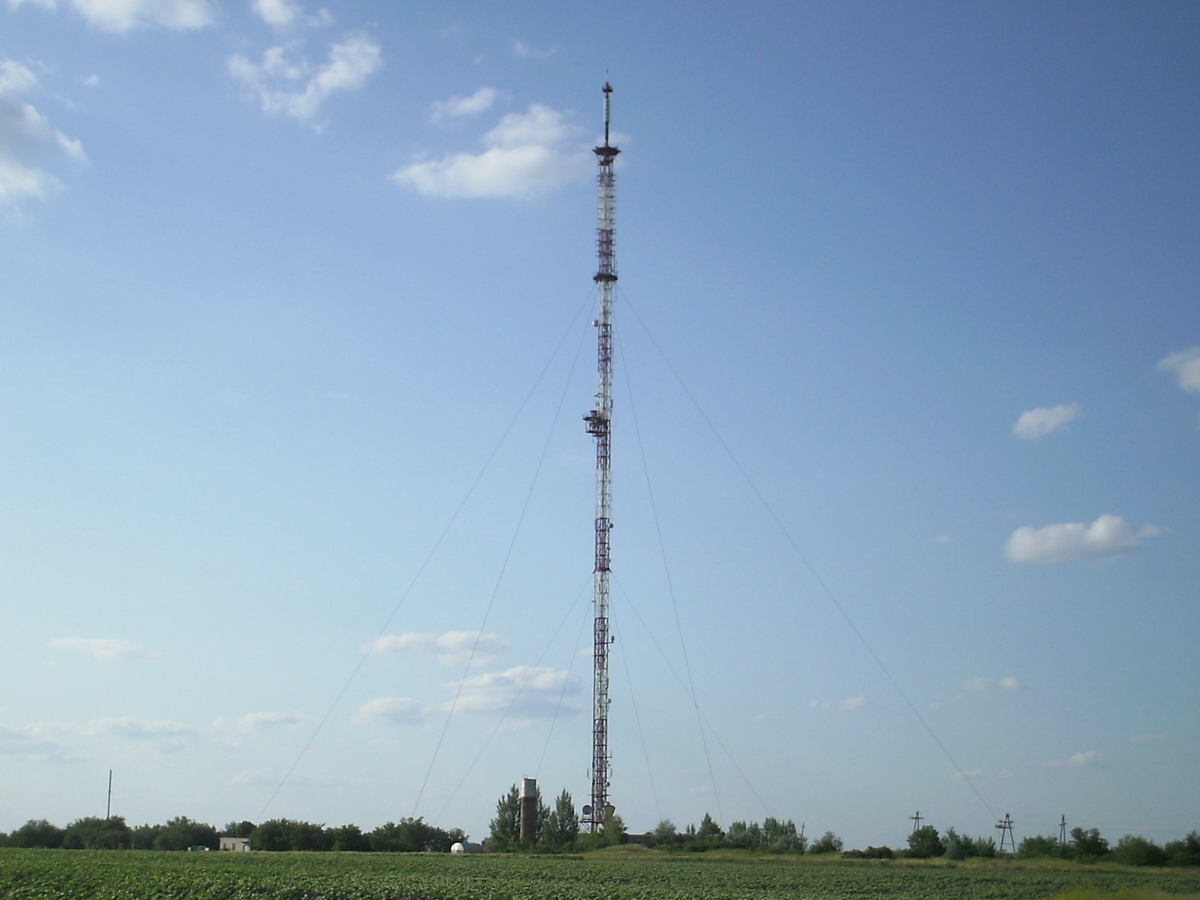
- Mount Karachun, where the Pentecostals were killed

- Location of Sloviansk in Ukraine
- Location: Sloviansk, Donetsk Oblast, Ukraine
- Date: June 2014
- Attack type: Murder
- Deaths: 4
- Perpetrator: Russian Orthodox Army (alleged)

In Sloviansk, Donetsk Oblast, Ukraine, four members of the Transfiguration of The Lord (Ukrainian: Преображення Господнього) Pentecostal church were captured and killed in June 2014, allegedly by members of the Russian Orthodox Army. The reason for the killings is disputed. In a car of one of the kidnapped the money in foreign currency was found, which was the pretext to declare the Protestants American spies. Church officials believe that it was an act of religious persecution.

== Background ==
The Transfiguration of The Lord Pentecostal church in Sloviansk was formed in 2003, and belonged to the Church of Christians of Evangelic Faith of Ukraine. The church used a former Palace of Culture building for its services. Its senior pastor was Alexander Pavenko (Ukrainian: Олександр Павенко, Russian: Александр Павенко).

On April 12, 2014, a group of armed men seized government buildings in Sloviansk with the intention of incorporating the Donbas region into Russia. According to the Bureau of Democracy, Human Rights, and Labor of the US State Department, this began a period of persecution of Protestant denominations in pro-Russian separatist-controlled regions.

== Timeline ==
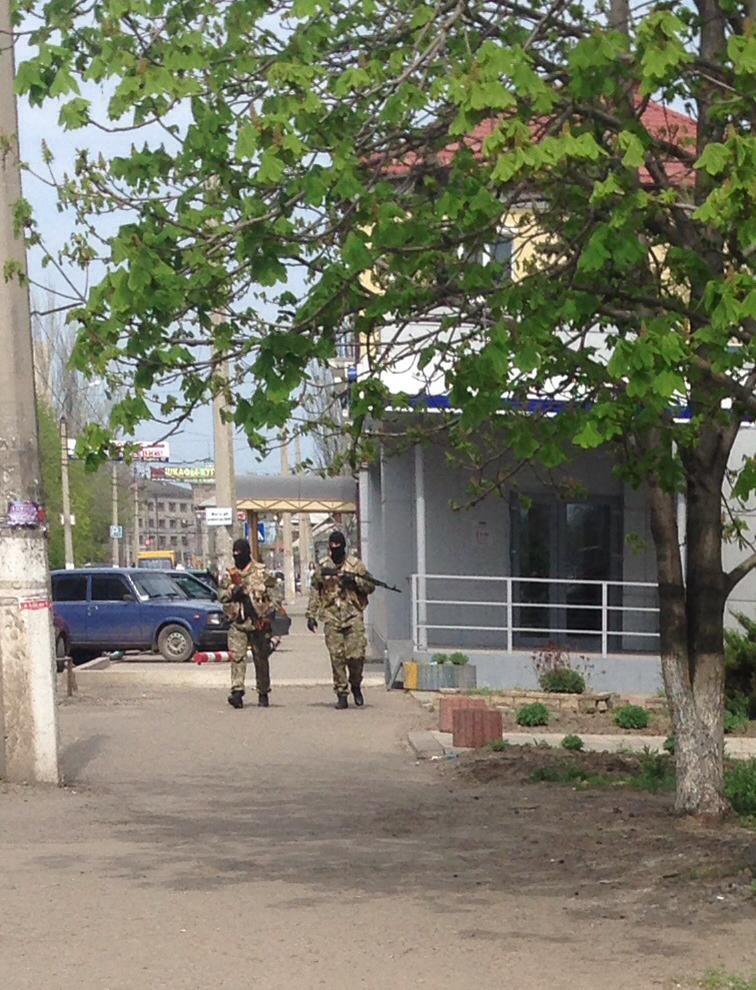
Pro-Russian militants on a Sloviansk street

On June 8, 2014, during a Pentecost service, members of the Russian Orthodox Army took four church members to an unknown destination:

- Volodymyr Olexandrovych Velychko (Ukrainian: Володимир Олександрович Величко, Russian: Владимир Александрович Величко), born in 1973, a married father of eight
- Viktor Ivanovych Bradarskiy (Ukrainian: Віктор Іванович Брадарський, Russian: Виктор Иванович Брадарский), born in 1974, a married father of three
- Ruvym Olexandrovych Pavenko (Ukrainian: Рувим Олександрович Павенко, Russian: Рувим Александрович Павенко), born in 1984, the son of a pastor
- Albert Olexandrovych Pavenko (Ukrainian: Альберт Олександрович Павенко, Russian: Альберт Александрович Павенко), born in 1990, the married son of a pastor

The paramilitary troops may have planned to capture the senior pastor (who was not at the church), and seized four cars belonging to the men. The detainees were charged with a "crime against the DPR", support of the Ukrainian army. The perpetrators were later established to be Oleg Obraztsov from Makiivka, Andrey Chernishov and Yevgeniy Pushkov from Slovyansk. After murdering the priests the three also collected ransom from their families promising their release.

They were detained in the basement of the city's fire department. Slavyansk's deputy prosecutor, who escaped from DPR captivity, testified that he heard cries from detainees who were tortured during interrogation.

At 3 am on June 9, the four detainees were ordered to get into a car and were driven toward Mount Karachun; they were followed by two cars containing militants. About 4 am, the car with the detainees was shot by the rebels; it is believed that to hide the extent to which the men were tortured, the car was burned. Ministry of Internal Affairs advisor Anton Gerashchenko theorized that the attackers were trying to make it appear that the detainees were killed by Ukrainian military mortar fire.

Sloviansk deputy mayor for humanitarian affairs Freedon Vekua (Ukrainian: Фрідон Векуа, Russian: Фридон Векуа) announced the deaths that morning at a closed meeting of DPR leaders. According to Anton Gerashchenko, rebel leader Igor Strelkov condemned the murders and their perpetrators were reprimanded.

Bradarskiy's widow, Natalia, said that on June 10 she was told by Sloviansk police that her husband was among the detainees and she could provide him food and medicine. She said that a rebel spokesperson told her that the detainees were digging trenches near the village of Semenovka (a Kramatorsk suburb) and would be released soon. In early July, relatives of the detainees reported that the four men had been released.

According to Yulia Gorbunova (Ukrainian: Юлія Горбунова, Russian: Юлия Горбунова‘) of Human Rights Watch, local residents said that the bodies of unidentified people were brought to the morgue; they remained until June 11, when they were buried in a mass grave. Anton Gerashchenko said that the burned car was later identified as Bradarskiy's. The rest of the detainees' cars were seized by rebels and driven out of Sloviansk during the withdrawal of DPR forces. On July 7, after Sloviansk was again controlled by Ukrainian forces, Minister of Internal Affairs Arsen Avakov and deputy Vasyl Pascal (Ukrainian: Василь Паскаль, Russian: Василий Паскаль) arrived in the city. Natalia Bradarskaya asked them to help her find the missing men.

A week later, Gerashchenko said that bodies exhumed from the mass grave had signs of torture and abuse. Among the 14 bodies were the Pavenko brothers and Bradarsky, identified by their clothing; Velichko's charred body was later identified by DNA profiling. The bodies were reburied where they were found, near a children's hospital, on July 20 after the identification process was completed.

== Media coverage ==
Christian Science Monitor correspondent Scott Peterson said that the killers were not Ukrainians, but pro-Russian separatists.

== Causes ==
According to Minister of Internal Affairs advisor Anton Herashchenko, the murdered men were accused of sending food to checkpoints of the Armed Forces of Ukraine (AFU) and the National Guard, and suspected of informing the Ukrainian military about insurgent activities. There were rumors that the victims brought chemical or biological weapons to Sloviansk, but their relatives denied that the men cooperated with the Ukrainian army.

Although it was theorized that the men were kidnapped for ransom, church officials believed that religion was the only cause of their deaths. The Pavenko brothers' father was a businessman who owned two factories. Shortly before the abduction, steel was delivered to one factory; this may have been the source of rumors about weapons being delivered to the Ukrainian army.

== Reaction ==
The murders are cited as a prominent example of religious persecution in the DPR. The religious-persecution theory was documented by the Russian philosopher Nicholas Karpitsky (Russian: Николай Карлицкий), who lives in Ukraine.

After the Charlie Hebdo shooting, when Je suis Charlie (French: I am Charlie) spread on the Internet, Ukrainian blogger and public figure Denis Kazansky posted "We are all Protestants from Sloviansk" in solidarity. The slogan was reprinted by a number of media and bloggers.

== See also ==
- Volodymyr Ivanovych Rybak, Ukrainian politician murdered by pro-Russian militants
- Stepan Chubenko
- Volnovakha bus attack
- January 2015 Mariupol rocket attack
- Malaysia Airlines Flight 17
- Izolyatsia prison
- February 2015 Kramatorsk rocket attack
- Donetsk "Donetskhirmash" bus station attack

== Bibliography ==
- Karpitsky, Nikolai Nikolayevich (2015). Persecution of Christians in the Donbas (Eastern Ukraine, 2014) (PDF). К.: Mission Eurasia. ISBN 978-966-96156-9-5.
- Богдан Красовский (2015-06-09). "Годовщина трагедии в Славянске: Чужая религия как оправдание убийства". Деловой Славянск.
- Дмитрий Фионик (2014-08-29). "Восхождение. Кто убил четырёх христиан в осаждённом Славянске". ООО «Фокус Медиа».
