= 2015 Donetsk bus station attack =

Attack in Donetsk, Ukraine

Donetsk bus station attack
- Part of Russo-Ukrainian War
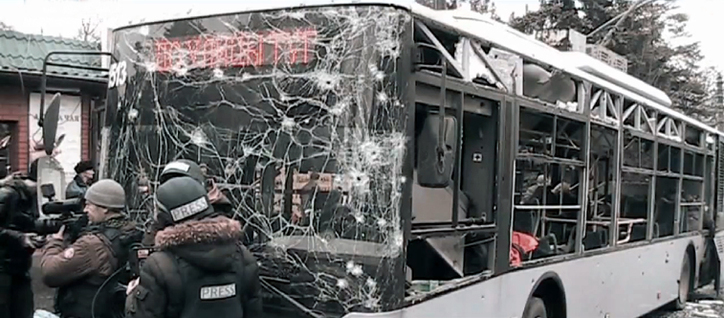
- A trolleybus damaged by the shelling
- Location: 47.95873°N 37.80635°E; Public transport stop "Dongirmash" in Donetsk, Ukraine
- Date: 22 January 2015 approx. 08:30 (Eastern European Time; UTC+2)
- Attack type: Artillery
- Weapon: Medium-caliber mortar shells
- Deaths: 8
- Injuries: 13
- Motive: Terrorist act and false flag operation

The Donetsk bus station attack occurred on 22 January 2015, when long-range guns using mortar shells targeted the "Donetskhirmash" bus station stop in the Leninskyi District, Donetsk, Ukraine. At the time, this area was under the control of pro-Russian separatist forces during the War in Donbas, as part of the early stages of the Russo-Ukrainian War. The incident was classified as a terrorist act.

As a result of the shelling, eight people died and thirteen more were injured. Russian separatist forces took advantage of the shelling as a means to publicly humiliate several Ukrainian prisoners of war.

HRW report determined the bus stop might have been shelled with mortar shells and placed the launch site at max. 7 km to the northwest, in rebel-controlled area.

== Incident ==
On 22 January 2015 at 09:00 Eastern European Time (UTC+2) on the Kuprin Street public transport stop "Zavod Dongormash" was shelled. The first volley fell on the tram tracks, 300 meters from the ring. The next covered the very last public transport stop. The ammunition hit the roof of a shop close by.

According to eyewitnesses, there were four volleys around 09:30 in the morning. People were directly hit, and windows were blown out in the houses nearby. Two people died at the bus stop, two people were also killed in the trolleybus.

Immediately after the shelling, Russian separatist forces staged a "parade of prisoners of war": a column of 17 Ukrainian military prisoners of war, among whom was Oleg Kuzminykh, were brought to the scene of the incident. Video cameras captured militants punching him in the face, and accusing him of a crime. The prisoners were then forced to carry the bodies of the dead.

According to preliminary data from OSCE observers, at least seven people died at the scene, and more than 20 were injured. As of 16:00 on 22 January, the Organization for Security and Co-operation in Europe (OSCE) published data obtained from the Donetsk morgue, stating 8 dead.

Two days after the shelling, on 24 January, observers from Human Rights Watch reported that the sinkholes at the site of the shelling had been filled in by order of the "local authorities", making their examination no longer possible.

== Qualification of events ==
=== Ukraine ===
According to the reports of the Ministry of Defense of Ukraine, the artillery shelling took place at a distance of 15 km from the places of deployment of Anti-Terrorist Center forces. The agency claims that the shelling involved representatives of terrorists who opened fire from residential areas of Donetsk.

Adviser to the Minister of Internal Affairs, Anton Gerashchenko, said on his personal Facebook page that Ukrainian aviation was not used and that the distance of the security forces to the place of shelling was considerable. He also noted that the explosions were from low-powered ammunition. Anton Gerashchenko blamed Russia for the shelling. ATO spokesman Andriy Lysenko said that the nearest ATO forces are in the village of Pisky, and this is beyond the reach of weapons of this type.

The Prosecutor's Office of the Donetsk Oblast qualifies the shelling of public transport in Donetsk as a terrorist act. Criminal proceedings have been opened under Part 3 of Art. 258 of the Criminal Code of Ukraine. The prosecutor's office of the Donetsk region said that they have operational information from witnesses about a truck with a mortar, which, being in the Kuibyshev district, fired artillery in the direction of the Leninsky district of Donetsk, after which it continued to move towards the city center.

On the evening of 22 January, Prosecutor of the Prosecutor General of Ukraine, Vitaly Yarema, in an interview on radio "Era" said that according to the prosecutor of the Donetsk region, nine people were killed and seven were injured.

=== Organization for Security and Co-operation in Europe ===
As the OSCE monitoring group reported, at 11:00 it analyzed two funnels and established that "the projectiles were fired from the northwest direction." The commission also established that "the weapon used in the shelling was a mortar or an artillery installation".

=== Russia ===
A number of pro-Russian resources immediately after the shelling called it a probable shelling with 82-mm mortar mines. Citing a member of a pro-Russian armed formation, they also reported that pro-Russian forces were "looking for a subversive group" and that a plan to intercept garbage trucks and trucks had been announced in the city.

Despite the fact that Donetsk does not belong to the territory of the Russian Federation, on 22 January, Russia opened a criminal case. This was done by the Main Investigative Department of the Investigative Committee of Russia on the death of Donetsk residents.

== Investigation ==
=== Independent investigations ===
Based on the photos and videos taken at the scene of the shooting, several independent investigations were conducted: Livejournal user timberhead and author of the blog Ukraine@war DajeyPetros. Both researchers based on the position and shape of the craters, as well as thanks to a good shot by Christopher Miller, who captured a close-up of the sinkhole next to a phone with a compass, state the direction of shelling from the north-northwest, which coincides with the conclusions of the OSCE. DajeyPetros concludes that the size of the hole in the ground, which is smaller than a phone, indicates the type of ammunition - an 82 mm mine.

The InformNapalm team also drew attention to the fact that local residents reported the mortar shelling that took place immediately before the tragedy from the city quarters, in particular, the likely locations were voiced: "from the area of the Motodrom", "from the area of the toy factory".

== Reaction ==
=== Ukraine ===
- The head of the Ministry of Foreign Affairs of Ukraine Pavlo Klimkin said on Twitter:

The tragedy at the bus stop in Donetsk is our common grief. Peaceful Ukrainians die because of such terrorist attacks. Russia must stop terrorists.

- Prime Minister of Ukraine Arseniy Yatsenyuk placed responsibility for the event on Russia: "Today, Russian terrorists again committed a terrible act against humanity. Russia is responsible for this." The head of the Donetsk regional state administration Oleksandr Kikhtenko condemns the illegal and inhumane actions of the separatists and expresses deep condolences to the victims.

=== Other states ===
- The Minister of Foreign Affairs of the Russian Federation Sergey Lavrov expressed his condolences to the relatives of the victims and wished the injured residents a speedy recovery. In his statement, he also condemned the shelling, and accusing the Ukrainian.

The President of Lithuania Dalia Hrybauskaitė expressed her support for Ukraine in this difficult situation. In her Twitter microblog, she noted that "Ukrainian citizens are paying a high price for the occupation and brutal aggression. Lithuania supports Ukraine".

The US ambassador to Ukraine, Jeffrey Payette, said in his Twitter microblog that he was "shocked by the photos of the trolleybus attack. The implementation of the Minsk agreements can stop the violence".

The French authorities said they were stunned by the shelling of the bus stop. France once again called on all parties to immediately and conscientiously implement the Minsk and Berlin agreements.

=== International organizations ===
At the briefing, the deputy head of the OSCE Special Monitoring Mission to Ukraine, Alexander Hag, said that representatives of the mission are at the site of the shelling and are checking the data. He also expressed his condolences for the placement of weapons in residential areas in Donetsk.

Amnesty International stated that "the mortar shelling of a trolleybus in Donetsk is a violation of international law and should be impartially investigated." The organization also noted that "both sides of the conflict are not taking the necessary measures to protect the civilian population.".

This terrorist attack, together with the attack on a bus near Volnovakha and the shelling of Mariupol, formed the basis of the film "Black January" from the series City of Heroes, produced by Public Television of Azov.

== See also ==
- Volnovakha bus attack
- January 2015 Mariupol rocket attack
- Malaysia Airlines Flight 17
- Izolyatsia prison
- February 2015 Kramatorsk rocket attack
- Murder of Pentecostals in Sloviansk
- Novosvitlivka refugee convoy attack
- Russian-Ukrainian war 2014-2022
