= Rybkin =

Rybkin (Russian: Рыбкин; feminine: Rybkina, Russian: Рыбкина) is a Russian surname.

- Boris Rybkin, Soviet diplomat and spy
- Elena Rybkina, Russian badminton player
- Ivan Rybkin, Russian politician
- Zoya Voskresenskaya née Rybkina, Soviet diplomat and spy, and children's book writer

== Fictional characters ==
- Protagonist of Antosha Rybkin, 1942 Soviet film

== See also ==
- Rybakin (Rybakina)
