= Volodymyr Rybak (politician, born 1971) =

Ukrainian politician

- Володимир Рибак

Member of the Horlivka City Council
- In office November 2010 – 17 April 2014

Personal details
- Born: 30 November 1971 Horlivka, Donetsk Oblast, Ukrainian SSR, Soviet Union
- Died: 17 April 2014 (aged 42) Horlivka, Donetsk Oblast, Ukraine
- Party: Batkivshchyna
- Awards: Hero of Ukraine (posthumously]

Volodymyr Ivanovych Rybak (Ukrainian: Володимир Іванович Рибак; 30 November 1971 – 17 April 2014) was a Ukrainian politician and member of the Horlivka city council, who was kidnapped and then murdered by the pro-Russian militia on 17 April 2014. It was one of the first war crimes to have been committed by Russian forces during the Russo-Ukrainian War.

== Biography ==
Rybak was born in the city of Horlivka in 1971. In 1995 he graduated from the Automobile Highway Institute of the Donetsk National Technical University and in 2002 from the Interregional Academy of Personnel Management.

From 1995 to 2009, Rybak worked in the division of Criminal Investigation for the Horlivka city police. In 2009 he joined the All-Ukrainian Association Fatherland (Batkivshchyna) and the next year headed its city's party cell.

In November 2010, Rybak became a member of the Horlivka city council. During the 2012 Ukrainian parliamentary election, as a Batkivshchyna candidate, he ran for the Ukrainian parliament at the 41st electoral district (the Budonivskyi District of Donetsk) placing 4th with 5,195 votes (4.55%, winner Bobkov Oleksandr of the Party of Regions won the district with 80.85% of the votes).

Rybak was an active supporter of the 2013–2014 Euromaidan protest.

Rybak was abducted by separatists on 17 April 2014 after trying to raise the flag of Ukraine on Horlivka's town council building. Later his body with signs of torture was found in the Torets River, along with other two bodies. According to forensic reports, the victims were drowned, their bodies were covered with burns and stab wounds, and their stomachs were ripped open. The two other victims were Kyiv Polytechnic Institute student Yuriy Popravka and 25-year-old Yuriy Diakovsky.

In 2015 a memorial plaque was placed in Sloviansk after its liberation from Russian forces.

In May 2020 Igor Strelkov, a key organizer of the Donetsk People's Republic's militant groups confessed in an interview with Ukrainian journalist Dmitry Gordon that he bore some responsibility for the killing of Rybak: "Naturally, Rybak, as a person who actively opposed the "militias", was an enemy in my eyes. And his death, probably, is to some extent also under my responsibility".

== Awards ==
- Hero of Ukraine with the Order of the Golden Star (February 20, 2015, posthumously)

== See also ==
- Murder of Pentecostals in Sloviansk
- Stepan Chubenko
- Volnovakha bus attack
- January 2015 Mariupol rocket attack
- Malaysia Airlines Flight 17
- Izolyatsia prison
- February 2015 Kramatorsk rocket attack
- Donetsk "Donetskhirmash" bus station attack
