= Novosvitlivka, Luhansk Oblast =

Urban locality in Luhansk Oblast, Ukraine

Novosvitlivka Новосві́тлівка
- Rural settlement
- Location of Novosvitlivka in Luhansk Oblast Location of Novosvitlivka in Ukraine
- Coordinates: 48°29′41″N 39°30′13″E
- Country: Ukraine
- Oblast: Luhansk Oblast
- Raion: Luhansk Raion
- Hromada: Molodohvardiisk urban hromada
- Founded: 1860
- Elevation: 55 m (180 ft)

Population (2022)
  - Total: 3,648
- Time zone: UTC+2 (EET)
  - Summer (DST): UTC+3 (EEST)
- Postal code: 94 456
- Area code: +380 06435

Novosvitlivka (Ukrainian: Новосві́тлівка; Russian: Новосветловка, Novosvetlovka) is a rural settlement in Molodohvardiisk urban hromada, Luhansk Raion, Luhansk Oblast (region), Ukraine. The settlement is on the main Luhansk–Krasnodon highway, between Khryashchuvate and Izvaryne. Population: 3,648 (2022 estimate), 3,711 (2013 est.).

Since 2014, Krasnodon Raion, including Novosvitlivka, has been controlled by forces of the Luhansk People's Republic (LPR / LNR). Following the 2022 annexation referendums in Russian-occupied Ukraine, Russia has claimed the settlement as part of their LNR / LPR.

== War in Donbas ==
The town is strategically positioned such that the Ukrainian ATO (Anti-Terrorist Operations) forces occupied it on August 15, 2014, to try to stop the "humanitarian aid convoy" from Russia to arrive to the people of South-Eastern Ukraine.

The "convoy" managed to arrive at the destination however the battle between ATO and separatist forces continued. The ATO forces used buildings for their defense of the town which provoked separatist shelling of their positions. The photos

On August 19, The coordinator of the Information Resistance group, Dmytro Tymchuk, wrote that "The ATO [anti-terrorist operation] forces (airmobile and mechanized units) continue defensive fighting near the settlements of Novosvitlivka and Khriashchuvate. The district has been blocked with 23 checkpoints and 29 strongholds".

On August 21, journalist Vsevolod Filimonenko wrote that "Fighters of the battalion «Aidar», which controls the village, had to leave their position so the terrorists would stop the shelling of the church. Later «Aidar» returned the full control over this settlement".

The battle continued over the town when, according to the Ukrainian government, Russian tanks of the separatist forces destroyed much of the town on August 30, including most residences.

The Ukrainian governmental forces were defeated in the battle to control the town. "After weeks of yielding ground, the Russian-backed separatists are brimming with confidence following a string of seemingly effortless victories. On Saturday (August 30), Ukraine announced it was abandoning Ilovaisk, a city 25 kilometers (15 miles) north of Starobesheve. Surrounded on all sides over several days, they sustained fire so intense that the government was compelled to plead for a corridor out. "We are surrendering this city," said Ukrainian Col. Andriy Lysenko, a spokesman for the National Security and Defense Council of Ukraine. "Our task now is to evacuate our military with the least possible losses in order to regroup." Lysenko said that regular units of the military had also been ordered to retreat from Novosvitlivka and Khryashchuvate, two towns on the main road between the Russian border and Luhansk, the second-largest rebel-held city. Ukraine had claimed control of Novosvitlivka earlier in August."

== Demographics ==
According to the 2001 census, the population of the settlement was 3610. 54.43% reported that their native language was Ukrainian, whilst 45.10% said that it was Russian.

== Gallery ==
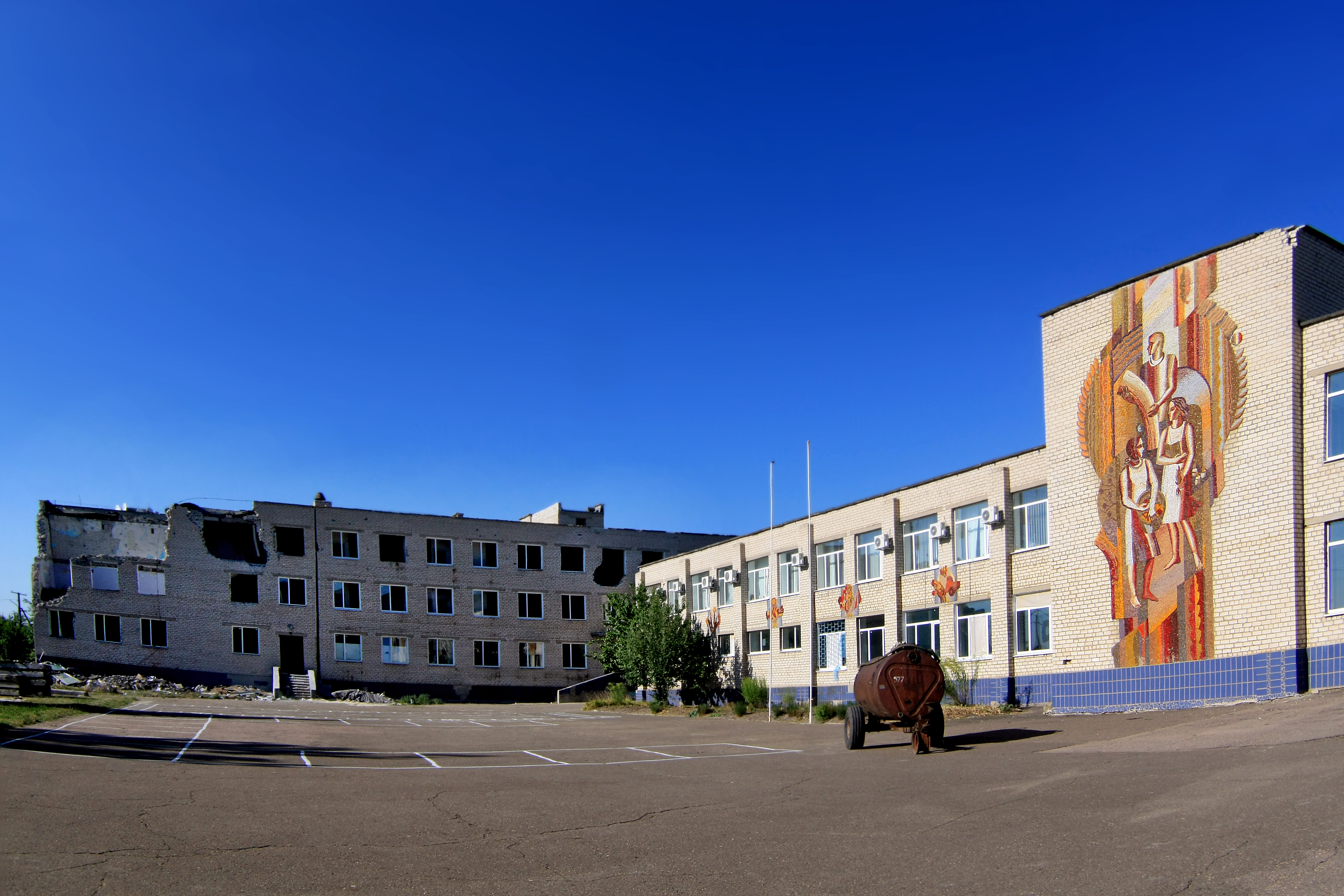
Novosvitlivka professional agrarian lyceum. August 2015

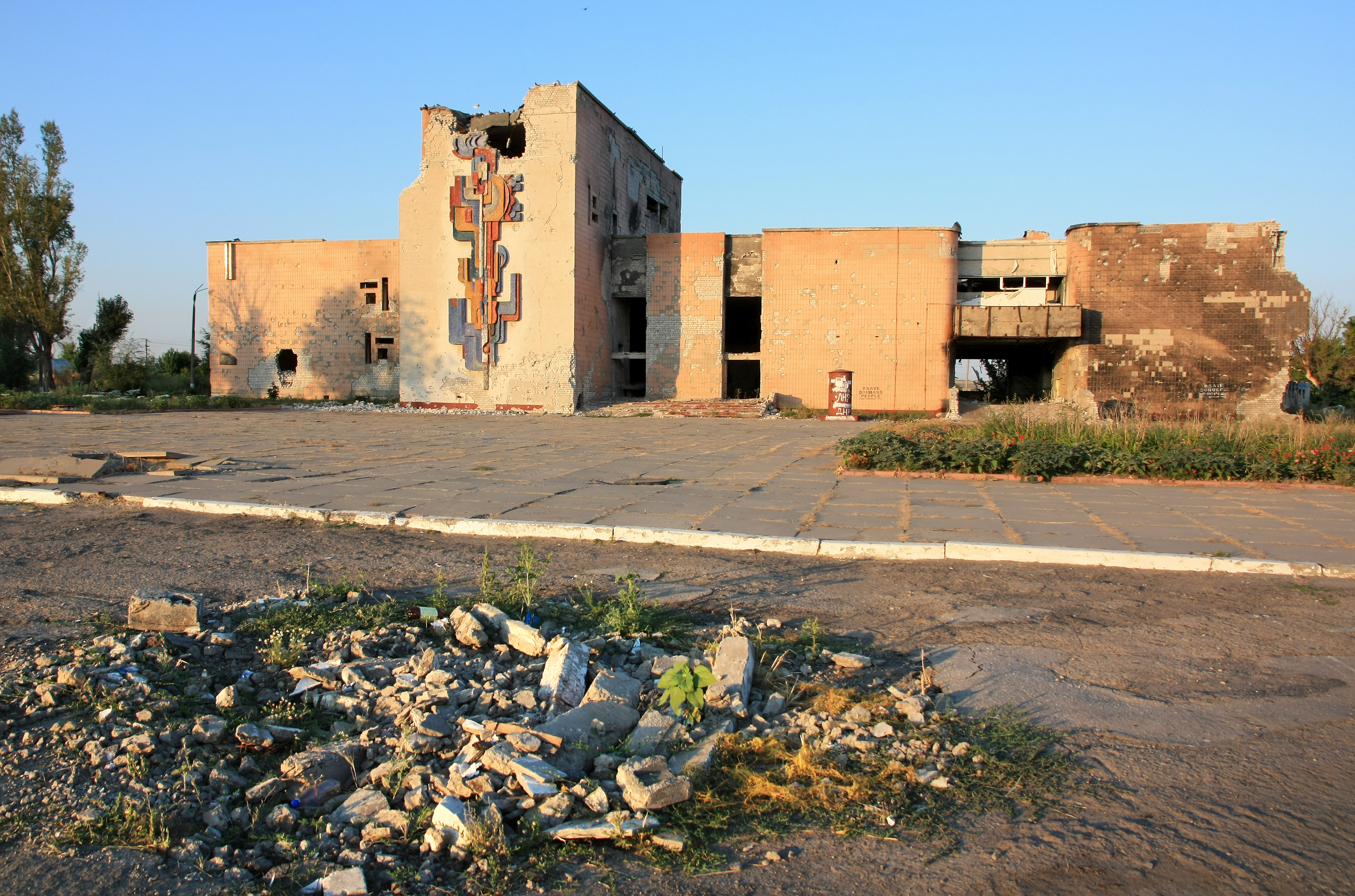
House of Culture in Novosvitlivka 2015-08-09

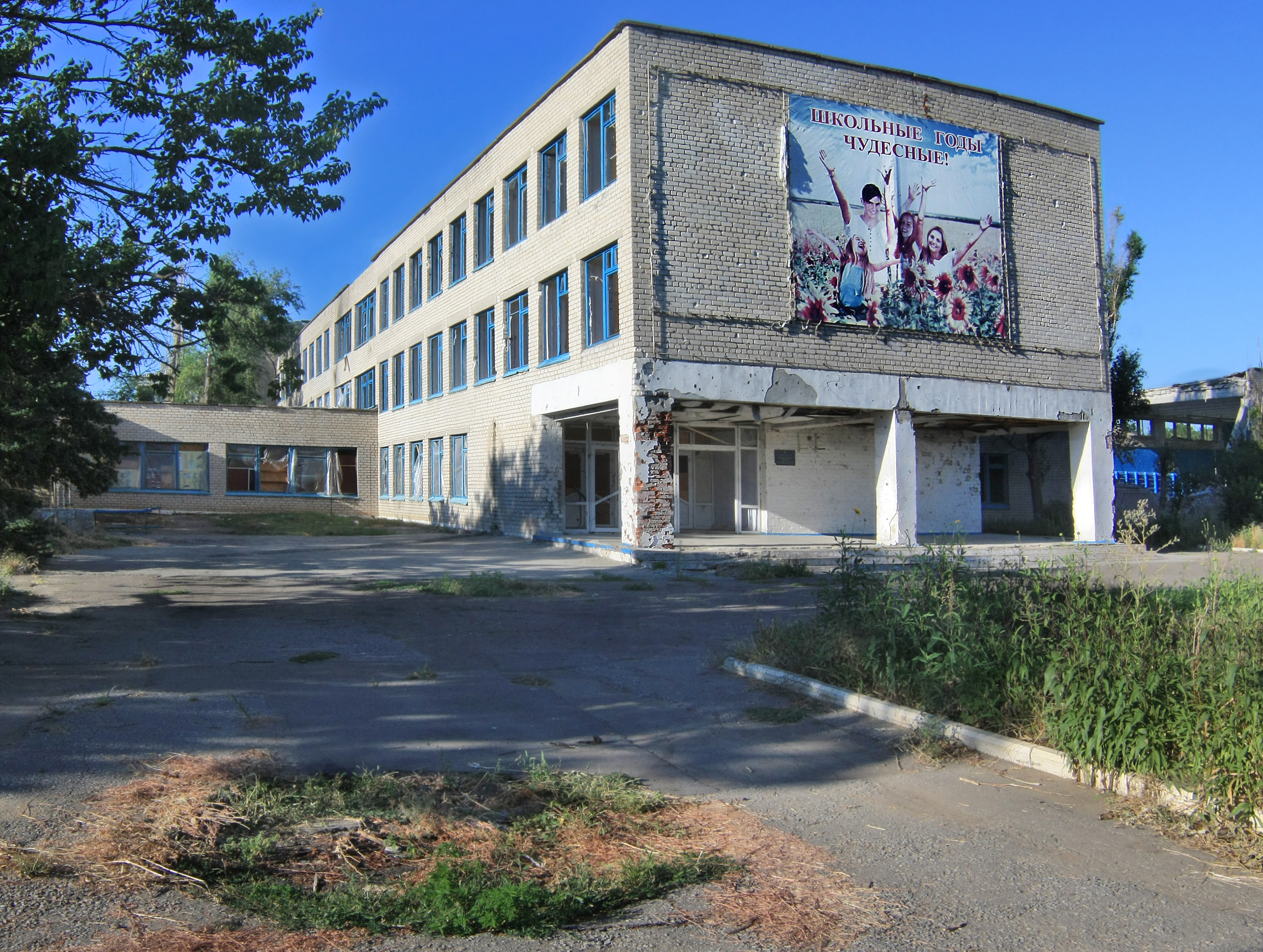
Ruined gymnasium in Novosvitlivka 08.08.2015

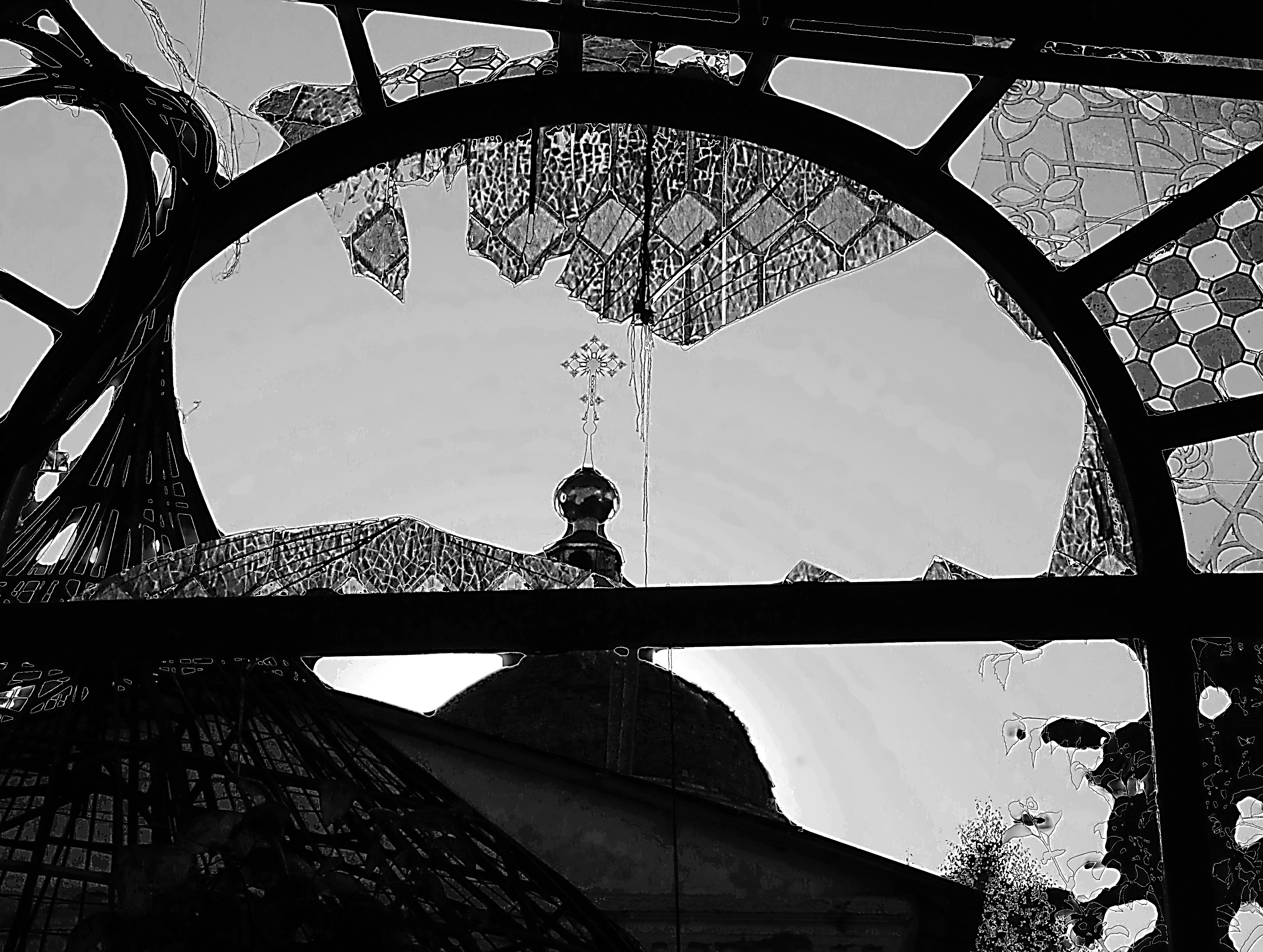
Ruined Church in Novosvitlivka.09.08. 2015

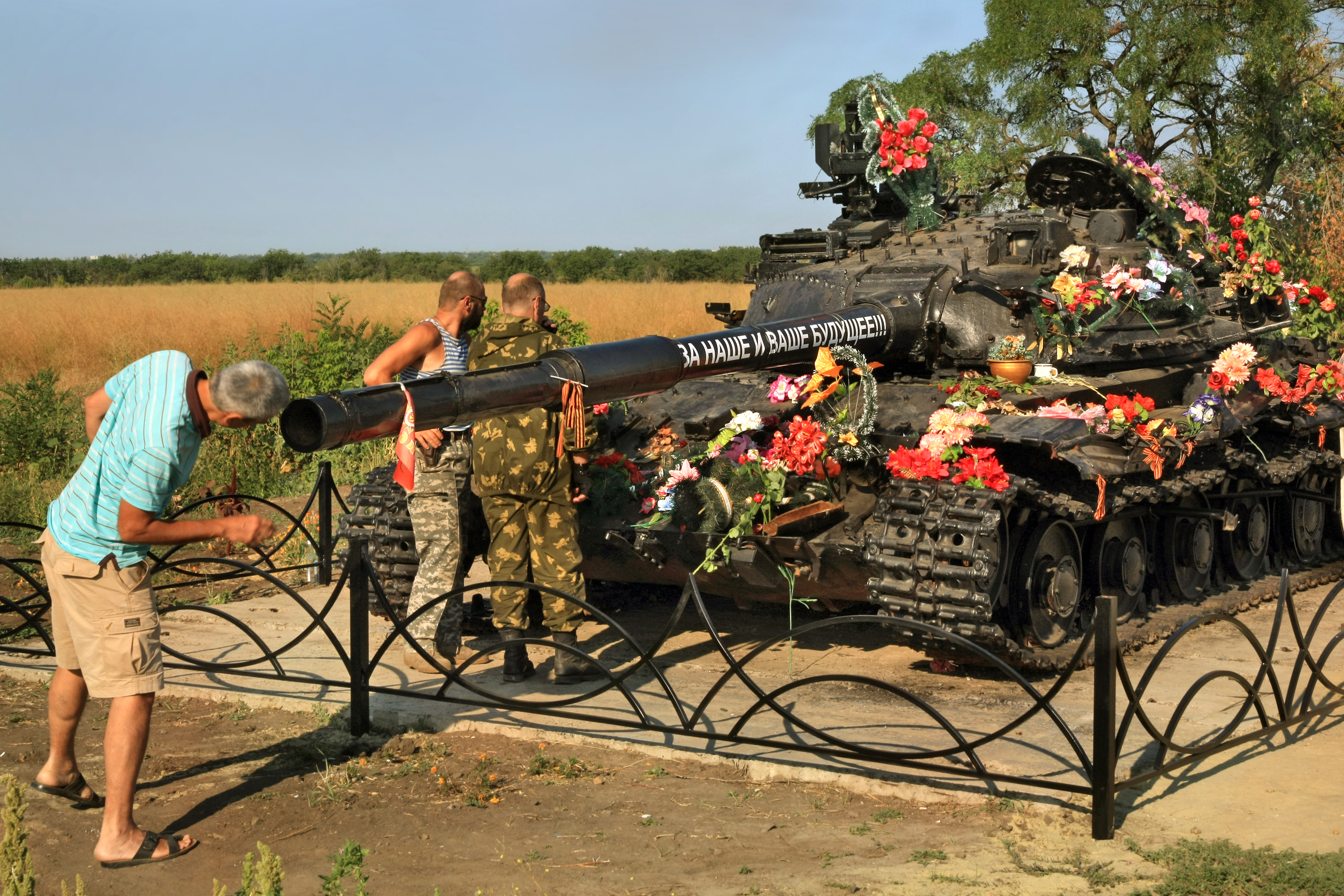
Tank monument in Novosvitlivka
