= Stepan Chubenko =

Ukrainian footballer

Personal information
- Full name: Stepan Viktorovych Chubenko
- Date of birth: 11 November 1997
- Place of birth: Kramatorsk, Ukraine
- Date of death: 27 July 2014 (aged 16)
- Place of death: Horbachevo-Mykhailivka, Donetsk Oblast, Ukraine
- Position: Goalkeeper

Youth career
- Years: Team
- 2014: Avanhard Kramatorsk

Stepan Viktorovych Chubenko (Ukrainian: Степан Вікторович Чубенко; 11 November 1997 – 27 July 2014) was a Ukrainian football player who played as a goalkeeper of FC Kramatorsk. He was tortured and shot by militants of the pro-Russian militia organization of the Donetsk People's Republic for his pro-Ukrainian position.

== Biography ==
Chubenko studied at the №12 Kramatorsk Secondary School, and was fond of sports. At first, he was engaged in the Greco-Roman wrestling. He was fond of football and defended the gates of the youth team "Avangard" from Kramatorsk, and Donetsk, visited his matches in Donetsk, and traveled with the team to other cities of Ukraine. With friends, he organized a team of KVN, which traveled to perform in different cities of Ukraine. Also, with friends, Stepan took care of a children's home in Kramatorsk. They often visited children and brought them toys, clothes, books, and delicacies. Stepan said to his girlfriend that when they marry, they will have one child and adopt two more.

With the onset of pro-Russian forces in Ukraine in 2014, Stepan and his friends took part in rallies in support of the integrity of Ukraine, held in Kramatorsk. The boys brought water, products, and hygiene products for the Ukrainian soldiers who arrived in the city. During the bombing, he helped go downstairs to the elderly, carrying water to them when the city's water supply was cut off. Risking his life, Stepan took out the flag of the DPR from the city square.

In April 2014, when Russian-backed Donetsk People Republic militants seized the city, their mother drove Stepan to her parents in Russia, but a month later he returned, declaring that he did not want to hide "like a rat" in times difficult for the country.

In June 2014, Stepan went to a friend in Kyiv. On June 23, he took a train in the capital to return home. He traveled through Donetsk where he was detained by militants from the Kerch battalion, according to reports, for a yellow-blue ribbon on a backpack, and according to Igor Stokoz, a representative of the Donetsk regional military-civilian administration, because he had entered into a dispute with defending the position of a single indivisible country. The bandits began to beat the juvenile boy in Donetsk. Then he was taken to Horbachevo-Mykhailivka, where after severe torture, he was shot.

Immediately after the disappearance of his son, his mother traveled to Donetsk on his wanted list. She was able to find out that the boy was shot and talked with Donetsk People Republic leader Alexander Zakharchenko, who said he'd find the body of her son and his killers. At the end of September 2014, the mother learned that the location of the body had been found. Exhumation happened on October 3, during which, the mother recognized her son. She succeeded in getting him remains sent to Kramatorsk. On 8 November, Chubenko was buried in his home town.

== Investigation into Chubenko's murder ==
Chubenko's killers were three militants from the Kerch Battalion, containing Yury Moskalyov (born in 1969), Vadim Pogodin (born in 1971), and Maksim Sukhomlynov (born in 1984). Moksalyov and Pagodin are residents born in Donetsk, while Sukhomlynov is from Makiivka. Stepan's mother, Stalina Vyacheslavivna, was told by the DPR authorities that her son's killers had been caught, but two of them managed to escape to the occupied Crimea.

In July 2017, the Prosecutor General's Office of Ukraine asked Russia to extradite the DPR militant, Pogodin, who was one of the militants that killed Chubenko.

I, Chubenko Stalina Vyacheslavivna, mother of the 16-year-old schoolboy Chubenko Stepan, who was brutally murdered and shot by militias of the Kerch militia, turn to the authorities and the public of Ukraine for help. I demand that the Prosecutor General's Office immediately send a warrant to Kramatorsk and further the necessary materials to the Crimea for Pogodin's extradition to Ukraine. If the necessary actions are not taken within a day, I will be forced to turn to the Ukrainian and foreign press and start a protest near the walls of the Prosecutor General's Office. The first document accuses my son of murderers, and the second document confirms his absence on the territory of Ukraine.

— Stepan Chubenko's mother, Stalina Chubenko asking for help to the authorities and Ukrainians on 19 July 2017.

On 10 November 2017, the Toretsk City Court handed down a sentence in absentia to the suspects in Chubenko's murder. Pogodin, a former commander of the Kerch Battalion, and his militants Moskalyov, and Sukhomlinov were sentenced to life in prison in absentia. The court also upheld a civil lawsuit filed by Stalina Chubenko, according to which each of the convicts must pay ₴1 million in compensation.

In November 2017, Pogodin, Moskalyov and Sukhomlynov were sentenced to life imprisonment in absentia by the Dzerzhynskyi court. «As part of investigation of criminal proceedings according to item 3, 12 h. 2 Art. 115 (premeditated murder of a kidnapped person, committed by a group of persons with prior conspiracy) of the Criminal Code of Ukraine, a number of forensic examinations were conducted and comprehensive evidence of militants' guilt in the audacious and brutal murder of a young man was collected,” said Donetsk Region Prosecutor Yevhen Bondarenko. The two killers are hiding in Russia, with Pogodin in occupied Crimea.

== Legacy ==
In honor of Stepan Chubenko, an annual football tournament is held in Kramatorsk.

On 8 May 2016 the title "People's Hero of Ukraine" were posthumously given to his parents, Stalina and Viktor, his father.

On 21 November 2016, a memorial plaque was unveiled at the school where Chubenko studied.

On 23 September 2017, a memorial plaque to Chubenko was unveiled at the entrance to the Avangard Stadium in Kramatorsk.

Since 2019 publishing house Tempora holds a yearly children literary competition named after Stepan Chubenko.

On 24 July 2021 the 21st Territorial Defence Battalion "Sarmat" named one of its combat vehicles after Chubenko.

A monument to Chubenko was unveiled in Kramatorsk in early December 2021. Kramatorsk sculptor, Ihor Nesterenko worked on the project of the monument. Chubenko was depicted in full length with a ball in his hands, in the form of a team with the emblem of the Kramatorsk football club "Avangard" and with the first number.

=== Awards ===
- Order for Courage 3d class (28 June 2017, posthumously).
- Hero of Ukraine (1 October 2025, posthumously).

== See also ==
- Volodymyr Ivanovych Rybak, Ukrainian politician also murdered by pro-Russian militants
- Volnovakha bus attack
- January 2015 Mariupol rocket attack
- List of Ukrainian sports figures killed during the Russo-Ukrainian war
