= February 2015 Kramatorsk rocket attack =

Part of the war in Donbas

February 2015 Kramatorsk Attack
- Part of the War in Donbas
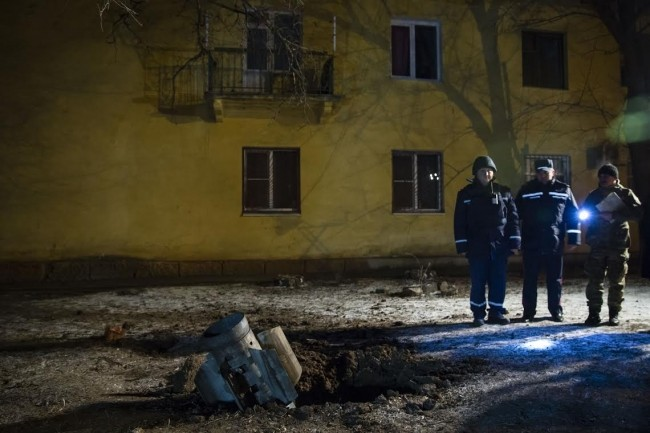
- Petro Poroshenko in Kramatorsk after the shelling

- Kramatorsk (Donetsk Oblast)
- Location: Kramatorsk, Ukraine
- Date: 10 February 2015; 12:30 (UTC+2)
- Attack type: Rocket attack
- Weapon: MRL BM-30 Smerch
- Deaths: 17
- Injuries: 60
- Perpetrator: Russian forces or pro-Russian separatists

The February 2015 Kramatorsk rocket attack was a shelling of Kramatorsk by Russian forces or pro-Russian separatists during the war in Donbas. Kramatorsk was controlled by Ukrainian government forces at the time of the attack. As a result of shelling, 17 people died and about 60 were injured.

According to Oleksandr Kikhtenko, 32 rockets were launched, 18 of them landed in civilian areas, while 14 of them landed near Kramatorsk military airfield, where ATO headquarters were located.

== Background ==
On 10 February at 11:51 SMM OSCE heard an explosion near Kramatorsk military airfield, where ATO headquarters were located. OSCE monitors were able to observe a white smoke trail in the direction of the explosion. It was later reported, that Russian UAV Orlan-10 was shot down near the airfield using Buk missile system before an attack on Kramatorsk started.

== Attack ==
The shelling started at 12:30 and 32 rockets were launched, 18 of them landed in civilian areas, while 14 of them landed near Kramatorsk military airfield.

The rocket attack was filmed by a resident of Kramatorsk.

== Memorial ==
A memorial honouring victims of shellings was opened in Kramatorsk three years after the attack. It was dedicated to the victims of shelling in Kramatorsk, as well as in Mariupol and Volnovakha. The memorial looks like a glass cube with a BM-30 Smerch rocket in it. "How many more people must die?" with a list of names of dead civilians is written on the cube.

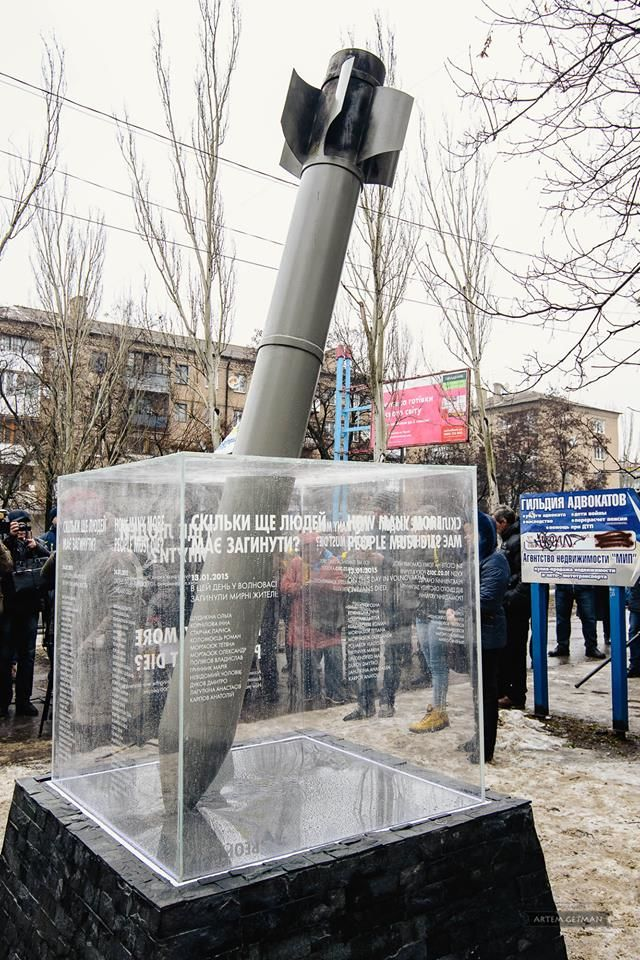
Memorial in Kramatorsk honouring the victims

== See also ==
- January 2015 Mariupol rocket attack
- Murder of Pentecostals in Sloviansk
- Donetsk "Donetskhirmash" bus station attack
- Volnovakha bus attack
- Malaysia Airlines Flight 17
