= Reflection (2021 film) =

2021 film

- Ukrainian: Відблиск
- Directed by: Valentyn Vasyanovych
- Written by: Valentyn Vasyanovych
- Produced by: Valentyn Vasyanovych; Iya Myslyts'ka; Volodymyr Yatsenko; Anna Sobolevska
- Starring: Roman Lutskyi; Nika Myslyts'ka; Nadiya Levchenko; Andriy Rymaruk; Ihor Shulha
- Cinematography: Valentyn Vasyanovych
- Production companies: Arsenal Films; Limelite / ForeFilms
- Distributed by: New Europe Film (world); Arthouse Traffic (Ukraine)
- Release date: 6 September 2021 (Venice)
- Running time: 125 minutes
- Country: Ukraine
- Languages: Ukrainian; Russian
- Budget: ₴31.3 mil. UAH (€1 mil EUR)

Reflection (Ukrainian: «Відблиск», romanized: Vidblysk) is a Ukrainian drama film directed by Valentyn Vasyanovych. Its world premiere took place on 6 September 2021 at the 78th Venice International Film Festival, where it was selected to compete for the Golden Lion. It was scheduled to have a wide theatrical release in Ukraine in 2022.

== Plot ==
The film centers on Serhiy, a Ukrainian military surgeon who is captured by the Russian military forces in 2014, during one of the battles at the Russo-Ukrainian War in Eastern Ukraine. During his time as the prisoner of war, Serhiy witnesses terrifying scenes of torture, rape and various other examples of dehumanizing behaviour towards POWs. Soon after, as a part of a prison swap between Russia and Ukraine, Serhiy gets released from captivity and returns to his pre-war normal day-to-day life only to discover that the horrors that he witnessed as a prisoner are still haunting him. To help fight his post-war PTSD, Serhiy decides to try and fix his relationships with his ex-wife and his estranged 12-year-old daughter Polina, who is suffering from a recent loss of a loved one in the war. As Serhiy spends more time with Polina and tries to help her move on from her loss, he gradually starts to confront his own post-traumatic fears and anxieties.

== Production crew ==
- Director: Valentyn Vasyanovych
- Writer: Valentyn Vasyanovych
- Cinematographer: Valentyn Vasyanovych
- Editor: Valentyn Vasyanovych
- Producers: Valentyn Vasyanovych, Iya Myslyts'ka, Volodymyr Yatsenko, Anna Sobolevska
- Production designer: Vladlen Odudenko
- Sound director: Serhiy Stepanksyi
- Costume designer: Olena Hermanenko
- Make-up: Hanna Lukashenko
- Camera man: Yuriy Dunay
- Casting: Tetiana Symon

== Cast ==
- Roman Lutskyi as Serhiy
- Nika Myslyts'ka as Polina
- Nadiya Levchenko as Olha
- Andriy Rymaruk as Andriy
- Oleksandr Danyliuk as Surgeon
- Andrii Senchuk as Psychologist
- Ihor Shulha as Chief of the Prison
- Dmytro Sova as tortured Ukrainian prisoner
- Stanislav Aseyev as Russian FSB officer

== Budget ==
Film project Reflection won during the 11th pitching of Ukrainian State Film Agency; ₴25 million of state funding was awarded, which represents 80% of the total budget of ₴31.3 million (€1 million).

== Production ==
Reflection was produced by Valentyn Vasyanovych and Iya Myslyts'ka (Harmata Films/Arsenal Films) as well as Volodymyr Yatsenko and Anna Sobolevska (Limelite/ForeFilms). Pre-production prepeartions for the movie took place in May 2020. Filming began in early summer of 2020 and ended in January 2021. In July 2021 film producers announced that they are already finishing the post-production and starting editing the film.

Unlike Vasyanovych's previous feature film, Atlantis (2019) where most of the actors were the actual veterans of Russo-Ukrainian War, in Reflection most of the actors involved were professional. However, to ensure a realistic depiction of the Russo-Ukrainian War, Vasyanovych heavily relied on military consultants, who have gone through Russo-Ukrainian War; one of the better known of the film's consultants was Stanislav Aseyev, who himself spent more than two years as political prisoner in the Donetsk People's Republic's notorious Izolyatsia prison in 2017–2019.

The film is shot in Vasyanovych's trademark series of static, single-frame shots; according to Variety's experts “Reflection” consists of 29 static shots.

== Marketing ==
=== Promotion ===
On August 27, 2021, the film's international distributor New Europe Film Sales unveiled the first international poster for the movie.

On September 5, 2021, a day before its world premiere at the 78th Venice International Film Festival, the film's international distributor New Europe Film Sales released the first international trailer via the industry magazine ScreenDaily; commenting on the trailer's release, the Spanish industry publication Cinemaldito noted that the film's director Vasyanovych was perhaps one the least prominent names in the entire Official Section of the 78th Venice International Film Festival. The Turkish industry publication Filmloverss noted that after winning the main prize - the Golden Tulip - in 2020 at the 39th Istanbul Film Festival, Vasyanovych had been absent from the film festivals for nearly two years, but had now returned to the big screen with a promising new entry Reflection. However, the publication stated that it was unclear from the trailer whether Reflection had enough to win the 78th Golden Lion in Venice.

== Release ==
=== Film Festival release ===
In January 2020, Reflection won the Alphapanda Audience Engagement Award at Les Arcs’ Works in Progress 2020. Later, in January–February 2020, Reflection was presented at the co-production film market at Berlinale Film Festival.

In early July 2021, it was announced that film distribution company New Europe Film Sales picked up international distribution rights for Reflection. That same month, in July 2021, it was also announced that film distribution company Arthouse Traffic picked up Ukrainian distribution rights.

In late July 2021, one of film's producers, Volodymyr Yatsenko, stated that there was a competition taking place between the Cannes Film Festival and the Venice Film Festival for the right to be the venue of Reflection's world premiere; ultimately the latter won and consequently film's world premiere took place on 6 September 2021 at the 78th Venice International Film Festival, where it was selected to compete for the Golden Lion.

In October, the film was presented at 50th Montreal Festival du nouveau cinéma as a part of the Incontournables section.

=== Theatrical release ===
The film was set to have a wide theatrical release in Ukraine in 2022 through its Ukrainian distributor, Arthouse Traffic.

== Reception ==
The film was released in September 2021 to generally favorable rievews from film critics. On the review aggregator website Rotten Tomatoes, the film holds an approval rating of 95% based on 21 reviews, with an average rating of 7.7/10. On the review aggregator website Metacritic, the film has a weighted average score of 85 out of 100, based on 4 reviews, indicating "universal acclaim". At film's world premiere at Venice the film received ten-minute standing ovation.

Leslie Felperin, writing for The Hollywood Reporter, praised the film's cinematography and acting, singling out Roman Lutskyi's performance and saying that the "deeper, more nuanced story [...] about betrayal and redemption, mercy and survival [is] all played out with great restraint thanks to Lutskyi's subtle performance". Jessica Kiang, writing for Variety, praised the film's story and cinematography, calling it "a stark yet soulful evocation of PTSD-in-progress" where "Ukrainian director Valentyn Vasyanovych asks, with brutal austerity, what happens to the soul of a man – and a nation – at war". Kiang emphasized the fact that it is the "tension between the startling and sometimes brutally visceral story each single scene contains and the coolly considered, contemplative manner of its containment — lit in perfectly centered shafts of painterly, Caravaggian light — that makes “Reflection” such a compelling statement on the horrors of armed conflict, specifically here [in] the early days of the still-ongoing Russo-Ukrainian War" and concluded by saying that "[Reflection] is oblique, challenging and, if you're up for it, one of the most intellectually provocative and rewarding films in this year's Venice Competition". Jonathan Romney, writing for ScreenDaily, praised the film's cinematography, calling it "a singularly brutal film from the uncompromising and brilliant Valentyn Vasyanovych". Anna Smith, writing for Deadline, praised Vasyanovych's new work calling it a "thought-provoking film" where "writer-director-cinematographer Vasyanovych presents events in a quiet, matter of fact way, both mimicking the cold detachment of the aggressors and underlining the fact that these [war] terrors do not require sensationalizing". Nicholas Bell, writing for IONCINEMA, praised Vasyanovych's new work, saying "Vasyanovych has an ability [to] goad us into disturbing but necessary contemplation past the final credits of a grueling, beautifully shot film."

After the premiere of the film in Venice in September 2021, the vast majority of Ukrainian film critics spoke in favor of the film. Alex Malyshenko from Bird In Flight praised the film, calling it “one of the main Ukrainian films of the next [2022] year”, but noted that the perception of the film may differ because, according to Malyshenko, watching “Reflection”, you are likely to think of cruelty war and personal choice, about death and life after it, about the Buddhist and Christian concept of the soul and even a little about ghosts “and” for some it will be a pleasant experience of immersion, and some will suffer from long scenes and complex cinematic language.

== Awards and nominations ==
Awards
| Award | Date of ceremony | Category | Recipients and nominees | Result |
|---|---|---|---|---|
| Venice Film Festival | 6 September 2021 | Golden Lion | Valentyn Vasyanovych | Nominated |
