= Volodymyr Yatsenko =

Ukrainian film producer

- Яценко Володимир Вікторович
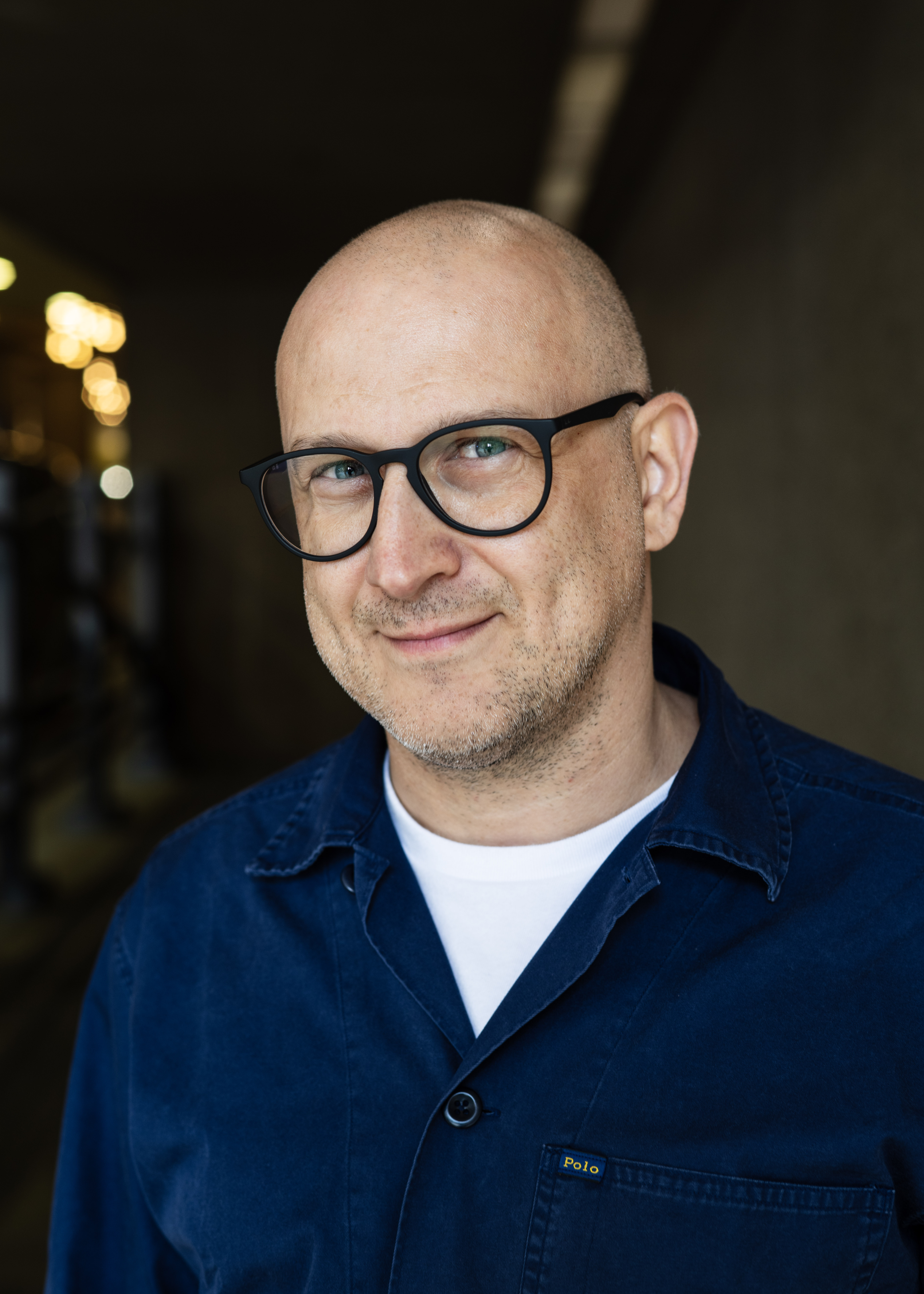
- Volodymyr Yatsenko at the 2025 Toronto International Film Festival
- Born: December 10, 1977 (age 48)

Volodymyr Viktorovych Yatsenko (Ukrainian: Володимир Вікторович Яценко; born December 10, 1977) is a Ukrainian film producer.

Graduated from the Kyiv National Economic University as an economist and the Kyiv National University of Theatre, Film and Television with a degree in producer (diploma with honors); subsequently declared that the second of these universities should have been burned.

== Career ==
In 2000-2005 worked in Moscow, shooting mainly advertising products; in 2004 he was the director of the film "The Night Seller" (director Valery Rozhnov, producer Sergey Selyanov) - according to the memoirs of Yatsenko himself,

One day, Selyanov sent me a script that I really liked - "The Night Seller", gave me $ 300 thousand and said: "Go shoot." I had stars there - Viktor Sukhorukov, Ingeborga Dapkunaite. I grabbed my head - what to do with this money, how to organize everything? We made the film, thankfully. Selyanov arrived only on the first day and then after completion.

Returning to Kyiv, he founded the Limelite production center, which was engaged in advertising filming. Produced and co-produced several short films, including Parents' Day (English: Family hour; 2018) directed by Mariia Ponomarova.

In 2018, he became the producer of the feature film Lodyhin, Yaroslav Alexandrovych [Yaroslav Lodygina; Lodigin Yaroslav Oleksandrovich] "The Wild Fields", based on the novel by Serhiy Zhadan "Voroshylovgrad", - the picture, according to Yatsenko, became a "bold experiment" and collected conflicting reviews. In 2019, he produced Nariman Aliyev's film "Home" - the debut of the 26-year-old director was selected for the "Un Certain Regard" program of the Cannes Film Festival, received the Grand Prix of the Odesa International Film Festival and was nominated by Ukraine for the "Oscar" award. Yatsenko's next production work was the film Atlantis (2019) directed by Valentyn Vasyanovych, also nominated for an Oscar from Ukraine and receiving a number of international and national awards, including the first prize of the Horizons program of the 76th Venice Film Festival (as explained by director, the participation in the festival was due to the work of Yatsenko).

In 2017-2019 Headed the Ukrainian Film Industry Association. In 2019 he was elected a member of the European Film Academy.

Yatsenko sees his main task as the creation of an international brand of Ukrainian cinema.

In 2025, he co-produced To the Victory!, a docudrama film directed by Valentyn Vasyanovych.

== Honours ==
In 2022 he was awarded Order for Courage III Class.
