= Temo Svirely =

Georgian Ukrainian painter

Temo Svirely (თემო სვირელი)
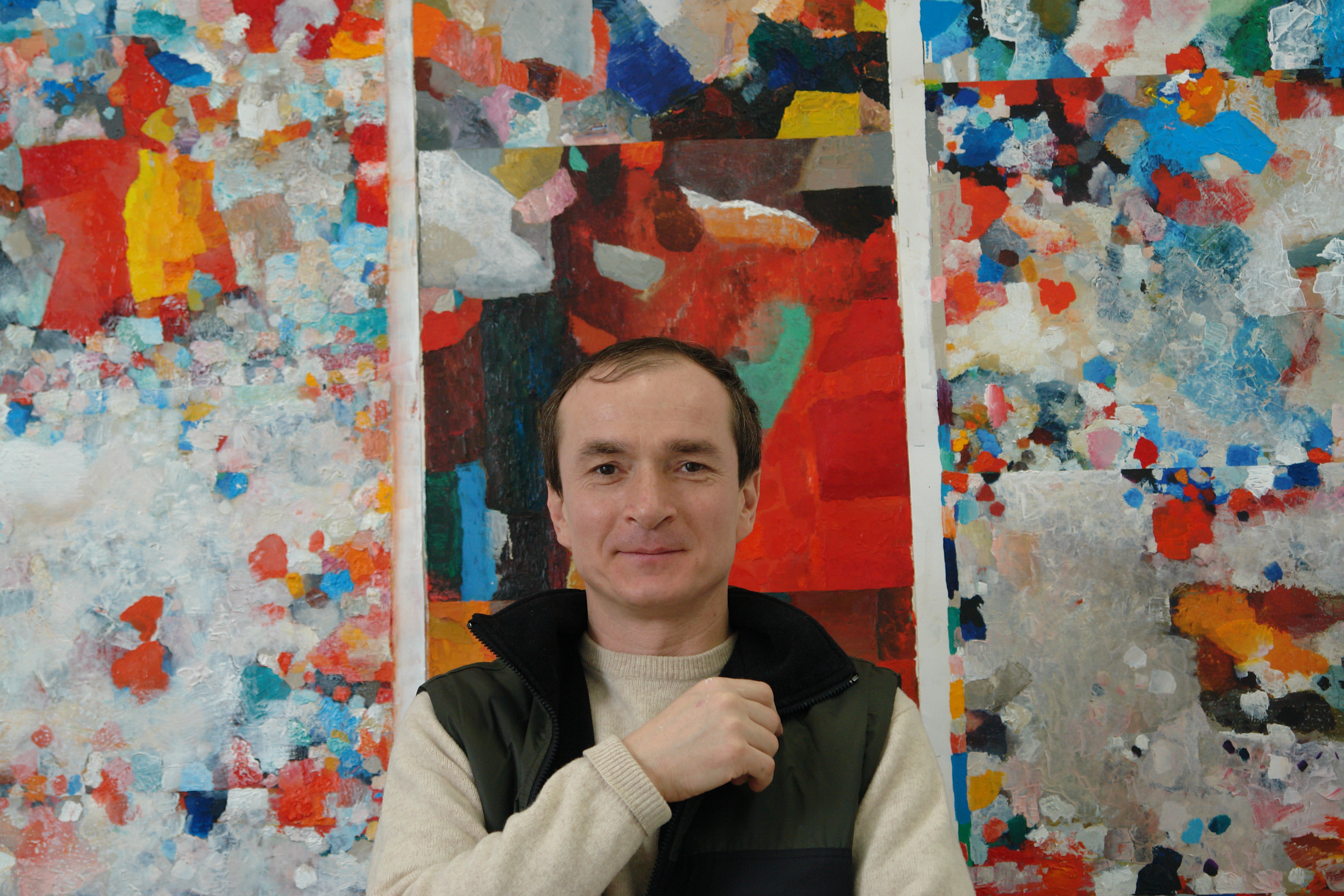
- Born: Tengiz Tskhovrebov; April 21, 1964; Tskhinvali, Georgia
- Died: October 21, 2014 (aged 50); Kyiv, Ukraine
- Resting place: Kyiv, Ukraine
- Website: www.svirelyart.com

Temo Svirely (Georgian: თემო სვირელი) (April 21, 1964 – October 21, 2014) was a Georgian–Ukrainian artist.

Temo worked in various mediums, including painting, figurative and abstract, drawing, collage, print and photo installation, blending traditional motifs with contemporary themes. His use of bold colors and dynamic compositions often conveyed a sense of energy and intensity, evoking deep emotional responses in viewers. "He managed to accurately and clearly reveal the subtle sensations of existence, its pain and pleasure, shadow and light, tenderness and infinity". "The uniqueness of Temo Svirely is in the attempt to express the many-dimensioned world, where the game is condensed into ritual." (Igor Dychenko) "A subtle colorist, particularly in his triptichs. Carelessly playing with colors, trying (in his own words) to turn them into sounds."

His works were exhibited in United States, France, United Kingdom, Germany, Poland, Austria, Russia, Czechia, Spain, Switzerland, Ukraine in Mystetskyi Arsenal National Art and Culture Museum Complex, Taras Shevchenko National Museum, Museum of Outstanding Figures of Ukrainian Culture, Mikhail Bulgakov Museum, National Art Museum of Ukraine.

== Biography ==
Born on April 21, 1964 in Tskhinvali (Georgian SSR within the USSR), he was the son of the football player Guram Tskhovrebov.

He studied painting at the M.S. Tuganov Art School in Tskhinvali (1979-1983) and at the Tbilisi State Academy of Arts (1989-1992).

Temo became a member of the International Federation of Artists of Russia (IFA) in 1993 and the International Federation of Artists of Georgia (GIFA) in 1998. He also participated in the creative association BZH-ART (Ukraine) from 2000.

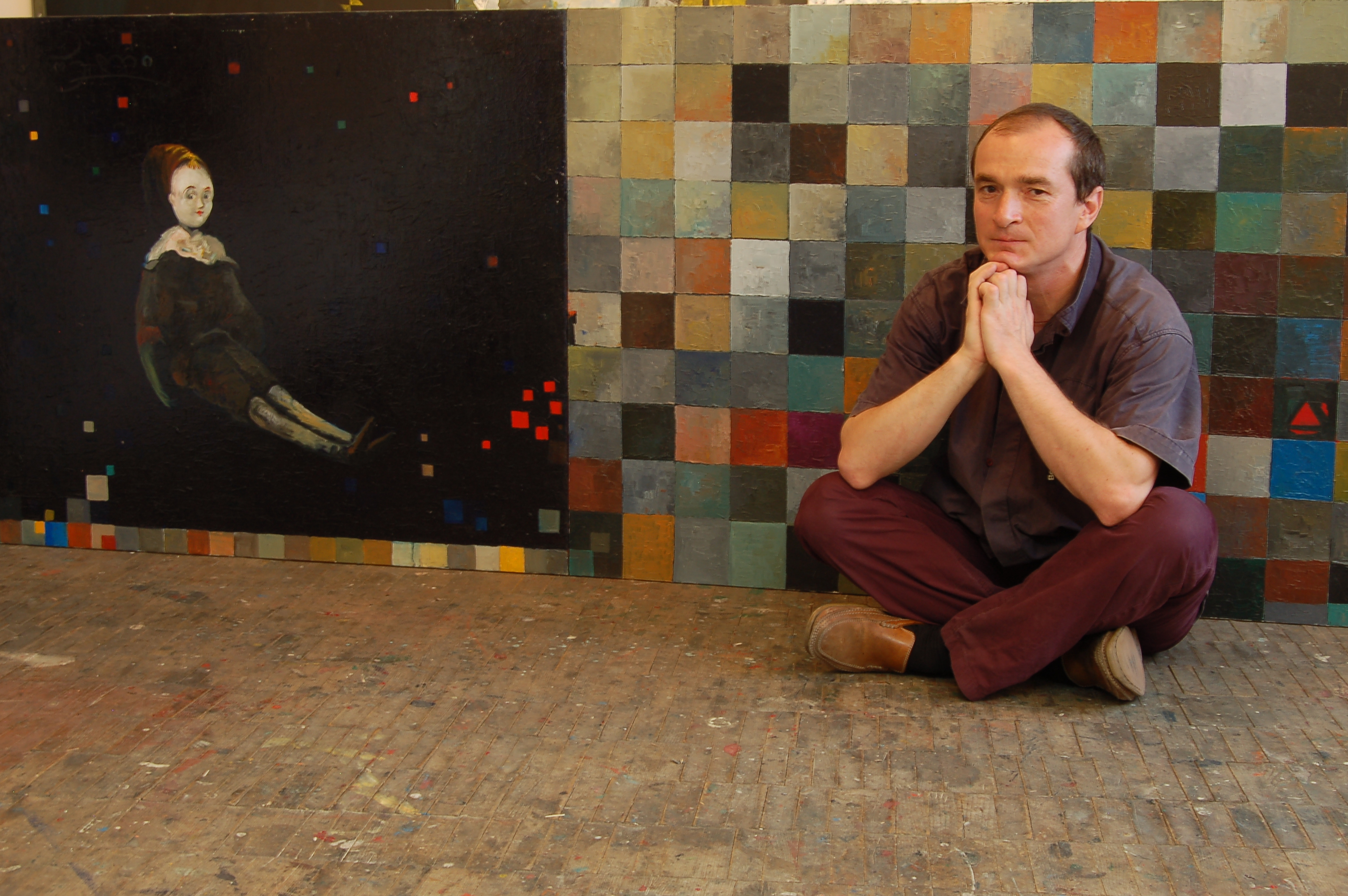
Ukrainian and Georgian artist Temo Svirely in his workshop on Lukyanivska Street in Kyiv, Ukraine, 2007

From 1993 to 2014, he lived and worked in Kyiv, Ukraine.

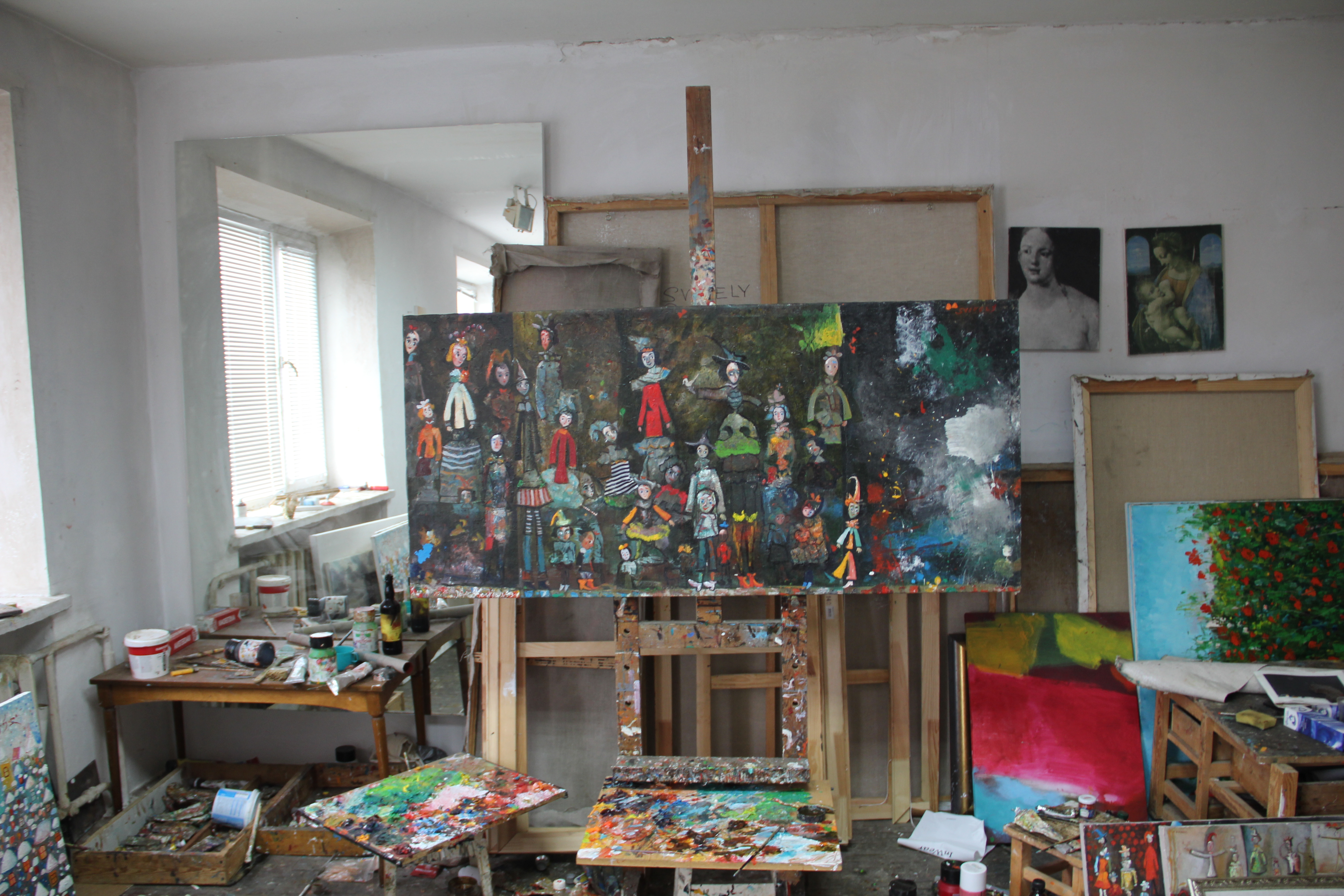
Workshop of Temo Svirely on Lukyanivska 69/71, Kyiv, Ukraine, 2013

He participated in peaceful protests in support of the independence of Georgia in Tbilisi on April 9, 1989, as well as civil protest actions during the Orange Revolution in 2004 and the Euromaidan in 2013-2014.

Temo died on October 21, 2014 in Kyiv, Ukraine.

== Main projects and exhibitions ==
- 2013 - Spring 2013. Tryptych Gallery. Kyiv, Ukraine.
- 2013 - Galerie du vieux Belfort. Belfort, France.
- 2012 - The Dot. Art Kyiv Contemporary VII, Mystetskyi Arsenal National Art and Culture Museum Complex, Kyiv, Ukraine.
- 2012 - The Trident, Boston, USA.
- 2012 - Forms and Metaphors II. Ukrainian Institute of America. New York, USA.
- 2011 - NG Art Fair, Balman Gallery. Newcastle, UK.
- 2011 - Art Plurali Gallery. Odincourt, France.
- 2011 - Forms and Metaphors I. Ukrainian Institute of America. New York, USA.
- 2010 - Vermont Studio Center, Jackson Pollock Foundation Scholarship. Johnson, USA.
- 2010 - Roots and Metaphors. European Bank for Reconstruction and Development, London, UK.
- 2008 - Salon des Artistes Indépendants, Paris Expo. Paris, France.
- 2007 - Sigh of Mars. Attribute Gallery. Kyiv, Ukraine.
- 2006 - Mirror of Senseless Reflections. ArtBlues Gallery. Kyiv, Ukraine.
- 2005 - Looking for Butterflies. Soviart Center for Contemporary Art. Kyiv, Ukraine.
- 2004 - Salt Symphony 1. Artemsil. Soledar, Ukraine.
- 2004 - Street theatre. Triptych Gallery. Kyiv, Ukraine.
- 2004 – 350 years later. National Union of Artists of Ukraine. Kyiv, Ukraine.
- 2003 - Contemplating the path. Ukrainian House. Kyiv, Ukraine.
- 2003 - Invasio. National Union of Artists of Ukraine. Kyiv, Ukraine.
- 2001 - Anixis Gallery, Baden, Switzerland.
- 2001 - Appia Gallery. Grenoble, France.
- 2000 - Homo ludens. City N Gallery. Kyiv, Ukraine.
- 1998 - II International Salon of Contemporary Independent Artists. Drassanes de Barcelona. Barcelona, Spain.
- 1998 - A letter to a friend. M Gallery. Kyiv, Ukraine.
- 1997 - Favorites of the Moon. Kunst Kreise Euskirchen e.v. Gallery. Euskirchen, Germany.
- 1996 - Center of modern art Tuchfabrik, Trier, Germany.
- 1996 - Days and nights in the Unicorn’s garden. Irena Gallery and Children Academy of Arts. Kyiv, Ukraine.
- 1994 - Leaving the stage. Mystetstvo Exhibition hall. Kyiv, Ukraine.
- 1994 - Georgian cultural center Mziuri. Moscow, Russia.
- 1993 - Milky bridge (together with Badri Gubianuri). National Art Museum of Ukraine, Kyiv, Ukraine.
- 1993 - Spring exhibition of the International Federation of Artists (IFA). Exhibition hall on Malaya Gruzynska. Moscow, Russia.
- 1991 - Exhibition of Georgian artists. Architect's house. Moscow, Russia.

== Projects featuring paintings of Temo Svirely ==
- 2015 - "Abstraktgarden", Museum of Outstanding Figures of Ukrainian Culture, Kyiv, Ukraine. An exhibition of abstract paintings by Ukrainian artists, including abstract works by Temo Svirely.
- 2017 - One of the episodes in the Oscar-nominated film Black Level by Valentyn Vasyanovych takes place in Temo Svirely's workshop in Kyiv.
- 2021 - "Colour of old city", Vakulenko art consulting Вечерний Киев

== Projects dedicated to the memory of Temo Svirely ==
- 2015 - «მაისი». Taras Shevchenko National Museum, Kyiv, Ukraine. The exhibition featuring the works of three Georgian artists - Temo Svirely, Gia Miminoshvili, David Sharashidze, is dedicated to the memory of Temo Svirely and named after one of his paintings - «მაისი» - [maisi] - "May".
- 2016 - The performance "Vine". Dedicated to the artist Temo Svirely (1964-2014). Mikhail Bulgakov Museum, Kyiv, Ukraine. Artist Badri Gubianuri, along with other artists, planted a vine in honor of Temo Svirely on April 21, 2016, and shared insights into the ancient Georgian warrior tradition.
- 2016 - "On the other side of the Styx", Kalita Art Club Gallery. Kyiv, Ukraine. Exhibition of graphics and collages by Temo Svirely.
- 2016 - "The Orchard of 108 trees". Dedicated to the artist Temo Svirely (1964-2014). Ukrainian Fashion Week 2017. Mystetskyi Arsenal National Art and Culture Museum Complex, Kyiv, Ukraine. This project seamlessly integrated art and design, featuring a designer skirt with a print of Temo Svirely's abstract painting from Vozianov, alongside an installation of 108 designer lamps and performances.
- 2017 - "Eight Voyages of Van Gogh", Dukat Gallery. Kyiv, Ukraine. Eight outstanding Ukrainian artists (Oleksandr Zhyvotkov, Matvei Vaisberg, Badri Gubainuri, Petro Bevza, Mykola Zhuravel, Serhii Gai, Valery Shkarupa, Oleksiy Lytvynenko) created the interpretations of Temo Svirely's painting "Van Gogh's Journey from Brussels to The Hague" (2011).
- 2017 - "The Yellow Symphony of Temo Svirely". Gallery Master Class, Kyiv, Ukraine. An exhibition of paintings by Temo Svirely. Also within the framework of this project, Ukrainian composer Victoria Poleva wrote music dedicated to Temo Svirely.
- 2017 - Victoria Poleva, "Music for Temo" with the musical premiere performed by the "Virtuosi of Kyiv" chamber orchestra at the "Yellow Symphony" exhibition.

== Art album ==
- Temo Svirely. Painting (2024), Temo Svirely, Future Georgia.
