= The Torture Camp on Paradise Street =

2020 book by Stanislav Aseyev

The Torture Camp on Paradise Street is a memoir by Ukrainian journalist Stanislav Aseyev relating his detention in the Izolyatsia concentration and torture camp in the Russian-occupied Ukrainian city of Donetsk between 2015 and 2017. The camp is operated by the Russian Federal Security Bureau (FSB) and is notorious for torture, rape, and psychological abuse that the prisoners are subject to.

It has been in operation since 2014 and is located on a site that before Russia's first invasion of Ukraine in 2014 served as a factory and contemporary art space. The camp's address is 3 Svitlyi Shliakh Street ["вулиця 'Світлий Шлях', 3'], or, literally, "Shining Path Street", a name left over from Soviet times referencing a Communist "promised land". This was translated into English as "Paradise Street".

== Contents ==
The book is an account of Aseyev's incarceration as well as a reflection on how it is possible for a person to survive such an ordeal. As of 2022 the camp continues to function, although one of its former supervisors and main perpetrators was captured in Kyiv in November 2021, in part thanks to Aseyev's efforts.

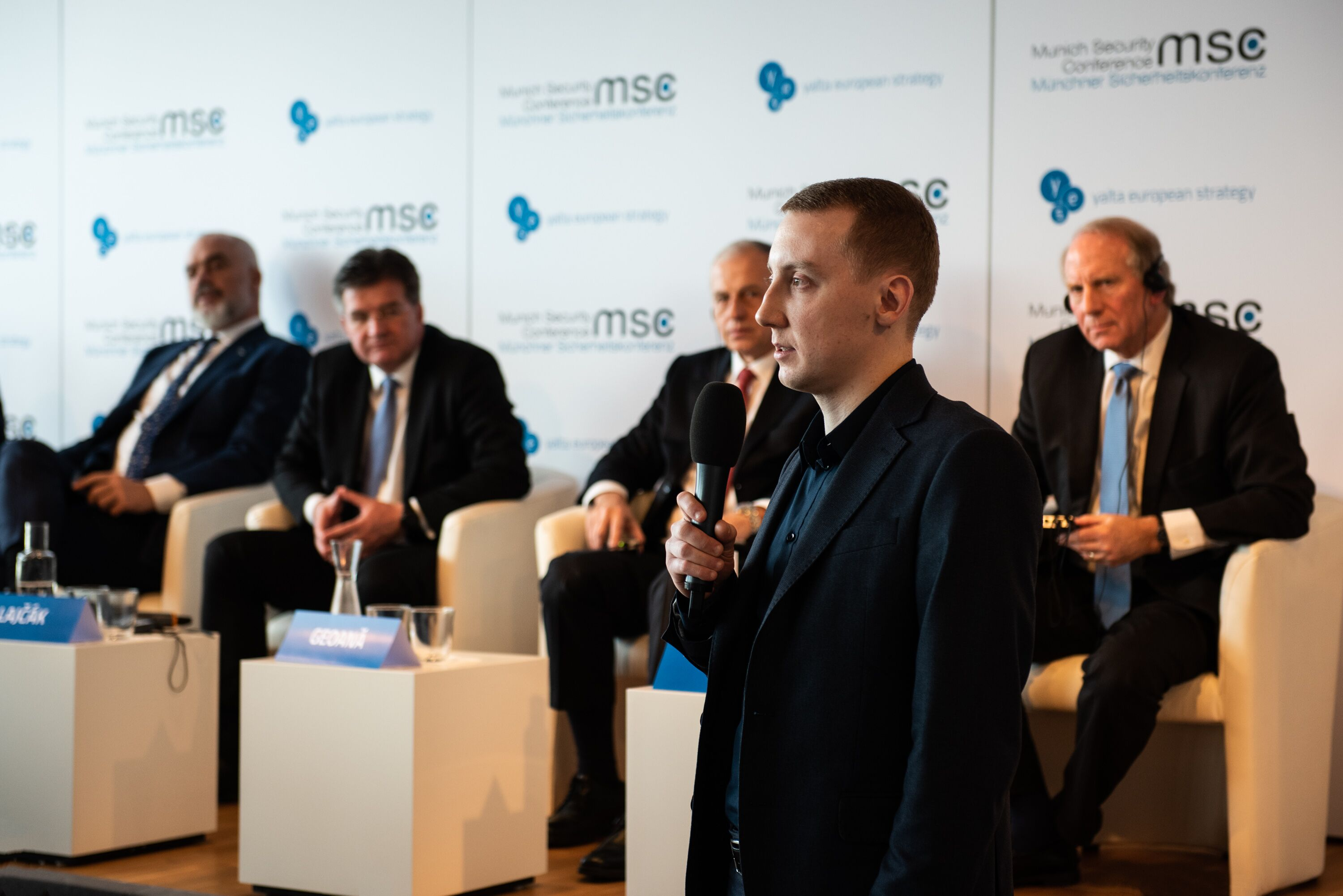
Stanislav Aseyev at the Munich Security Conference

After Russian proxy forces captured Donetsk in 2014, Aseyev decided to stay in the occupied city and continued his work as a reporter for international news organizations under a pseudonym. He was "disappeared" – kidnapped and unlawfully imprisoned – in June 2017 by individuals from the Russian-sponsored "Donetsk People's Republic". One of the crimes he was accused of was putting the phrase "Donetsk People's Republic" in quotation marks in a social media post. He spent the first month and a half in a solitary cell in the basement of DPR's "Ministry of State Security" and then the next thirty-two months of his fifteen-year prison sentence for "terrorism" in Izolyatsia where he was tortured and brutalized. The book describes this experience. Aseyev was recognized as a political prisoner and eventually released in December 2019, in a prisoner exchange between Russia and Ukraine.

The book was published in 2020 and translated into English from Ukrainian by Zenia Tompkins and Nina Murray.

Comparing this book to his other writing, Aseyev stated that after experiencing captivity and torture his writing style changed drastically. In the Torture Camp he wrote "very succinctly and precisely, in small sentences with maximum meaning, without any abstractions, as if writing a military report", unlike in the Melchior Elephant, his previous book.

Lisa Hijari, writing in Critical Inquiry, compared the book to the works of Jacobo Timerman, who was imprisoned and tortured by the Argentinian Junta in the late 1970s.

Aseyev has won the Shevchenko Prize, Ukraine's highest award in art and culture, in the journalism category.
