= Black Level (film) =

2017 film

- Film poster
- Directed by: Valentyn Vasyanovych
- Written by: Valentyn Vasyanovych
- Starring: Kostyantyn Mokhnach
- Release date: 17 July 2017
- Running time: 91 minutes
- Country: Ukraine
- Language: no dialogue

Black Level (Ukrainian: «Рівень чорного», romanized: Riven chornoho) is a 2017 Ukrainian drama film directed by Valentyn Vasyanovych. It was selected as the Ukrainian entry for the Best Foreign Language Film at the 90th Academy Awards, but it was not nominated.

== Plot ==
Kostya, a 50-year-old wedding photographer, experiences a midlife crisis after his father is paralyzed by a stroke and his girlfriend leaves him.

== Production ==
One scene was filmed in the workshop of Ukrainian artist Temo Svirely in Kyiv.

== Cast ==
- Kostyantyn Mokhnach as Kostya
- Kateryna Molchanova as Katya

== See also ==
- List of submissions to the 90th Academy Awards for Best Foreign Language Film
- List of Ukrainian submissions for the Academy Award for Best Foreign Language Film
