= Izolyatsia =

Art centre from Donetsk, now evacuated to Kyiv

IZOLYATSIA Foundation: Platform for Cultural Initiatives (Ukrainian: Фонд ІЗОЛЯЦІЯ. Платформа культурних ініціатив, romanized: Fond IZOLIATSIIA. Platforma kulturnykh initsiatyv) is an art centre created in Donetsk, Ukraine, in 2010 on the site of a former insulating materials factory. Due to the war in eastern Ukraine, the foundation was evacuated to Kyiv in 2014.

== History ==
The Izolyatsia Foundation was established in 2010 by Lyubov Mikhailova, the daughter of the last Soviet director of an insulation materials plant on that territory. After the collapse of the USSR the plant was closed due to the destruction of the whole infrastructure of which it had been part.

During the first years of operation of the foundation, more than 20 art projects were fulfilled. Among artists who worked here are world stars including Cai Guo-Qiang, Daniel Buren, Boris Mikhailov, Rafael Lozano-Hemmer, as well as almost all promising young Ukrainian artists: Zhanna Kadyrova, Apl315, Roman Minin, Ivan Svitlychny, Hamlet Zinkivsky, and others.

On June 9, 2014, the Izolyatsia Foundation's premises were seized by DPR militants who planned to use a bomb shelter and a warehouse on the territory of the former plant. The foundation had to evacuate to Kyiv. Only part of the exhibits were transported; library, equipment, the shop, and works that could not be taken out were destroyed or looted by militants. In Kyiv, the foundation is located on the site of the Kyiv Shipbuilding and Ship Repair Plant on Naberezhno-Luhova Street.

According to media reports, the premises of the Izolyatsia Foundation in Donetsk are used as a prison by DPR militants. In particular, this information was confirmed by the foundation's founder Lyubov Mykhailova and former prisoners of the DPR.

Far-right groups have targeted the Izolyatsia cultural platform for attacks between 2014 and 2019.

== Famous projects ==
2011 — Audio-visual project "Soundproofing" (Ukrainian: ЗвукоІзоляція, romanized: ZvukoIzoliatsiia)

2011 — Program of photo-residences "Partly cloudy"

2011 — Art project "Cai Guo-Qiang — 1040 meters underground"
