= To the Victory! =

2025 Ukrainian docudrama film

To the Victory
- Promotional poster
- Ukrainian: За Перемогу!
- Directed by: Valentyn Vasyanovych
- Screenplay by: Valentyn Vasyanovych
- Produced by: Volodymyr Yatsenko; Valentyn Vasyanovych; Anna Yatsenko; Marija Razgute; Iya Myslytska
- Starring: Valentyn Vasyanovych; Vladlen Odudenko; Misha Lubarsky; Sergii Stepanskyy
- Cinematography: Misha Lubarsky; Valentyn Vasyanovych
- Edited by: Valentyn Vasyanovych
- Music by: Dominykas Digimas
- Production companies: Arsenal Films; M-Films; ForeFilms
- Distributed by: Best Friend Forever
- Release date: 7 September 2025 (TIFF)
- Running time: 105 minutes
- Countries: Ukraine; Lithuania
- Language: Ukrainian
- Budget: €400,000 (US$446,000)

To the Victory (Ukrainian: «За Перемогу!», romanized: Za peremohu!) is a 2025 Ukrainian docudrama film written and directed by Valentyn Vasyanovych and co-produced by Volodymyr Yatsenko. The film tells the story of how war affects families and friendships. It takes place in Ukraine's post-war future. Roman, a film director who’s having a tough time, wants to start making movies again. He lives in Kyiv with his teenage son, while his wife and young daughter are in Vienna, to which they escaped when Russia invaded Ukraine.

The film had its world premiere in the Platform section of the 2025 Toronto International Film Festival on 7 September 2025, where it won the Platform Prize.

== Cast ==
- Valentyn Vasyanovych as Roman
- Vladlen Odudenko
- Misha Lubarsky
- Sergii Stepanskyy
- Volodymyr Yatsenko
- Marianna Novikova
- Hryhoriy Naumov

== Production ==
Around October 2022, after setting aside several initial concepts, Valentyn Vasyanovych chose to write a screenplay inspired by his own experiences and the challenges of living through wartime. He developed the project with support from a Netflix-funded development grant. He was also one of the 48 Ukrainian filmmakers selected by the Ukrainian Film Academy to receive this grant, each valued at US$15,000.

Lithuanian producers, M-Films decided to support the film in a concerted effort to help Ukrainian filmmakers, on a call given by Ukraine President Volodymyr Zelenskyy in his live address to the audience during the opening of the 2023 Cannes Film Festival under the European Solidarity Fund for Ukrainian Films and Lithuanian Film Fund. In 2024 Eurimages funded the project with €70,000 and European co-productions.

The film was made by a tiny team of just six or seven people — all close friends of the director, Valentyn Vasyanovych. They helped each other by acting in the film and also working behind the camera. Vasyanovych called the project “supportive” and said it gave them a “huge psychological release,” helping them escape the stress of war for a little while. In an interview ahead of the film’s Toronto premiere to the Variety, Vasyanovych said:

“It really helped to distract [us] from other thoughts,” he explained. “It was a kind of collective psychotherapy.”

In May 2025, producer of the film Volodymyr Yatsenko presented the film along with other Ukrainian film at the Cannes Marché du Film.

== Release ==
To the Victory! had its world premiere at the 2025 Toronto International Film Festival on 7 September 2025 in Platform section.

The film was screened in 'The Essentials' for its Quebec Premiere at the 2025 Festival du nouveau cinéma on 12 October 2025.

It was screened in Open Horizons at the Thessaloniki International Film Festival on 2 November 2025.

The film was screened in the World Cinema Now section of the 37th Palm Springs International Film Festival and have its United States premiere on 3 January 2026.

In August 2025, Brussels-based company Best Friend Forever got the international sales and promotions rights of the film.

== Reception ==
Writing for Loud And Clear, Roberto Tyler Ortiz described the film as "respectable but somewhat underwhelming," praising its clear vision and precise execution. He highlighted the handheld cinematography and convincing performances as strengths, but noted that "scattered storytelling, underdeveloped characters, and a lack of urgency" prevented the film from achieving its full emotional potential. Despite these shortcomings, Ortiz concluded, "I still quite liked it." Savina Petkova of Cineuropa praised To the Victory! for its introspective portrayal of wartime trauma and emotional fragility. She noted that the protagonist’s attempt to make a film about families falling apart amid war mirrors his own personal unraveling, describing it as "perhaps an act of reparation." Petkova commended director Valentyn Vasyanovych for maintaining "an emancipatory distance" from a project that could have easily collapsed due to the close overlap between cast and crew. In her view, the film successfully creates space to explore "existential crises: of a person, a family, a country and cinema as a whole."

== Accolades ==
Award	Date of ceremony	Category	Recipient(s)	Result	Ref.
Toronto International Film Festival	September 14, 2025	Platform Prize	To the Victory!	Won	
