= In Isolation: Dispatches from Occupied Donbas =

Work about life in occupied Ukraine

- Author: Stanislav Aseyev
- Translator: Lidia Wolanskyj
- Language: English
- Series: Harvard Library of Ukrainian Literature
- Subject: Russo-Ukrainian War
- Genre: Non-fiction, history, memoir
- Publisher: Harvard University Press
- Publication date: 3 May 2022
- Publication place: Ukraine
- Pages: 320pp (original hardback edition)
- ISBN: 978-0674268784
- Website: Book website at HURI

In Isolation: Dispatches from Occupied Donbas is a history and memoir of life under Russian occupation during the Russo-Ukrainian War in eastern Ukraine. It was written by Stanislav Aseyev, translated from Ukrainian by Lidia Wolanskyj and published by the Harvard Ukrainian Research Institute and Harvard University Press in 2022.

== Reviews ==
- Johnson, L., Timms, A., Timms, A., Bacharach, J., Bacharach, J., Kelly, H., Kelly, H., Shephard, A. (13 October 2022), "This Ukrainian Writer Doesn't Need to Imagine Russian Torture. He Lived It.", The New Republic
- Tsurkan, K. (26 September 2021), "Review In Isolation Dispatches from Occupied Donbas", Los Angeles Review of Books

== Publication history ==
- 3 May 2022: Original hardback and eBook edition.

== See also ==
- Timeline of the war in Donbas
- Combatants of the war in Donbas
