= Valentyn Vasyanovych =

Ukrainian film director

Valentyn Vasyanovych Shevchenko National Prize laureate
- Валентин Васянович
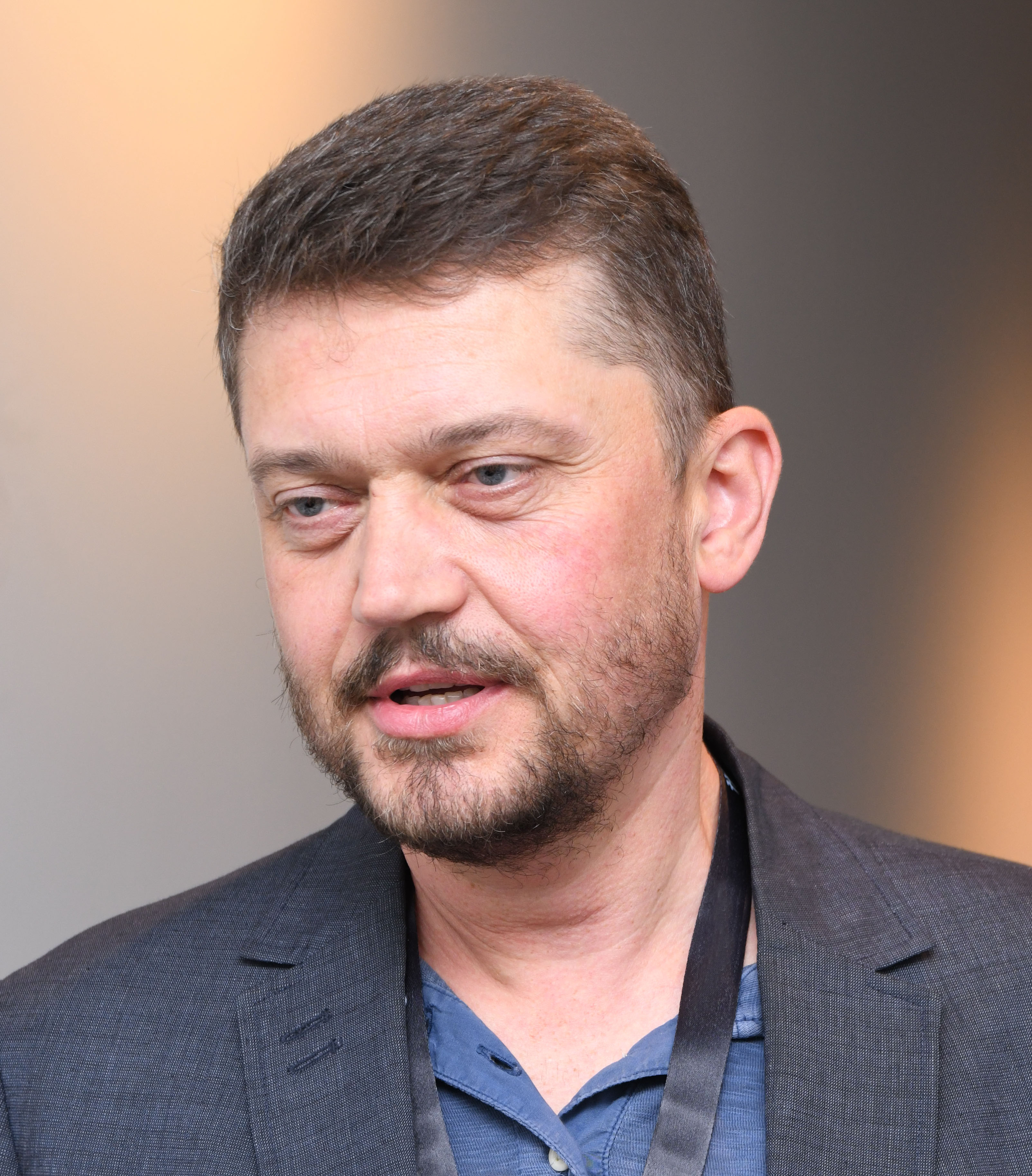
- Valentyn Vasyanovych in 2019
- Born: 21 July 1971 (age 55); Zhytomyr, Ukraine
- Education: Kyiv National University of Theatre, Cinema and Television
- Occupation: Film director

Valentyn Mykolayovych Vasyanovych (Ukrainian: Валентин Миколайович Васянович; born 21 July 1971) is a Ukrainian film director. He is best known for his two films on post-traumatic stress disorder following armed conflict, Atlantis (2019), and Reflection (2021).

== Career ==
Vasyanovych's first film was a documentary short titled Keepsake, focused on his own family. He created it while squatting with other artists in Kyiv in an abandoned building. His first feature film, Business as Usual (Zvychayna sprava), was released in 2012.

His 2017 film Black Level was selected as the Ukrainian entry for the Best Foreign Language Film at the 90th Academy Awards, but it did not make it to the December shortlist. The film tells the story of a wedding photographer who suffers a midlife crisis after losing his sick father and breaking up with his girlfriend.

His 2019 film Atlantis portrayed the trauma of soldiers and civilians in the aftermath of a near-future war between Ukraine and Russia. It won in the Orizzonti section of the 76th Venice International Film Festival; it was also selected as the Ukrainian entry for the Best International Feature Film at the 93rd Academy Awards, but it did not make it to the December shortlist. The film was a critical success, with an approval rating of 97% on the review aggregator Rotten Tomatoes (based on 35 reviews). The film drew a new wave of attention when the Russo-Ukrainian War sharply escalated shortly after the film's release with the 2022 Russian invasion of Ukraine.

In September 2021, his film Reflection was shown in the main competition section of the 78th Venice International Film Festival. The film tells the story of a Ukrainian soldier tortured by Russian forces in Eastern Ukraine, who must find a way to readjust to civilian life after his release. It was picked up for distribution by the Polish distributor New Europe Film Sales.

Variety describes Vasyanovych's directorial "trademark" as a "series of static, single-frame shots". By the magazine's count, his film Atlantis consisted of only 28 static shots, while Reflection contained 29.

== Filmography ==
Year	English title	Original title	Notes
2012	Business as Usual	Звичайна справа	
2014	The Tribe	Плем'я	
2017	Black Level	Рівень чорного	
2019	Atlantis	Атлантида	
2021	Reflection	Відблиск	
2025	To the Victory!	За Перемогу!	Fiction/docudrama

== Personal life ==
As a child, Vasyanovych studied classical piano to follow in the footsteps of his father, a composer and conductor. However, he had little interest in the subject and felt more drawn to photography, another art in which his father tutored him.

In 2007, he graduated from Poland's Andrzej Wajda Master School of Film Directing.

In March 2022, Vasyanovych called for a cultural boycott of Russia following the Russian invasion of Ukraine.
