= Stanislav Aseyev =

Ukrainian writer, journalist (born 1989)

- Станіслав Асєєв
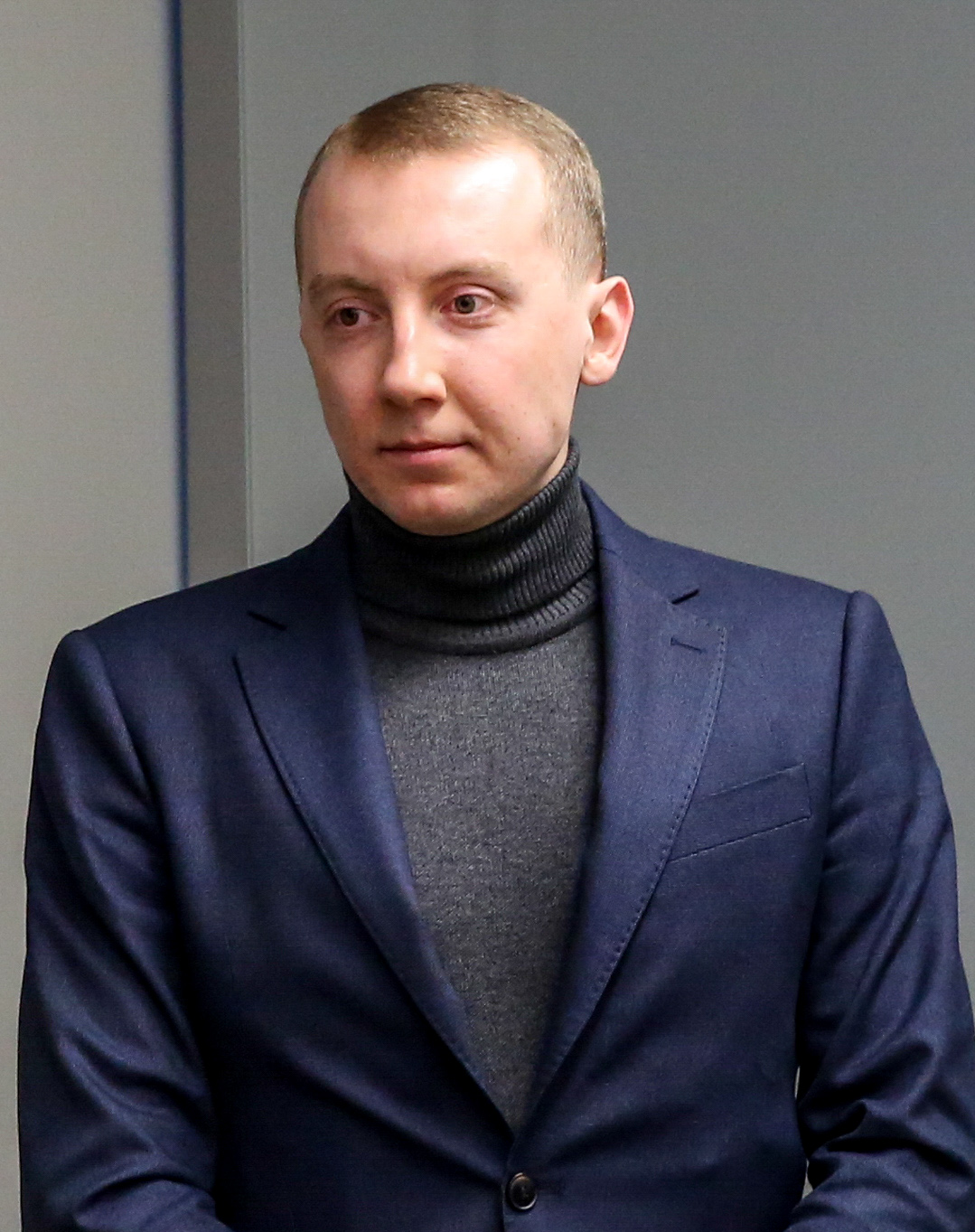
- Aseyev in 2020
- Born: 1 October 1989 (age 37); Donetsk, Ukrainian SSR, Soviet Union
- Occupations: Novelist; journalist
- Writing career
- Pen name: Stanislav Vasin
- Notable work: The Torture Camp on Paradise Street
- Notable awards: Free Media Awards; National Freedom of Expression Award 2020; Shevchenko National Prize; Dianna Ortiz Award for Courage 2023; NNW International Film Festival Award; The Brigade Cross; Freedom Award 2024 Ceny paměti národa

Stanislav Volodymyrovych Aseyev (Note: Also standardly romanized as Asieiev) (Ukrainian: Станіслав Володимирович Асєєв; born 1 October 1989) is a Ukrainian writer, journalist, human rights activist, and founder of the Justice Initiative Fund. Veteran of the Russo-Ukrainian war. His best-known work is the novel The Torture Camp on Paradise Street (2020). In May 2014, his native city of Donetsk fell under the control of Russian militants and he remained there. From 2015 to 2017, Aseyev published his reports (writing under the pen name Stanislav Vasin) for the Mirror Weekly newspaper and other Ukrainian media. On 2 June 2017, he disappeared. On 16 July, an agent of the Ministry of State Security of the Donetsk People's Republic (DPR) confirmed that he was kidnapped by militants from the DPR.

Despite overwhelming international support, Aseyev was sentenced to 15 years and spent 962 days in Izolyatsia prison. He was released as part of a prisoner exchange and handed over to Ukrainian authorities on 29 December 2019.

== Biography ==
Aseyev was born in Donetsk in 1989. In 2006, he graduated from secondary school in the town of Makiivka and started courses at the Institute of Informatics and Artificial Intelligence of Donetsk National Technical University. There, he earned a master's degree in Religious Studies with Honors in 2012.

His philosophical interests included 20th-century French and German ontology.

According to a biography published in Yunost magazine, after attending the university, Aseyev travelled to Paris, where he applied for service in the French Foreign Legion, then came back to Ukraine and tried many professions such as loader, intern at a bank, grave digger, operator in a mailing company, and shop assistant.

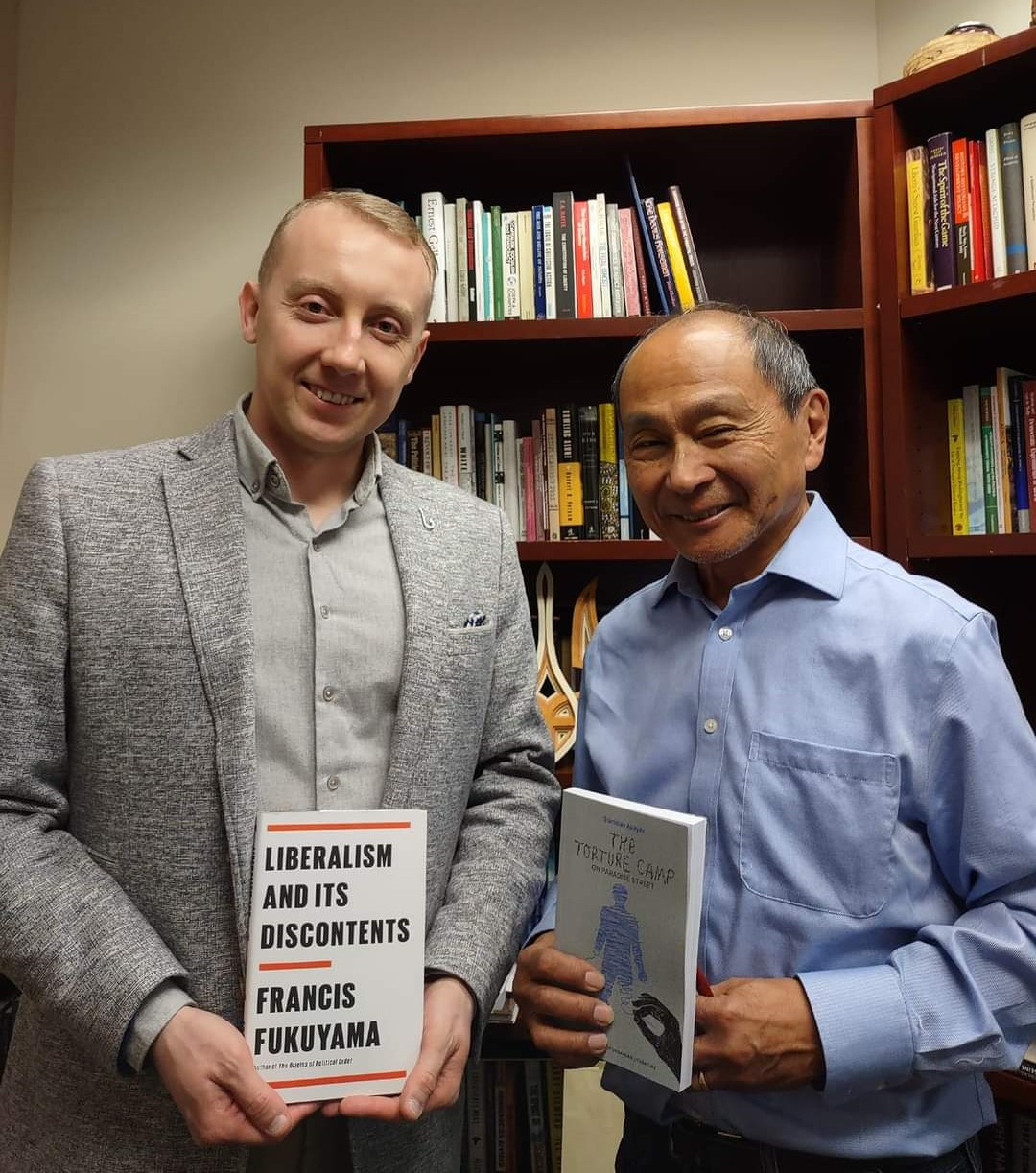
Francis Fukuyama with Stanyslav Asieiev at Stanford University

== Journalism in Donetsk ==
Aseyev had stayed in Donetsk after it was captured by pro-Russian militants in 2014. He described the war in Donbass and his life under occupation in his novel and journalistic reports.

Aseyev used the pseudonym Stanislav Vasin to report from territories occupied by the Russian military and pro-Russian militants. He used the pseudonym due to widespread persecutions by the Ministry of State Security and different militants' groups of the self-proclaimed DPR. Aseyev's position wasn't clearly pro-Ukrainian (he was often accused by commentators of "a lack of patriotism" or "immaturity of political views"). His reports exposing crimes in the DPR consisted of reports of war crimes of the Republic's militants, Russian activities in Donbass, and pro-Ukrainian resistance.

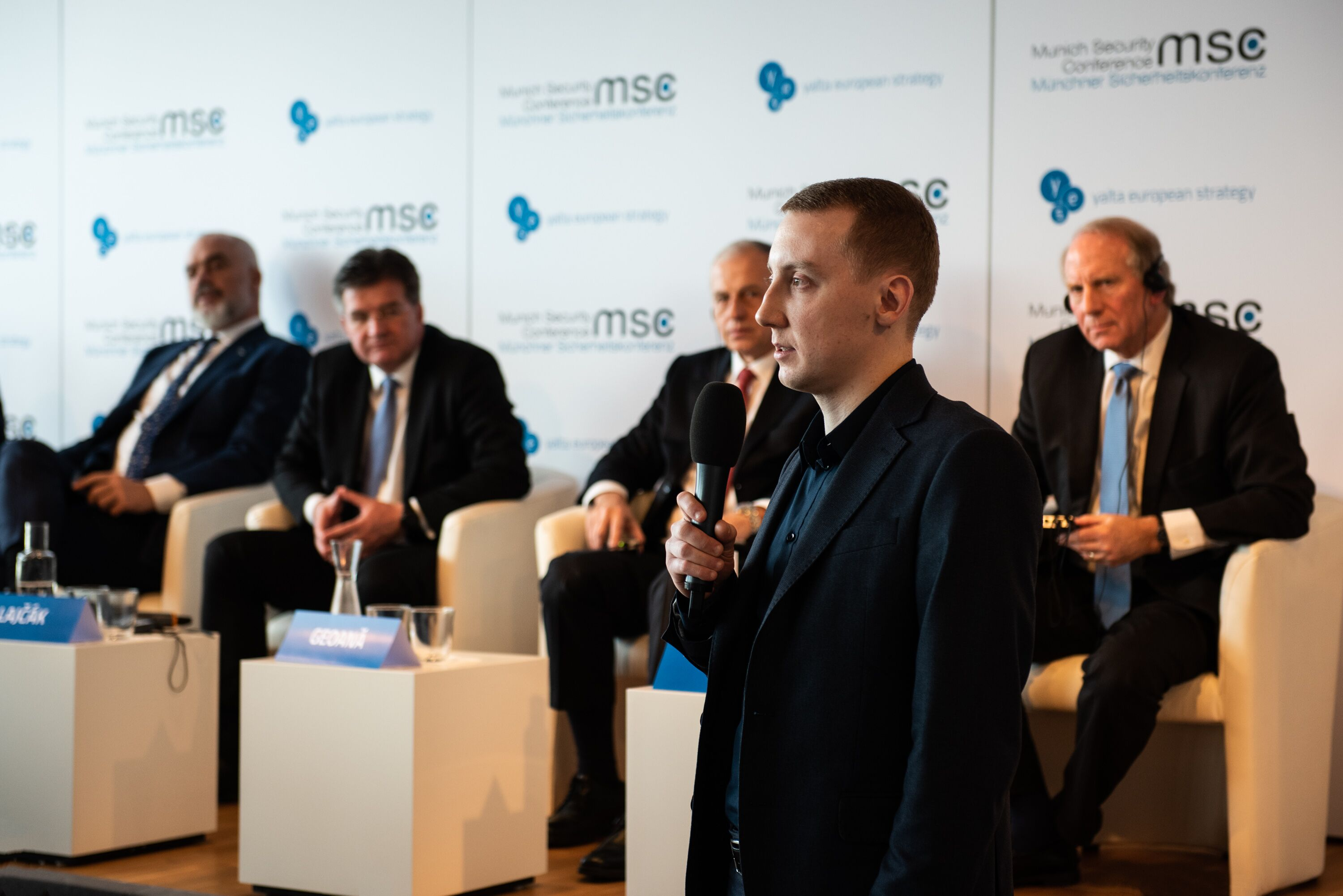
Stanislav Asieiev at the Munich Security Conference

In 2015 his reports were published by Ukrayinska Pravda. Between 2016 and 2017 he was a correspondent of the Mirror Weekly, a notable Ukrainian newspaper where he published 14 articles. Also in 2016– 2017, he wrote about 50 articles and photo-reports for the US government outlet Radio Liberty.

== Kidnapping ==
Aseyev's last report was for RFE/RL's project Donbass Realities, sent on 2 June 2017 (disputable if it was really written by him or, maybe, under pressure of kidnappers). His Facebook page was active for a while but probably managed by another person.

Aseyev's mother (living in Makiivka near Donetsk) visited his apartment and saw traces of illegal entry and search.

His fellow student and former MP Yehor Firsov reported Aseyev's disappearance on 6 June accusing Russia-backed militants of kidnapping. Later this was commented on by Security Service of Ukraine, UN Monitoring Mission on Human Rights to Ukraine, Ukraine Journalists Union.

On 16 July 2017, an agent of the DNR's Ministry of State Security confirmed to Aseyev's mother that her son was in their custody and that he was suspected of espionage. Independent media were not allowed to report from the DNR-controlled territory.

In July 2018, Aseyev reportedly began a hunger strike while being imprisoned.

In October 2019 the Supreme Court of the DNR found Aseyev guilty on charges of organizing an extremist group, espionage and incitement to espionage, and public actions aimed at violating territorial integrity of the DNR; he was sentenced to 15 years in prison. An international campaign, #FreeAseyev, for journalist's release was launched. It was supported by authorities, professional communities and human rights activists, active between 2017 and 2019. Last events of the campaign were held a few weeks before his release on 15 November 2019. People gathered on "Empty chair day" in Kyiv, Lviv, Kramatorsk, New York, Rome and London.

Amnesty International, Committee to Protect Journalists, the European Federation of Journalists, Human Rights Watch, the Norwegian Helsinki Committee, the Organization for Security and Co-operation in Europe, PEN International, Reporters Without Borders and the United States Mission to the Organization for Security and Cooperation in Europe called for his immediate release. The US Senators Bob Menendez and Marco Rubio have also voiced their support for Aseyev.

Stas Aseyev and his less-known colleague Oleh Halaziuk were released (as part of a controversial prison exchange between the DPR, the Luhansk People's Republic and Ukraine) and handed over to Ukrainian authorities on 29 December 2019.

== Political activity ==
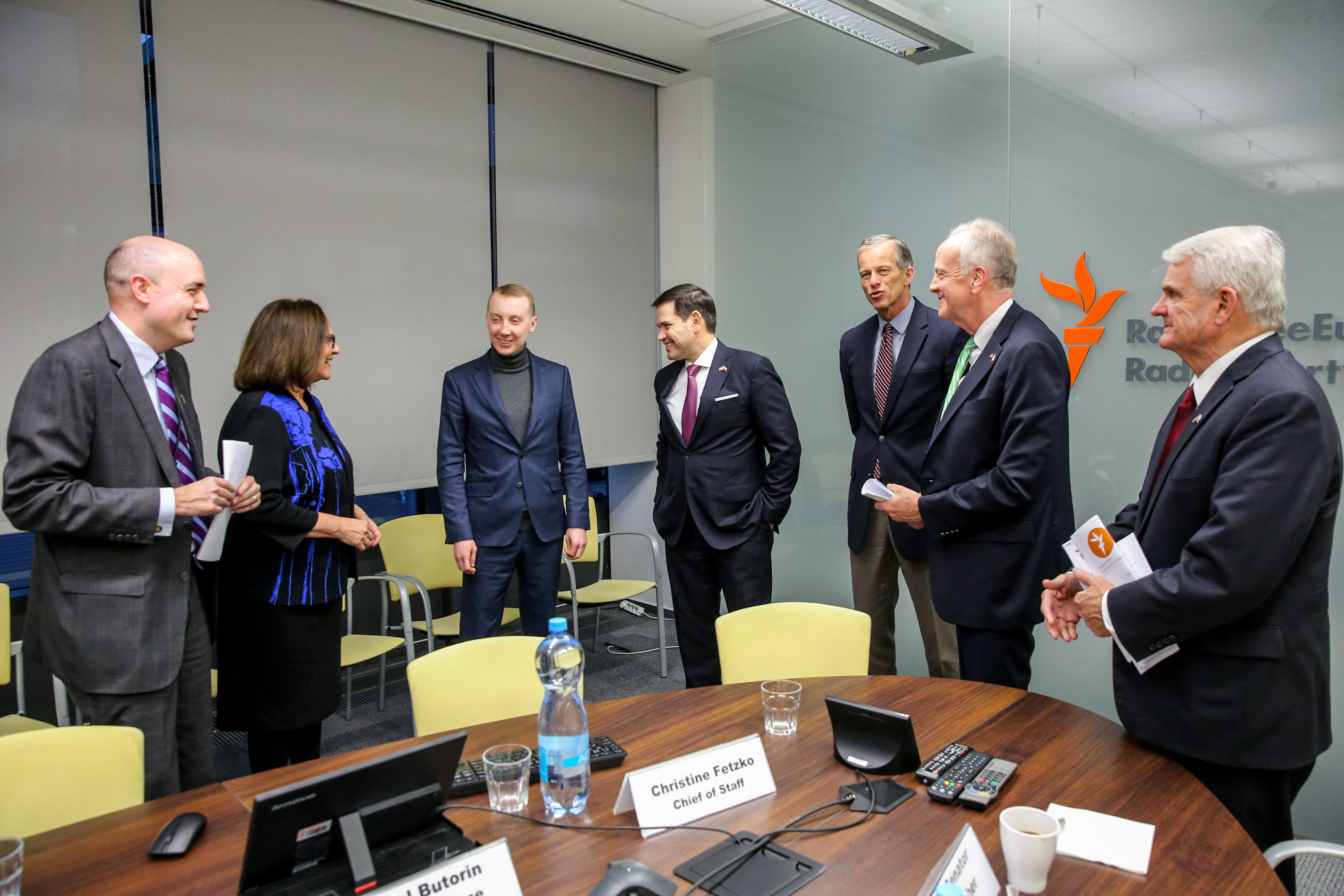
Stanislav Aseyev with American Senators at the Radio Liberty office in Prague

After his release, Aseyev took an active social and political position, dealing with the rights of captives of illegal prisons in Russia and on occupied territories. On 29 January 2020, Aseyev delivered a speech at the Council of Europe in which he asked the member states to put pressure on Russia to release the captives. On 15 February 2020, the journalist spoke at the Munich Security Conference, where he spoke about the inhumane treatment of captives by militants.

On 14 February 2020, Aseyev met with a group of US senators at Radio Liberty's Prague office to discuss the release of the remaining captives in the occupied territories of Donetsk region.

== Palych's case ==
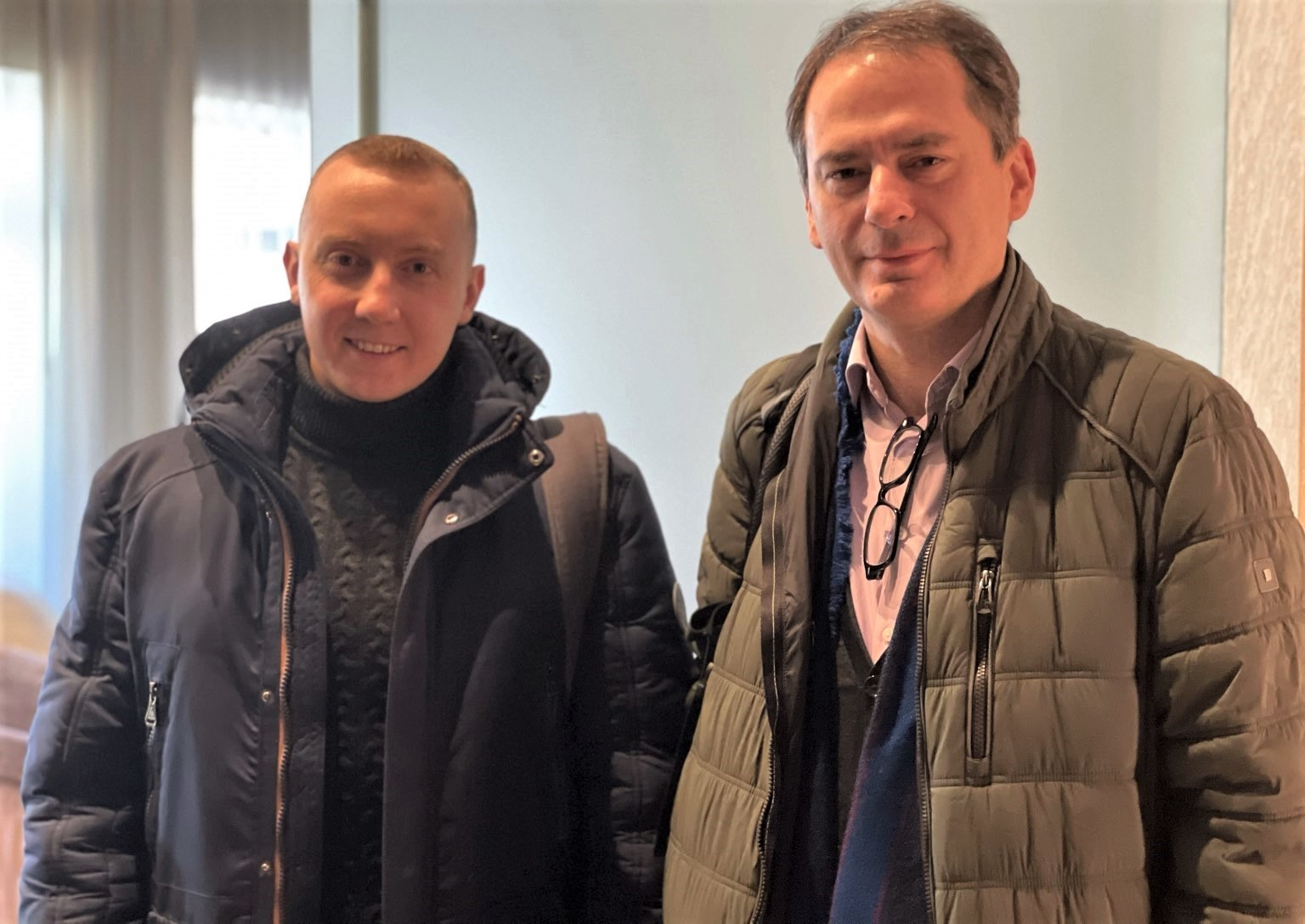
Aseyev with Christo Grozev

One and a half years after his release from Izolyatsia prison, Aseyev found out that the chief commandant of the prison - Denis Kulikovsky aka Palych - was living freely in Kyiv. Together with Christo Grozev and retired Ukrainian special services colonel Roman Chervinsky, Aseyev conducted an investigation that led to the discovery of Palych's address in Kyiv and his arrest by the Security Service of Ukraine.

At the moment, Palych-Kulikovsky is serving a 15-year prison sentence to which he was sentenced by a Kyiv court.

== Armed Forces of Ukraine ==
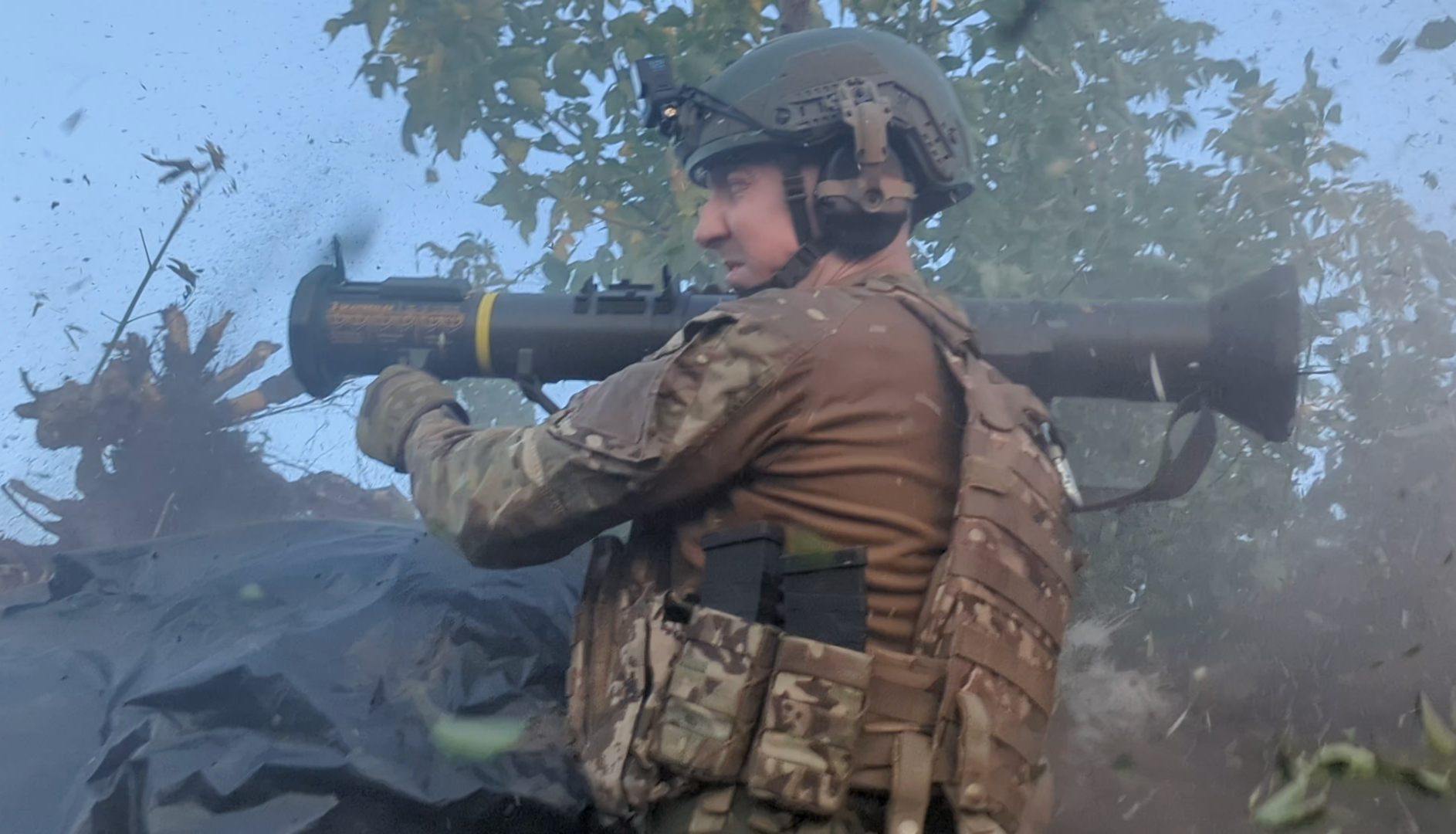
Stanislav Aseyev at the frontline

In 2023, Aseyev joined the Ukrainian Armed Forces as an infantryman. In 2024, Aseyev received a contusion during the fighting in Donbas and underwent rehabilitation in a hospital, after which he returned to the front. Two months later, Aseyev again received a more severe mine-shrapnel wound to his neck and chest, after which he again ended up in the hospital.

In the fall of 2024, Aseyev was demobilized from the ranks of the Ukrainian army based on the fact of his release from captivity. The reason for demobilization was the disbandment of his battalion due to losses and the refusal of the command to transfer Aseyev to the Main Directorate of Intelligence. He was awarded of the Brigade Cross for his service.

== Sednaya prison ==
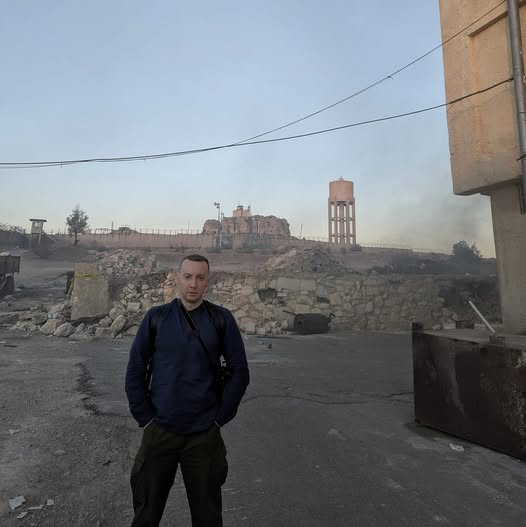
Stanislav Aseyev on the territory of the Sednaya prison, Syria

Aseyev became the first Ukrainian journalist to report from the Sednaya death camp in Syria. He arrived in Damascus accompanied by officers of the Main Intelligence Directorate, who were engaged in the evacuation of Ukrainian citizens from Syria. Aseyev then went to Sednaya prison and made a photo report from there, becoming the first Ukrainian to talk about the horrors of the prison under Bashar al-Assad in the national media.

== Literature ==
Before his illegal capture and imprisonment, Aseyev published a work of prose—the autobiographical novel The Melchior Elephant, or A Man Who Thought (in Russian). It was published for the first time in Moscow in Yunost magazine (#1 — #6, 2015) and the following year it came out in hardback from the publishing house Kayala (Ukrainian: Каяла) in Kyiv. According to Yunost's editor Yevgeniy Malevich: "his perspective is not a journalist-like, nor a writer-like one, but he's a young philosopher. In his novel Stanislav turns himself inside out, showing the world of a small town and the war that tore the country in half".

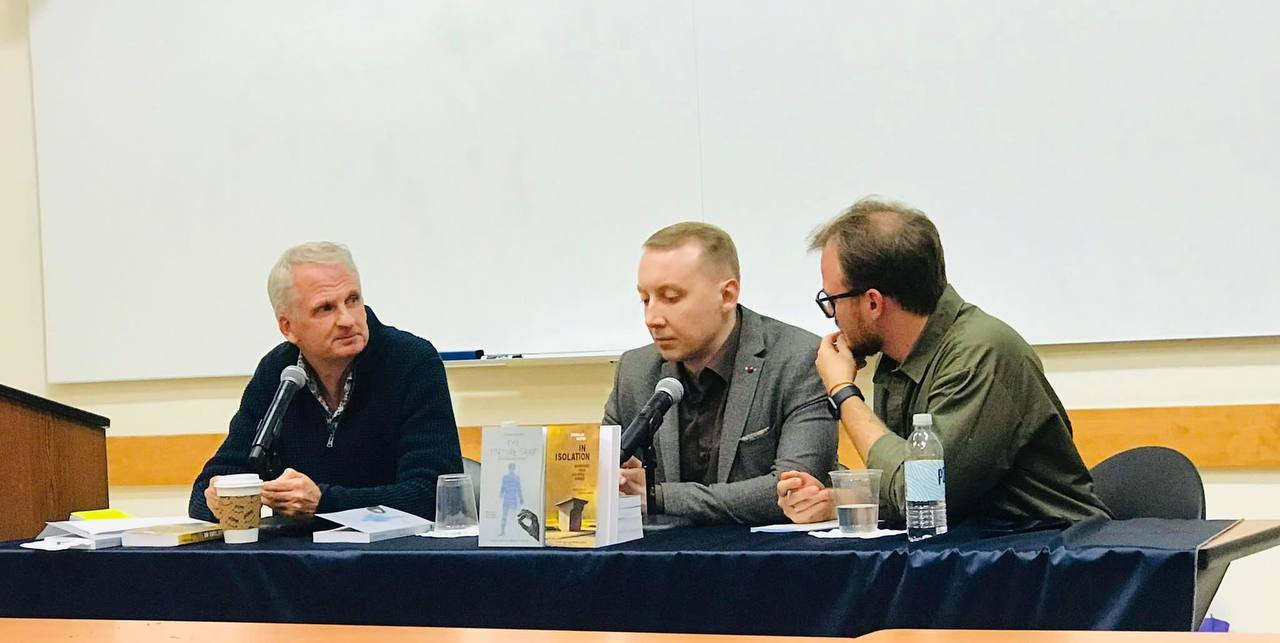
Stanislav Aseyev at the presentation of his books with Timothy D. Snyder

While remaining in his native Donbas region from the beginning of Russia-sponsored hostilities there, Aseyev contributed short dispatches on the situation on the ground to prominent Ukrainian and international media, writing under the pen name of Vasin. A book of collected dispatches entitled In Isolation (in Ukrainian and Russian) appeared while he was still in captivity.

Following his release, Aseyev published an autobiographical work entitled The Torture Camp on Paradise Street (in Ukrainian), describing his time in the illegal prison Izoliatsia and the mistreatment and torture prisoners experienced there at the hands of the Russian-controlled administration.

== Awards ==
- Free Media Awards 2020
- National Freedom of Expression Award 2020
- Taras Shevchenko National Prize (Shevchenko Award) 2021
- Dianna Ortiz Award for Courage 2023
- NNW International Film Festival Award "The Door to Freedom"
- Brigade Cross for service
- Freedom Award 2024
- Ceny paměti národa 2026

== Works ==
- Шестой день: сб. поэм, рассказов и стихов / Станислав Владимирович Асеев. — Донецк: Норд-Пресс, 2011. — 207 с. — ISBN 978-966-380-480-4 (in Russian)
- Андерхилльские ведьмы: драма: в 2 ч. Проза / Станислав Владимирович Асеев. — Донецк: Донбасс, 2011. — 228 с. — ISBN 978-617-638-065-8 (in Russian)
- Мельхиоровый слон, или Человек, который думал: Роман-автобиография / С. Асеев // Юность. — 2015. — No. 1—6.(in Russian)
- Мельхиоровый слон, или Человек, который думал: роман-автобиография / Станислав Асеев. — Киев : Каяла, 2016. — 267 с. — ISBN 978-617-7390-05-2 (in Russian)
- В ізоляції / Станіслав Асєєв, тексти, фото; передм. Мар'яни Драч, Сергія Рахманіна, Дмитра Крапивенка; ілюстр. Сергія Захарова // К.: Люта справа, 2018. — 208 с. — ISBN 978-617-7420-18-6
- In Isolation: Dispatches from Occupied Donbas (2022) translated by Lidia Wolanskyj. Cambridge: Harvard Ukrainian Research Institute. ISBN 978-0-674-26878-4
- Aseyev, Stanisław (2020). Svitlyĭ Shli͡akh: istorii͡a odnoho kont͡staboru [Light Path: the history of a concentration camp] (in Russian). Translated by Stakh, Viktoriya (1st ed.). Lviv: The Old Lion. ISBN 978-617-679-854-5. OCLC 1389777078. OL 43803667M. Wikidata Q107392599.
- Aseyev, Stanisław (2021), The Torture Camp on Paradise Street, translated by Anonymous; Anonymous, Lviv: The Old Lion, Wikidata Q107392497
- The Torture Camp on Paradise Street, (2022) translated by Zenia Tompkins and Nina Murray. Cambridge, Mass.: Harvard Ukrainian Research Institute. ISBN 978-0-674-29107-2 (hardcover)
