= Museum of Outstanding Figures of Ukrainian Culture =

Culture museum in Kyiv

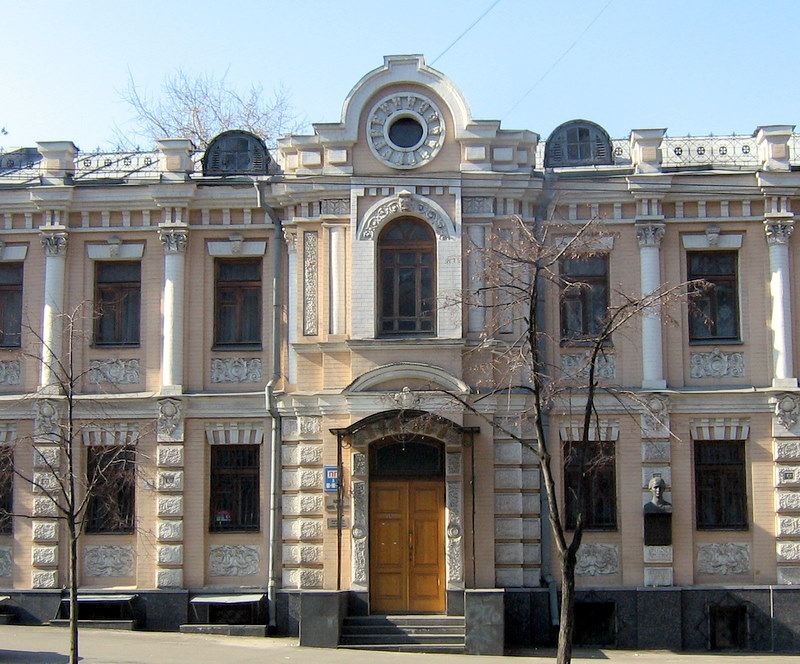
- Lesia Ukrainka house
- Location: 97 Saksahanskoho St, Kyiv, Ukraine
- Coordinates: 50.4398°N 30.5008°E

Immovable Monument of National Significance of Ukraine
- Official name: Будинок, у якому жила поетеса і громадська діячка Леся Українка (House where the poet and public figure Lesya Ukrainka lived)
- Type: History
- Reference no.: 260043-Н

The Museum of Outstanding Figures of Ukrainian Culture (Ukrainian: Музей видатних діячів української культури) is one of the museums in Kyiv, Ukraine, dedicated to prominent Ukrainian cultural figures: Lesia Ukrainka, Mykola Lysenko, Panas Saksahansky, Mykhailo Starytsky.

The museum was founded in 1987. The reason to create this museum space was that in the late 19th – early 20th centuries in this area lived the families of such Ukrainian cultural figures as Lesia Ukrainka, Mykola Lysenko, Panas Saksahansky and Mykhailo Starytsky.

The memorial buildings have been preserved till now, with each hosting an exhibition depicting the life and creative activities of the respective artist.

In December 2022, the original manuscript of Shchedryk by Mykola Leontovych was exhibited for the first time at this museum.

== Sources ==
- Museums of Kyiv. Guide-book, 2005. - P. 51
- Музей видатних діячів української культури Лесі Українки, Миколи Лисенка, Панаса Саксаганського, Михайла Старицького. Ілюстроване інформаційне видання. / Головне управління культури і мистецтв виконавчого органу Київської міської ради (Київської міської державної адміністрації); [упорядник Н. Терехова та інші]. — К. : Кий, 2007. — 144 с. : ілюстрації. — 1000 примірників.
