= Atlantis (2019 film) =

2019 film

- Film poster
- Directed by: Valentyn Vasyanovych
- Written by: Valentyn Vasyanovych
- Produced by: Iya Myslytska; Vladimir Yatsenko; Valentyn Vasyanovych; Rostyslav Martyniuk
- Starring: Andriy Rymaruk; Liudmyla Bileka; Vasyl Antoniak
- Cinematography: Valentyn Vasyanovych
- Edited by: Valentyn Vasyanovych
- Distributed by: Arthouse Traffic
- Release date: 4 September 2019 (Venice)
- Running time: 106 minutes
- Country: Ukraine
- Language: Ukrainian

Atlantis (Ukrainian: «Атлантида», romanized: Atlantyda) is a 2019 Ukrainian dystopian post-apocalyptic film directed by Valentyn Vasyanovych. It tells the story of a former soldier struggling with post-traumatic stress disorder in a near-future Ukraine, following a war with Russia.

It received positive critical reviews overall and won the award for Best Film in the Horizons section of the 76th Venice International Film Festival. It was selected as the Ukrainian entry for the Best International Feature Film at the 93rd Academy Awards, but it was not nominated. Atlantis received new attention three years after its release with the Russian invasion of Ukraine, which the film had fictionally depicted the aftermath of.

== Plot ==
Sergiy is a retired soldier with PTSD trying to navigate life in Eastern Ukraine. The events take place in 2025, one year after the end of the war with Russia. He works at a smelter with another veteran and friend, Ivan, both ostracized by other workers blaming them for fighting in the war that devastated the region. Sergiy and Ivan still train much like the war has not ended, dressing in combat uniforms and competing in high-stress target shooting. Ivan commits suicide in a smelting pot, and the factory is shut down shortly afterwards due to economic liberalization rendering it nonprofitable. Sergiy then finds himself in a new job driving a water truck and delivering to areas where pollution from the war has made local sources unpotable. He has trouble adapting to his new life until he meets Katya, previously an archaeologist who now works as a humanitarian activist for the Black Tulip Mission, a volunteer organization exhuming and identifying the war dead. Sergiy is offered the opportunity to escape his situation, after saving a member of an environmental NGO from a mine, but it is implied in the conclusion that he has decided to remain with the Black Tulip Mission. The movie is bookended by stylized scenes shot by thermal camera, one of the killing of a captured sniper (later exhumed in the movie) and the other of Sergiy and Katya hugging at the conclusion of the film.

== Production ==
None of the roles in this movie were played by actors, but rather by veterans, volunteers, and soldiers. One of the main roles was played by Andriy Rymaryk, a former military scout, who went through the war in Donbas and currently works at Come Back Alive, a Ukrainian NGO that helps Ukrainian soldiers through crowdfunding. Paramedic Liudmyla Bileka and volunteer Vasyl Antoniak were also in the film.

Photography predominantly occurred in Mariupol, from January to March 2018.

== Reception ==
On Rotten Tomatoes, the film holds an approval rating of 97% based on 36 reviews, and an average rating of 7.7/10. On Metacritic, which uses a weighted average, the film has a score of 85 out of 100, based on 10 critics, indicating "universal acclaim".

In a positive review, Richard Abele of The Los Angeles Times wrote, "we’re fortunate to have artists like Vasyanovych to show us what’s dazzling, strange, tragic, comic, touching and eventually optimistic about the way forward." Joe Morgenstern of The Wall Street Journal called the film "literally and figuratively visionary". Peter Sobczynski of RogerEbert.com gave it three-and-a-half stars out of four, noting that while Atlantis was "by far one of the bleakest films to come along in quite some time," it "never becomes too unbearable to watch".

In another positive review, Glenn Kenny of The New York Times compared the film's long, static takes to early work by US directors Stanley Kubrick and Jim Jarmusch. In one of the film's few negative reviews, Lee Jutton of Film Inquiry noted the film's "admirable intentions" but stated that the long, slow takes left her "as cold as the barren Ukrainian plains depicted in the film."

It was screened in the Contemporary World Cinema section at the 2019 Toronto International Film Festival. At the 76th Venice International Film Festival, the film won the award for Best Film in the Horizons section. It was selected as the Ukrainian entry for the Best International Feature Film at the 93rd Academy Awards, but it was not nominated.

The film's subject matter – an all-out war between Ukraine and Russia, in which Ukraine is able to hold back a theoretically superior Russian force – was seen by some critics and audiences as "prophetic", when the Russo-Ukrainian War sharply escalated two years after the film's release with the Russian invasion of Ukraine.

== See also ==
- List of submissions to the 93rd Academy Awards for Best International Feature Film
- List of Ukrainian submissions for the Academy Award for Best International Feature Film
