= Izolyatsia prison =

Prison site, Ukraine

Coordinates: 47°57′51″N 37°50′03″E

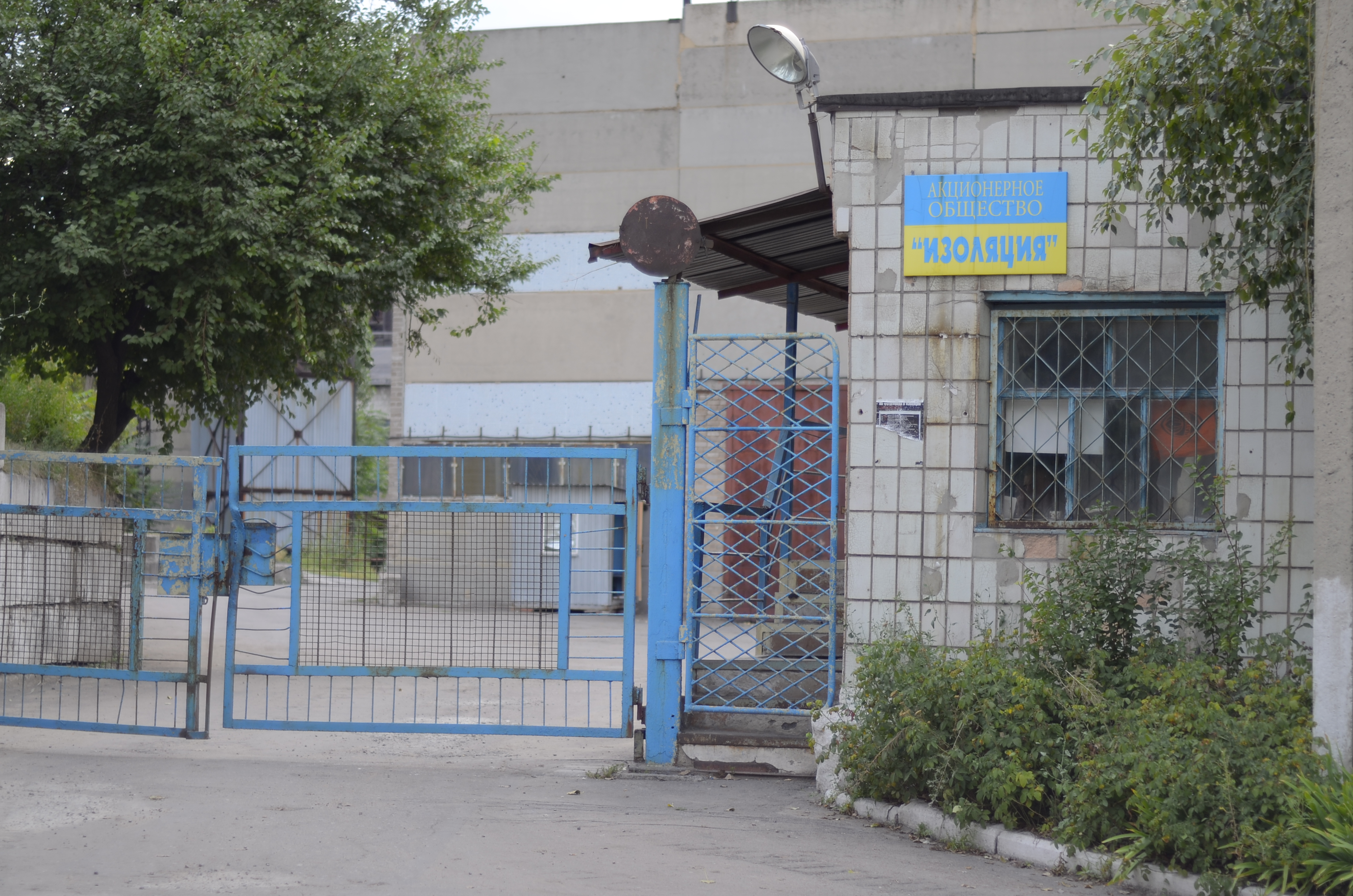
Entrance to the building in 2012 before it became a prison

The premises of the former Izolyatsia (Ukrainian: Ізоляція, romanized: Izoliatsiia, lit. 'isolation', Russian: Изоляция) factory and art centre are used as a torture prison in Donetsk, Ukraine, created after the city's capture in 2014 by Russian armed forces. The prison was established after representatives of the Donetsk People's Republic (DPR) seized the site of the Izolyatsia Arts Foundation and converted it into a closed site of the State Security Ministry of the DPR. Izolyatsia functions as a training facility for DPR fighters as well as a depot for automobiles, military technology and weapons. The prison has secret status as detainees are convicted by illegal DPR courts without proper investigation. There are numerous known cases where Izolyatsia inmates only gave confession after being tortured.

== History ==
The building was constructed in 1955 as a factory for processing raw mineral cotton and was later adapted to produce stitched mineral cotton slabs, mineral cotton wool, basaltic fiber, basaltic cardboard, basaltic mates, and slabs on basaltic basis. The factory closed in 1990. From 2010 to 2014, the Izolyatsia Foundation, centered around the creative arts, occupied the site. The name of the arts organization is taken from that of the factory and its main product, insulation, and also means "isolation". "Izolyatsia" is one of 160 illegal prisons in the Russia-occupied territories of Ukraine.

=== Seizure of the Izolyatsia Foundation site ===
On 9 June 2014, armed representatives of the DPR invaded the Izolyatsia Foundation site. Roman Lyagin, who participated in the seizure, and who was Russia's head of the "Donetsk People's Republic" "Central Electoral Commission" claimed that the premises were necessary to store humanitarian aid received from the Russian Federation. According to Leonid Baranov, who was the State Security Minister of the DPR at the time, the Izolyatsia Foundation's site was seized for ideological reasons: It was thought that the Foundation's values would bring harm to the DPR. Liubov Mikhailova, Izolyatsia Foundation's founder, claims that infrastructure played a part since Izolyatsia is a 7.5ha developed site.

According to the data presented in the DRA's report and the media initiative for human rights, the Vostok Battalion settled on the site in June 2014 and prisoners of war and civilian hostages were kept on the premises.

== Conditions ==
According to the testimony of former prisoners, the offices and basements of the former factory were reequipped as jail cells with five-litre cans for toilets. A few of the administrative buildings were used by the staff of the Izolyatsia prison as torture chambers.

Former prisoners have remarked that the Izolyatsia buildings are not equipped to serve as a prison, and that its conditions more closely resemble those of a concentration camp. Prisoners are forced to work for the wardens, who regularly use physical violence, and are deprived of food, water, and medical care.

From 2014 to 2016, as many as 100 prisoners were held in basement cells at any one time. Izolyatsia lacked bunks and toilets, so prisoners used plastic water containers for waste. By 2017, there were still no toilets in the cells located above the basements, so prisoners were led to a separate building to use the toilets twice a day. Prisoners could lose toilet privileges. In July 2017, at the initiative of one of the prisoners, the prison cells were renovated and toilets and sinks were installed. Nevertheless, in many of the buildings—the two isolation cells and the sixth cell, called the "luxe"—conditions did not change.

According to the report by the Office of the UN High Commissioner for Human Rights for the period from 16 November 2019 to 15 February 2020, the individuals detained in Izolyatsia underwent torture, including electric shocks, mock executions and sexual violence. In accordance with the report, representatives of the DPR's state security ministry carried out interrogations there. The journalist Stanislav Aseyev, who was held in the Izolyatsia prison from 2017 to 2019, stated that acts have been carried out there would qualify as war crimes. He described the torture leading to suicide attempts of several prisoners.

During the 2022 Russian invasion of Ukraine, Ukraine's foreign minister, Dmytro Kuleba, said that the prison "continues to function as a literal concentration camp, in Europe in the 21st Century".

== Notable prisoners ==
In 2014, there were more than 100 prisoners in Izolyatsia. Dmitrii Potekhin, Valentina Buchok, Galina Gaeva, and Stanislav Aseyev have all been held in Izolyatsia.

== Roman Lyagin case ==
In June 2019, Lyagin was apprehended by representatives of the SSU. Lyagin was accused of participation in a terrorist organisation, infringement of Ukraine's territorial integrity, and treason for his role in organising a referendum regarding the status of the DPR, the results of which were not recognised by Ukraine, the European Union or the United States. Lyagin was also implicated in the seizure of the Izolyatsia Foundation's site by the DPR. Representatives of the foundation and former captives of the Izolyatsia prison insist that Lyagin is personally responsible for the seizure of the site and its transformation into a secret prison, but Kyiv's Shevchenkovskyi Court has not recognised the foundation or the former Izolyatsia prisoners as an injured party in the Lyagin case.

== Propaganda ==
Photographs and videos were produced at Izolyatsia showing ISIL fighters alongside soldiers from the Ukrainian Azov Battalion. An investigation conducted by BBC journalists with assistance from Wikimapia established where the shoot took place and refuted the material as fake.

== Creative works ==
- 2018: essay collection by Stanislav Aseyev, V іzolyatsiï (In isolation).
- 2020: documentary film, Kontstabir "Izoliatsiia" (Izoliatsiia concentration camp), directed by Sergii Ivanov.
- Stanislav Aseyev (2021), The Torture Camp on Paradise Street, translated by Anonymous; Anonymous, Lviv: The Old Lion, Wikidata Q107392497

== See also ==
- Russian filtration camps for Ukrainians
- February 2015 Kramatorsk rocket attack
- January 2015 Mariupol rocket attack
- Malaysia Airlines Flight 17
- Murder of Pentecostals in Sloviansk
- Novosvitlivka refugee convoy attack
- Stepan Chubenko
- Volnovakha bus attack
- Volodymyr Ivanovych Rybak, Ukrainian politician murdered by pro-Russian militants
