= New Europe Film Sales =

Polish film production and distribution company

New Europe Film Sales is a Polish independent film distributor. The company was founded in Warsaw in 2010 by Jan Naszewski of the New Horizons Film Festival.
