= 114th Separate Guards Motor Rifle Brigade =

114th Guards Enakievo-Danube Order "For the Defense of Donetsk" Motor Rifle Brigade (2023–present) 11th Guards Enakievo-Danube Order "For the Defense of Donetsk" Motor Rifle Regiment (2015–2023) Vostok Battalion (2014–2015)
- 114-я гвардейская мотострелковая Енакиево-Дунайская, ордена "За оборону Донецка" бригада
- Active: May 2014–present
- Country: Donetsk People's Republic (2014–2022); Russia (2022–present)
- Branch: (Donetsk People's Republic) DPR People's Militia (2014–2022); Russian Ground Forces (2022–present)
- Size: Brigade
- Part of: 51st Combined Arms Army
- Garrison/HQ: Donetsk; MUN 08818
- Nickname: East Brigade (Бригада «Восток»)
- Engagements: War in Donbas; First Battle of Donetsk Airport; Battles for Karlivka; Battle of Yasynuvata; Battle of Avdiivka (2017); Russian invasion of Ukraine; 2023 Ukrainian counteroffensive; Battle of Avdiivka (2023–2024)
- Decorations: Guards; Order «For the Defense of Donetsk»
- Battle honours: Enakievo-Danube

Commanders
- Current commander: Yuri Zazykin
- Notable commanders: Alexander Khodakovsky

Insignia
- Flag used by the members of the unit

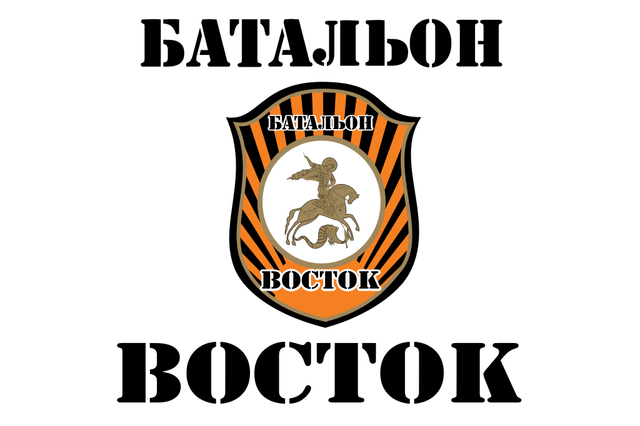
- Former flag

The 114th Guards Motor Rifle Brigade (Russian: 114-я гвардейская мотострелковая бригада, 114 омсбр; Military Unit Number 08818) or Vostok Brigade (Russian: Бригада «Восток») is a military unit of Russian Ground Forces. Until January 1, 2023, it was part of the self-proclaimed Donetsk People's Republic (DPR). It is attached to the 51st Donetsk Combined Arms Army. The brigade was created by Alexander Khodakovsky.

== History ==
=== War in Donbas ===
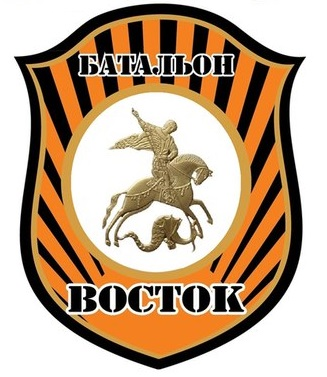
Emblem used by the Vostok Battalion in 2014

The Vostok Battalion was formed in early May 2014 by Alexander Khodakovsky, a former commander in a Donetsk detachment of Ukraine's anti-terrorism special forces unit Alpha, part of the Security Service of Ukraine (SBU).

In May 2014, the Vostok Battalion took part in battles with the Ukrainian army in the village of Karlivka and at the Donetsk airport. The battalion occupied the airport on 26 May, though the operation was characterized by Vzglyad as unsuccessful and a trap, as the newspaper claimed that the unit lost at least 60 men killed in action from Ukrainian airstrikes and helicopter strikes.

On 29 May, members of the Vostok Battalion stormed the Donetsk separatist headquarters, expelling a "motley band" of pro-Russian rebels that occupied it since March, accusing them of looting local supermarkets. According to Radio Free Europe/Radio Liberty, the raid was widely seen as a part of an attempt by a Moscow-connected faction to take control over the insurgency in the Donbas from "ragtag" elements associated with Igor Girkin and Alexander Borodai, with Mark Galeotti characterizing the battalion as a "more disciplined" force associated with Russian military intelligence.

On 5 June 2014, a convoy of 200 Vostok militiamen set off from Donetsk with the aim of capturing a Ukrainian border checkpoint at Marynivka. The convoy was led by Khodakovsky and numbered 15 vehicles, including an armored personnel carrier, trucks mounted with anti-aircraft heavy machine guns, and Ladas. The convoy encountered no Ukrainian government forces on the way to Marynivka.

According to separatist intelligence, the Ukrainian border guards stationed there were demoralized and prepared to give up their position without fighting. In reality, the checkpoint had been reinforced by the Ukrainian military. A nearly four-hour firefight broke out, destroying the border post and leaving two Vostok militants dead and several wounded on both sides. The separatists retreated across the Russian border at Kuybyshevo, where they were disarmed, interrogated, and imprisoned by Russian border guards.

A few days before the clash at Marynivka, Khodakovsky had claimed that the battalion consisted of 1,000 men. However, The Times journalist Mark Franchetti reported shortly after the battle that the battalion numbered fewer than 400 men, and that it had lost 50 in combat at the Donetsk airport in May. Around the same time, Andrew Roth of The New York Times reported that the battalion had over 500 fighters.

Vzgylad called Vostok "one of the most professional" units of the Donetsk People's Republic militia. In early June 2014, the Vostok Battalion was described by Reuters journalist Gabriela Baczynska as a "well-organized" and "heavily armed" unit that was "seeking to lead" the pro-Russian separatist cause. By June 2014, the unit was headquartered in a former Ukrainian army base in the northeastern part of the city of Donetsk, and fighters from Russia, North Ossetia, South Ossetia, Chechnya, and former Soviet countries in Central Asia had joined its ranks. However, according to Franchetti, the battalion mostly consisted of locals from eastern Ukraine with no previous military experience who "had watched too much Channel One Russia and Russia-24" (Russian state television programming) and believed the Donbas needed to be defended from fascism.

According to Igor Girkin, Vostok was responsible for the defense of Yasynuvata, Avdiivka, Pisky and Karlivka during the active phase of the war in Donbas.

Towards the end of 2014 the battalion was first upgraded to a "Special Brigade" (Спецбригада), and then in 2015 changed again to the 11th Separate Enakievo-Danube Motor Rifle Regiment "Vostok" within DPR 1st Army Corps.

In February 2015, Khodakovsky claimed that the battalion had lost 110 men killed and 172 wounded.

On 12 February 2016 the regiment was awarded the honorary designation "Guards".

On 3 November 2018 the regiment was awarded the order "For the Defense of Donetsk".

=== Russian invasion of Ukraine ===
At some point, either in the fall of 2022, after the unit was replenished with mobilized soldiers, or in January 2023, during the entry of the 1st Army Corps into the Russian Armed Forces, the regiment was reformed into the 114th Separate Guards Motor Rifle Brigade.

During the 2023 Ukrainian counteroffensive, the Vostok Brigade was in charge of defending the village of Urozhaine which is on the border of the Donetsk and Zaporizhzhia Oblasts. The village was described by The New York Times as a "stronghold" and an important part of the Russian defensive network on the Velyka Novosilka axis. Despite this, Russian media and Khodakovsky himself made it clear that the strategically important village would be solely defended by the Vostok Brigade against multiple units from the Ukrainian Marine Corps.

Fighting for the village began on 6 August 2023, and Khodakovsky announced that the Vostok Brigade would be withdrawing from the village on 15 August, stating that their defensive position had become untenable. Ukraine announced the liberation of the settlement on 16 August, and has been noted using artillery to shell retreating members of the Vostok Brigade resulting in high casualties among Khodakovsky's troops. On 17 February 2024 after the battle of Avdiivka, the brigade was thanked by the Supreme Commander-in-Chief of the Armed Forces of the Russian Federation.

Ukrainian analysts from DeepState noted the resilience of the brigade claiming that it was able to conduct assault operations for 8 full months straight without withering down. The analysts suggested that this is due to extensive "hidden mobilization" that was able to replenish casualties.
