= Dmitry Beliakov =

Russian photojournalist

Dmitry Beliakov is a Russian photojournalist, born in 1970, in the Vologda region, in Northwestern Russia.

== Career ==
Through the course of his career Beliakov has covered seven conflicts: Chechnya 1994-96,1999-2010; the Russian-Georgian conflict of 2008; Nagorno-Karabakh conflict 2016, 2020; the war in Syria (in 2012, 2016, 2017); the war in the Donbass area (from March 2014-November 2019)

From 1999 to 2007, he documented the Second Chechen War. Throughout this period, he tried to remain neutral through his images, neither favouring the Russian government nor the Chechen rebels. As a war photojournalist he faced ample danger with land mines and mortar fire. He was also confronted by censors and restrictions during his coverage of the conflict.

In September 2004, Beliakov covered the Beslan school siege in North Ossetia, documenting the events from a nearby rooftop. His photographs from the crisis, including a sequence showing a 6-year-old survivor, Aida Sidakova, shortly after the explosions, were widely circulated and received international recognition. Following the attack, Beliakov spent one week with colleagues locating the child, eventually confirming that she had survived with shrapnel injuries.

Beliakov has received many respected awards in photojournalism, including Amnesty UK Media Awards 2019/ Photojournalism; IMAGELY 2016 Fund Grant; POY (Pictures of the Year) 2015; NPPA (National Press Photographer's Association) 2010; OPC (Overseas Press Club of America) 2005 – Borovik Award. His work has been published in many notable newspapers and magazines, including The Sunday Times Magazine, Paris Match, GEO magazine, The New York Times, The Philadelphia Inquirer and the British Telegraph Magazine. He was profiled in a CBS News and Showtime Independent Films documentary drama called Three Days in September in 2006.

Beliakov's work has been exhibited in Russia, Italy, UAE, Armenia and United States. In 2011 his documentary project of b/w portraits of camera-shy Russian Special Forces was exhibited at the State Central Museum of Contemporary History of Russia.

2012 to 2014 photographer worked on a documentary photo-project about last witnesses of the Stalin’ 1944 mass exile of the Chechens and Ingush people. Project was introduced at Andrei Sakharov' Center in Moscow. Works were exhibited at the Gulag History Museum.

In August 2014, while covering the War in Donbass in eastern Ukraine, Dmitry Beliakov and his colleague Mark Franchetti, a reporter for the British newspaper The Sunday Times, pleaded with the pro-Russian rebel leader Alexander Khodakovsky to release Iryna Dovhan, a local resident who had been abducted by the insurgent group Vostok Battalion and subjected to imprisonment, torture and humiliation, for being accused of being a spy for the Ukrainian forces. This plead came after a photograph of her mistreatment taken by another photojournalist, Maurício Lima, stirred widespread outrage in Ukraine, prompted a social media effort to identify her and drew the attention of United Nations human rights monitors. The plead was attended and she was released.

2021-2022 Beliakov worked on a documentary photoproject “Armenian Journal” about post-war Armenia. Works were exhibited at the Center for Contemporary Experimental Art (NPAK) in republican capital Yerevan, Armenia.

In 2022, following the Russian invasion of Ukraine, which he publicly opposed, Beliakov relocated to the United States with his family. The move was supported in part by the Andrei Sakharov Foundation, and he subsequently received a fellowship at Norwich University in Vermont.

February 2023 Beliakov was invited by The John and Mary Frances Patton Peace and War Center at Norwich University to hold an exhibition of works from Donbas with a name “On the Margins of Europe: A War Before the War” and a special panel presentation (attended by representatives of CNN and HRW)

Beliakov currently lives in Vermont with his family and divides his time between commercial photography and travel across New England.
