= Alpha Group (Ukraine) =

Special Operations Center «A» of the Security Service of Ukraine
- Центр спеціальних операцій «А» Служби безпеки України
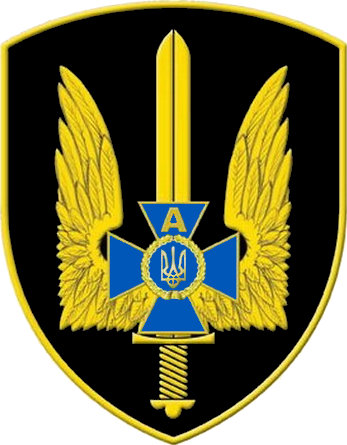
- The badge of SBU Alpha Group
- Active: 23 June 1994–present
- Country: Ukraine (1994–present)
- Allegiance: Security Service of Ukraine
- Branch: Special operations unit of the SBU (1994–present)
- Role: Special operations, counterterrorism
- Size: 10,000
- Garrison/HQ: Kyiv
- Nicknames: Alpha Group, Alpha, Alfa
- Motto: «Життя – Батьківщині! Честь ‒ нікому!» («Life to the Fatherland! Honor to no one!»)
- Engagements: Iraq War; Euromaidan; War in Donbas; Russian invasion of Ukraine: Battle of Antonov Airport; Battle of Hostomel; Snake Island campaign; Battle of Sievierodonetsk; Kharkiv counteroffensive; Battle of Bakhmut; Kursk offensive (2024–2025); Operation Spiderweb
- Decorations: For Courage and Bravery
- Website: https://alfa.ssu.gov.ua

Commanders
- Current commander: Yevhenii Khmara

Special Operations Center «А» of the Security Service of Ukraine (Ukrainian: ЦСО "А" СБУ, romanized: CSO "A" SBU), informally known as Alpha Group, Alpha or Alfa, is one of the special operations units of the Security Service of Ukraine (SBU). It has participated in the Russo-Ukrainian war since it began in 2014.

The unit's missions primarily involve sniping, counterterrorism, direct action, executive protection, high-value targets capture or elimination, hostage rescue, irregular warfare, long-range penetration, and special reconnaissance.

== History ==
=== Counterterrorist operations ===
On 23 June 1994, on the orders of President of Ukraine Leonid Kravchuk, Department «А» was created, a part of the Central Office of the Security Service of Ukraine. At the same time, regional units were formed in all oblasts, giving rise to the formation of Special Counterterrorist units under the command of the SBU.

On July 16, 1996, the first major reform of the unit took place. By decree of the President of Ukraine, Department «A» was renamed the Department for Combating Terrorism and Protecting Participants in Criminal Proceedings and Law Enforcement Officers of the SBU.

On December 27, 2005, a large-scale reform of the SBU's special operations departments took place, with a modern Center for Special Operations to Combat Terrorism, Protect Participants in Criminal Proceedings, and Law Enforcement Officers being created. It was then that the unit received its well-known abbreviation, CSO "A" SBU.

On July 31, 2000, in the building of the Kyiv disciplinary battalion, two violators of military discipline, Ukrainian army servicemen Oleksandr Stankevych and Mykhailo Nevzorov, attacked a guard, seized an AKM assault rifle with 60 rounds of ammunition, locked up 18 people (the guard and their fellow servicemen) and demanded food and alcohol. After six hours of negotiations, the building was stormed by members of the Kyiv Alfa unit, and the criminals were detained.

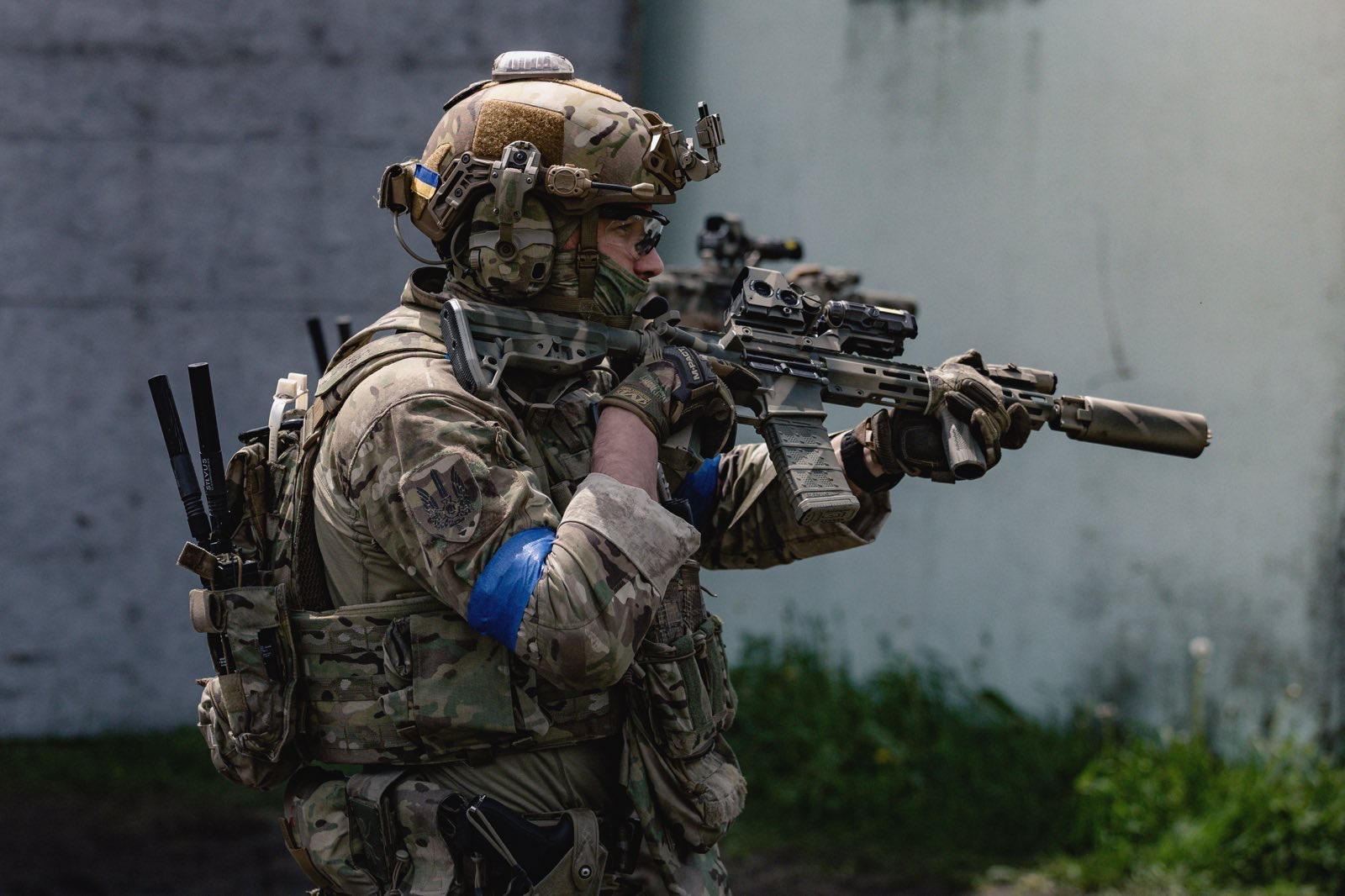
An Alpha Group operator during the filming of the 2026 film Killhouse.

Since 2004, the center's fighters have been involved in ensuring the security of the Ukrainian embassy in Baghdad (Iraq). In total, more than 190 SBU employees have been sent on missions over the entire period.

On October 1, 2011, a combat clash between SBU special forces and a local terrorist group occurred in Odesa. The day before, the criminals shot and killed two law enforcement officers and wounded four. The armed criminals barricaded themselves in a hotel and resisted attempts by a police special forces unit to storm the building for more than four hours. The turning point came only after the intervention of fighters from the local CSO "A" unit. As a result of the operation, the criminals were neutralized.

On July 21, 2020, in Lutsk, a man armed with firearms and explosives hijacked a bus. Operators from the SBU's Special Operations Center "A" quickly arrived at the scene and began negotiations with the terrorist. With their actions, it was possible to avoid casualties among the hostages and detain the criminal.

=== War in Donbas ===
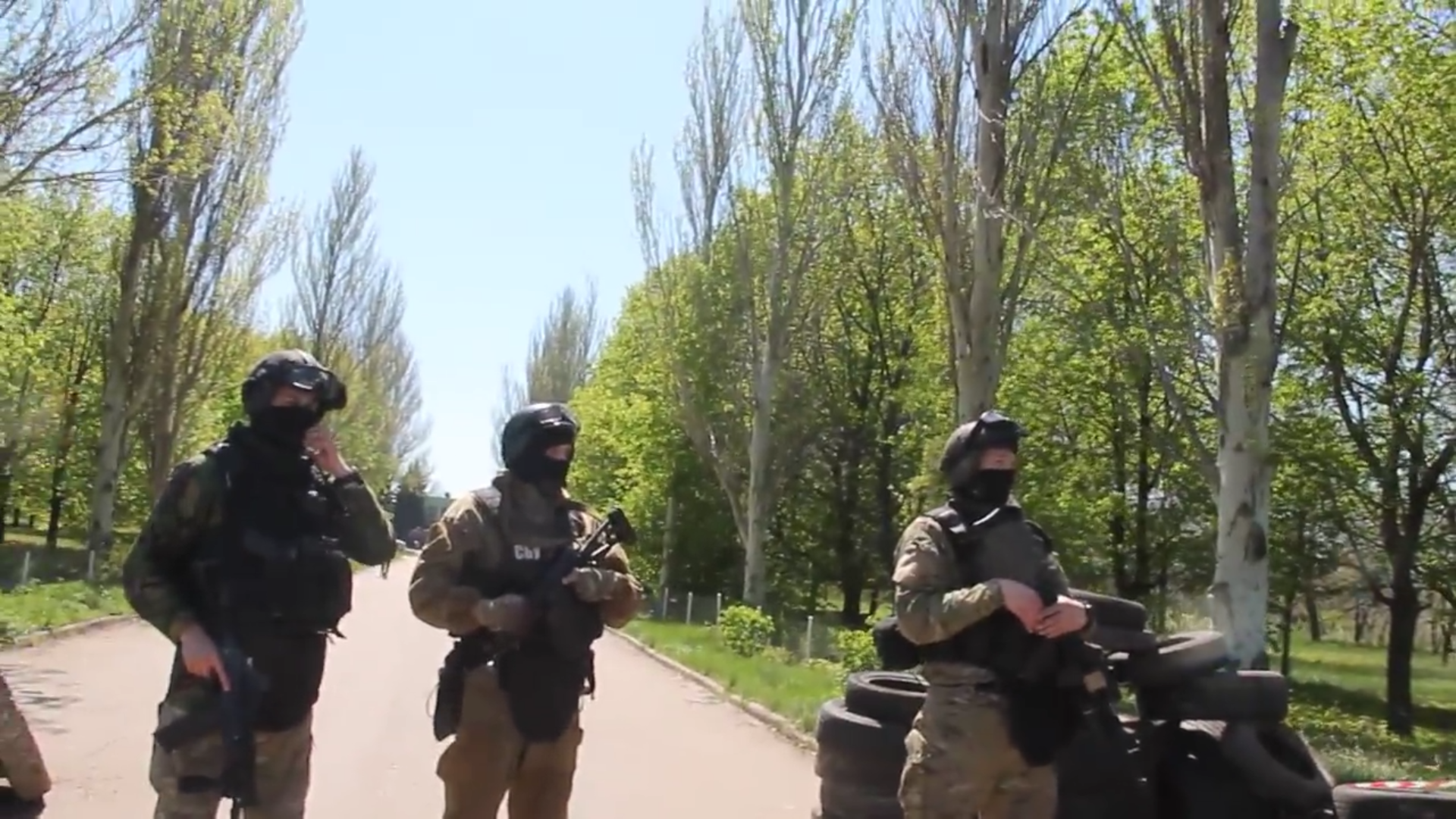
Alpha Group operators after the Battle of Kramatorsk

In April 2014, in the aftermath of the Revolution of Dignity, when Alpha snipers were alleged to have shot at protesters, it was purged and reorganised, and deployed to fight against pro-Russian separatist forces in the war in Donbas.

On April 13, 2014, the Joint Forces Operation "A" first engaged in armed conflict with pro-Russian militants, near the city of Sloviansk, Donetsk oblast.

In late April 2014, three officers were ambushed by members of the separatist armed groups led by pro-Russian terrorist Igor Girkin in the town of Horlivka, after which they were tortured. The SBU spokeswoman said the separatists acted on a tip from infiltrators inside the agency.

As part of the anti-terrorist operation announced on the same day, the center's employees, in cooperation with other units of the Ukrainian security and defense sector, participated in stabilization and assault operations, in particular in the liberation of Sloviansk, Kramatorsk, Mariupol, and other settlements temporarily occupied by Russian separatist forces in Ukraine.

The SBU Alfa defector Alexander Khodakovsky, a former Alfa commander for Donetsk Oblast who had betrayed Ukraine along with several of his men and became the commander of the terrorist Vostok Battalion and later was given the post of security minister of the separatist so-called "Donetsk People's Republic".

On April 15, 2014, the SBU's Special Operations Center "A" unit, together with the National Guard of Ukraine's "Omega" special unit, took control of the strategically important airfield in Kramatorsk without any losses. This allowed Ukrainian forces to ensure the airlift of personnel, equipment, and logistical support to the ATO zone.

During 2014–2021, SBU Special Operations Forces "A" fighters were systematically involved in combat missions in the area of the anti-terrorist operation and, later, the Joint Forces Operation. The main areas of activity were the neutralization of sabotage groups, the detection and detention of members of illegal armed formations, as well as counter-sabotage and special operations behind enemy lines.

The center's sniper units were deployed along the entire line of demarcation and carried out priority strikes on targets within the framework of interagency tasks coordinated by the ATO/JFO headquarters.

=== Russian invasion of Ukraine ===
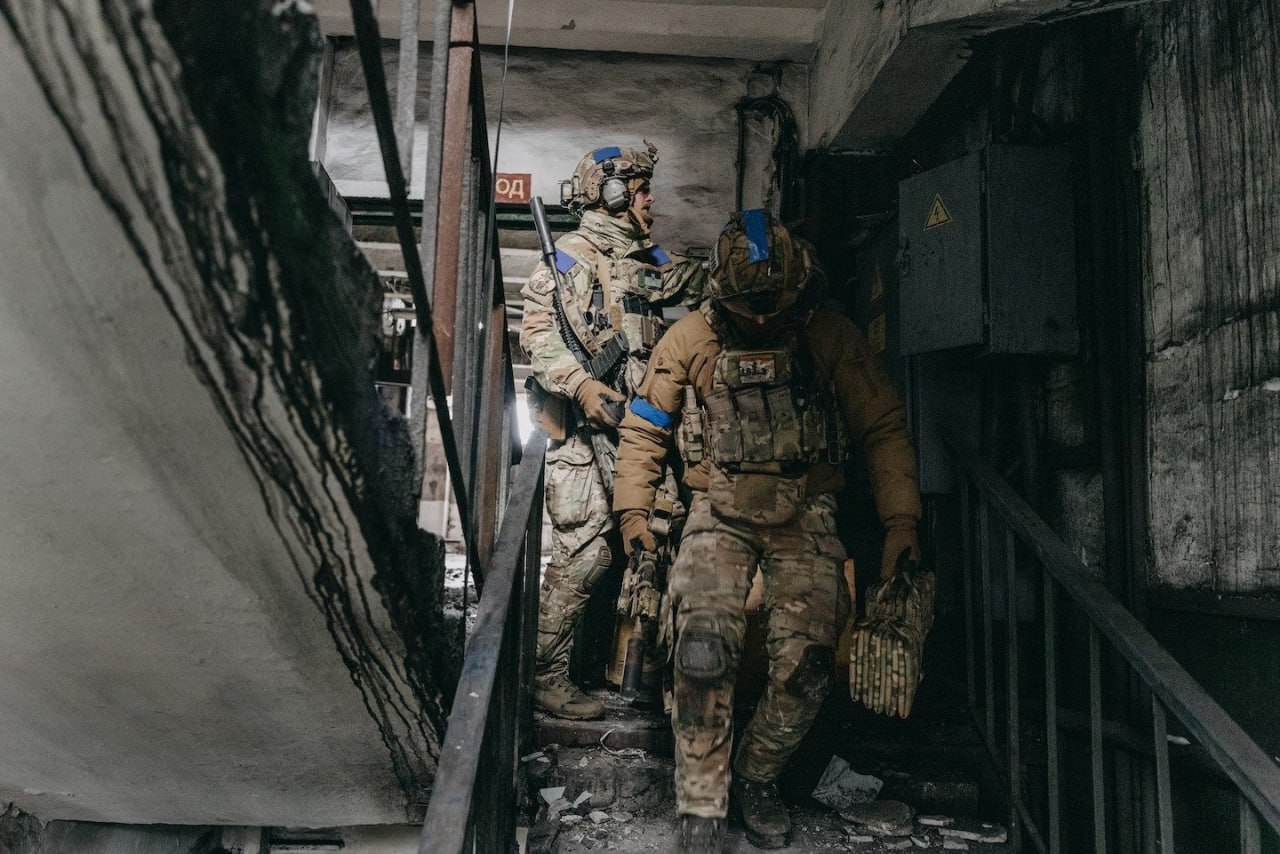
Alpha Group fighters in Avdiivka in February 2024

During the Russian invasion of Ukraine, the Alpha group ambushed and destroyed a Russian military convoy in northern Kyiv, around Hostomel, composed of Chechen paramilitary (the "Kadyrovtsy") heading to the city. The Alpha Group was present in Kharkiv, defending the city at the Battle of Kharkiv. During the 2022 Kharkiv counteroffensive, the Alpha Group re-captured several strategically crucial settlements such as Kupiansk.

CSO "A" participated in the Battle of Bakhmut, Batle of Sievierodonetsk, Kursk campaign, Battle of Avdiivka, and the Snake Island campaign.

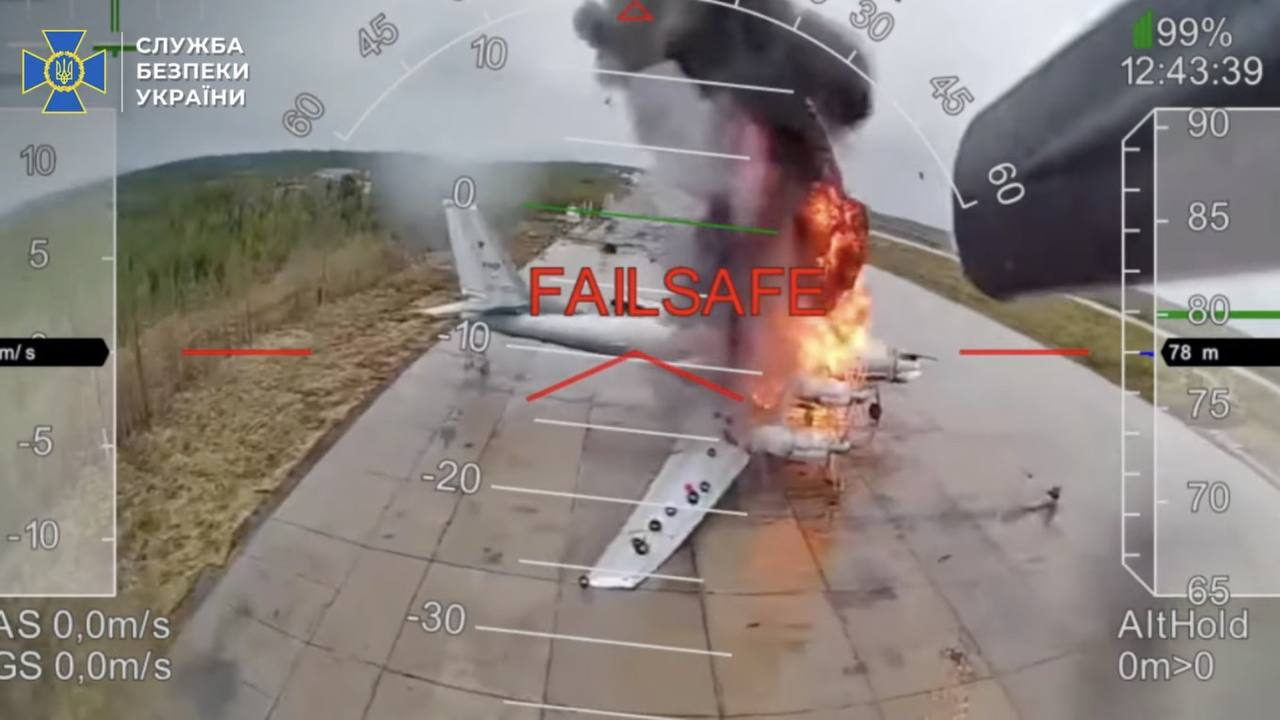
A Russian aircraft set on fire by a drone strike during Operation Spiderweb

During Operation Spiderweb, Alfa fighters operated drones with which they hit at least 41 Russian aircraft, worth more than $7 billion.

As of June 2025, Alpha Group units continued active hostilities in particular in Donetsk, Luhansk and Zaporizhzhia regions. Separate forces were involved in offensive operations in the Kursk region.

The Alpha Group continued to develop tactics for UAV warfare. In June 2025 they were the first to introduce fiber optic drones, which are more impervious to electronic warfare countermeasures.

The unit attacked Belbek Air Base, near Sevastopol, in Russian-occupied Crimea, with FPVs on December 17 to 18, 2025. The drones destroyed a Russian MiG-31BM Foxhound-B jet fighter, two long-range 1L119 Nebo-SVU air defense radars, one 92N6 Grave Stone fire-control radar, a S-400 surface-to-air missile system, and a Pantsir SA-22B Greyhound.

The Alpha Group conducted operations to capture fifth columnists, Russian sympathisers, spies and infiltrators.

Alpha Groups drone attacks on Russian air assets continued in 2026. On January 26, according to footage released by the SBU, the unit hit airbase with FPV drone attacks destroying planes.

In late winter of 2026 the Alpha Unit attacked the port of Novorossiysk in Russia. FPV drones damaged Russian warships, destroyed air defense systems, and left oil infrastructure engulfed in flames. The Sheskharis oil terminal in the port is one of the largest in southern Russia.

== Operational record ==
From its inception in 1994 to 2010, members of the special unit carried out more than 7,000 operations, from weapons seizure to anti narcotics operations, to apprehension of organized gang members, with no casualties sustained.

The unit suffered its first casualty in June 2014, fighting against pro-Russian separatists Russian special forces, in the war in Donbas. As of 2018, ten SBU Alpha operators had lost their lives in the conflict.

Alpha Group is one of the most effective Ukrainian units. They have caused damage to the enemy worth more than US$5.5 billion. By their own claims, every sixth destroyed Russian tank was blown up by Alfa fighters. In 2025, Alpha Group disabled or destroyed close to four billion dollars in Russian air defense systems. In 2026, the unit continued to be effective with FPV drones. According to SBU reports, Alpha Group's action lead to over half of Russia's air defense being destroyed. In one week of March 2026, Alpha group eliminated over 1,800 Russian troops from the battlefield.

== Awards and recognition ==
As of June 2025, members of the Alpha Group received 1,804 state awards, including 21 members who were named Heroes of Ukraine, the highest military recognition. 869 of these state awards were received by Alpha Group soldiers during the full-scale Russian invasion of Ukraine.

== Traditions and symbols ==
=== Slogan ===
"Life is home to the motherland! Honor to no one!"

=== Symbolism ===
The name "A" or "Alpha" (Greek: άλφα) is the first letter of the Greek alphabet. Symbolizes the primacy, leadership and desire for the highest professionalism, as well as the orientation of the unit to perform anti-terrorist tasks.

=== Insignia ===
The emblem of the SBU "A" depicts a shield on which there are wings and a sword forming a Ukrainian trizub, in the center of which the SBU cross. The sword symbolizes the struggle of battle, while the shield symbolizes protection and defense. The wings symbolize nobility, dignity and honor. The SBU Cross is a sign that it is an operational and combat unit of the Security Service of Ukraine.

== Gallery ==
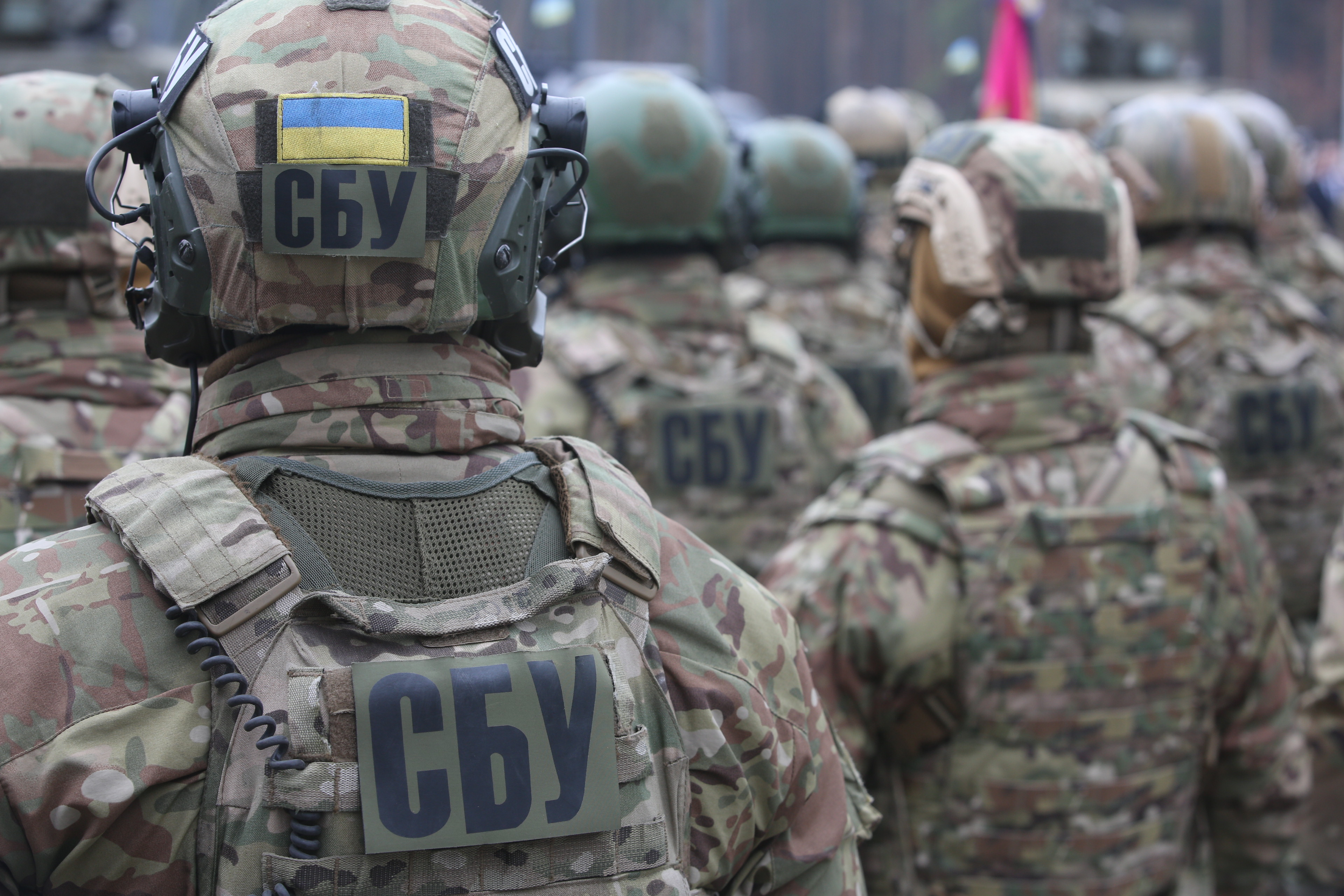
Alpha group operators in 2017

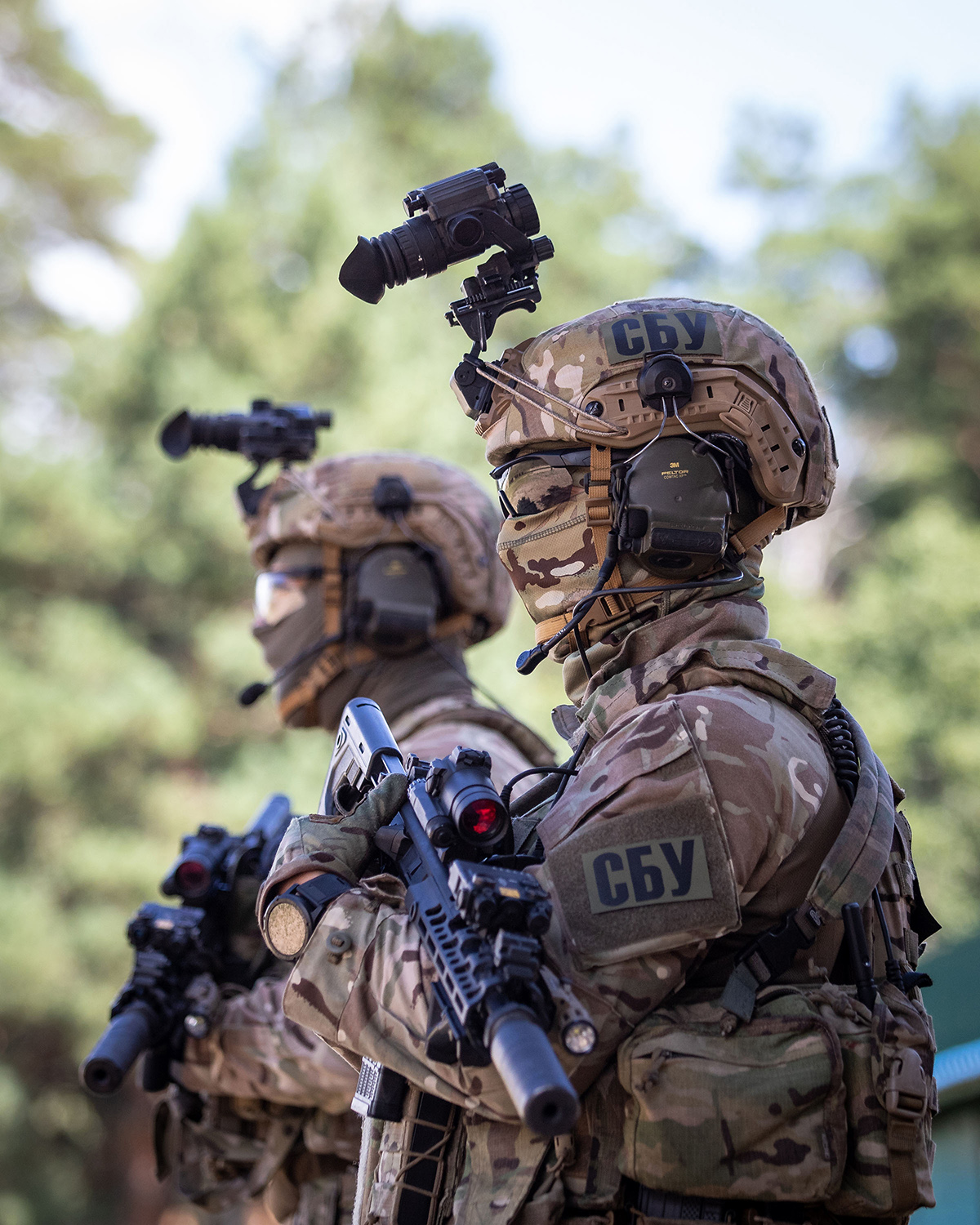
Alpha Group operators in 2020

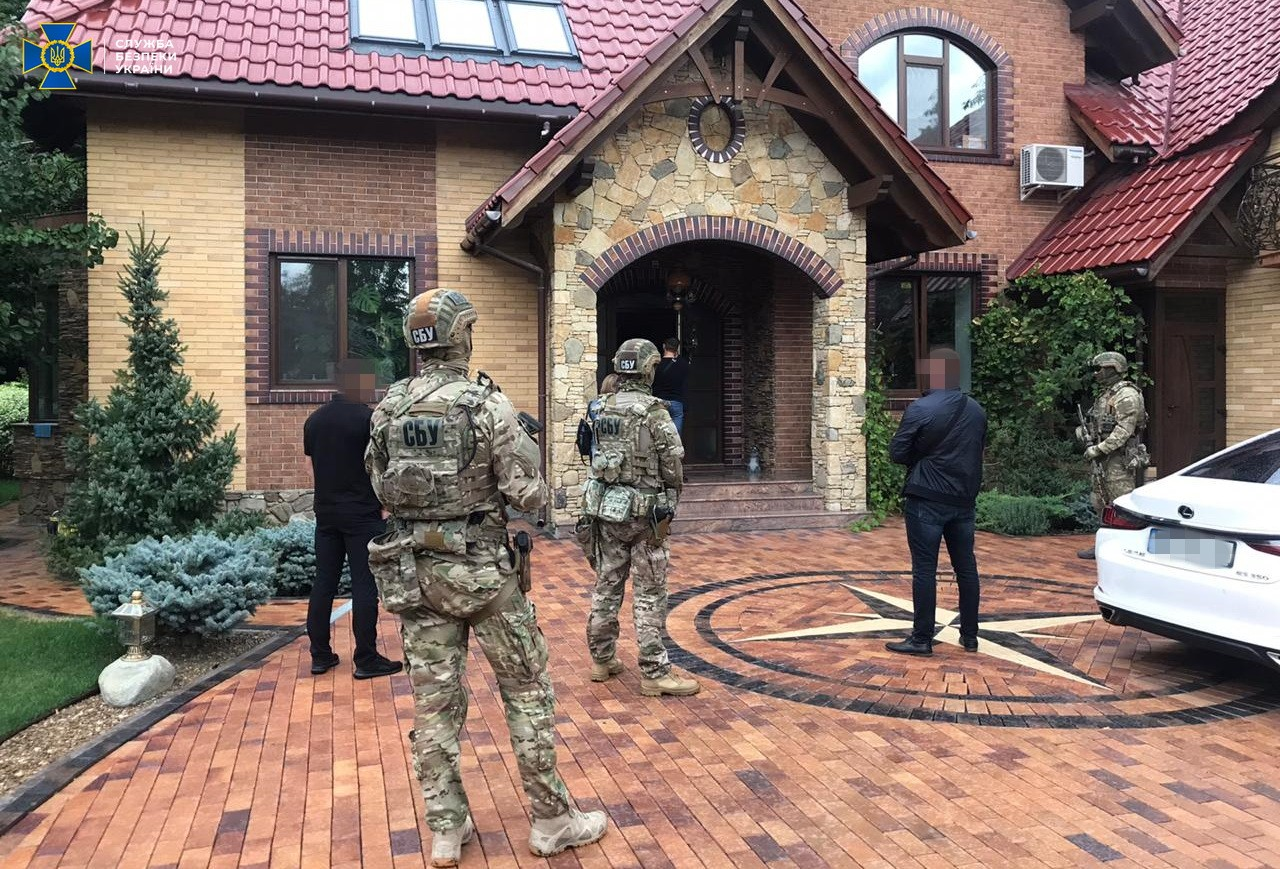
SBU and Alpha Group personnel arresting organizers of a Pyramid scheme in 2020

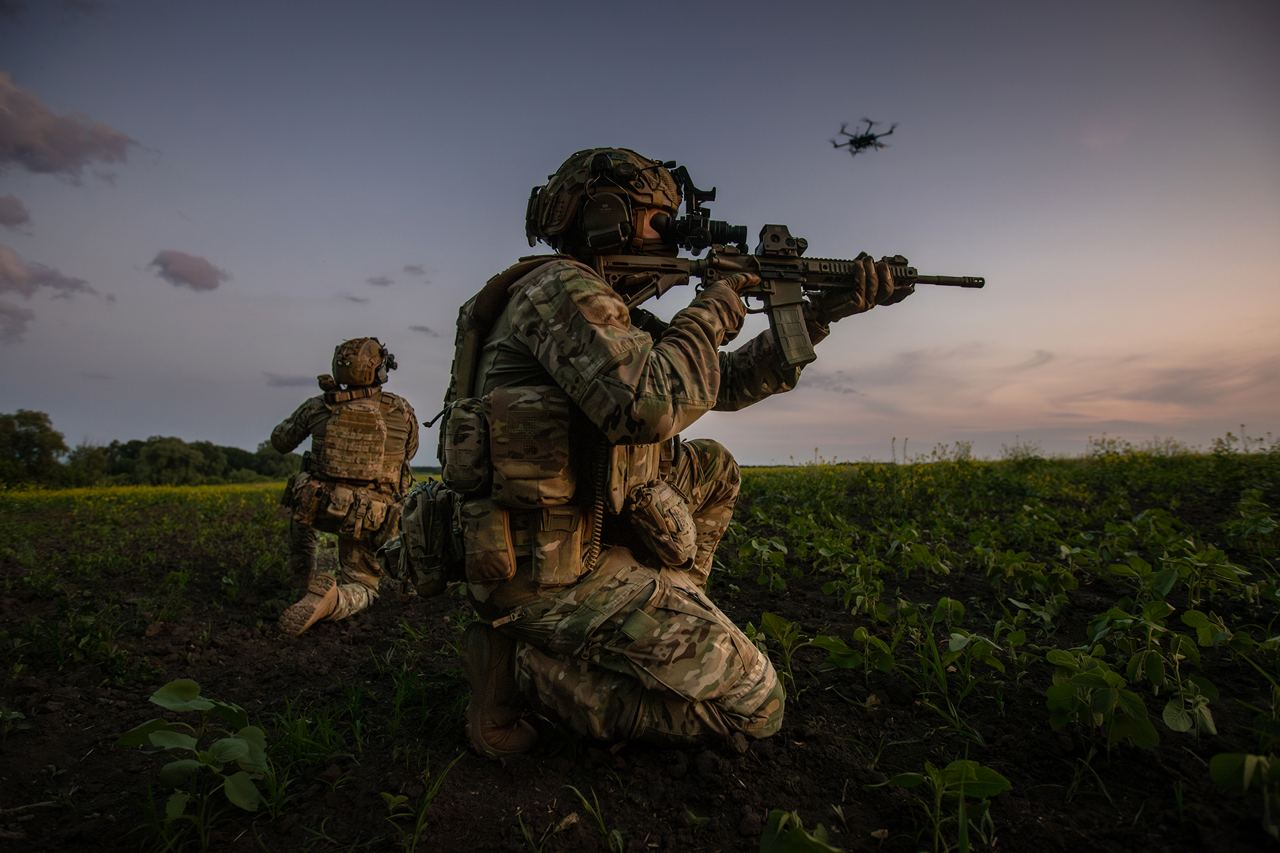
Operators with drone, unknown date

== Equipment ==
Name	Image	Country of origin	Type	Caliber	Details
Glock 17		Austria	Semi-automatic pistol	9×19mm Parabellum	
Heckler & Koch USP		Germany	Semi-automatic pistol	9×19mm Parabellum	
PSM		Soviet Union	Semi-automatic pistol	5.45×18mm	
PB		Soviet Union	Semi-automatic pistol	9×18mm Makarov	
Stechkin AP		Soviet Union	Pistol	9×18mm Makarov	
SIG MCX		United States	Assault rifle	5.56×45mm NATO.300 AAC Blackout	Used by SBU Alpha SOF.
AKS-74U		Soviet Union	Carbine	5.45×39mm	
Fort-500T		Ukraine	Pump action	12 gauge	Developed in the late 1990s. It is fitted with the CAA CBS retractable stock. Used by police forces and security service of Ukraine.
Brügger & Thomet MP9		Switzerland	Submachine gun	9×19mm Parabellum	Were bought in 2007 for use by SBU.
Heckler & Koch MP5		Germany	Submachine gun	9×19mm Parabellum	
FN P90		Belgium	Submachine gun	FN 5.7×28mm	More than 30× P90LV were bought in 2008.
VSS Vintorez		Soviet Union	Sniper rifle	9×39mm	
Sako TRG-22		Finland	Sniper rifle	7.62×51mm NATO	
Blaser R93 Tactical 2		Germany	Sniper rifle	7.62×51mm NATO	
SIG Sauer SSG 3000		Germany	Sniper rifle	7.62×51mm NATO	
Brügger & Thomet APR		Switzerland; Ukraine	Sniper rifle	7.62×51mm NATO	Made under license by Tactical Systems as the TS.M.308/338.
Desert Tech SRS		United States	Sniper rifle	7.62×51mm NATO	Were bought in 2016
Desert Tech HTI		United States	Anti-materiel rifle	.50 BMG	Were bought in 2020

== See also ==
- Special Operations Forces (Ukraine)
