= Iryna Dovhan =

Ukrainian activist

- Ірина Довгань
- Born: 5 January 1962 (age 64); Donetsk, Ukrainian SSR, Soviet Union
- Citizenship: Ukraine (since 1991); Soviet Union (1962–1991)
- Occupations: Activist; beautician

Iryna Volodymyrivna Dovhan (Ukrainian: Ірина Володимирівна Довгань; born 25 January 1962) is a Ukrainian activist and a native of Yasynuvata (a Donetsk suburb), who was abducted in 2014 by pro-Russian insurgents of the Vostok Battalion. She says that she was beaten and humiliated for five days. According to her testimony, she was held in jail and interrogated before being handed over to mercenaries, apparently from North Ossetia, who subjected her to torture, calling her a fascist and forcing her to shout "Sieg Heil", repeatedly shooting pistols next to her ears and threatening to rape her. She was freed on August 28 after, Mark Franchetti, a reporter for the British newspaper The Sunday Times, and Dmitry Beliakov, a Russian freelance photographer, pleaded with leader Alexander Khodakovsky to release her. Khodakovsky ordered Iryna Dovhan freed and vowed to discipline those responsible for her detention and public humiliation. She has since left Donetsk and joined her family in Mariupol, a city then-controlled by Ukrainian forces.

== August 2014 incident ==
Dovhan became famous after photos of her made by Maurício Lima (published in The New York Times) appeared in social and international media, showing her standing at a busy intersection in downtown Donetsk holding a sign identifying her as a spy and reading: "She kills our children". She says passers-by slapped and kicked her, spit on her and hurled tomatoes at her face. A photograph of her mistreatment stirred widespread outrage in Ukraine, prompted a social media effort to identify her and drew the attention of United Nations human rights monitors.

The insurgents who abducted her are associated with the Vostok Battalion, led by former SBU operative Alexander Khodakovsky, accused her for being a spy and an artillery observer for the Armed Forces of Ukraine. Iryna Dovhan stated that she was never a spy, but she freely admits to being a volunteer who collected donations (food, clothes, medications, and money) from locals and delivered them to Ukrainian soldiers stationed nearby. She also says she wasn't the only person in Donetsk who helped Ukrainian soldiers through donations. She says that she made a fateful mistake when she took photos of soldiers receiving the collections, with the intention of showing them to people who donated the supplies.

In her interviews to Hromadske.tv and Radio Liberty, she stated that if it hadn't been for those pictures, she might not have ever seen her family again. The Ukrainian television program Vikna filmed an exclusive interview of Dovhan and her family. Dovhan met, thanked and hugged the photographer Maurício Lima, whose photograph drew wide attention to her plight.

=== Aftermath ===
After September 2014, Dovhan and her family started rebuilding their lives in Mariupol. They did not expect financial assistance from the Ukrainian government.

In the 2014 Ukrainian parliamentary election, Dovhan as a non-partisan candidate tried to win a parliament seat by winning a single-member districts in Slovyansk, but failed to do so after finishing 7th with 4.16% of the votes. Dovhan did not take part in the 2019 Ukrainian parliamentary election.

== Personal life ==
Iryna Dovhan is a professional beautician, a native of Yasynuvata and, until recently, a resident of the town. She studied economics and owned a beauty salon in her hometown, which was taken by rebels in April 2014. She is married and in 2014 had a 16-year-old daughter and a 32-year-old son.

== See also ==
- 2014 pro-Russian unrest in Ukraine
- List of kidnappings
- List of solved missing person cases (post-2000)
- War in Donbas (2014–2022)
