= Battle of Yasynuvata =

Series of battles in Yasynuvata

Battle for Yasynuvata
- Part of War in Donbas (2014–2022)
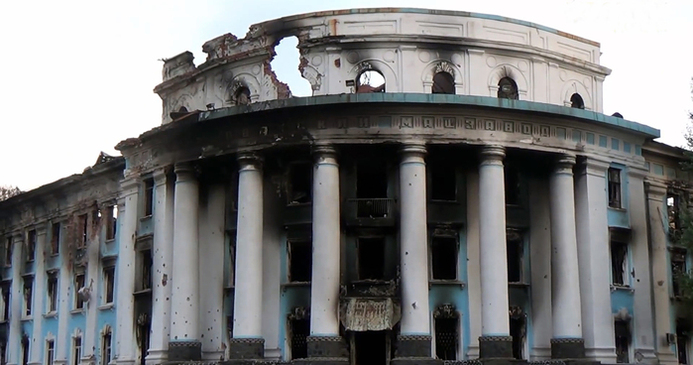
- Administrative building of a factory in Yasynuvata after the battle
Date	4 August 2014 — 17 September 2014
Location	Yasynuvata
Result	DPR victory: Retreat of Ukrainian forces from the city

Belligerents
Ukraine	Donetsk People's Republic

Units involved
Ukrainian Ground Forces: 93rd Mechanized Brigade; Ukrainian Air Assault Forces: 95th Air Assault Brigade; National Guard of Ukraine: "Jaguar"	Pro-Russian fighters

The Battle for Yasynuvata was a series of battles in the summer of 2014 for Yasynuvata in the Donbas region of Ukraine. Control over Yasynuvata was crucial in controlling the routes of communication between Donetsk and Horlivka.

== Events ==
During the battle, the city was captured by groups of pro-Russian militants.

=== Fights for city control ===
Released August 4, 2014. The next day, the city was handed over to the Donetsk People's Republic to avoid heavy casualties among the local population.

On August 17, this release was repeated by the 95th Brigade of the Armed Forces. However, the fighting on the outskirts continued, therefore, the final sweep of the city lasted for several days, fierce positional battles took place on August 18. During these battles died Mushta Maxim Alexandrovich — junior sergeant, special purpose regiment of NMU Yaguar and Kondratenko Vasyl Oleksiyovych, soldier, 95th brigade.

On 17 August 2014 a massive "Grad" shelling of the town center took place, causing severe damage and casualties. In 2019 Alexander Khodakovsky admitted in Russian media that it was actually Russian army and he gave the order to "get rid of Ukrainian soldiers" who were in the town.

=== Loss of checkpoint ===
On September 13-14, DPR militants attempted to knock Ukrainian troops out of their positions by forces of 1 tank, 3 armored personnel carriers and about 300 infantry under cover of jet and barrel artillery. ATO forces repulsed an attempt to break through the militants and rejected the enemy a few kilometers from the city, Andriy Lysenko: "The militants acted under cover of artillery and fire from the installations Grad.

September 17, Espresso TV with reference to the journalist Iintera Romana Bochkalu reported that the Ukrainian military lost control of the checkpoint near Yasinwy and retreated from the city for several kilometers. While the power of the helmet offers to the Donetsk People's Republic one better than the other under the „ achieved truce“, the Donetsk People's Republic continue to attack. Break through our line of defense. According to the fighters of the 93rd Brigade, today they lost control of the block post near Yasinwy. The Ukrainian military was forced to retreat for several kilometers as a result of the shelling of „ Gradami“, the impact of a tank group and the significant advantage of the enemy's living force. According to our fighters, the Chechens „ worked against them “.

=== Fights in the promzon ===
In March 2016, hostilities alongside Yasynuvata resumed as a result battles for control of the Donetsk highway — Konstantinovka.

== See also ==
- Russian occupation of Donetsk Oblast
