= Battle of Sievierodonetsk =

Battle of Sievierodonetsk may refer to:

- Battles of Sievierodonetsk (2014)
- Battle of Sievierodonetsk (2022)
