= Mark Franchetti =

Mark Franchetti is a journalist and documentary filmmaker. He worked for 23 years as a correspondent for the Sunday Times of London, much of it as the paper's Moscow correspondent. Fluent in five languages, Franchetti was awarded the British Press Award in 2003, after reporting on the Moscow theatre siege, when he entered the building twice during the hostage taking to interview the terrorists and a Foreign Press Association award in 2004 for his reports on the alleged abuse of Iraqi civilians by U.S Marines. He writes mainly about Russia and the former Soviet Union, has reported extensively on the conflict in Chechnya and covered the wars in Kosovo, Iraq, Afghanistan, Georgia, and Ukraine.

He works both in print and TV and has presented and produced several prime time documentaries. Among them are, “Terror in Moscow” for Britain's C4 which was shortlisted for a BAFTA. For the BBC: “Britain’s Most Wanted”, about Andrei Lugovoi, following the death by poisoning of Alexander Litvinenko. “Should We Be Scared of Russia”, a BBC Panorama after the war in Georgia. “The Berlusconi Show”, about the former Italian Prime Minister and “Italy’s Bloodiest Mafia”, an investigation into the Camorra. In 2013 he produced The Condemned, his first feature-length documentary, spending three weeks inside a remote Russian prison exclusively for murderers. With the start of the 2014 Russian aggression against Ukraine, he was involved in promoting armed militants in the east Ukraine "Vostok" calling them "brave and enthusiastic". In August of 2014 he was involved in freeing of Iryna Dovhan from detention of the Vostok battalion led by Alexander Khodakovsky. In 2015 Franchetti produced and co-directed Bolshoi Babylon, a feature-length documentary about the Bolshoi Theatre for HBO and the BBC. In 2019 he co-directed and co-produced a feature-length documentary about Tommaso Buscetta titled Our Godfather which was bought by Netflix.
