= Marynivka, Donetsk Oblast =

Marynivka Маринівка Мариновка
- Village
- Location of Marynivka Marynivka (Donetsk Oblast)
- Coordinates: 47°54′17″N 38°50′28″E
- Country: Ukraine
- Oblast: Donetsk Oblast
- Raion: Horlivka Raion
- Elevation: 217 m (712 ft)

Population (2001 census)
  - Total: 629
- Time zone: UTC+2 (EET)
  - Summer (DST): UTC+3 (EEST)
- Postal code: 86200
- Area code: +380 6255

Marynivka (Ukrainian: Маринівка) is a village in Horlivka Raion in Donetsk Oblast of eastern Ukraine.

== Demographics ==
Native language as of the Ukrainian Census of 2001:

- Ukrainian 88.71%
- Russian 10.81%
- German 0.16%
- Other 0.32%
