= Alexander Khodakovsky =

Military commander in rebel-held Ukraine territory

Lieutenant colonel Alexander Khodakovsky
- Александр Ходаковский
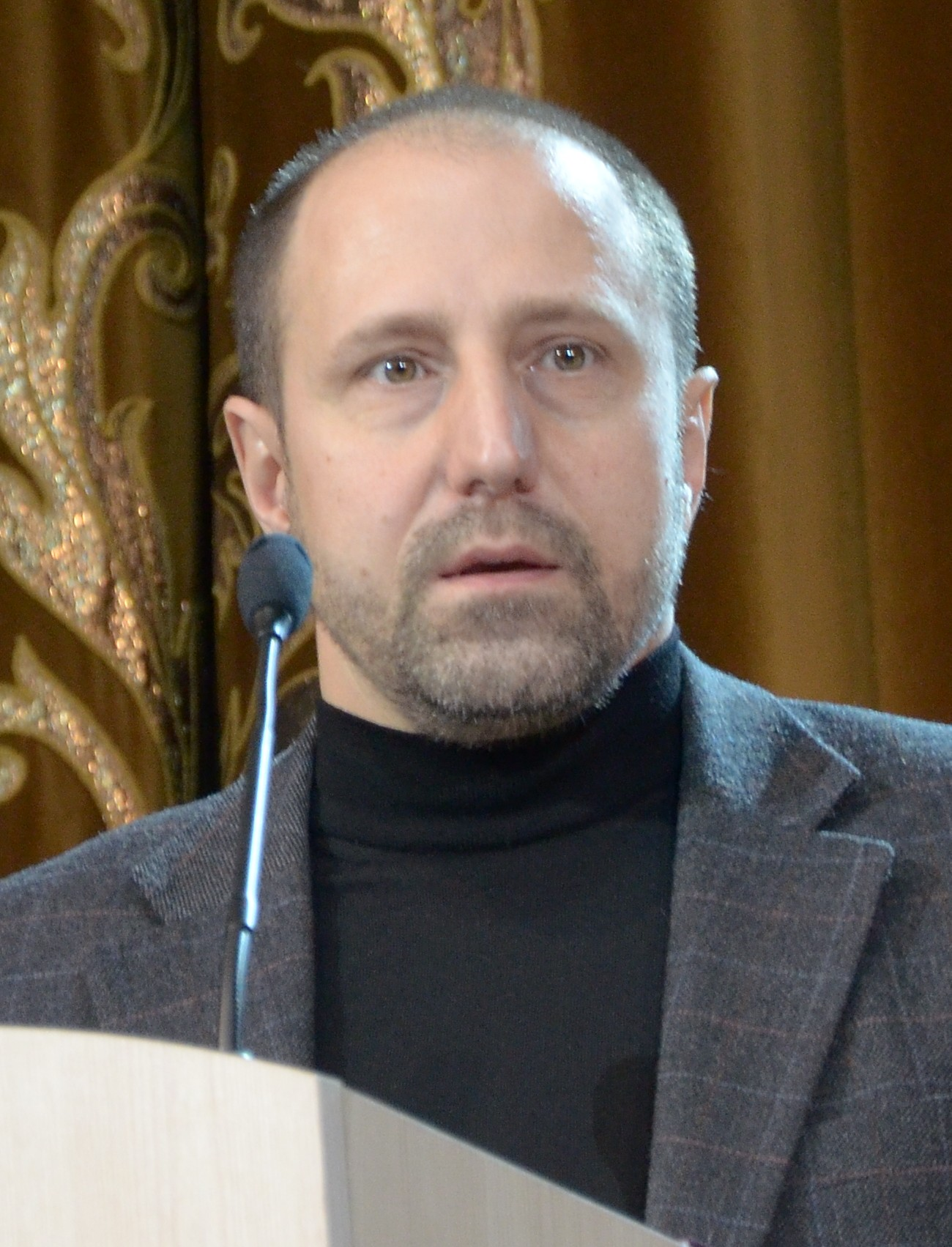
- Khodakovsky in 2014
- Born: 18 December 1972 (age 53); Donetsk, Ukrainian SSR, Soviet Union
- Military career
- Allegiance: Russia; Donetsk People's Republic; Ukraine (formerly)
- Branch: Vostok Brigade (from May 2014); Security Service of Ukraine: Alpha Group (until March 2014)
- Rank: Major general
- Conflicts: Russo-Ukrainian War; War in Donbas; Russian invasion of Ukraine; 2023 Ukrainian counteroffensive
- Other work: Donetsk People's Republic Deputy Prime Minister (May – July 2014); Donetsk People's Republic Security Minister (May 2014–2016)

Alexander Sergeevich Khodakovsky (Russian: Александр Сергеевич Ходаковский, IPA: [ɐlʲɪkˈsandr sʲɪrˈɡʲejɪvʲɪtɕ xədɐˈkofskʲɪj]) is a Russian separatist paramilitary commander who is the commander of the Vostok Brigade, which formed in early May 2014 during the early phases of the war in Donbas.

== Biography ==
Khodakovsky commanded a Donetsk detachment of Ukraine's anti-terrorism special forces unit Alpha, part of the Security Service of Ukraine (SBU). He and his unit were sent to Kyiv in January 2014 as part of the law enforcement response to the events of the Euromaidan. Khodakovsky led the Donetsk Alpha unit until mid-March 2014.

"I saw with my own eyes how extremist those demonstrators were, attacking the police and hurling petrol bombs at them... when Yanukovych was ousted, I understood they would come here to the east to fight. So I founded Vostok to fight them back."

=== War in Donbas ===
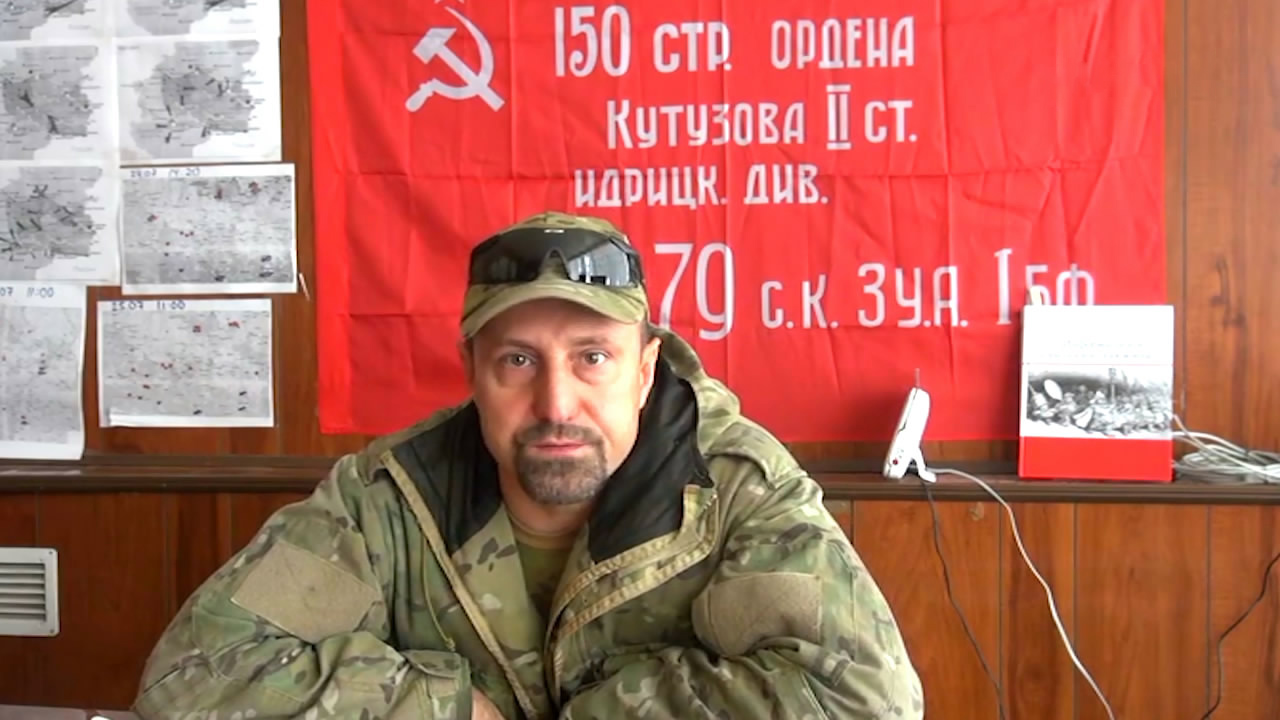
Khodakovsky giving a press conference during the war in Donbas

During the 2014 insurgency in Donbas, he defected and became the leader of the pro-Russian "Patriotic Forces of Donbas" in Donetsk Oblast. In early May 2014, he founded the Vostok Battalion.

Khodakovsky was strongly criticized, including by Igor Girkin, due to heavy casualties incurred in the course of Vostok's late May occupation of the Donetsk airport and early June attack on a Ukrainian border checkpoint at Marynivka. This led to his resignation as Security Minister of the Donetsk People's Republic on 16 July 2014. He was replaced by Vladimir Antyufeyev.

On 19 August 2014, reports began to emerge that Khodakovsky had been arrested by law enforcement agencies. It was later clarified by the Interior Ministry that it was Semyon Khodakovsky, a junior rebel commander, that had been detained.

As of 2015, Khodakovsky was head of the Donetsk People's Republic security council. In 2016, he was dismissed from his position as security council secretary due to interpersonal disputes.

In May 2018, Khodakovsky relocated to Russia, and in September 2018, he claimed that Russian border guards did not let him return to Donetsk.

==== Malaysia Airlines Flight 17 ====
On 23 July 2014, the international news agency Reuters reported Khodakovsky had in an interview confirmed that pro-Russian rebels had obtained a Buk missile system, which they used to shoot down Malaysia Airlines Flight 17 and then "probably" sent it back to Russia to remove proof of its presence.

This Reuters interview was quickly disputed by another rebel leader, Alexander Borodai. And Khodakovsky quickly denied having told Reuters that separatists possessed Buk missiles when the Malaysia airliner crashed in the region: "We were discussing theories but one simple phrase was cutting throughout like a red line that I do not have the information on militia possessing such kind of a weapon." Khodakovsky said he had told Reuters that he was not an expert and could not comment on the crash. Khodakovsky said he neither agreed with nor denied claims that rebels had shot down the plane. He only said that if Ukrainian authorities knew that the DPR allegedly possessed Buks, they should have banned civilian flights in the Donetsk airspace. Reuters said it stands by its story and produced an audio recording of part of the interview, in which a man who sounds like Khodakovsky confirms key comments made by Khodakovsky about the militia obtaining the Buk from Russia and using it to shoot down MH17.

In November 2014, he repeated his claim that the separatists had a Buk launcher at the time, but stated that the vehicle, under control of fighters from Luhansk, had still been on its way to Donetsk when MH17 crashed. It then retreated in order to avoid being placed under blame.

=== Full-scale Russian invasion of Ukraine ===
In December 2022, during the Russian invasion of Ukraine, he said that the only way Russia can win the war against Ukraine would be through the use of nuclear weapons.

==== 2023 counteroffensive ====
During the 2023 Ukrainian counteroffensive, Khodakovsky and the Vostok Brigade were in charge of defending the village of Urozhaine, on the border of the Donetsk and Zaporizhzhia Oblasts. The village was described by The New York Times as a "stronghold" and an important part of the Russian defensive network on the Velyka Novosilka axis. Despite this, Russian media and Khodakovsky himself made it clear that the strategically important village would be solely defended by the Vostok Brigade against elite detachments from the Ukrainian Marine Corps. Fighting for the village began on 6 August 2023, and Khodakovsky announced that the Vostok Brigade would be withdrawing from the village on 15 August, stating that their defensive position had become untenable. Ukraine announced the liberation of the settlement on 16 August, and has been noted using artillery to shell retreating members of the Vostok Brigade resulting in high casualties among Khodakovsky's troops.

In August 2023 Khodakovsky said that Russia would not be able to win the war militarily in the near term and that Russian forces would have difficulty occupying additional Ukrainian cities. He concluded that Russia would likely have to come to a "truce" and that Russia may enter a phase "of neither peace nor war" with Ukraine. Khodakovsky opined that Russia would be able to exert more influence over Ukraine in such a situation than in the current state of active war.

On February 21, 2025, Khodakovsky was promoted to major general of police.

=== Sanctions ===
Khodakovsky was sanctioned by the British government in 2014 in relation to the Russo-Ukrainian War.

== See also ==
- Iryna Dovhan
- Sanctions involving Russia
