= Mariupol =

City in Donetsk Oblast, Ukraine

Mariupol Маріуполь (Ukrainian)
- City
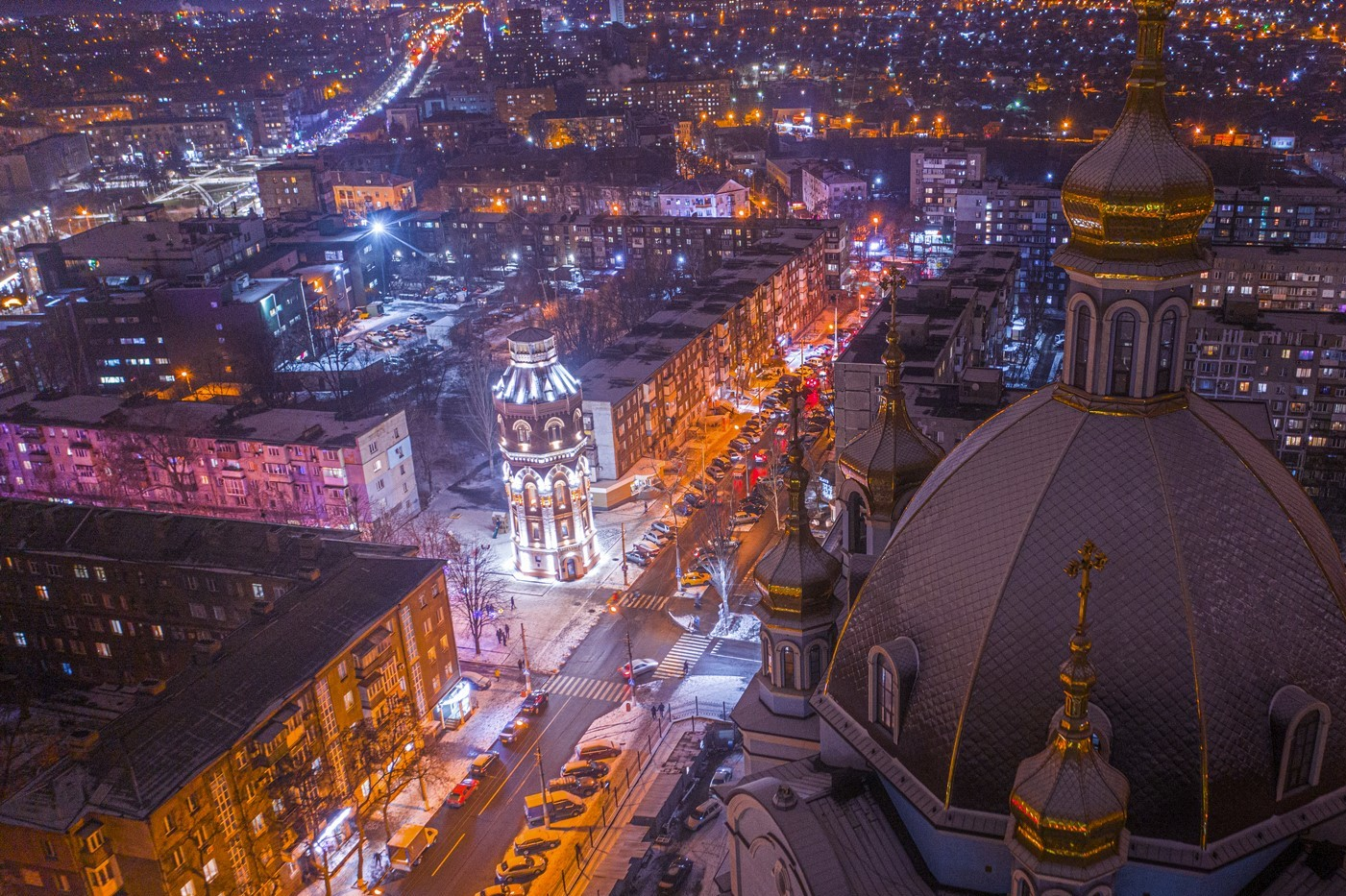
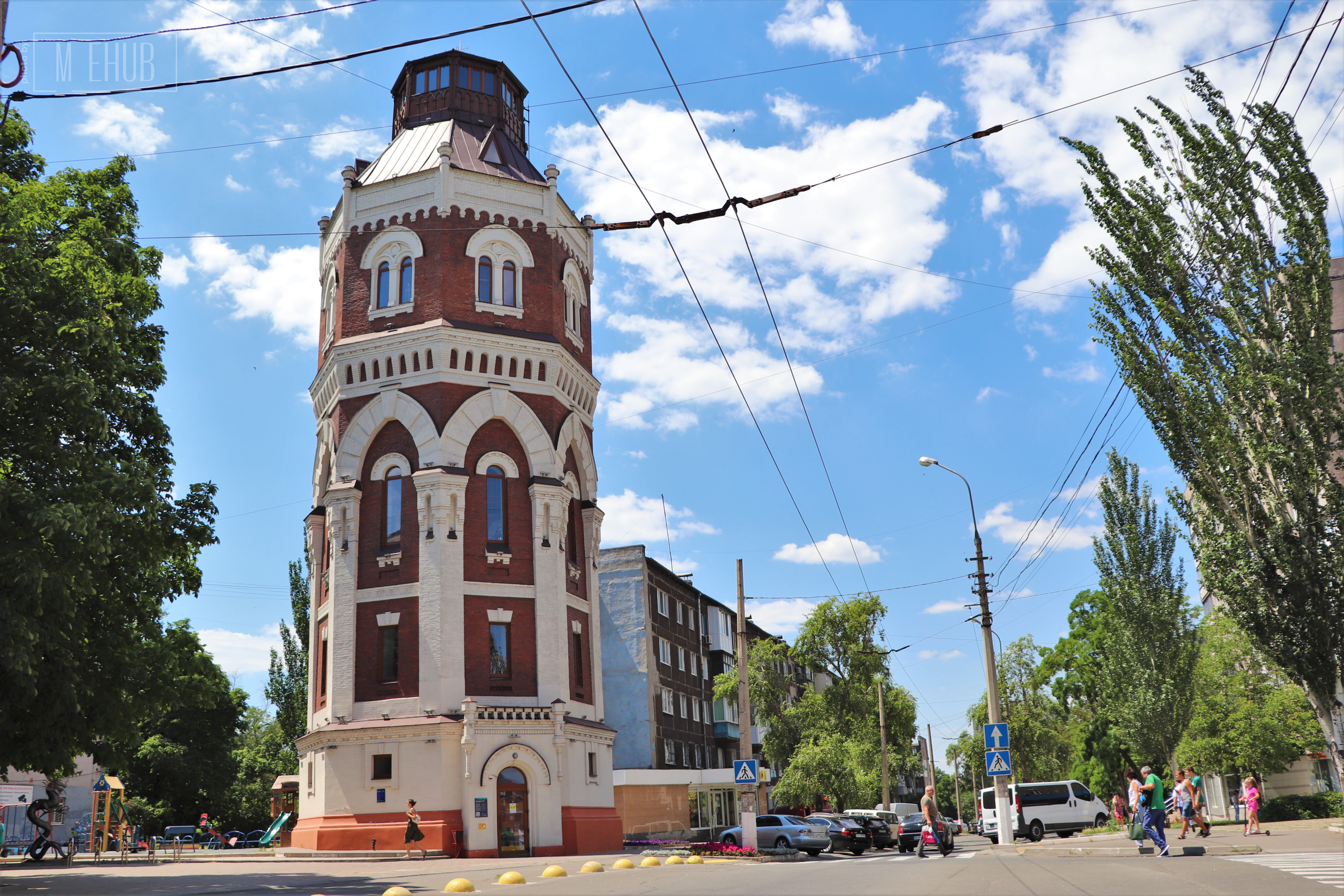
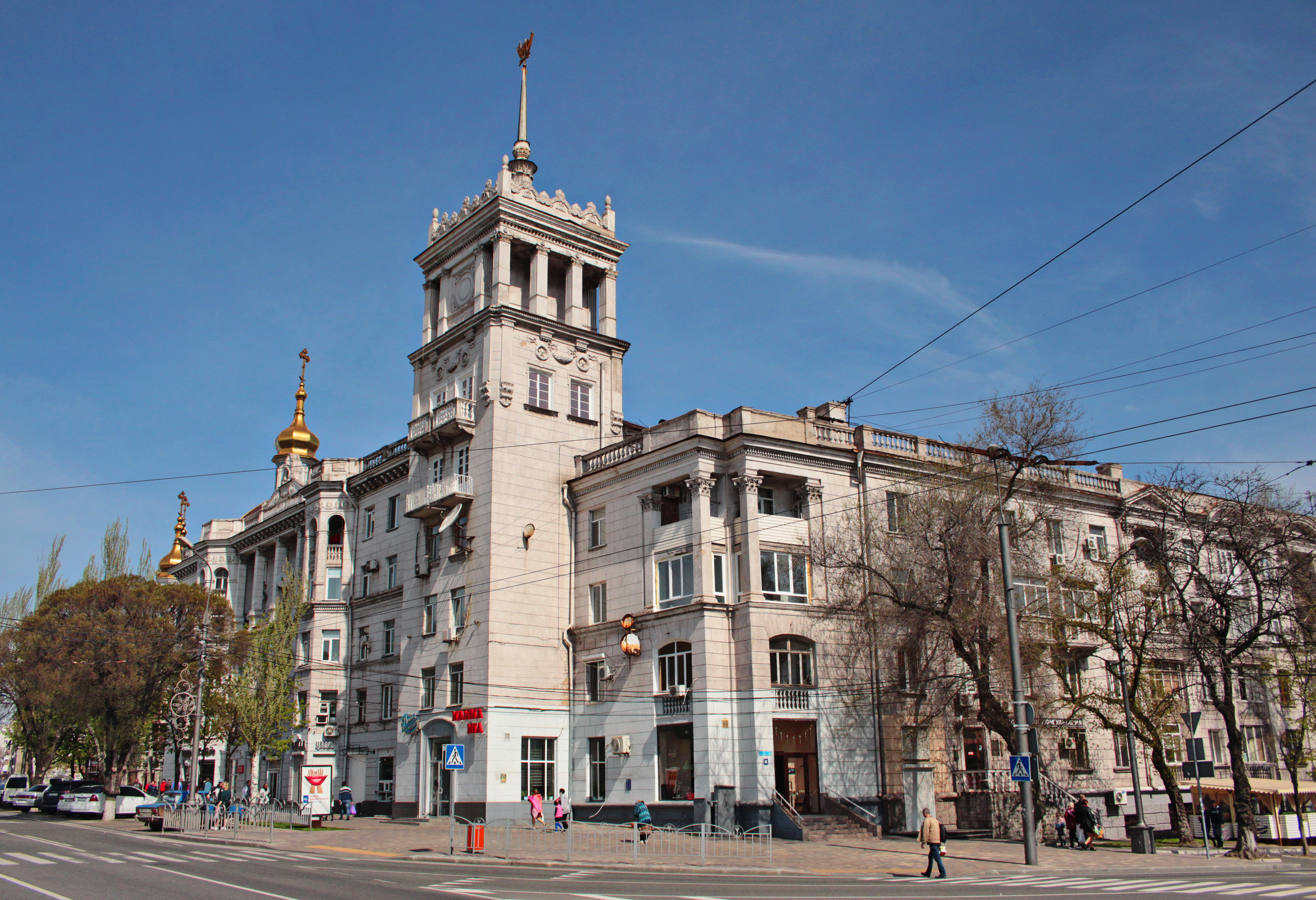
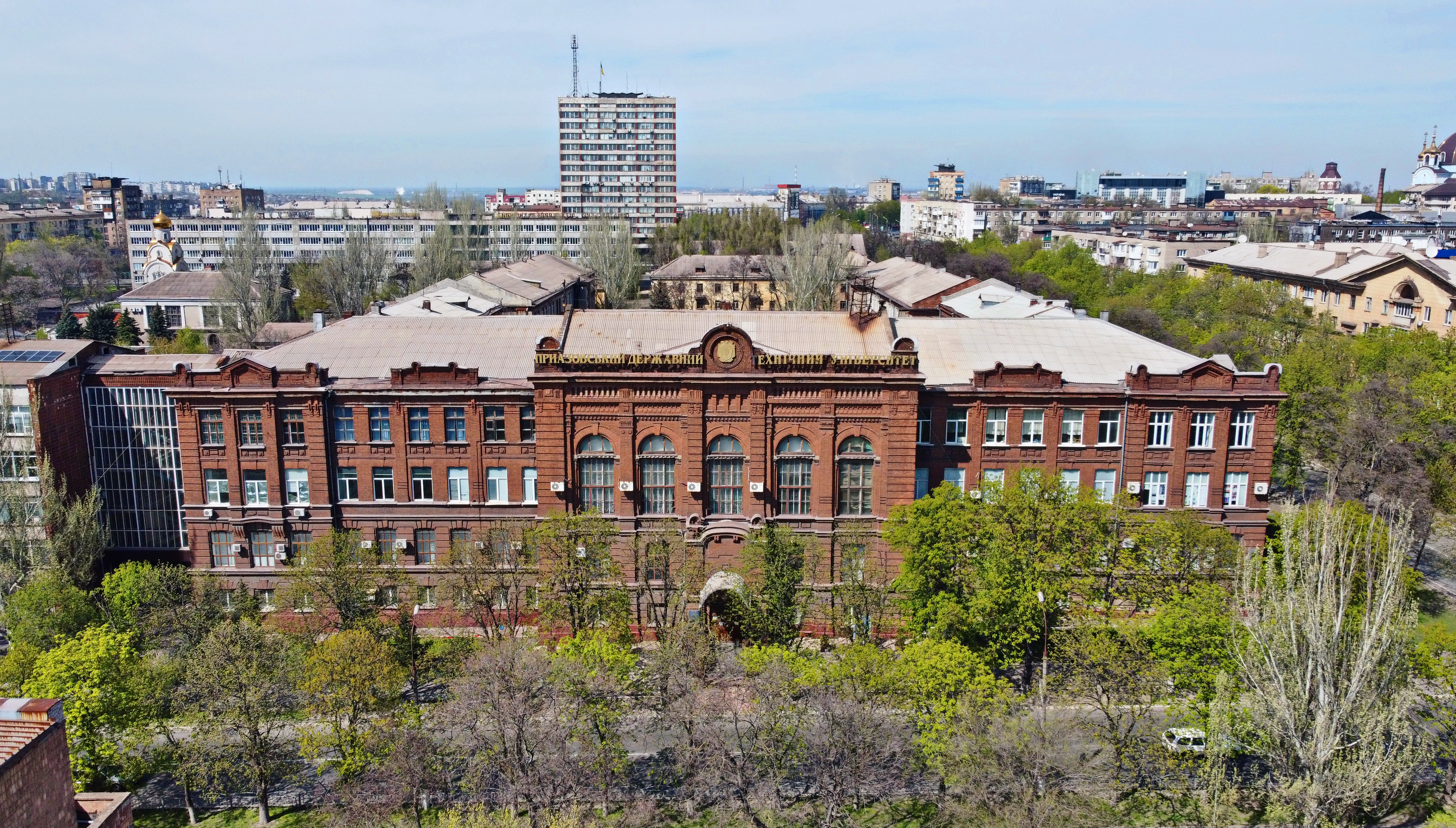
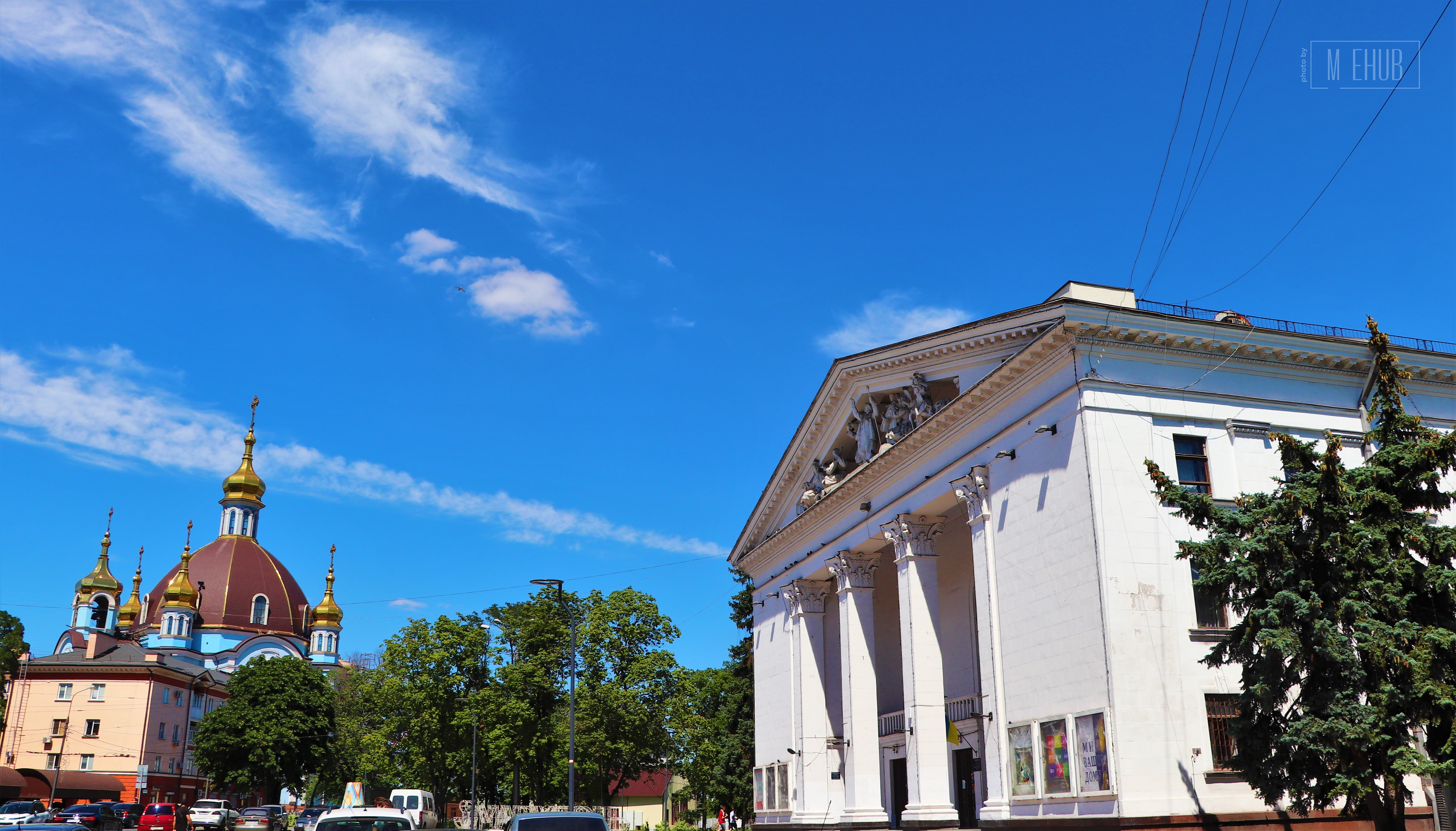
- From top to bottom and left to right: Night view of Mariupol in 2020; Old Tower; one of the houses with a spire; Pryazovskyi State Technical University; Donetsk Regional Drama Theatre

- Flag Coat of arms Brandmark
- Interactive map of Mariupol
- Mariupol shown within Donetsk Mariupol shown within Ukraine
- Coordinates: 47°5′45″N 37°32′58″E
- Country: Ukraine
- Oblast: Donetsk Oblast
- Raion: Mariupol Raion
- Hromada: Mariupol urban hromada
- Founded: 1778
- Urban districts: List of 4: Kalmiuskyi District; Livoberezhnyi District; Prymorskyi District; Tsentralnyi District

Government
  - Mayor: Vadym Boychenko (de jure); Oleg Morgun (de facto)

Area
  - Total: 244 km^{2} (94 sq mi)

Population (2023)
  - Total: 120,000 (per Ukraine)
- (May 2023, after 2022 Russian siege and attacks) before this, the January 2022 estimate was 425,681
- Postal code: 87500—87590
- Area code: +380 629
- Climate: Hot summer subtype
- Website: mariupolrada.gov.ua/en

Mariupol (Note: UK: /ˌmæriˈuːpɒl/ MARR-ee-OO-pol, US: /ˌmɑːriˈuːpəl/ MAR-ee-OO-pəl; Ukrainian: Маріуполь [mɐr⁽ʲ⁾iˈupolʲ]; Russian: Мариуполь, Russian pronunciation: [mərʲɪˈupəlʲ]; Greek: Μαριούπολη, romanized: Marioúpoli) is a city in Donetsk Oblast, Ukraine. It is situated on the northern coast (Pryazovia) of the Sea of Azov, at the mouth of the Kalmius River. In January 2022, prior to the Russian invasion of Ukraine, it was the tenth-largest city in the country and the second-largest city in Donetsk Oblast, with an estimated population of 425,681; in August 2023, Ukrainian authorities estimated the population of Mariupol at approximately 120,000.

Historically, the city was a centre for trade and manufacturing, and played a key role in the development of higher education and many businesses and also served as a coastal resort on the Sea of Azov. In 1948, it was renamed Zhdanov (Russian: Жданов) after Andrei Zhdanov, a native of the city who had become a high-ranking official of the Communist Party of the Soviet Union and a close ally to Joseph Stalin. The name was part of a larger effort to rename cities after high-ranking political figures in the Soviet Union. The historic name was restored in 1989.

Mariupol was founded on the site of a former encampment for Cossacks, known as Kalmius, and was granted city rights within the Russian Empire in 1778. It played a key role in Stalin-era industrialization; it was a centre for grain trade, metallurgy, and heavy engineering – including the Illich Iron and Steel Works and the Azovstal Iron and Steel Works.

The city was largely destroyed by Russian forces during the siege of Mariupol that lasted from 24 February 2022 until the last Ukrainian troops remaining in Mariupol surrendered at the Azovstal Iron and Steel Works on 16 May 2022, for which it was named a "Hero City of Ukraine" by the Ukrainian government. The Russian military secured complete control over the city by 20 May.

Within months, local Russian-backed authorities signed into law a sweeping new bill outlining the reconstruction of Mariupol, as a Russian city, up to the year 2035.

== History ==
=== Ancient history ===
Neolithic burial grounds excavated on the shore of the Sea of Azov date from the end of the third millennium BCE. Over 120 skeletons have been discovered, with stone and bone instruments, beads, shell-work, and animal teeth.

=== Crimean Khanate ===
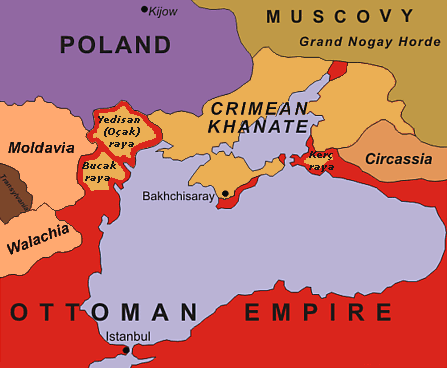
The Crimean Khanate in about 1600

From the 12th through the 16th century, the area around Mariupol was largely devastated and depopulated by intense conflict between the Crimean Tatars, the Nogay Horde, the Grand Duchy of Lithuania, and Muscovy. By the middle of the 15th century, much of the region north of the Black and Azov Seas was annexed by the Crimean Khanate and became a dependency of the Ottoman Empire. East of the Dnieper River a desolate steppe stretched to the Sea of Azov, where lack of water made early settlement precarious. Being near the Muravsky Trail exposed it to frequent Crimean–Nogai slave raids and plundering by Tatar tribes, preventing permanent settlement and keeping it sparsely populated, or even entirely uninhabited, under Tatar rule. Hence it was known as the Wild Fields or the 'Deserted Plains' (Campi Deserti in Latin).

=== Cossack period ===
In this region of Eurasian steppes, the Cossacks emerged as a distinct people in the late fifteenth and early sixteenth centuries. Below the Dnieper Rapids were the Zaporozhian Cossacks, freebooters organized into small, loosely-knit, and highly mobile groups who were both livestock farmers and nomads. The Cossacks would regularly penetrate the steppe to fish and hunt, as well as for migratory farming and to herd livestock. Their independence from governmental and landowner authority attracted to join them many peasants and serfs fleeing the Polish–Lithuanian Commonwealth and Grand Duchy of Moscow.

The Treaty of Constantinople in 1700 further isolated the region, as it stipulated that there should be no settlements or fortifications on the coast of the Azov Sea to the mouth of the Mius River. In 1709, in response to a Cossack alliance with Sweden against Russia, Tsar Peter the Great ordered the liquidation of the Zaporozhian Sich, and their complete and permanent expulsion from the area. In 1733, Russia was preparing for a new military campaign against the Ottoman Empire and therefore allowed the return of the Zaporozhians, although the territory officially belonged to Turkey.

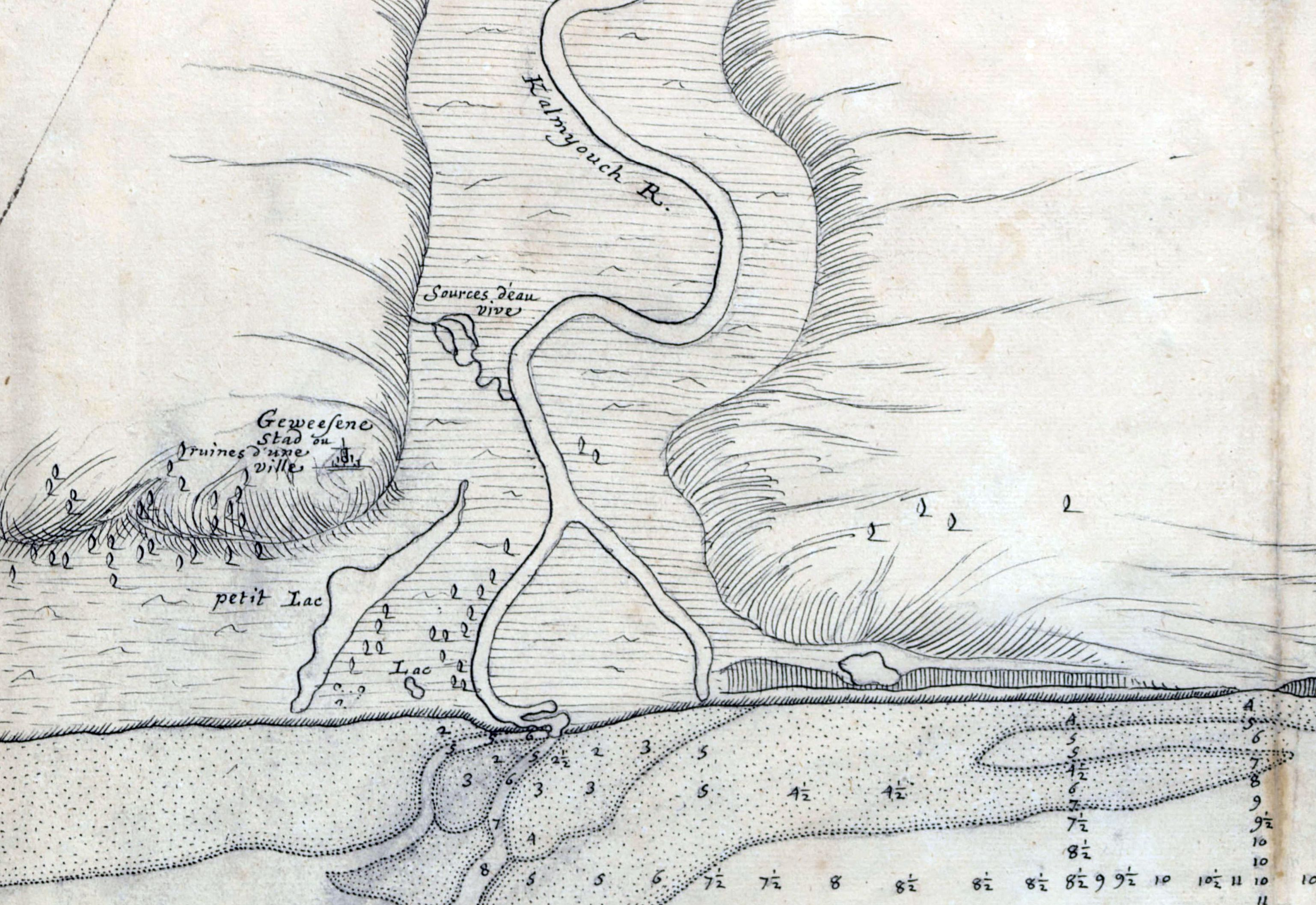
Map of the mouth of the Kalmius River from 1702

Under the Agreement of Lubny of 1734, the Zaporozhians regained all their former lands, and in return, were to serve in the Russian army in war. They were also permitted to build a new stockade on the Dnieper River called New Sich, though the terms prohibited them from erecting fortifications. These terms allowed only for living quarters, in Ukrainian called kureni.

Upon their return, the Zaporozhian population in these lands was extremely sparse, so effort to establish a measure of control, they introduced a structure of districts or palankas. The nearest district to modern Mariupol was the Kalmius District, but its border did not extend to the mouth of the Kalmius River, although this area had been part of its migratory territory. After 1736, the Zaporozhian Cossacks and the Don Cossacks (whose capital was at nearby Novoazovsk) came into conflict over the area, until Tsarina Elizabeth issued a decree in 1746 declaring the Kalmius River the dividing line between the two Cossack hosts.

Sometime after 1738, the treaties of Belgrade and Niš in 1739, in addition to the Russian-Turkish convention of 1741, as well as the following likely concurrent land survey of 1743–1746 (resulting in the demarcation decree of 1746), the Zaporzhian Cossacks established a military outpost on "the high promontory on the right bank of the Kalmius river." Though the details of its construction and history are obscure, excavations have revealed Cossack artifacts, including others, within the enclosure being approximately 120 square meters in the shape of a square. The outpost was likely a modest structure in that it lay within the territory of the Ottoman Empire, and the erection of fortifications on the Sea of Azov was prohibited by the Treaty of Niš.

The last Tatar raid, launched in 1769, covered a vast area, overrunning the New Russian Province with a huge army in severe wintertime weather. The raid destroyed the Kalmius fortifications and burned all the Cossack winter lodgings. In 1770, the Russian government, during the war with Turkey, moved its border with the Crimean Khanate southwest by more than two hundred kilometres. This action initiated the Dnieper fortified line (running from today's Zaporizhzhia to Novopetrovka), thereby laying claim to the region, including the site of future Mariupol, from the Ottoman Empire.

Following the victory of the Russian forces, the Treaty of Küçük Kaynarca eliminated the endemic threat from Crimea. In 1775, Zaporizhzhia was incorporated into the New Russian Governorate, and part of the land claimed behind the Dnieper fortified line including modern Mariupol was incorporated in the newly re-established Azov Governorate.

=== Russian Empire and Soviet Union ===
After the Russo-Turkish War from 1768 to 1774, the governor of the Azov Governorate, Vasily A. Chertkov, reported to Grigory Potemkin on 23 February 1776 that ruins of ancient domakhas (homes) had been found in the area, and in 1778 he planned the new town of Pavlovsk. However, on 29 September 1779, the city of Marianοpol (Greek: Μαριανόπολη) in Kalmius County was founded on the site. For the Russian authorities the city was named after the Russian Empress Maria Feodorovna; its de facto title came from after the Greek settlement of Mariampol, a suburb of Bakhchysarai in Crimea. The name was derived from the Hodegetria icon of the Holy Theotokos and the Virgin Mary. Subsequently, in 1780, Russian authorities forcibly relocated many Orthodox Greeks from Crimea to the Mariupol area, in what is known as the Eviction of Christians from the Crimea.

In 1782, Mariupol was an administrative seat of its county in the Azov Governorate of the Russian Empire, with 2,948 inhabitants. In the early 19th century, a customs house, a church-parish school, a port authority building, a county religious school, and two privately founded girls' schools were built. By the 1850s the population had grown to 4,600 and the city had 120 shops and 15 wine cellars. In 1869, consuls and vice-consuls of Prussia, Sweden, Norway, Austria-Hungary, the Roman States, Italy, and France established their representative offices in Mariupol.

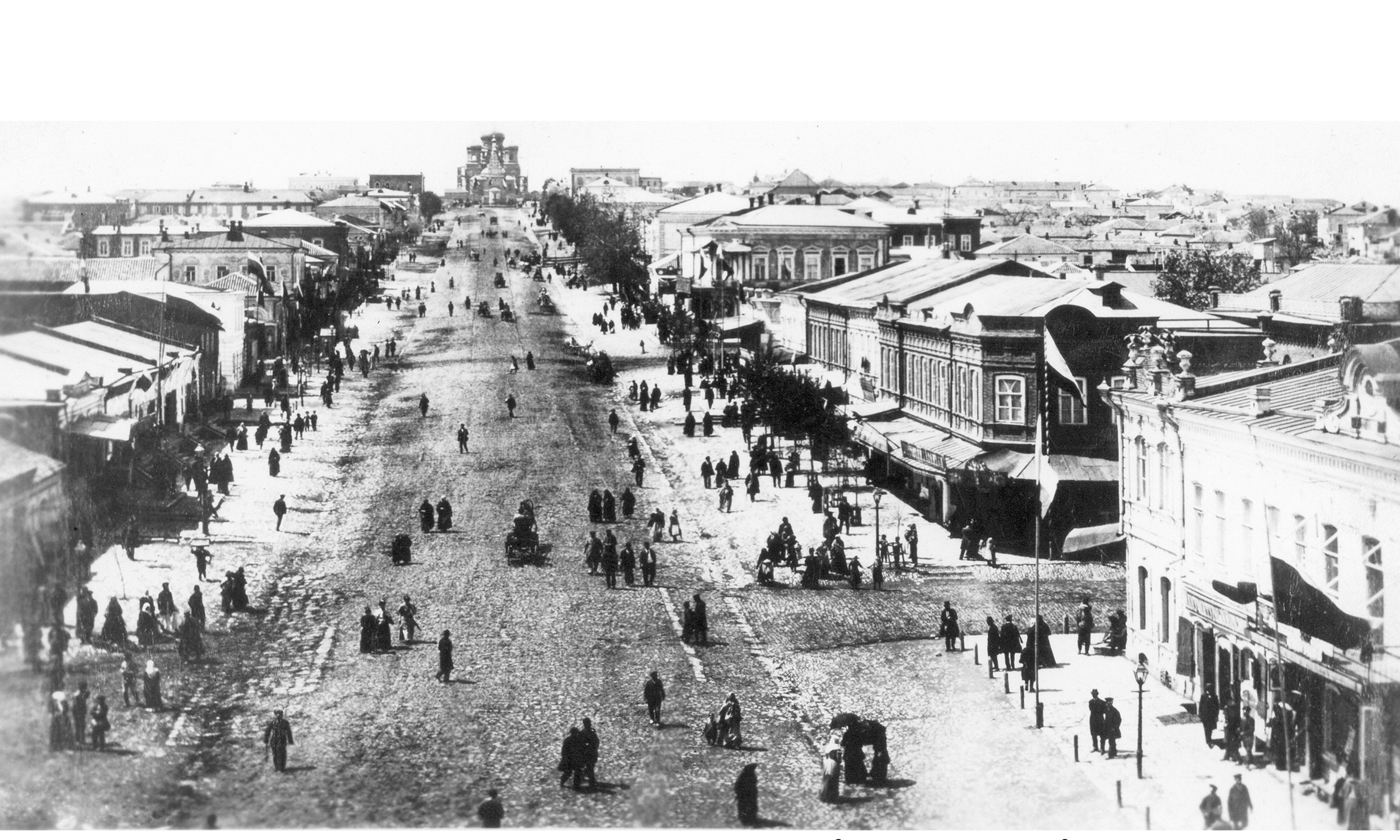
Mariupol in 1910

After the construction of the railway line from Yuzovka (later Stalino and Donetsk) to Mariupol in 1882, much of the wheat grown in the Yekaterinoslav Governorate and coal from the Donets Basin were exported via the port of Mariupol (the second largest in the South Russian Empire after Odesa), which served as a key funding source for opening a hospital, public library, electric power station and urban water supply system.

Mariupol remained a local trading centre until 1898, when the Belgian subsidiary SA Providence Russe opened a steelworks in Sartana, a village near Mariupol (now the Ilyich Steel & Iron Works). The company incurred heavy losses and by 1902 was bankrupt, owing 6 million francs to the Providence company and needing to be re-financed by the Banque de l'Union Parisienne. The mills brought cultural diversity to Mariupol as immigrants, mostly peasants from all over the empire, moved to the city looking for a job and a better life. The number of workers increased to 5,400.

In 1914, the population of Mariupol reached 58,000. However, the period from 1917 onwards saw a continuous decline in population and industry due to the Bolshevik Revolution of 1917 and the subsequent Russian Civil War. During the Ukrainian War of Independence, from 1917 to 1920, it passed between various factions. Afterwards, it was administratively part of the Donets Governorate of Ukraine. In 1933, a new steelworks (Azovstal) was built along the Kalmius River.

=== World War II ===
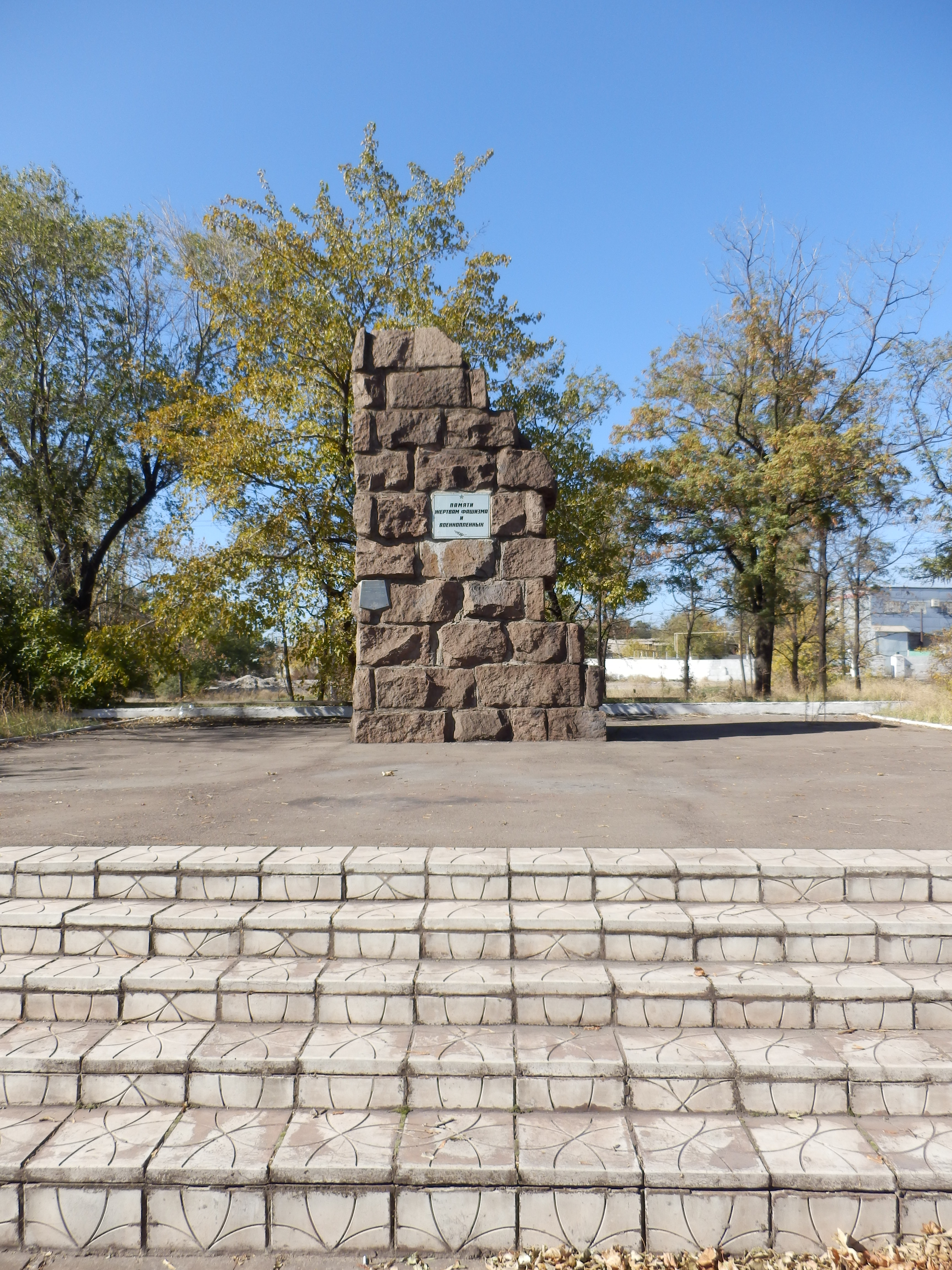
Monument to the victims of the Second World War.

During World War II, the city was under German military occupation from 8 October 1941, to 10 September 1943. During this time, the city suffered tremendous material damage and great loss of life. The Germans shot approximately 10,000 inhabitants, sent nearly 50,000 young men and girls as forced laborers to Germany and deported 36,000 prisoners to concentration camps.

During the occupation, the Germans focused on "the complete and quick destruction" of Mariupol's Jewish population, as part of the Holocaust. The execution of the Jews of Mariupol was carried out by Sonderkommando 10A, which was part of Einsatzgruppe D. The leader was Obersturmbannführer Heinz Seetzen. The Germans shot about 8,000 Mariupol Jews from 20 October 1941, to 21 October 1941. By 21 November 1941, Mariupol was declared Jew-free.

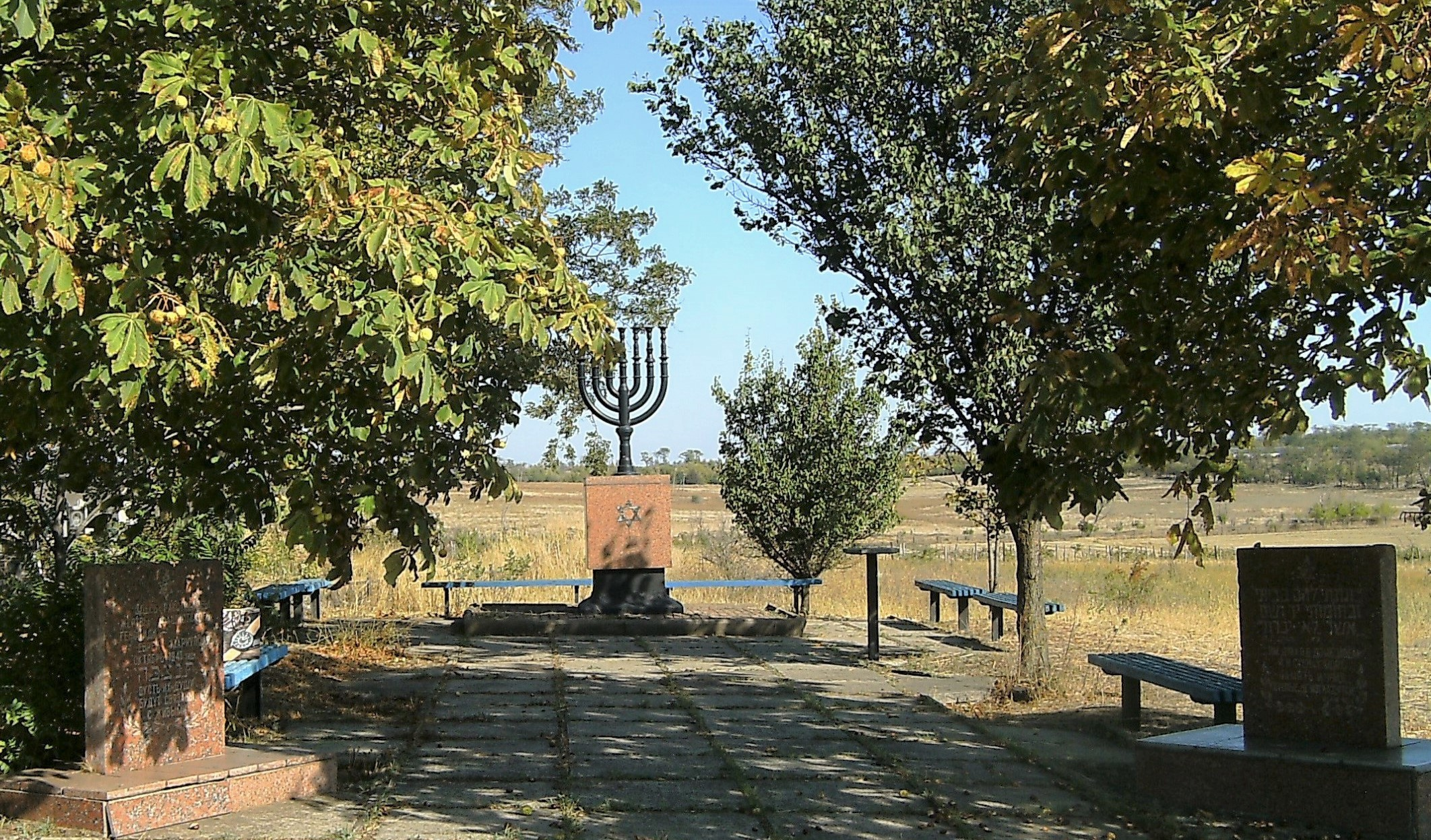
The Memorial to the Murdered Jews of Mariupol, also called "Menorah memorial"

The "Menorah memorial", or officially, the Mariupol Memorial to the Murdered Jews is installed in a suburb of Mariupol in memory to the murdered Jews of the city. The work consists of a seven-pointed menorah, a Star of David and two commemorative steles with inscriptions in Russian:

Victims of the fascist genocide were shot here – the Jews of Mariupol. October 1941. May their souls be connected with the living (Note: Russian: Здесь расстреляны жертвы фашистского геноцида – евреи Мариуполя. Октябрь 1941 года. Пусть их души будут связаны с живыми)

I will give in my house and within my walls a place and a name preferable to sons and daughters; I will give them an eternal name” (Isaiah 56:5)

The Choral Synagogue of Mariupol was reportedly undamaged during the hostilities. Reportedly, the Germans opened a hospital in the building, and when they retreated, tried to set fire to it.

The Germans operated four transit camps for prisoners of war in Mariupol, consecutively Dulag 152 in 1941–1942, Dulag 172 in 1942, Dulag 190 in 1942–1943 and Dulag 201 in 1943, as well a subcamp of the Stalag 368 POW camp in 1943. Mariupol was liberated by the Soviet Red Army on 10 September 1943.

In 1948, Mariupol was renamed "Zhdanov", after the recently deceased close Stalin ally Andrei Zhdanov, who had been born in the city. The historic name of the city "Mariupol" was restored in 1989 after a popular grassroots movement advocated for the name change.

=== Russo-Ukrainian War ===
==== War in Donbas and economic downturn ====
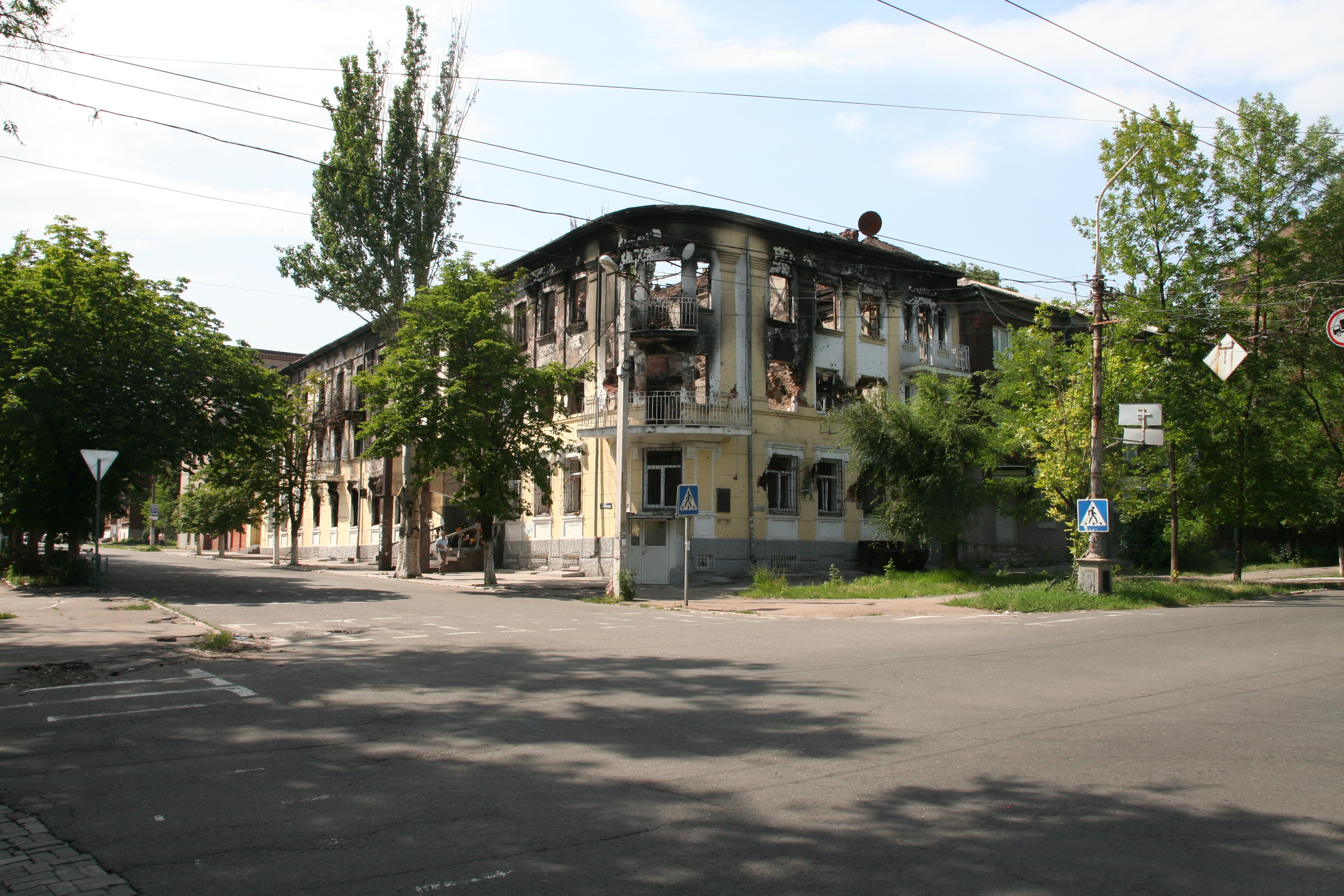
A police station burned out as a result of the clashes in 2014

Following the Ukrainian Revolution of Dignity in 2014, pro-Russian movements and protests erupted across eastern Ukraine, including Mariupol. This unrest later evolved into the Russo-Ukrainian War between the Ukrainian government and Russia together with the separatist forces of the self-proclaimed Donetsk People's Republic (DPR). In May of that year, a battle between the two sides broke out in Mariupol after it briefly came under DPR control. On 13 June 2014, the city was recaptured by government forces, and, in June 2015, Mariupol was proclaimed the temporary administrative centre of Donetsk Oblast until the city of Donetsk could be recaptured by the Ukrainian forces.

The city remained peaceful until the end of August 2014, when DPR separatists together with a detachment of the Russian Armed Forces captured Novoazovsk, located 45 kilometres (28 mi) east of Mariupol near the Russo-Ukrainian border. This followed an offensive by pro-Russian forces from the east, which came within 16 kilometres (10 mi) of Mariupol, before an overnight counter-offensive pushed the separatists away from the city. In September, the two sides agreed to a ceasefire, halting that offensive. Minor skirmishes continued on the outskirts of Mariupol in the following months.

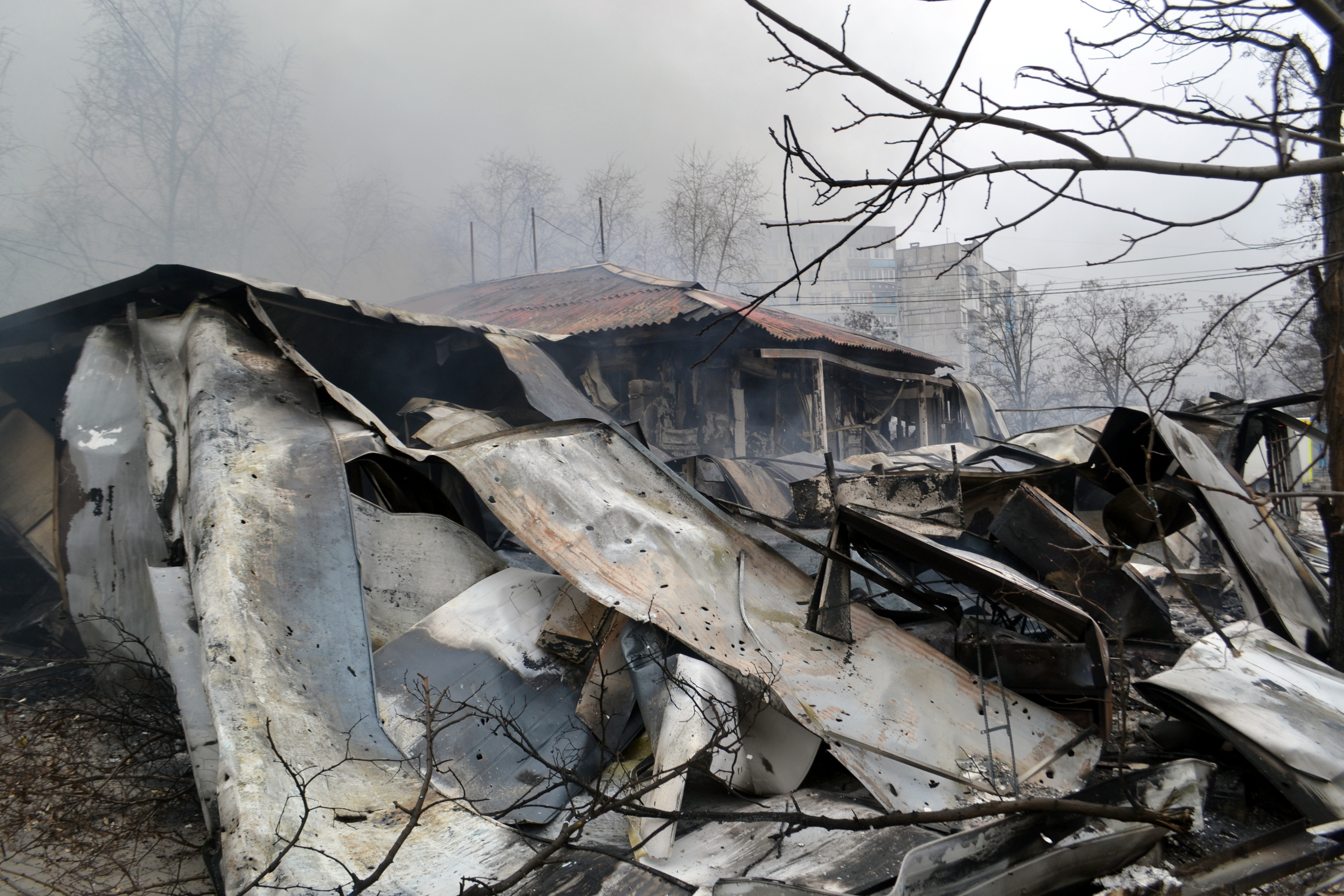
Aftermath of the January 2015 rocket attack on Mariupol

A rocket attack on Mariupol was launched on 24 January 2015 by the Donetsk People's Republic, from the village of Shyrokyne around 12 kilometres (7.5 mi) east of Mariupol city limits. Grad rockets fired by separatist forces hit residential areas of Mariupol, killing at least 30 people. A Bellingcat investigative team concluded that the shelling was instructed, directed and supervised by Russian military commanders in active service with the Russian Ministry of Defence. The attack exposed the city's vulnerability to separatist attacks. As a result, in February 2015, Ukrainian forces launched a surprise assault on Shyrokyne, forcing the separatists out from Shyrokyne and neighbouring villages by July 2015.

In May 2018, the Crimean Bridge was opened, linking mainland Russia to Crimea, which had been annexed in 2014 in the opening stages of the Russo-Ukrainian War. Russia "dramatically increased" the number of armed vessels in the Kerch Strait in 2018, and cargo ships bound for Mariupol found themselves subject to inspections by Russian authorities, resulting in delays of up to a week. Therefore, Mariupol port workers were put on a four-day week schedule. On 26 October 2018, The Globe and Mail reported that the bridge had reduced Ukrainian shipping from its Azov Sea ports (including Mariupol) by about 25%.

==== 2022 Russian siege ====
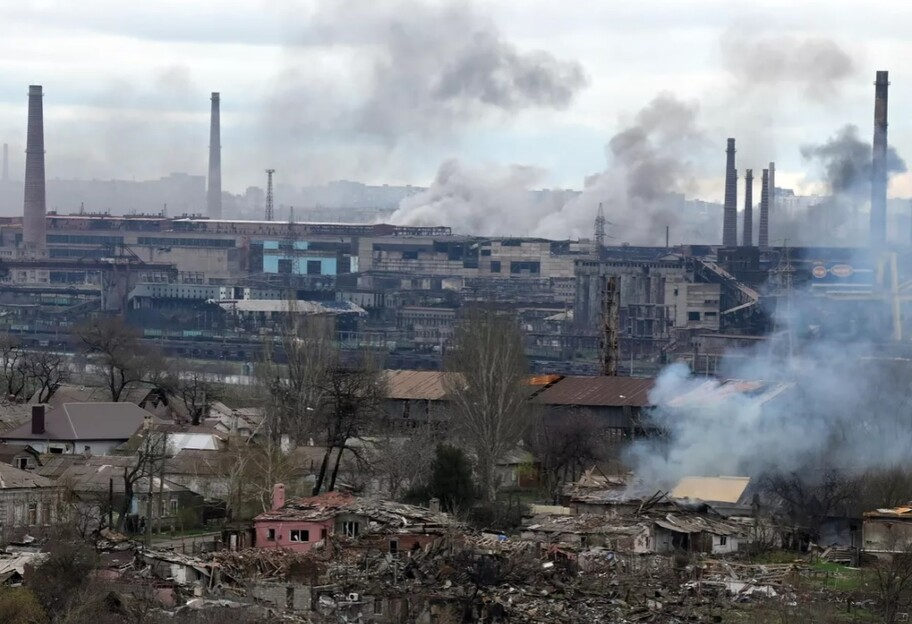
The Azovstal Iron and Steel Works during the siege of Mariupol

During the full-scale Russian invasion of Ukraine of 2022, Mariupol was a strategic target for Russian forces and their proxies. It came under artillery bombardment on the first day of the invasion, and was placed under siege by Russian forces. By early March, a severe humanitarian crisis developed in the city, which a Red Cross worker later described as "apocalyptic", citing food shortages, severe damage to infrastructure, and a lack of sanitation. The siege was marked by war crimes committed by Russian forces, most notably a Russian airstrike on a maternity hospital, and a second strike on Mariupol Theater, which was being used as a air raid shelter by hundreds of civilians at the time of the strike.

By late April, Russian and separatist troops had pushed deep into most of the city. They separated Ukrainian troops from the remaining defenders of the Azovstal Iron and Steel Works, which contained a complex of bunkers and tunnels. The Ukrainians besieged in Azovstal held out until 16 May 2022, when the last troops in the plant surrendered, and the city fell into Russian control.

The United Nations (UN) and the Ukrainian authorities estimated that up to 90% of Mariupol's residential buildings had been damaged or destroyed. Estimates for the number of civilians killed ranged from the UN's list of 1,348 confirmed deaths to the Ukrainian's claim of over 25,000. Ukrainian President Volodymyr Zelenskyy awarded Mariupol the title of Hero City of Ukraine due to Ukrainian forces' "valiant defense" of the city.

==== Occupation ====
In the months after they took control of the city, Russian authorities had many damaged buildings torn down, sometimes evicting the remaining residents. Some new housing was also built. Associated Press described this ongoing process as an effort to "eradicat[e] all vestiges of Ukraine" and to cover up "the evidence of war crimes". Local schools started using a Russian curriculum, the television and radio broadcasts switched to Russian, and many street names were reverted to their Soviet-era names. The latter was especially controversial, as the Ukrainian authorities restored many historic names during the decommunization process, all of which predated the Soviet Union. Among other toponyms, "Freedom Square" was renamed "Lenin Square".

In March 2023, Russian president Vladimir Putin made his first visit to Mariupol where he saw both the level of destruction and ongoing reconstruction work.

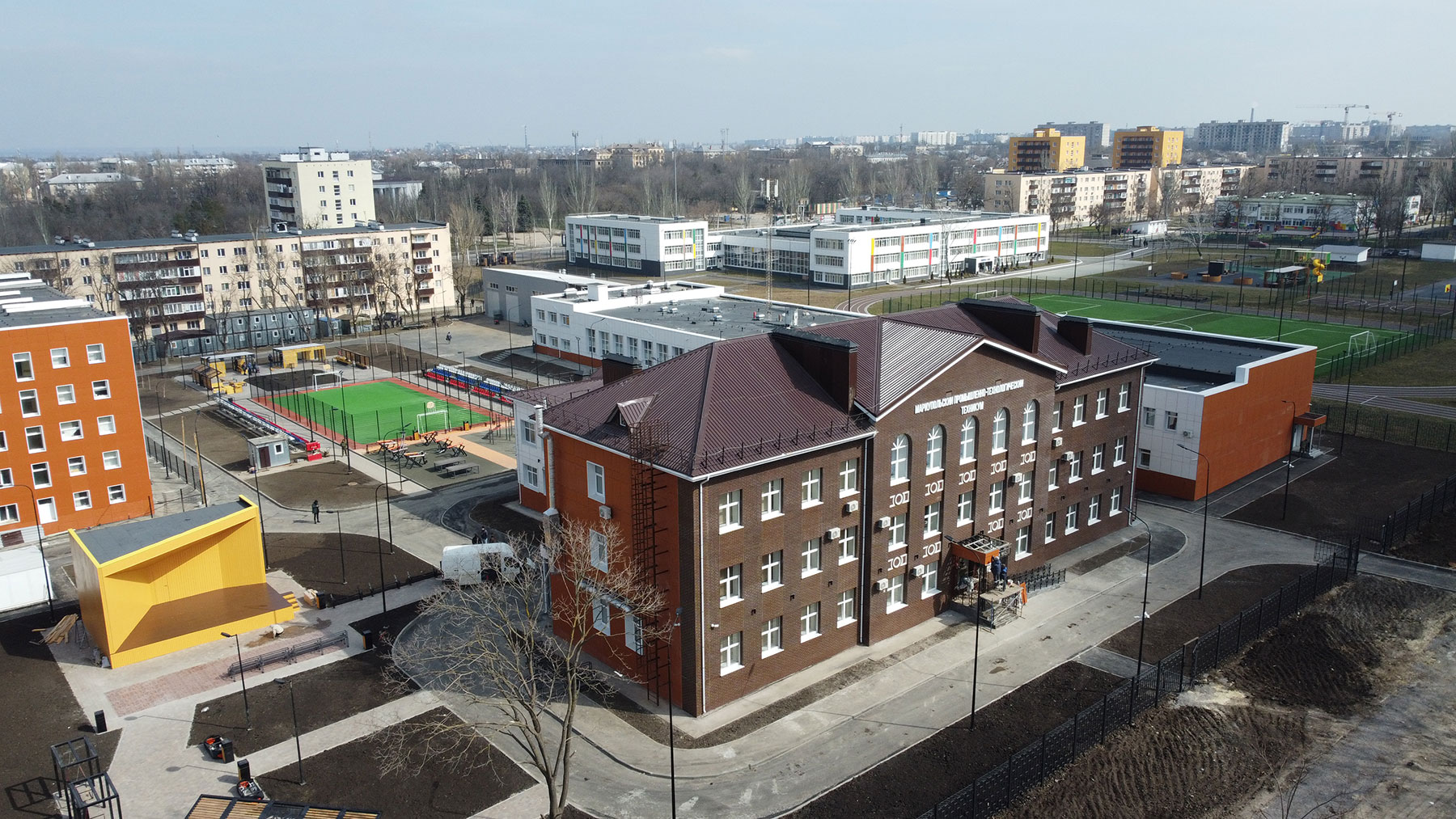
Russian press picture of Mariupol in 2024 following Russian occupation and renovation

In August 2023, the Institute for the Study of War reported that the Ukrainian Resistance Center had claimed to have gained access to documents detailing Russian plans to conduct a decade-long ethnic cleansing campaign in occupied Mariupol. The ISW reported that the depopulation of Ukrainians through deportation and Russian efforts to attract Russian citizens to move to the city is likely to be an ethnic cleansing campaign in addition to being apparent violations of the Convention on the Prevention and Punishment of the Crime of Genocide.

The 2023 Ukrainian documentary about the siege, 20 Days in Mariupol, won the 2024 Academy Award for Best Documentary Feature Film.

The estimates of the pre-war population that remained in the city in 2024 varies from 80,000 to 120,000. Since the invasion is estimated to have damaged over 90% of housing in the city centre, the Russian government has invested significant amounts towards building new buildings. This process has included demolishing many damaged buildings, whose remaining residents are sometimes not allowed into the rebuilt buildings, and are offered new property further from the city centre with little compensation. Property prices are similar to before the war, with the Russian government maintaining mortgages at 2% to draw in Russian buyers. According to a Ukrainian official, they numbered around 80,000 as of mid-2024. In early 2024, the Russian government began a process to seize properties from those who had fled, requiring owners to obtain Russian citizenship and re-register properties with Russian authorities in person in order to keep them. 514 apartments were declared ownerless in May.

In February 2024, the Financial Times investigated Mariupol under Russian occupation. The Russians want to show their process of rebuilding and "Russifying" the city. Russian businessmen were profiting from contracts, but locals were living in half-built homes, with poor construction work plaguing dozens of apartment blocks across the city.

In November 2024, Ukrainian MP Maxym Tkachenko said that around one third of the estimated 200,000 people that fled Mariupol during the city's siege had returned to living in the city, primarily due to inadequate government support when living elsewhere. A day later, he said that "There is no such data. It was my unfounded and emotional assumption."

In April 2026, The Kyiv Independent reported that Mariupol's city council, operating in exile, had published satellite images indicating that a site that was reportedly used to establish mass graves in 2022 was being destroyed.

== Geography ==
Mariupol is located in the south of the Donetsk Oblast, on the coast of Sea of Azov and at the mouth of Kalmius River. It is located in an area of the Azov Lowland that is an extension of the Ukrainian Black Sea Lowland. To the east of Mariupol is the Khomutov Steppe, which is also part of the Azov Lowland, located on the border with Russia.

The city occupies an area of 166 km^{2} (64 sq mi), or 244 km^{2} (94 sq mi) including suburbs administered by the city council. The downtown area is 106 km^{2} (41 sq mi), while the area of parks and gardens is 80.6 km^{2} (31.1 sq mi).

The city is mainly built on land made of solonetzic (sodium enriched) chernozem, with a significant amount of underground subsoil water, that frequently leads to landslides.

=== Climate ===
Mariupol has a humid continental climate (Köppen climate classification Dfa) with warm summers and cold winters. The average annual precipitation is 511 millimetres (20 in). Agroclimatic conditions allow the cultivation of warmth-loving agricultural crops with long vegetative periods (sunflower, melons, grapes, etc.). However water resources in the region are insufficient, so ponds and water basins are used for the needs of the population and industry.

In winter, the wind blows mainly from the east, and in summer the north.

Climate data for Mariupol (1991–2020, extremes 1955–present)
Month	Jan	Feb	Mar	Apr	May	Jun	Jul	Aug	Sep	Oct	Nov	Dec	Year
Record high °C (°F)	12.0 (53.6)	15.0 (59.0)	20.7 (69.3)	30.0 (86.0)	33.9 (93.0)	37.0 (98.6)	37.8 (100.0)	38.0 (100.4)	34.4 (93.9)	27.1 (80.8)	18.0 (64.4)	14.1 (57.4)	38.0 (100.4)
Mean daily maximum °C (°F)	0.0 (32.0)	0.7 (33.3)	6.1 (43.0)	13.6 (56.5)	20.5 (68.9)	25.5 (77.9)	28.3 (82.9)	27.9 (82.2)	21.6 (70.9)	14.1 (57.4)	6.3 (43.3)	1.5 (34.7)	13.8 (56.8)
Daily mean °C (°F)	−2.4 (27.7)	−2.0 (28.4)	2.8 (37.0)	9.8 (49.6)	16.5 (61.7)	21.2 (70.2)	23.8 (74.8)	23.3 (73.9)	17.3 (63.1)	10.6 (51.1)	3.7 (38.7)	−0.9 (30.4)	10.3 (50.5)
Mean daily minimum °C (°F)	−4.6 (23.7)	−4.5 (23.9)	0.1 (32.2)	6.3 (43.3)	12.4 (54.3)	16.7 (62.1)	18.9 (66.0)	18.3 (64.9)	13.1 (55.6)	7.2 (45.0)	1.2 (34.2)	−3 (27)	6.8 (44.2)
Record low °C (°F)	−27.2 (−17.0)	−25 (−13)	−20 (−4)	−7.3 (18.9)	0.0 (32.0)	5.6 (42.1)	8.9 (48.0)	5.0 (41.0)	−1.1 (30.0)	−8 (18)	−17 (1)	−24.5 (−12.1)	−27.2 (−17.0)
Average precipitation mm (inches)	47.9 (1.89)	42.4 (1.67)	39.3 (1.55)	38.7 (1.52)	38.4 (1.51)	56.4 (2.22)	46.3 (1.82)	37.0 (1.46)	44.3 (1.74)	33.7 (1.33)	49.3 (1.94)	52.2 (2.06)	525.9 (20.70)
Average precipitation days (≥ 1.0 mm)	8.3	7.1	7.7	6.4	5.9	7.1	4.8	3.6	5.3	5.2	7.3	8.3	77.0
Average relative humidity (%)	87.8	85.6	83.0	76.4	71.6	70.9	66.7	64.9	70.0	78.2	87.1	88.3	77.5
Source 1: Pogoda.ru.net (temperatures and record high and low)
Source 2: World Meteorological Organization (precipitation and humidity 1981–2010)

=== Ecology ===
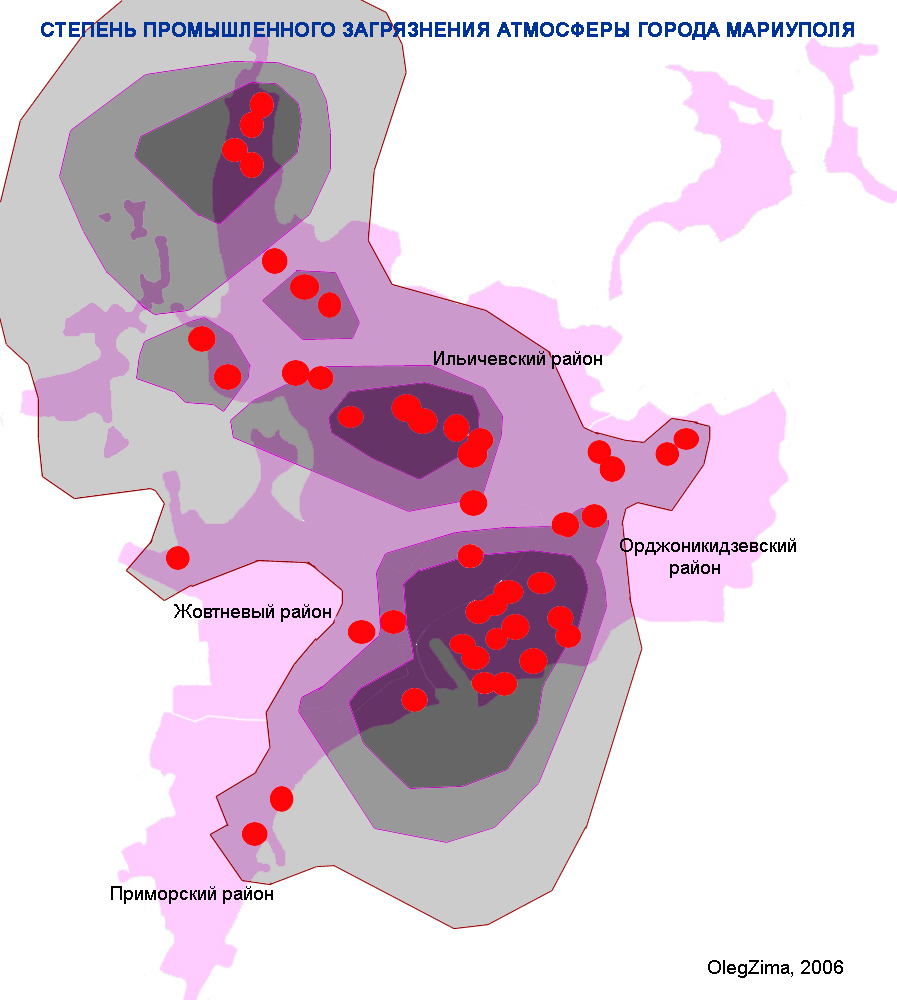
Air pollution levels in Mariupol

Mariupol has historically led Ukraine in the volume of emissions of harmful substances by industrial enterprises. The city's leading enterprises have begun to address these ecological problems, so, over the last 15 years, industrial emissions have fallen to nearly a half of their previous levels.

Due to stable production by the majority of the large industrial enterprises, the city constantly experiences environmental problems. At the end of the 1970s, Zhdanov (Mariupol) ranked third in the USSR (after Novokuznetsk and Magnitogorsk) in the quantity of industrial emissions. In 1989, including all enterprises, the city had 5,215 sources of atmospheric pollution producing 752,900 tons of harmful substances a year (about 98% from metallurgical enterprises and Mariupol Coke-Chemical Plant "Markokhim"). Even after Ukraine regained independence in 1991, by the mid-1990s many pollution limits were still exceeded:

- 1.3 times for ammonia
- 1.3 times for phenol
- 2.0 times for formaldehyde

In the residential areas adjoining the industrial giants, concentrations of benzopyrene reach 6–9 times the maximum concentration limits; hydrogen fluoride, ammonia, and formaldehyde reach 2–3 to 5 times the maximum concentration limits; dust and oxides of carbon, and hydrogen sulphide are 6–8 times the maximum concentration limits; and dioxides of nitrogen are 2–3 times the maximum concentration limits. The maximum concentration limit has been exceed on phenol by 17x, and on benzapiren by 13-14x.

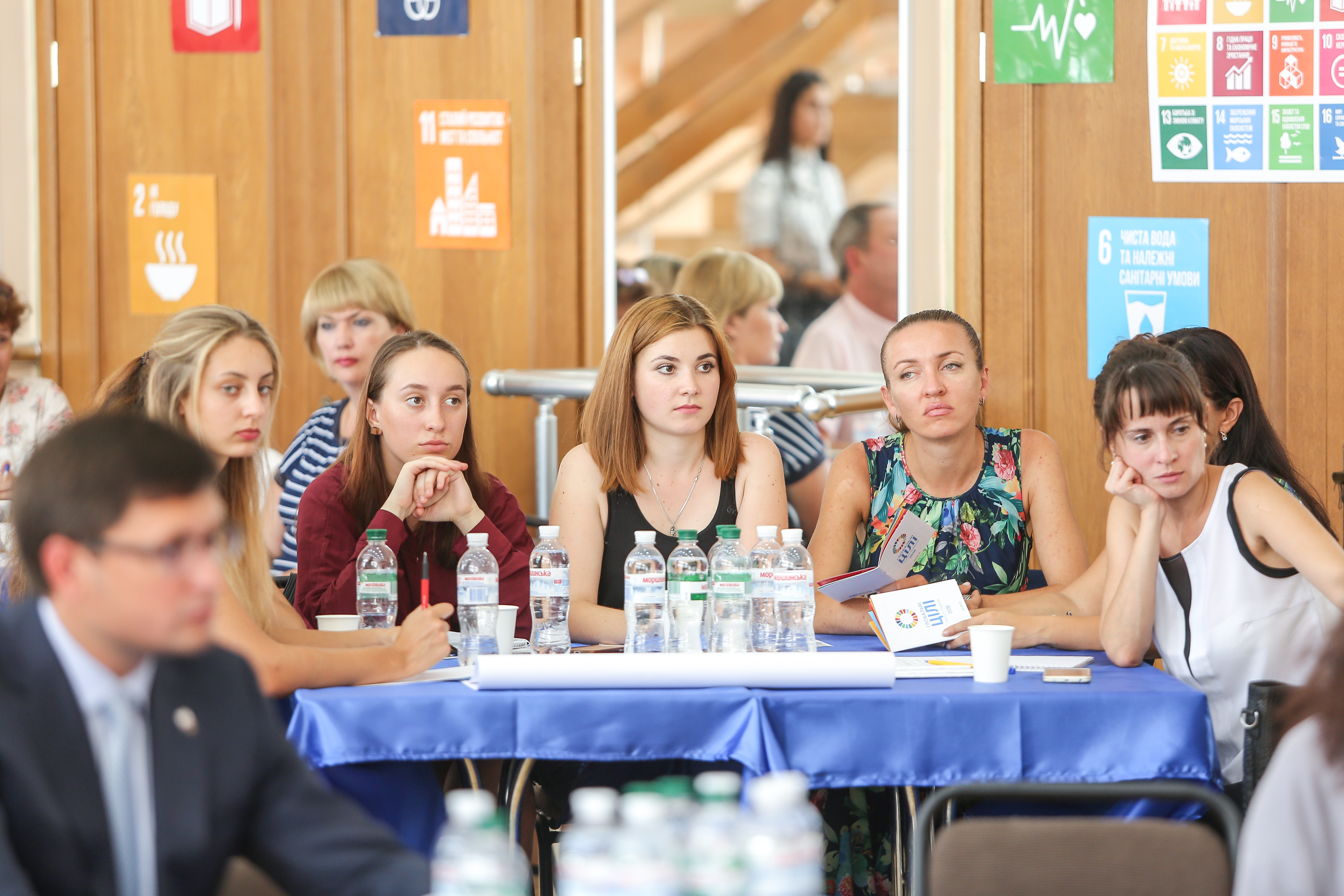
United Nations Sustainable Development Goals consultations in Mariupol, September 2016

Ill-considered locations of the Azovstal and Markokhim to economize on transport charges, during both construction in the 1930s and subsequent operations, have led to extensive wind-borne emissions into the central areas of Mariupol. Wind intensity and geographical "flatness" offer relief from the accumulation of long-standing pollutants, somewhat easing the problem.

The nearby Sea of Azov is in distress. The fish catch in the area has been reduced by orders of magnitude over the last 30–40 years.

The environmental protection activity of the leading industrial enterprises in Mariupol costs millions of hrivnas, but it appears to have little effect on the city's long-standing environmental problems.

== Government and politics ==
=== City administration and local politics ===
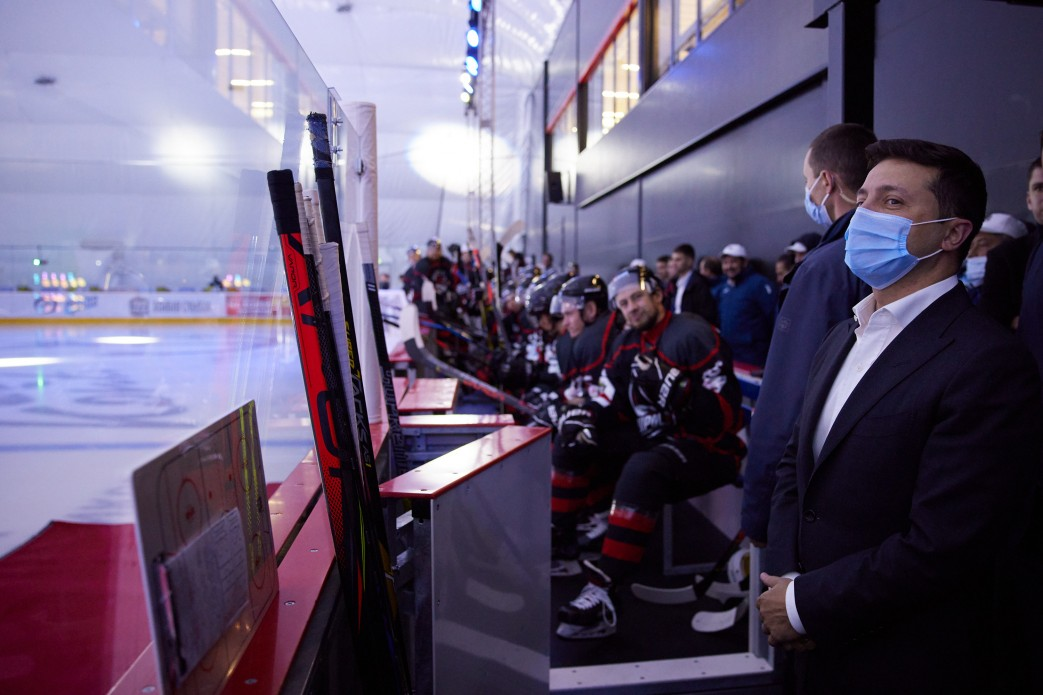
President Volodymyr Zelenskyy at the opening of Mariupol Ice Center on 22 October 2020

The Mariupol electorate traditionally supported left wing (socialist and communist) and pro-Russian political parties. At the turn of the 21st century the Party of Regions numerically prevailed in the Mariupol City Council, followed by the Socialist Party of Ukraine. Besides the city council, the local population in Mariupol also voted for deputies in the Donetsk Oblast Council on a regional level and the Verkhovna Rada on a national level.

In the presidential elections of 2004, 91.1% of the city voted for Viktor Yanukovych and 5.93% for Viktor Yuschenko. In the 2006 parliamentary elections, the city voted for the Party of Regions with 39.72% of the votes, the Socialist Party of Ukraine with 20.38%, the Natalia Vitrenko Block with 9.53%, and the Communist Party of Ukraine with 3.29%.

In the 2014 parliamentary elections the Opposition Bloc won more than 50% of the votes. The seats of the city's two electoral districts were won by Serhiy Matviyenkov and Serhiy Taruta.

In the October 2020 local elections Vadym Boychenko was re-elected mayor (chairman of executive committee of the city council) of the city with 64.57% of the votes as a candidate of the Vadym Boychenko Bloc. In these mayoral elections Volodymyr Klymenko of Opposition Platform — For Life received 25.84% of the vote, self-nominated candidate Lydia Mugli received 4.72%, the candidate from For the Future Yulia Bashkirova received 1.68% and the nominee from Our Land Mykhailo Klyuyev received 0.99% of the votes. Voter turnout in the election was 27%.

In the concurrent election in the council, the Opposition Bloc received a landslide victory. Out of a total of 54 deputies, 45 of them were part of the Opposition Bloc party, 5 were from Power of the People party, and 4 from Our Land party.

On 6 April 2022, amidst the siege of the city, politician Konstantin Ivashchenko, who had been elected Deputy leader of Mariupol City Council two years earlier, was installed by Russia as the mayor of Mariupol. He served as the de facto mayor until January 2023, when he was replaced with Oleg Morgun.

For the 2026 Russian legislative election, Mariupol was placed within Donetsk constituency, one of the 225 single member constituencies,.

=== Administrative division ===
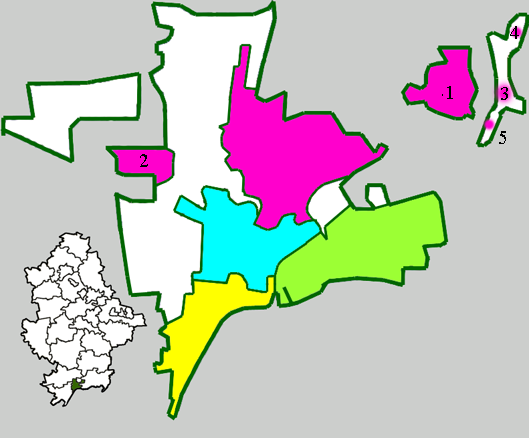
Division of the territory, subordinated to Mariupol municipality: Urban districts of Mariupol: Tsentralnyi District Kalmiuskyi District Livoberezhnyi District Prymorskyi District Populated places: 1 — Sartana 2 — Staryi Krym 3 — Talakivka 4 — Hnutove 5 — Lomakyne

Mariupol is divided into four urban districts.

- Kalmiuskyi District (until June 2016 named Illichivsk District after Vladimir Ilyich Lenin) is the northern part of the city, the largest and most industrialized neighborhood in the city. It is commonly known as the Zavod ("Factory") of Ilyich.
- Livoberezhnyi District (until June 2016 named after Sergo Ordzhonikidze) is the eastern part of the city, on the left bank of the Kalmius River. Its name means the "Left Bank".
- Prymorskyi District is the southern area of the city, on the coast of the Azov Sea. The everyday name of the central part this neighbourhood is simply "the Port".
- Tsentralnyi District is the central urban district. Its everyday name is simply "the Centre" or "the City". Formerly it was known as Zhovtnevyi District (October District) commemorating the 1917 Bolshevik revolution.

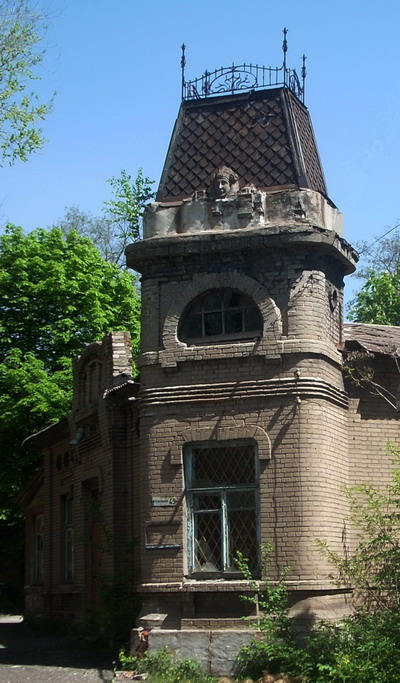
Nilsen mansion, built c. 1900

The Kalmius River separates the Livoberezhnyi District from the remaining three districts. The population is mostly concentrated in the Tsentralnyi and Prymorskyi Districts. The Kalmiuskyi District houses the large Illich Steel and Iron Works and the Azovmash manufacturing plant. The Livoberezhnyi (Left Bank) is home to the Azovstal metallurgic combine and the Koksokhim (Coke and Chemical) factory. The settlements of Staryi Krym and Sartana are located in close proximity to the city limits of Mariupol (see map).

=== Coat of arms ===
The modern coat of arms of Mariupol was confirmed in 1989. It is described in heraldic terms as: Per fess wavy argent and azure, on an anchor or, accompanied by the figure 1778 of the last. The gold anchor has a ring on top. The number 1778 indicates the year of the city's founding. The argent represents steel; the azure, the sea; the anchor, the port; and the ring, metallurgy.

=== City holidays ===
Holidays exclusive to Mariupol include:

- Day of liberation of the city from fascist aggressors (on 10 September)
- Day of the city (the Sunday after the day of liberation of Mariupol in September)
- Day of the metallurgist – a professional holiday for many citizens
- Day of the machine engineer
- Day of the seaman and other professional holidays

== Demographics ==
Historical population
Year	Pop.	±%
1897	31,116	—
1923	28,707	−7.7%
1926	40,825	+42.2%
1939	223,796	+448.2%
1959	283,570	+26.7%
1970	416,927	+47.0%
1979	502,581	+20.5%
1989	518,933	+3.3%
2001	492,176	−5.2%
2003	487,522	−0.9%
2004	484,454	−0.6%
2005	482,440	−0.4%
2006	479,959	−0.5%
2007	477,585	−0.5%
2008	474,715	−0.6%
2009	471,975	−0.6%
2010	469,336	−0.6%
2011	466,665	−0.6%
2012	464,457	−0.5%
2013	461,810	−0.6%
2014	458,533	−0.7%
2015	455,063	−0.8%
2016	453,643	−0.3%
2017	449,498	−0.9%
2018	444,493	−1.1%
2019	440,367	−0.9%
2020	436,569	−0.9%
2021	431,859	−1.1%
2022	425,681	−1.4%
2023	280,000	−34.2%

As of 1 December 2014, the city's population was 477,992. Over the previous century the population had grown nearly twelvefold. The city is populated by Ukrainians, Russians, Pontic Greeks (including Caucasus Greeks and Tatar- and Turkish-speaking but Greek Orthodox Christian Urums), Belarusians, Armenians, Jews, etc. The main language is Russian.

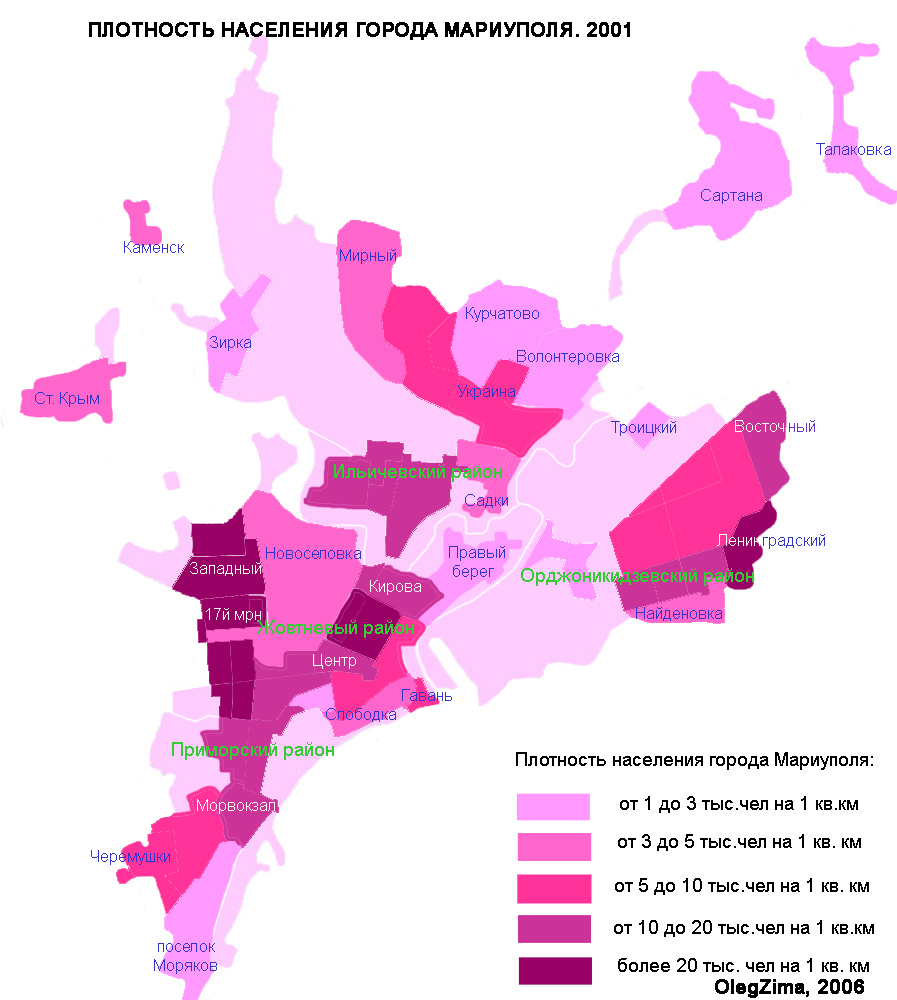
Mariupol population density

The population fell precipitously as the result of the siege of the city in 2022. Per Ukrainian sources it was 120 thousand in 2023, while according to Russian administration the city population was approximately 280 thousand.

=== Ethnic structure ===
The city is largely and traditionally Russian-speaking, while ethnically the population is divided about evenly between Ukrainians and Russians. There is also a significant ethnic Greek minority in the city.

In 2002, ethnic Ukrainians made up the largest percentage (48.7%) but less than half of the population; the second greatest ethnicity was Russian (44.4%). A June–July 2017 survey indicated that Ukrainians had grown to 59% of Mariupol's population and the Russian share had dropped to 33%.

The city is home to the largest population of Pontic Greeks in Ukraine ("Greeks of Priazovye") at 21,900, with 31,400 more in the six nearby rural areas, totaling about 70% of the Pontic Greek population of the area and 60% for the country.

Ethnic structure in 2002
Ethnicity	Number of people	Percent of population
Ukrainian	248,683	48.7
Russian	226,848	44.4
Greeks	21,923	4.3
Belarusian	3,858	0.8
Armenian	1,205	0.2
Jews	1,176	0.2
Bulgarian	1,082	0.2
other	6,060	1.2
All population	510,835	100

=== Language structure ===
The city is predominantly Russian speaking. From 60% to 80% of Ukrainian-language inhabitants communicate in Surzhyk, due to the large influence of Russian culture.

Most Greek-speaking villages in the region speak a dialect called Rumeíka, a branch of Pontic Greek. About 17 villages speak this language today. Modern scholars distinguish five subdialects of Rumeíka according to their similarity to standard Modern Greek. This was derived from the dialect of the original Pontic settlers from the Crimea. Although Rumeíka is often described as a Pontic dialect, the situation is more nuanced. Arguments can be brought both for Rumeíka's similarity to Pontic Greek and to the Northern Greek dialects. In the view of Maxim Kisilier, while the Rumeíka dialect shares some features with both the Pontic Greek and the Northern Greek dialects, it is better considered on its own terms as a separate Greek dialect, or even a group of dialects.

The village of Anadol speaks Pontic proper, being settled from the Pontos in the 19th century. After the October Revolution of 1917, a Rumaiic revival occurred in the region. The Soviet administration established a Greek-Rumaiic theater, several magazines and a newspaper, and a number of Rumaiic language schools. The best Rumaiic poet Georgi Kostoprav created a Rumaiic poetic language for his work. This process was reversed in 1937 as Kostoprav and many other Rumaiics and Urums were killed as part of Joseph Stalin's national policies.

A new attempt to preserve a sense of ethnic Rumaiic identity started in the mid-1980s. The Ukrainian scholar Andriy Biletsky created a new Slavonic alphabet for Greek speakers. Though a number of writers and poets make use of this alphabet, the population of the region rarely uses it. The Rumaiic language is declining rapidly, most endangered by the standard Modern Greek which is taught in schools and the local university. The latest investigations by Alexandra Gromova demonstrate that there is still hope that elements of the Rumaiic population will continue to use the dialect.

Along with those speaking Rumeíka, there were and are a number of Tatar-speaking Orthodox villages, the so-called Urums, which is the Tatar term for Romaios or Rumei. This subdivision had already occurred in Crimea before the settlement of the Azov Sea steppe region by Pontic Greeks which began following the fall of the Empire of Trebizond in northeastern Anatolia in 1461. It occurred on a larger scale after the end of the Russo-Turkish War in 1779, as part of the Russian policy to populate and develop the region while depriving the Crimea of an economically active part of its population. Though Greek- and Tatar-speaking settlers lived separately, the language of the Urums was the lingua franca of the region for a long time, being called the language of the bazaar.

There are also a number of settlements of other ethnic communities, including Germans, Bulgarians, and Albanians (though the meanings of all such terms in this context is open to dispute).

Native languages of the population as of the All-Russian Empire Census in 1897:

Language	The city of Mariupol
Russian	19,670
Ukrainian	3,125
Greek	1,590
Turkish	922
Total Population	31,116

Language structure in 2001
Language	Number (person)	Percentage (%)
Russian	457,931	89.64
Ukrainian	50,656	9.92
Greek (Note: Including Mariupol Greek and Urum)	1,046	0.20
Armenian	372	0.07
Belarusian	266	0.05
Bulgarian	55	0.01
other	509	0.10
All population	510,835	100

=== Religious communities ===
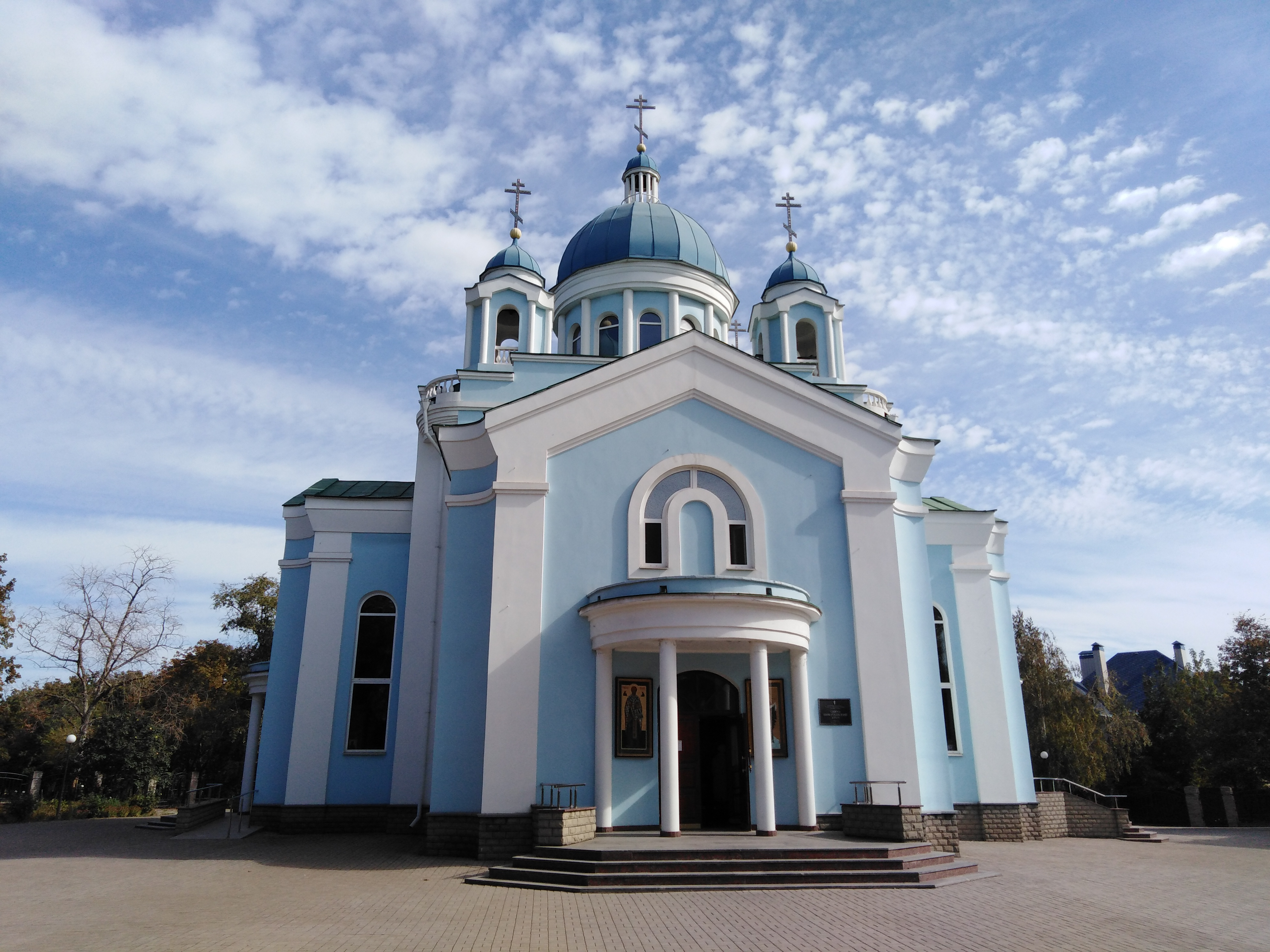
St. Nicholas Church in 2020

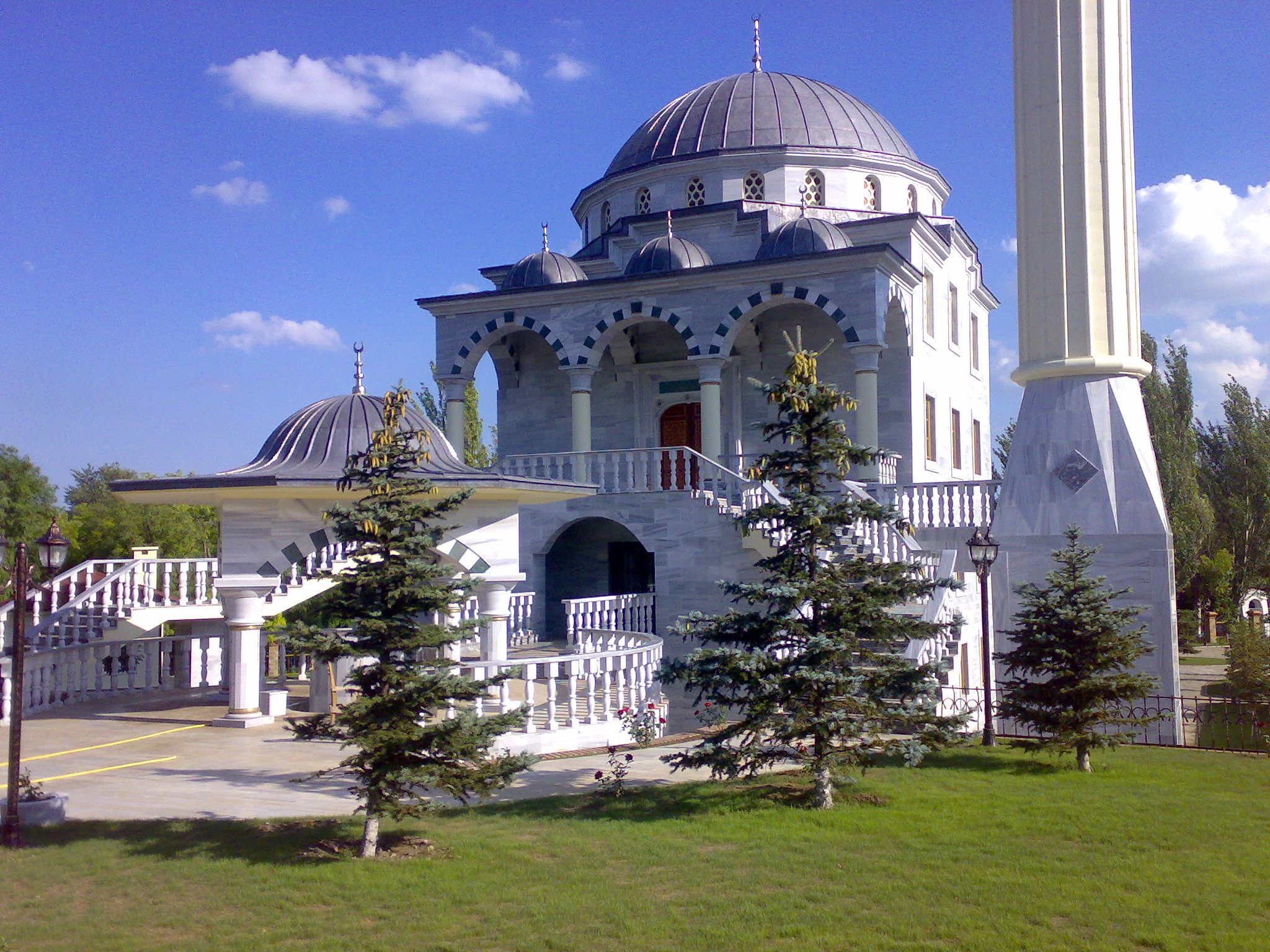
Sultan Suleiman Mosque in 2009

- 11 churches of the Ukrainian Orthodox Church of the Moscow Patriarchy.
- 3 churches of the Ukrainian Orthodox Church of the Kyiv Patriarchy.
- 52 various religious communities.

The city is adorned by the St. Nicholas Cathedral (in the Tsentralnyi District) and other churches of the city, namely:

- St. Nicholas (Prymorskyi District)
- St. Michael (Livoberezhnyi District)
- Holy Transfiguration (Primorskyi District)
- St. Elijah (Kalmiuskyi District)
- Dormition (Livoberezhnyi District)
- St. Volodymyr (Livoberezhnyi District)
- St. Ambrose of Optina (Kalmiuskyi District)
- St. Varlampy (Kalmiuskyi District)
- Sts. Boris and Gleb (Prymorskyi District)

Many churches were destroyed in the 1930s during the Soviet era by the Bolshevik government as part of the Atheist Five-Year Plan:

- Church of the Assumption of Mary
- Church of Mary Magdalene
- Tsarevich Chapel in Mariupol
- Roman Catholic Church of the Assumption of Mary also known as "the church of the Italians" was built in 1860. The Italians in Mariupol exported grain and imported citrus fruits and spices. In Soviet times the church was destroyed in 1936.
- Saints Constantine and Helen Church
- Cathedral of St. Charalambos
- Cathedral of the Holy Virgin Protection
- Church of the Nativity of the Virgin

New buildings:

- Cathedral of Saint Nicholas
- Cathedral of Saint Michael the Archangel
- Cathedral of Saint George, built in 2005
- Cathedral of the Holy Virgin Protection
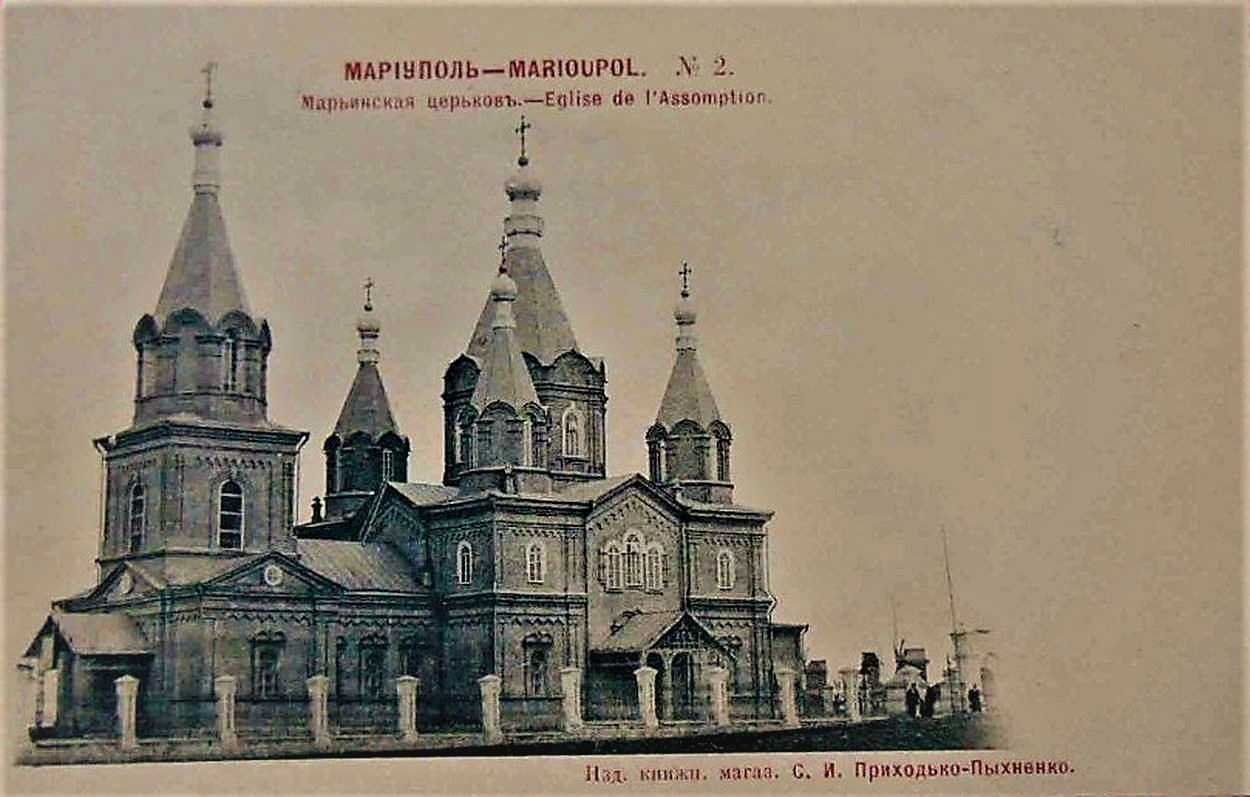
Church of the Assumption of Mary

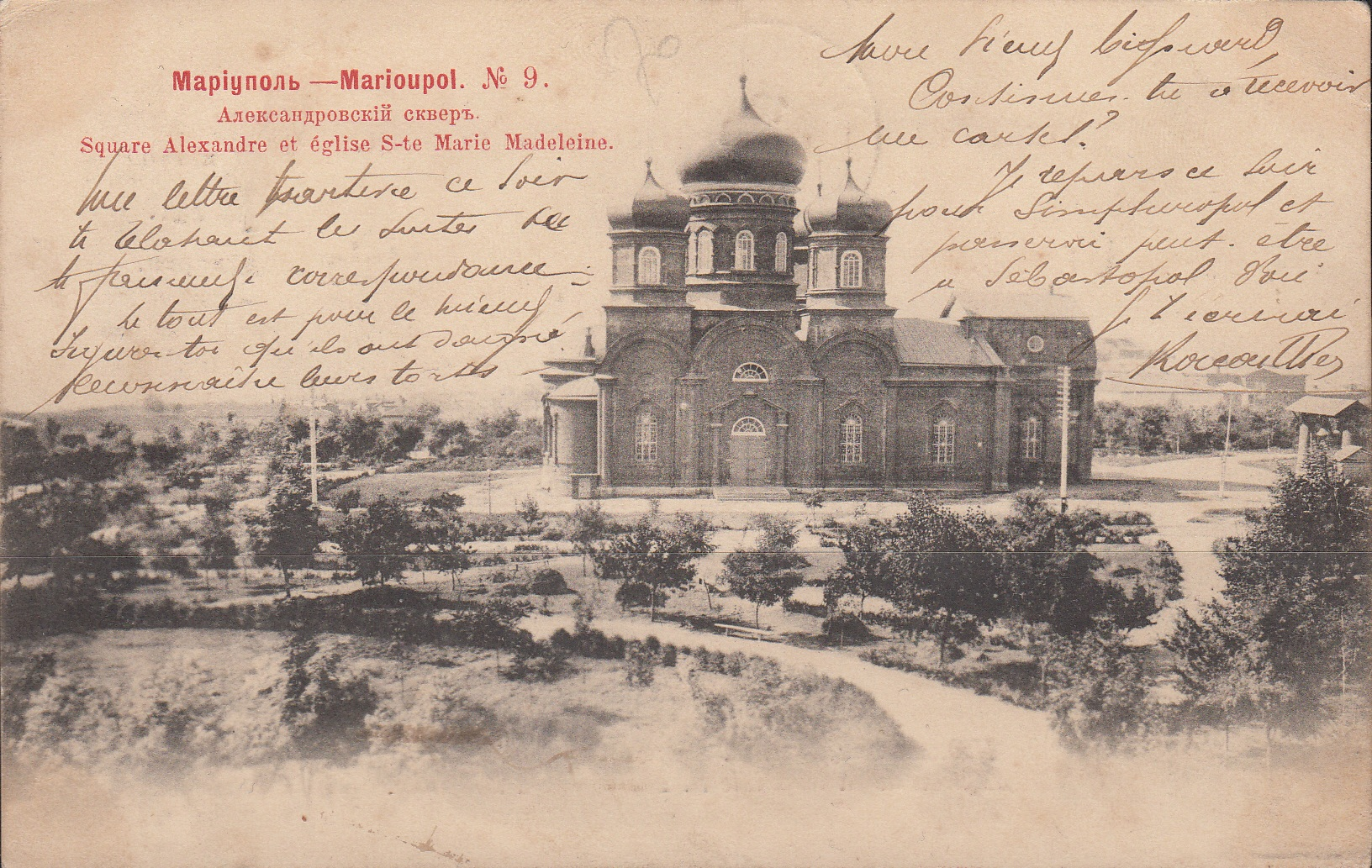
Church of Mary Magdalene

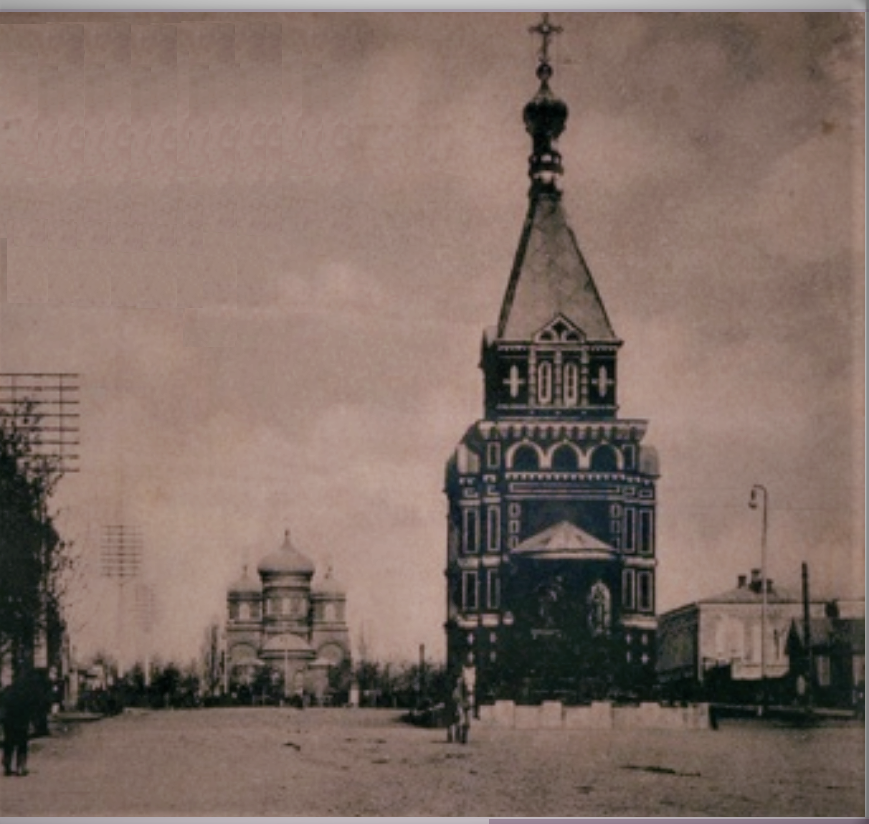
Tsarevich Chapel in Mariupol

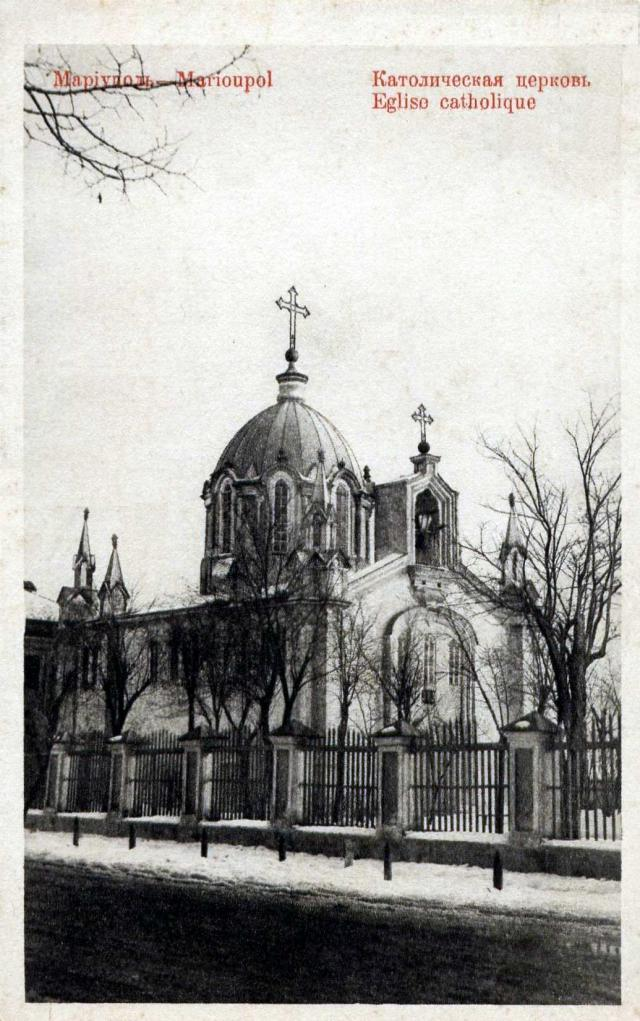
Roman Catholic church

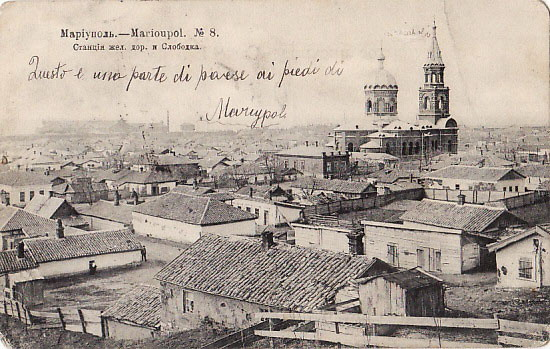
Saints Constantine and Helen Church

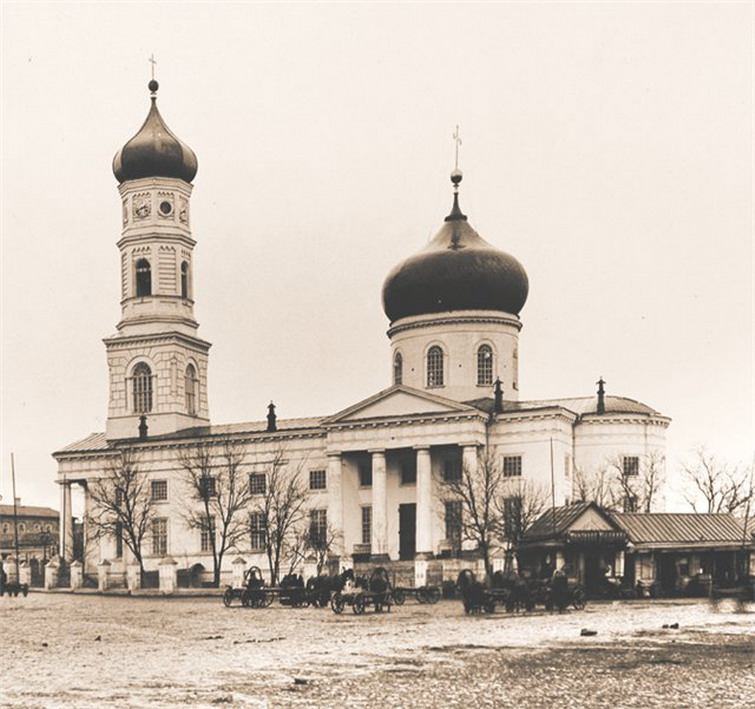
Cathedral of St. Charalambos

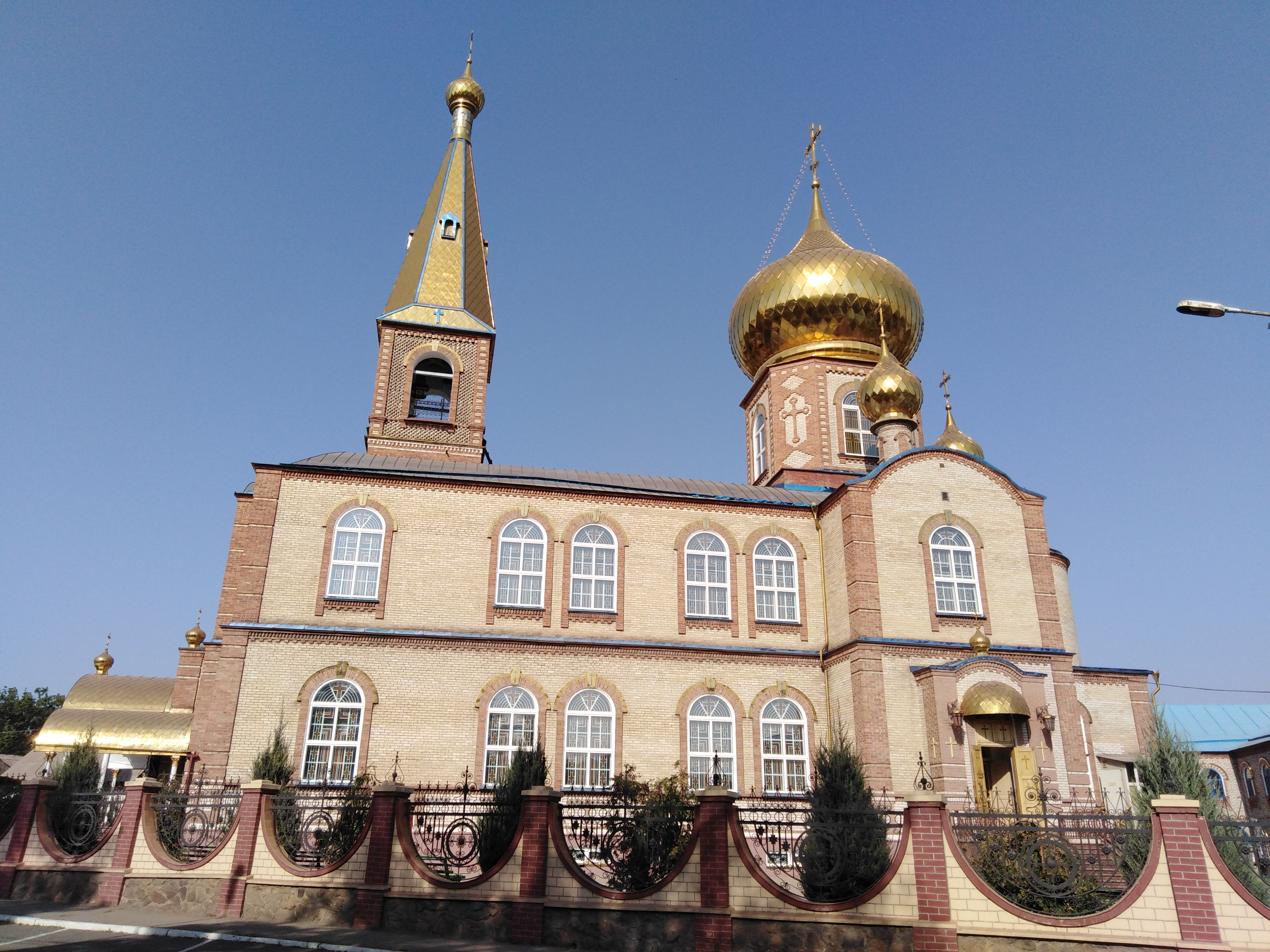
Cathedral of Saint Nicholas

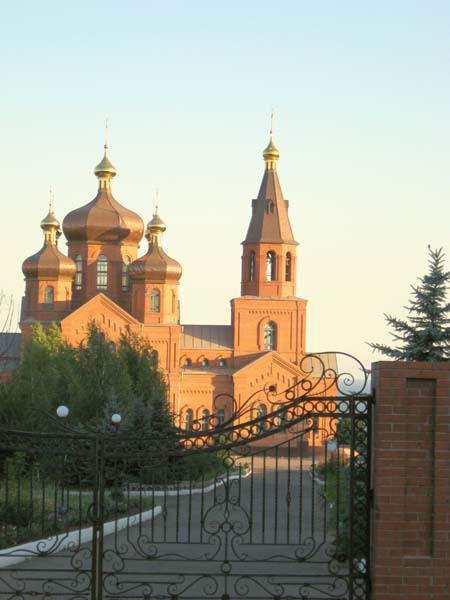
Cathedral of Saint Michael the Archangel

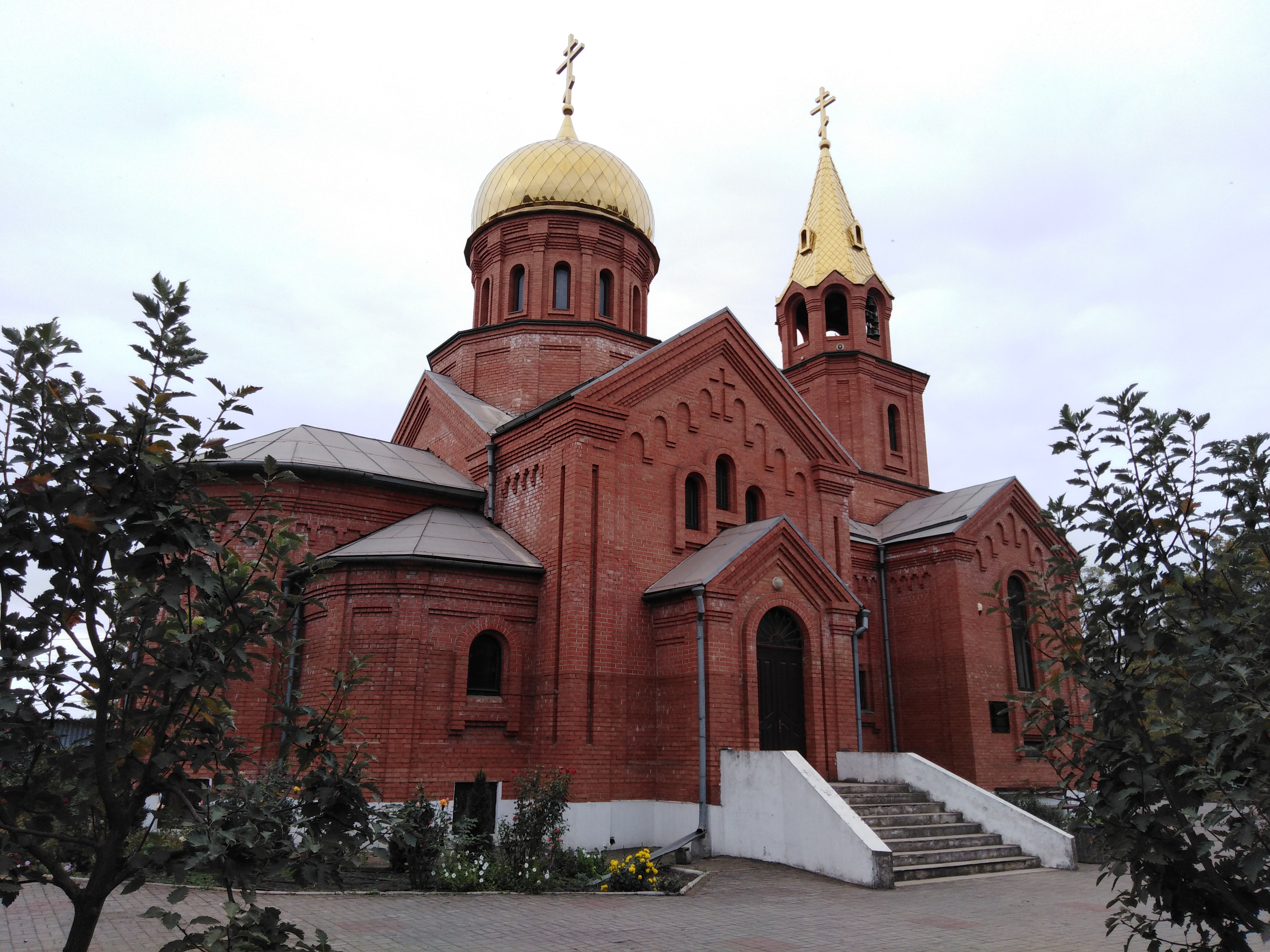
Cathedral of Saint George

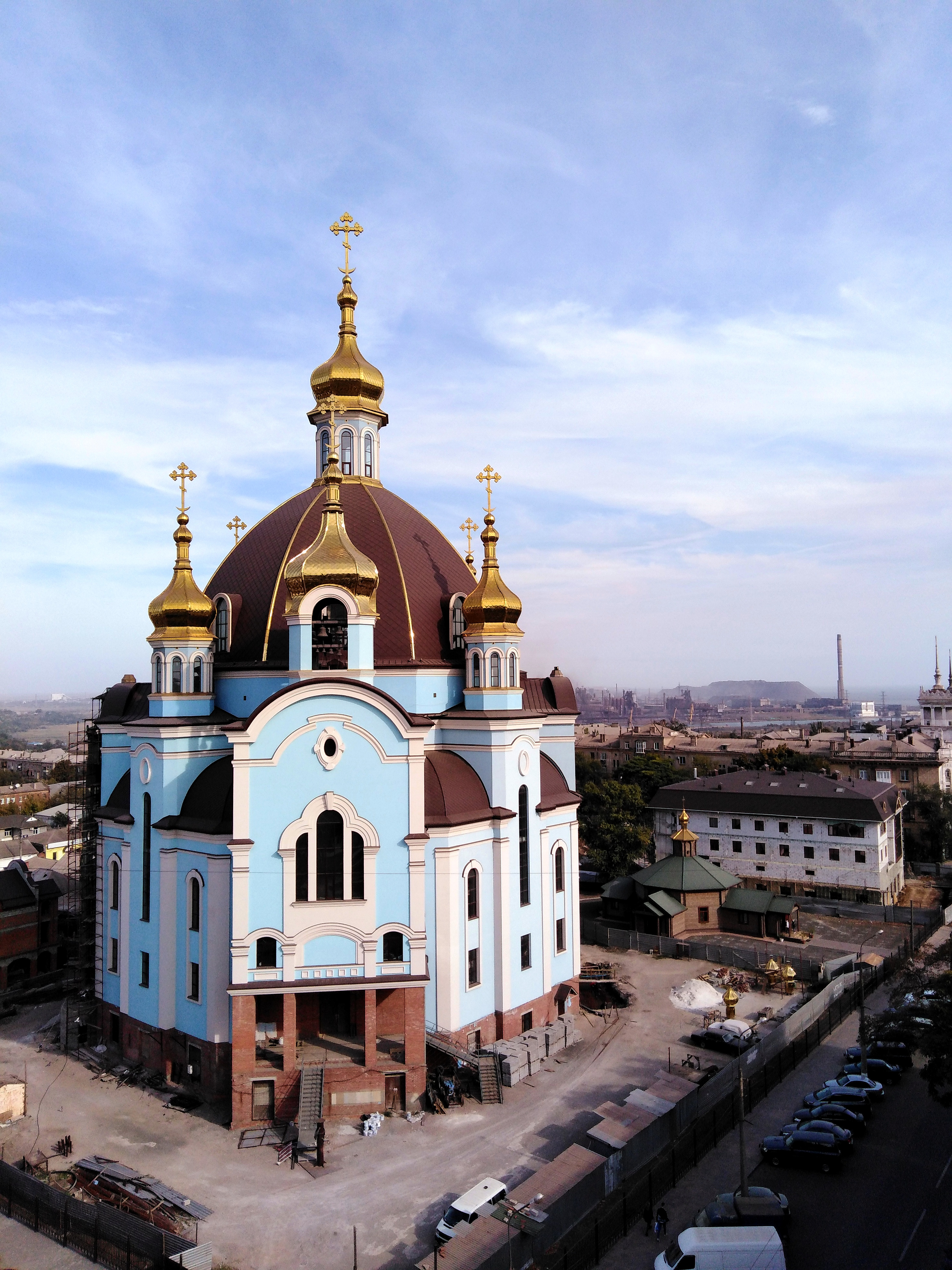
Cathedral of the Holy Virgin Protection

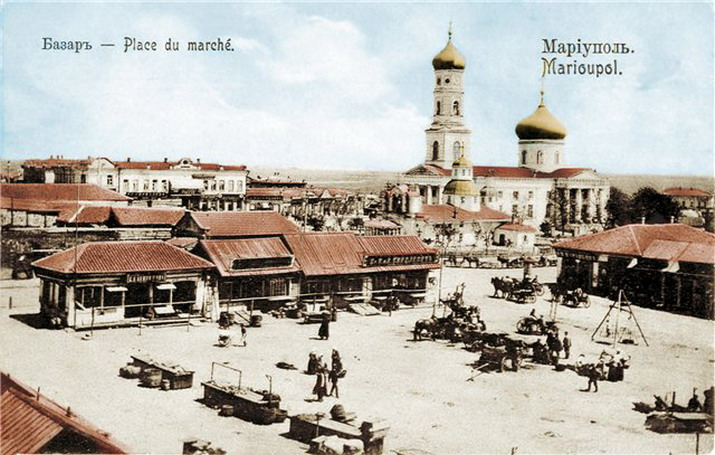
Market square

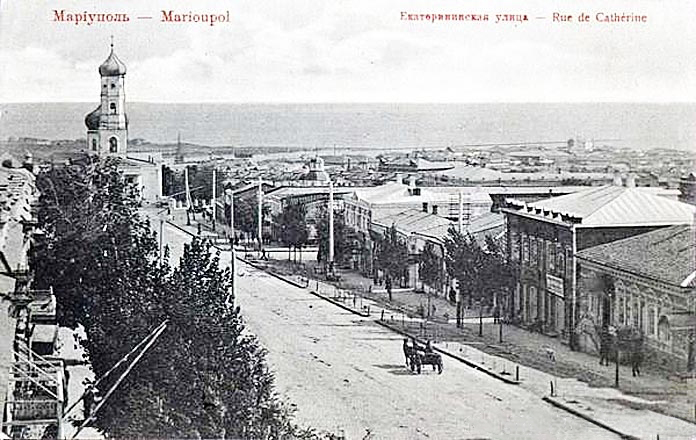
Catherine Street

In addition to churches, there are 3 mosques around the city.

== Economy ==
=== Employment ===
In 2009, the official rate of unemployment in the city was 2%. The figure, however, only included people registered as "unemployed" in the local job centre. The real unemployment rate was therefore higher.

Historic unemployment rate in Mariupol (year end)
Year	Unemployment (% of labor force)
2006	0.4
2007	0.4
2008	1.2
2009	2.0

=== Industry ===
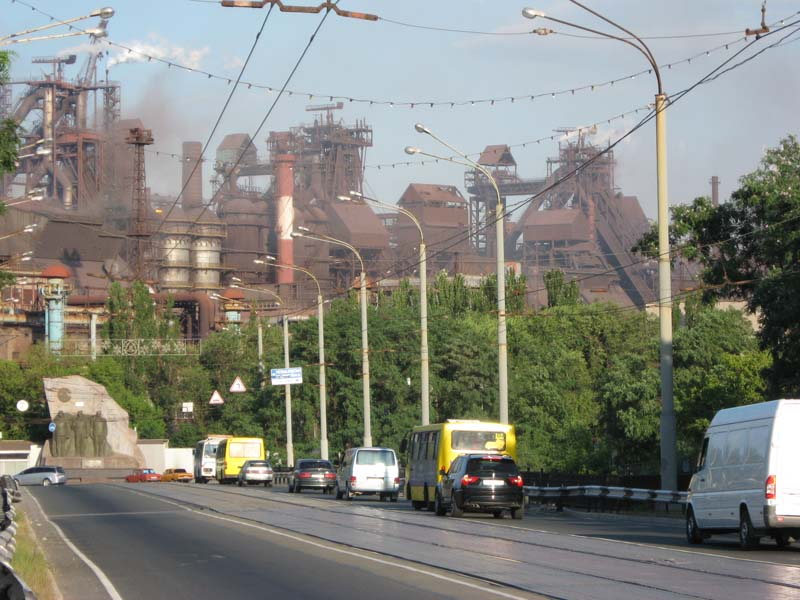
Azovstal iron and steel works

There were 56 industrial enterprises in Mariupol under various plans of ownership. The city's industry was diverse, with heavy industry dominant. Mariupol was home to major steel mills (including some of global importance) and chemical plants; there was also an important seaport and a railroad junction. The largest enterprises were Ilyich Iron and Steel Works, Azovstal, Azovmash Holding, and the Mariupol Sea Trading Port. There were also shipyards, fish canneries, and various educational institutions with studies in metallurgy and science.

The total industrial production of the city for eight months in 2005 (January – August) was 21378.2 million hryvnas (US$4.233 billion), compared to 1999 – 6169.806 million hryvnas (US$1.222 billion). This was 37.5% of the total production for Donetsk Oblast. The leading business of the city was ferrous metallurgy, which made up 93.5% of the city's income from industrial production. The annual output estimates are in millions of tonnes of iron, steel, rolled iron, and agglomerate.

- Illich Steel and Iron Works (Mariupol Metallurgical Combine named Ilyich) was an integrated mill, with all the facilities for a full metallurgical cycle. Housing around 100 thousand workers, it was the second largest in Ukraine, after Kryvorizhstal. The company was the collective property of the Society of Tenants (Joint-Stock Company "Ilyich-steel"; with about 37,000 worker-shareholders). The head of the board of enterprise was the People's Deputy, Volodymyr Boyko. The enterprise had multiple structural divisions: Management of Public Catering and Trade ("УОПТ", a network of 52 enterprises), a chemist's network Ilyich-Pharm, more than 50 agro shops (former collective farms of the south of Donetsk and Zaporizhzhia Oblasts), the office of the Komsomol Mines, various machine-building enterprises in the Cherkasy Oblast, Mariupol International Airport, and the Mariupol Television Network (locally known as MTV).
- Azovstal was another integrated mill ("Combine"), the third largest in Ukraine in terms of gross revenue. Its production varied in millions of tonnes of pig-iron, steel, and rolled iron annually. The company's general director was Oleksiy Bilyi. Azovstal was closely connected with the Mariupol coke works, "Markokhim", which served as its supplier of coke.
- Open Society Azovmash (Holding) was the largest machine-building enterprise in Ukraine, specialising in production of equipment for mining-metallurgical complexes, tank cars, port cranes, boilers, fuel-fillers, etc. The President was Oleksandr Savchuk. The enterprise was formerly owned by the state and was privatised by System Capital Management, a Donetsk financial and economic group.
- Azov ship-repair factory (АСРЗ) was the largest enterprise of its class on the Sea of Azov, also owned by System Capital Management.
- Open Society Mariupol sea trading port was the largest sea port in eastern Ukraine through which was transported large quantities of various products such as coal, metal, mechanical engineering products, varieties of ores and grains from and to various cities such as Donetsk, Kharkiv, Luhansk, and the near regions of the Russian Federation.
- Azov sea shipping company which was owned until 2003 by the Donbass Merchant Marine fleet, is now also under the ownership of System Capital Management. Donbass Merchant Marine is now a bankrupt enterprise which formerly operated out of ports on the Sea of Azov such as Mariupol, Berdiansk, and Taganrog (Russia).

The above-mentioned enterprises, along with a plethora of others not mentioned, are located in the free economic zone of Azov.

=== Finances ===
The GDP of the city in 2004 was ₴22,769,400 ($4,510,400); it is listed in the state budget as ₴83,332,000 ($16,507,400). The city is one of the largest contributors to the Ukrainian national budget (after Kyiv and Zaporizhzhia).

The GPA of the city is ₴1,262.04 (~US$250.00) a month, one of the highest in the country. The average pension in the city is ₴423.15 ($83.82). Commercial debts in the city were reduced in 2005 to 1.1% or ₴5.1 million ($1.01 million).

Income from services rendered for 9 months of 2005 was ₴860.4 million ($107.4 million) and the volume of retail trade for the same period was ₴838.7 million ($166.1 million). The city's enterprises for 9 months of 2005 recorded a positive financial result (profit) of ₴3.2 billion ($634 million), which is 23.6% more than in the prior year (2004).

== Culture ==
=== Cultural institutions ===
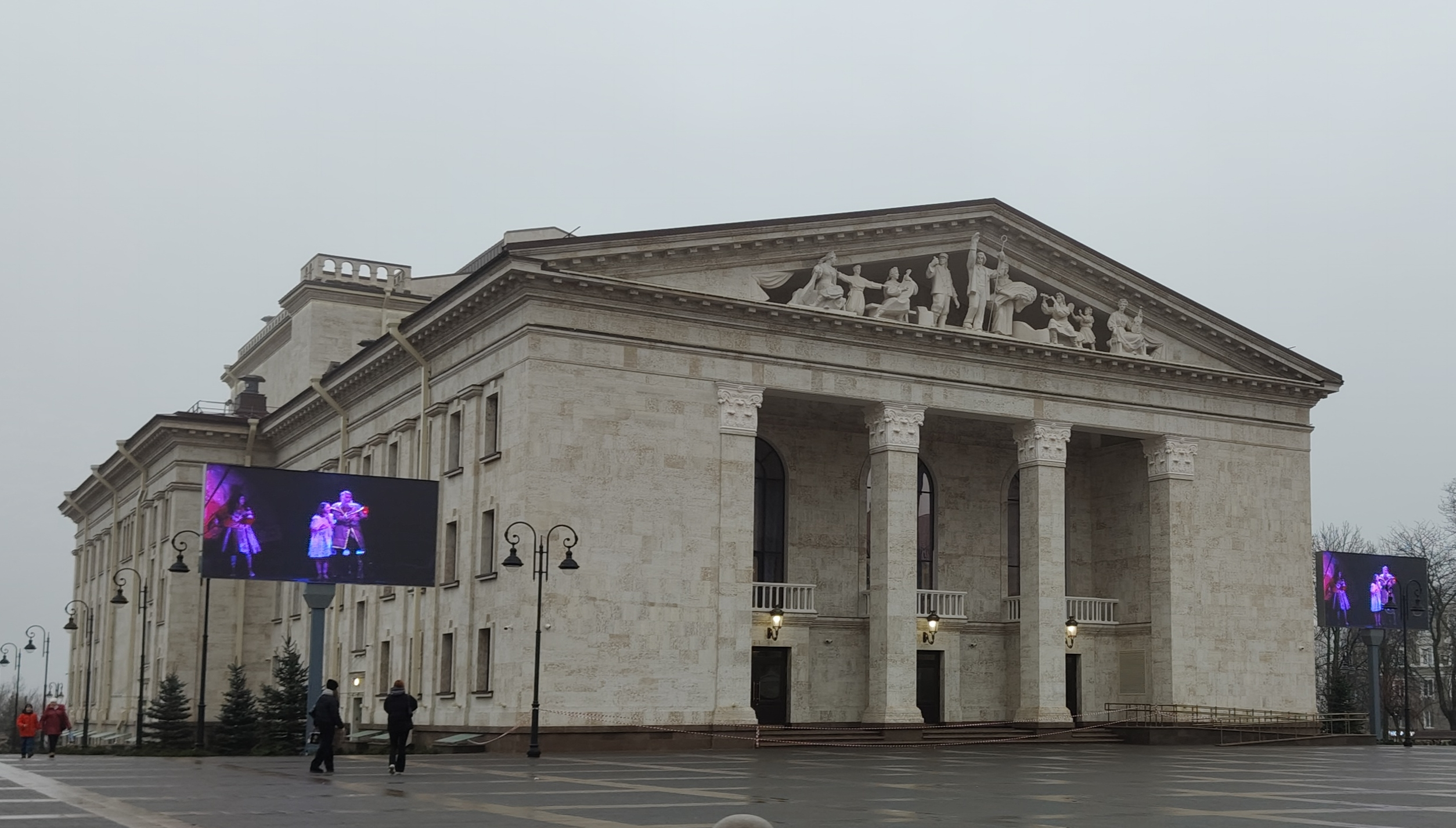
Drama Theatre in December 2025 after reconstruction under Russian occupation following the Mariupol theatre airstrike destroying the previous building

Theatres

- Donetsk Academic Regional Drama Theater. In 2003 the oldest theater in the region celebrated its 125th anniversary. For its contribution to the spiritual education of theater, in 2000 it was awarded the laureate in the "Gold Scythian" competition. The theatre was largely destroyed by Russian airstrikes on 16 March 2022 in an attack that has been classified as a war crime by both the Organization for Security and Co-operation in Europe and Amnesty International. While the theatre's staff continues to perform in exile, the Russian occupation authorities rebuilt and reopened the theatre on 28 December 2025 in a propaganda effort to showcase reconstruction in occupied Ukrainian territory.

Cinemas

- Pobeda ("Victory") – now closed
- Savona
- Multiplex

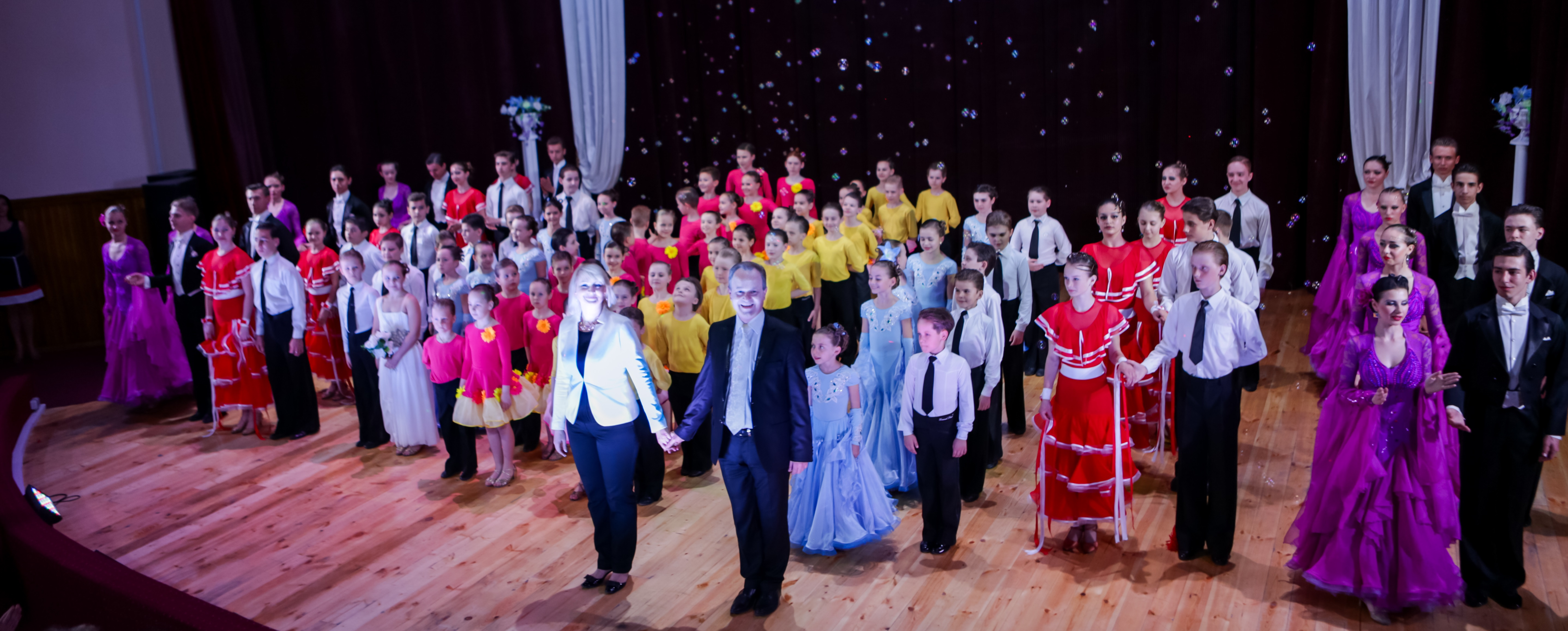
A folk dance ensemble performing in Mariupol

Palaces of culture (recreation centres) (together with clubs – 16):

- Metallurgov ("Metallurgists") of Ilyich Steel & Iron Works
- Azovstal of Azovstal Steel & Iron Works
- Iskra ("Spark") of Azovmash Machine-builder Concern
- MarKokhim (Mariupol Coke Chemistry)
- Moryakov ("Sailors")
- Stroitel ("Builders")
- Palace of children's and youth art ("Palace of Children art")
- Municipal Palace of Culture

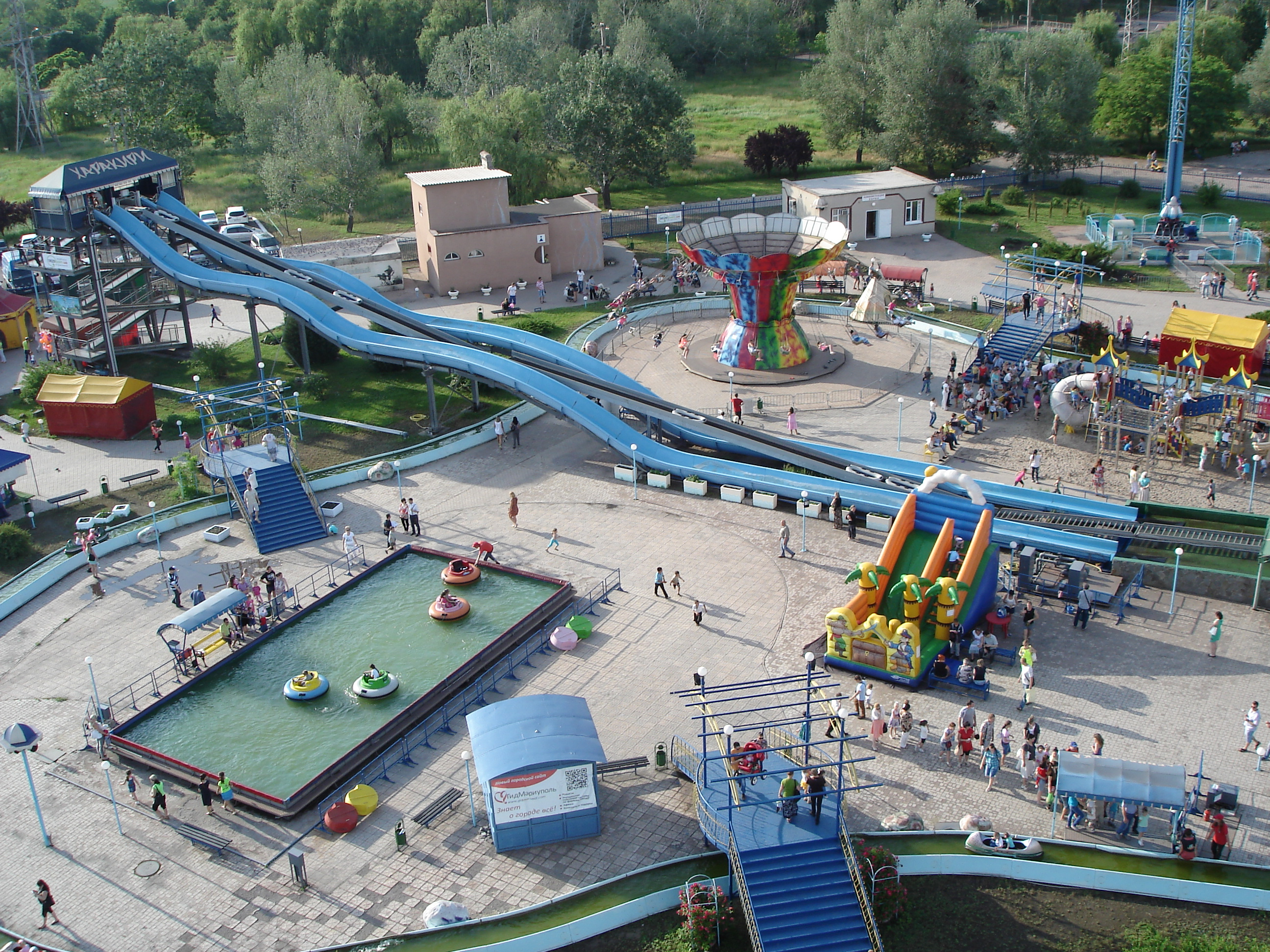
Extreme Park in Mariupol

Showrooms and museums

- Mariupol Regional Museum
- Kuindzhi Art Exhibition
- Museum of Folk Life (formerly, the museum of Andrey Zhdanov)
- Museum halls of the industrial enterprises and their divisions, establishments and the organisations of city, and others.
- Pole Bitvy (Battlefield) Museum

Libraries (35)

- Korolenko Central Library;
- Gorky Central Children's Library;
- Serafimovich Library (The oldest library in the city);
- And also: Gaydar Library, Honchar Library, Hrushevsky Library, Krupskaya Library, Kuprin Library, Lesya Ukrainka Library, Marshak Library, Morozov Library, Novikov-Priboy Library, Pushkin Library, Svetlov Library, Turgenev Library, Franko Library, Chekhov Library, Chukovsky Library, the libraries of industrial enterprises, establishments, and the organisations of the city.

=== Art and literature ===
Creative Organisations of Artists, Union of Journalists of Mariupol, the Literary Union «Azovye» (from 1924, about 100 members), and others. Works of Mariupol poets and writers: N. Berilov, A. Belous, G. Moroz, A. Shapurmi, A. Savchenko, V. Kior, N. Harakoz, L. Kiryakov, L. Belozerova, P. Bessonov, and A. Zaruba are written in the Russian, Ukrainian, and Greek languages. Presently, 10 members of the National Union of Writers of Ukraine live in the city.

=== Festivals ===
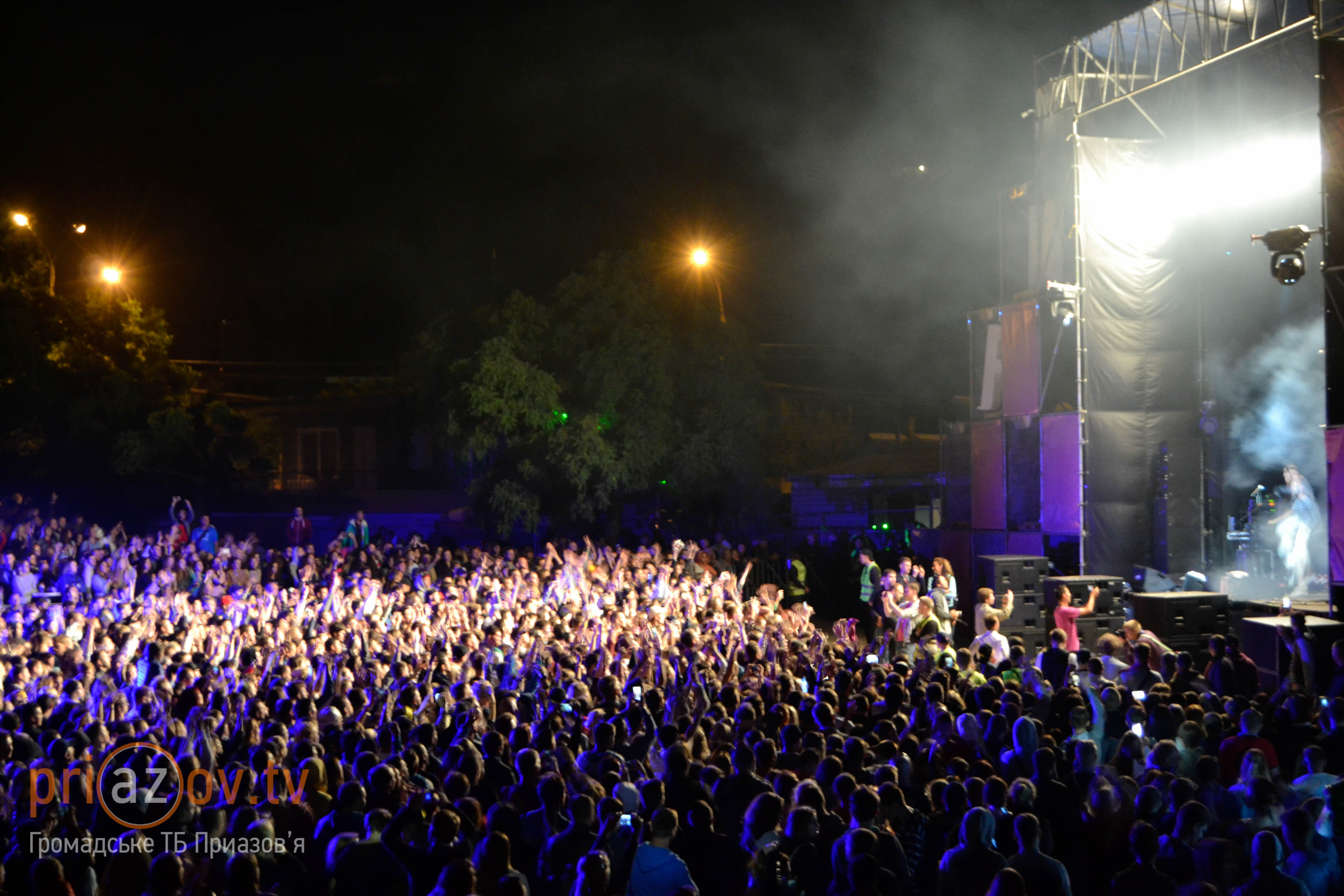
Crowd listening to Ivan Dorn at the MRPL City Festival

From 2017 Mariupol has hosted the MRPL City Festival, an annual music festival, held every August on Pishchanka beach. The festival began in 2017 as "the biggest event on the East Coast." The festival is multi-genre: each scene has its own style.

Gogolfest is an annual multidisciplinary international festival of contemporary art, which contains theatrical performances, day and night musical performances, film shows, art exhibitions and dialogues. In 2018–2019 Gogolfest was held in Mariupol. In 2019 the festival lasted from 26 April to 1 May 2019.

== Tourism and attractions ==
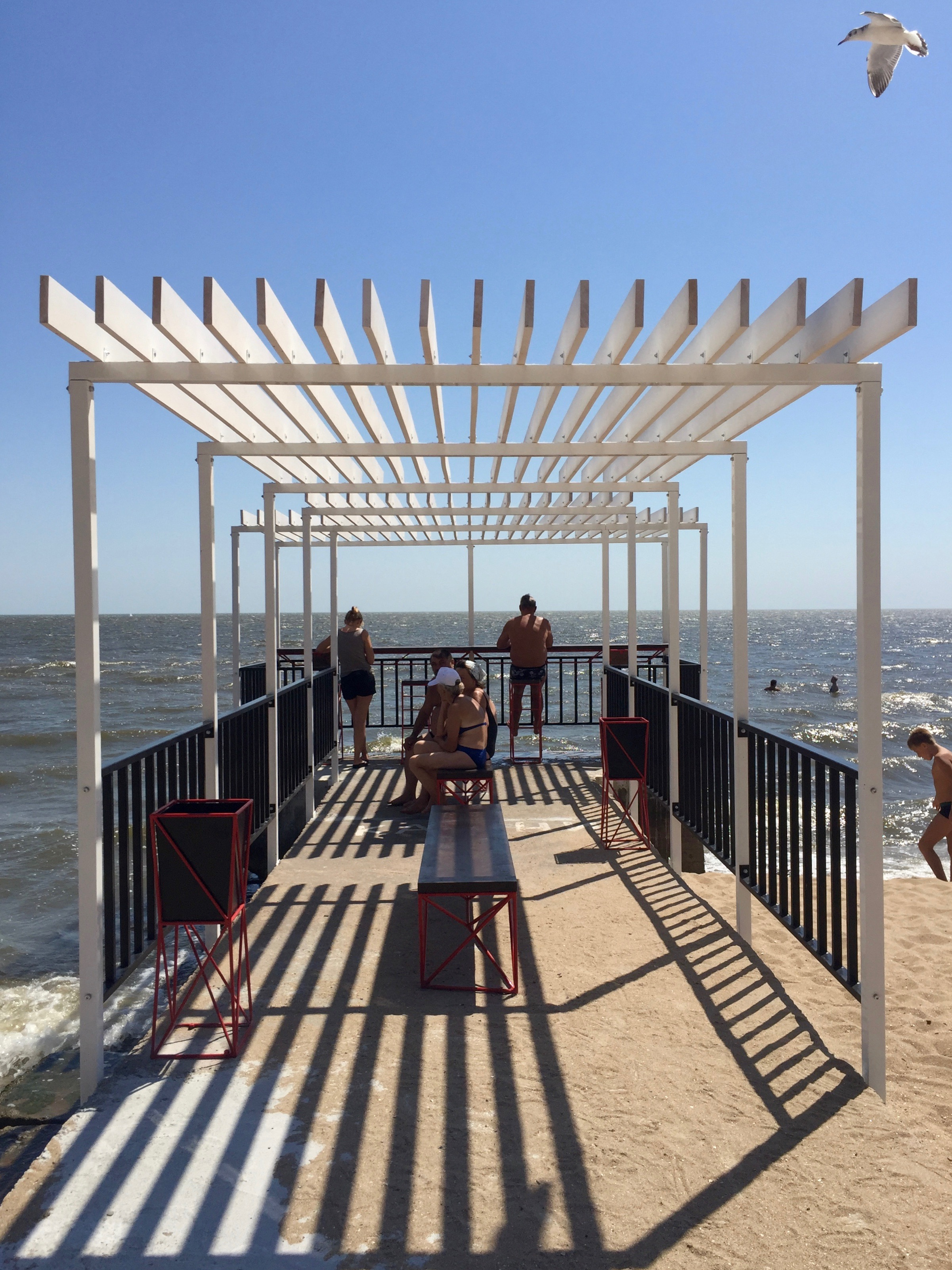
Beach pier in Mariupol

Tourist attractions are mainly on the coast of the Sea of Azov. Around the city a strip of resort settlements was established: Melekino, Urzuf, Yalta, Donetsk Oblast, Sedovo, Bezymennoye, Sopino, Belosaray Kosa,

The first resorts in the city opened in 1926. Along the sea a narrow bar of sandy beaches stretches for 16 km. Water temperature in the summer ranges from 22 to 24 °C (72–75 °F). The duration of the bathing season is 120 days.

=== Parks ===
- City Square (Theatrical Square)
- Extreme Park (new attractions near to the biggest in city of the Palace of Culture of Metallurgists)
- Gurov Meadow-park (former Meadow-park a name of the 200-anniversary of Mariupol)
- City Garden ("Children's Central Public Garden")
- Veselka Park (Livoberezhnyi District), named for the rainbow
- Azovstal Park (Livoberezhnyi District)
- Petrovsky Park (near the modern Volodymyr Boiko Stadium and constructions of "Azovmash" basketball club, Kalmiuskyi District)
- Primorsky Park (Prymorsky District)

=== Monuments ===
Mariupol has monuments to Vladimir Vysotsky, and in honour of the liberation of Donbass, the metallurgists, and others.

The city of Mariupol has several parks and squares, the most popular being the City Square (Theater Square), the Amusement Park, the Gurov Park (formerly Mariupol Bicentenary Park), the Petrovski Park, the City Gardens (with monuments to the heroes of the Second World War, inaugurated in 1863, the Vessiolka park, the Azovstal park, the Sea park (formerly of the Fiftieth Anniversary of the October Revolution).

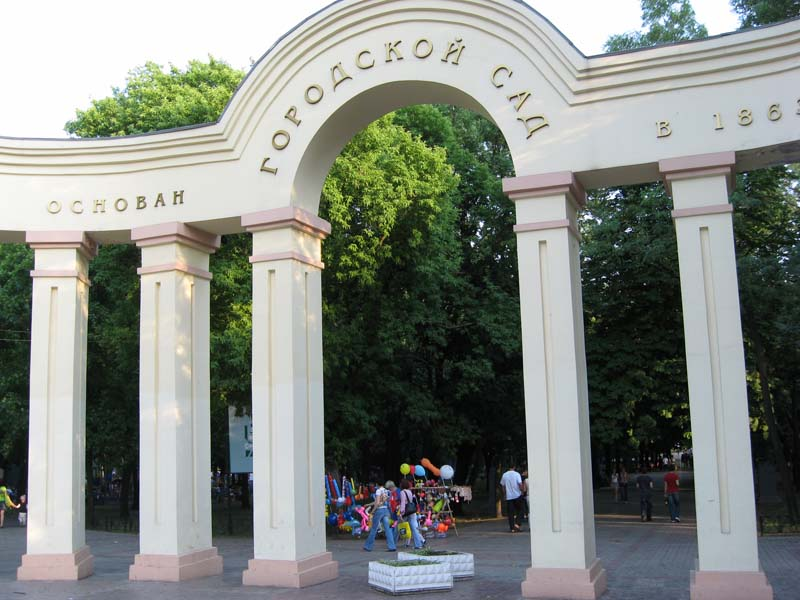
Entrance to the city gardens

Mariupol is known for its many memorials, statues and sculptures, including the bust of Mariupol-born painter Arkhip Kuindzhi, a statue of Taras Shevchenko, founder of the Ukrainian literary language in the second half of the 19th century, as well as Pushkin, representing the Russian language. Four statues of Lenin remain as testimonies to history. A statue of Andrei Zhdanov after whom the city was named from 1948 to 1990, dominated the central square of the city in the Soviet period but was removed in 1990. A statue of the iconoclastic singer Vladimir Vysotsky (former husband of the Russian-French actress Marina Vlady), was inaugurated in 1998. A bust of the winner of the White Army, commander of a battalion in the region in April 1919, Kuzma Anatov, was inaugurated in 1968 on the street of the same name.

The Great Patriotic War is the subject of some fifteen monuments, statues, tanks, busts, etc. in honor of the Red Army, a fighting unit, a glorious deed or a hero who died in combat to liberate the country from the Third Reich, such as the monument to the twelve patriots shot by the Germans on 7 March 1942.

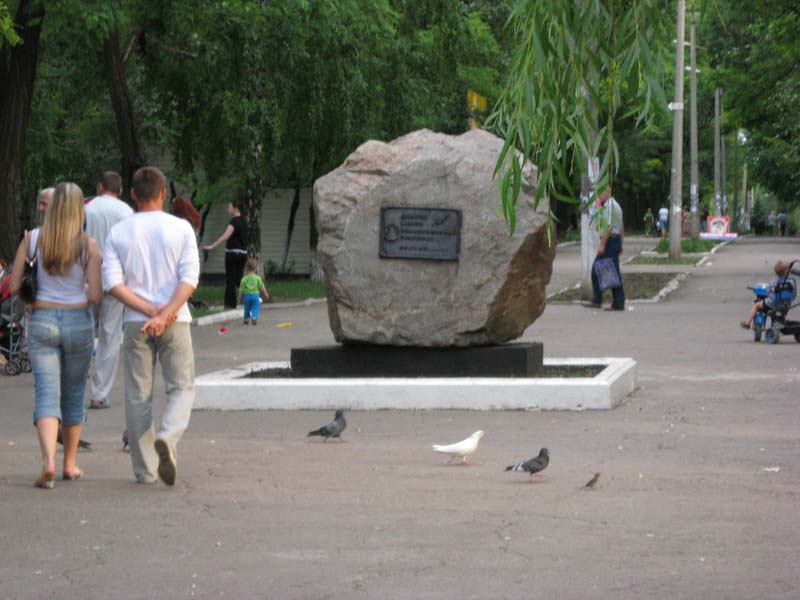
Chernobyl disaster memorial

A large statue commemorating the liberation of Donbass dominates the square on Nakhimov Avenue. The eternal flame burns before the monument to the victims of Nazism. A monument to the victims of Stalinism was erected on Theatre Square, as well as a large cross in 2008 at the main cemetery, in memory of the victims of the great famine of the 1920s following dekulakisation. A large stone with a commemorative plaque, in an alley off Lenin Avenue, commemorates the victims of Chernobyl.

There are also monuments to Makar Maza, Hryhoriy Yuriyovych Horban, K.P. Apatov, and Tolya Balabukha, to seamen–commandos, to pilots V.G. Semenyshyn and N.E. Lavytsky, and to soldiers of the Soviet 9th Aviation Division. The artists V. Konstantynov and L. Kuzminkov are the sculptors of some of the monuments, including the monument to Metropolitan Ignatiy, the founder of Mariupol, (1715–1786, canonized in 1998 by the Orthodox Church) erected near St. Nicholas Cathedral.

== Infrastructure ==
=== Architecture and construction ===
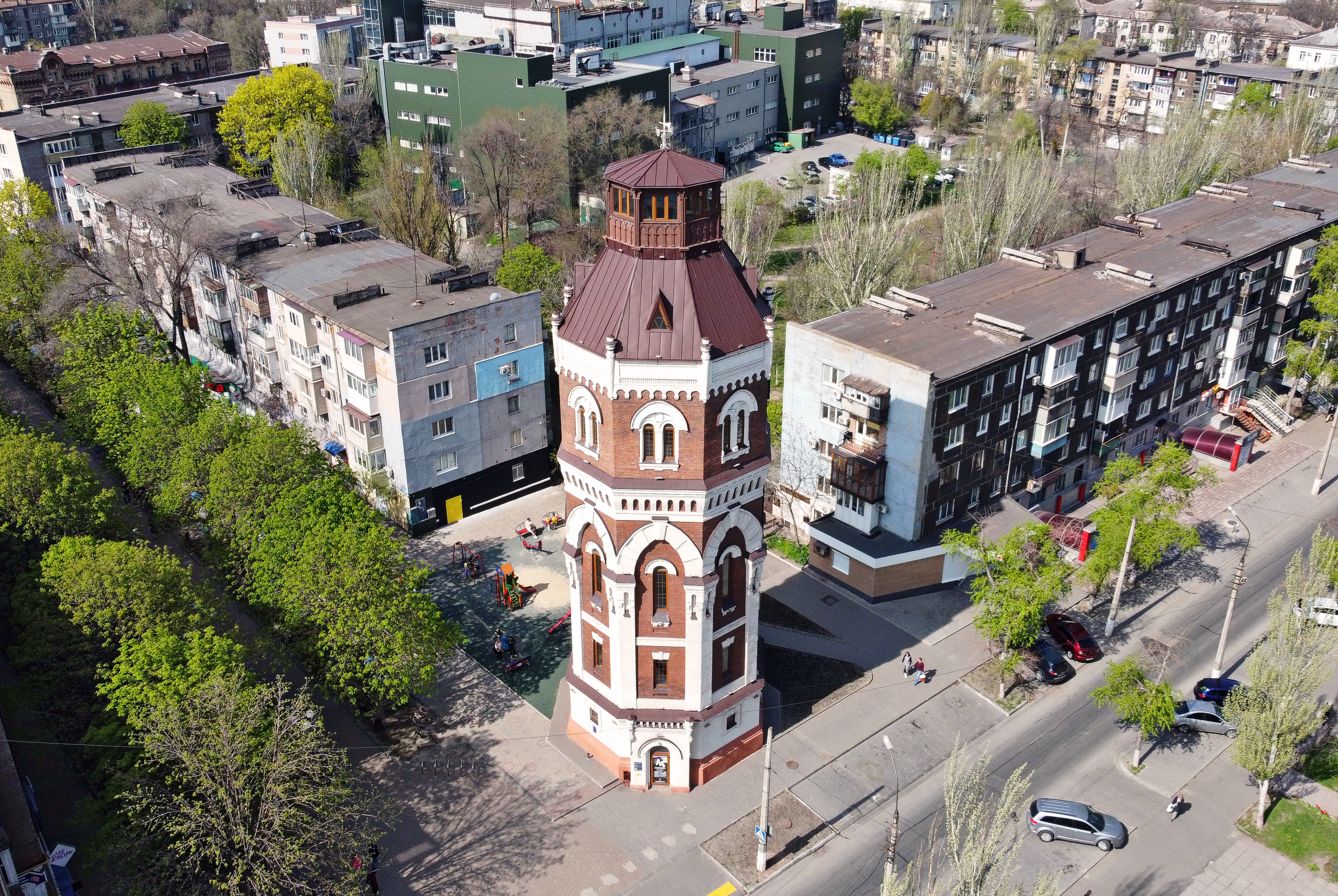
Old Water Tower

Old Mariupol is an area defined by the coast of the Sea of Azov to the south, the Kalmius River to the east, to the north by Shevchenko Boulevard, and to the west by Metalurhiv Avenue. It is made up mainly of low-rise buildings and has kept its pre-revolutionary architecture. Only Artem Street and Miru Avenue were built after World War II.

The central area of Mariupol (from Metalurhiv Avenue up to Budivelnykiv Avenue) is made up almost entirely of administrative and commercial buildings, including a city council building, a post office, the Lukov cinema, Mariupol State University of Humanities, Priazov State Technical University, the Korolenko central city library, and many large stores.

The architecture of other residential areas (Zakhidny, Skhidny, Kirov, Cheremushky, and 5th and 17th quarters) is not particularly distinctive or original and consists of typical apartment buildings of five to nine storeys.

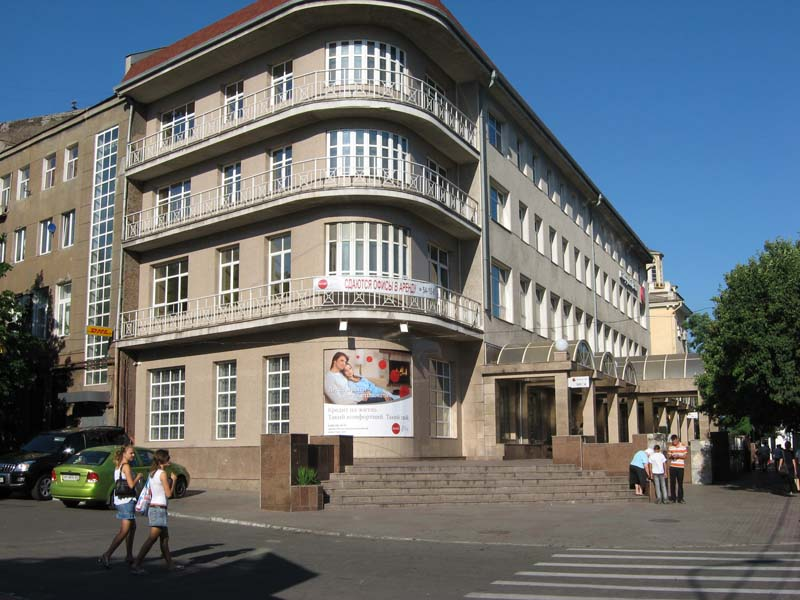
Urban architecture in central Mariupol

The term "Cheremushki" carries a special meaning in Russian culture and now also in Ukrainian; it usually refers to the newly settled parts of a city. The city's residential area covers 9.82 million square meters.

Industrial construction prevails. Mass building of habitable quarters within the city ended in the 1980s. Mainly under construction now are comfortable habitations. The city's construction industry for nine months of 2005 executed a volume of civil contract and building works of 304.4 million hrivnas (US$60 million). The city density on this parameter is 22.1%.

Mariupol was almost completely destroyed during the Russian siege of Mariupol in 2022.

=== Main streets ===
- Avenues: Miru, Metalurhiv, Budivelnykiv, Ilyich, Nakhimov, Peremohy, Lunin, and Leningradsky (in Livoberezhnyi District)
- Streets: Artem, Torhova, Apatov, Kuprin, Uritsky, Bakhchivandzhi, Gagarin, Karpinsky, Mamin-Sibiryak, Taganrog, Olympic, Azovstal, Makar Mazay, Karl Liebknecht
- Boulevards: Shevchenko, Morskyi, Prymore, Khmelnytskyi, etc.
- Squares: Administrative, Nezalezhnosti, Peremohy, Mashinobudivnykiv, Vioniv, Vyzvolennia.

=== Transportation ===
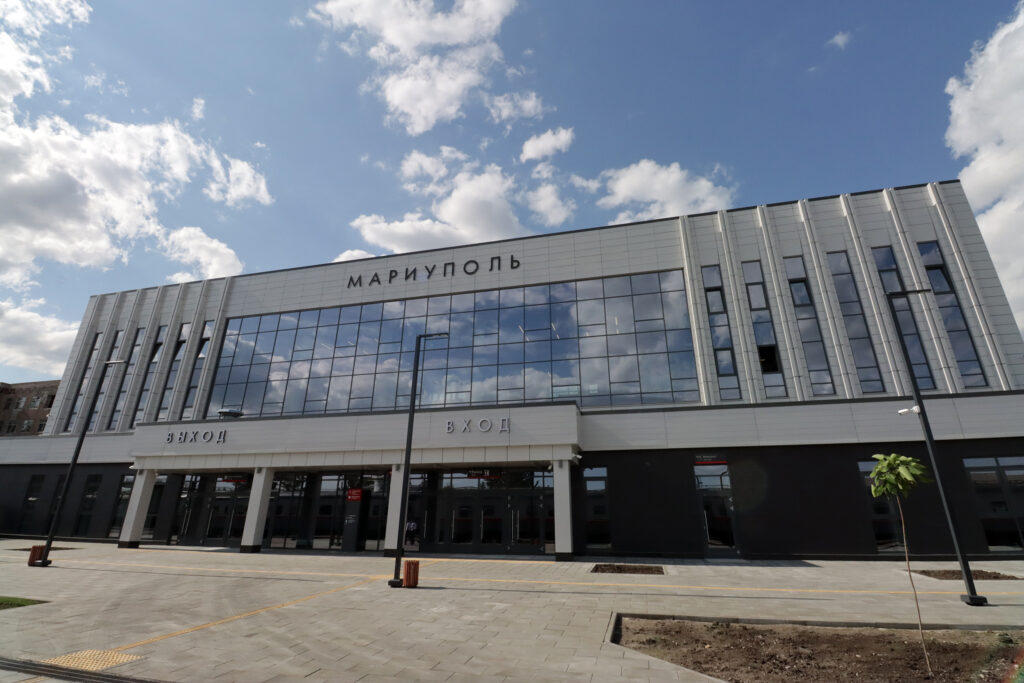
Mariupol Railway Station in 2024

- Mariupol railway station was reopened in July 2024. It is currently operated by Novorossiya Railway which manages infrastructure and operates freight and passenger train services in Donetsk People's Republic, Lugansk People's Republic, and Russian-controlled areas of Kherson and Zaporizhzhia oblasts.
- A marina near the Port of Mariupol.
- Mariupol International Airport has been closed since 2014.

=== City transport ===
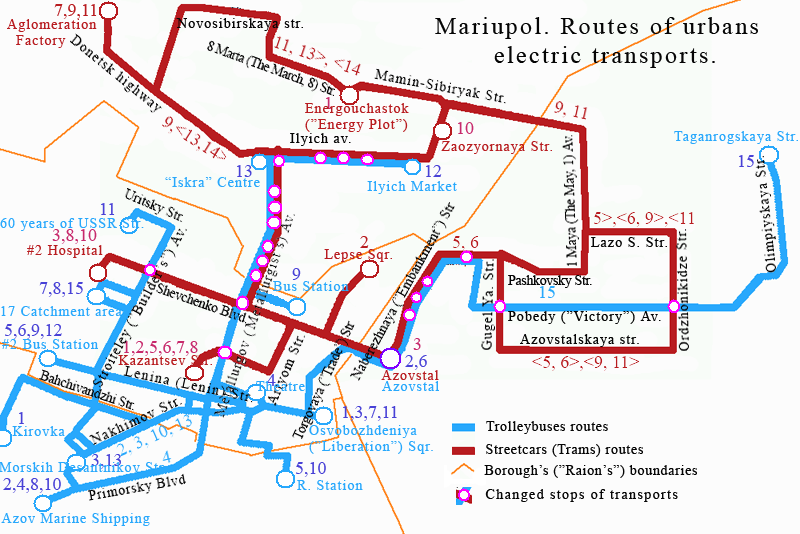
Routes of urban electric transports in Mariupol

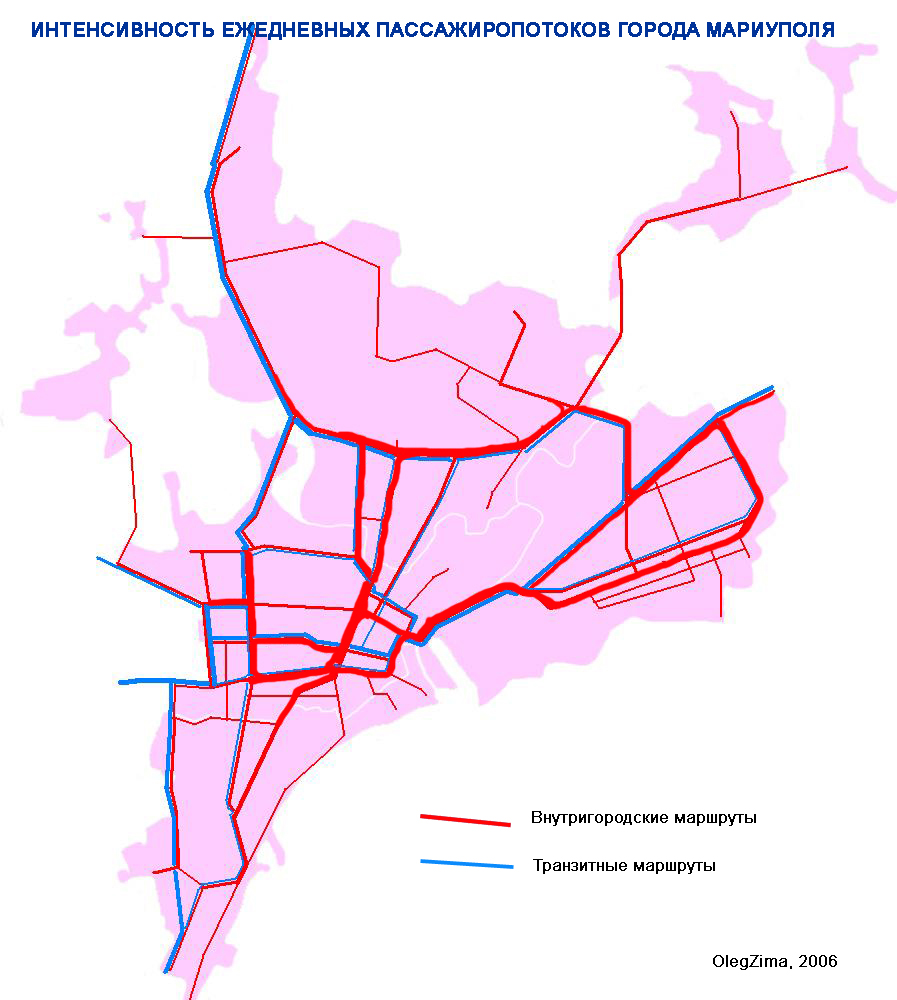
Daily passenger traffic intensity in Mariupol

Mariupol has transportation including bus transportation, trolleybuses, trams, and fixed-route taxis. The city is connected by railways, a seaport and the airport to other countries and cities.

- Urban electric transport (MTTU, Mariupol Tram-trolleybus management):
  - Trams, streetcars (since 1933) – 12 routes (models of type KTM-5 and KTM-8 operate),
  - Trolleybuses (since 1970) – 14 routes (machines of type: Škoda 14Tr, ZiU-10, ZiU-9, YuMZ T-1, YuMZ T-2, de:MAN SL 172 HO).
- Buses – mainly marshrutka (private minibuses), on suburban and long-distance routes.
- Road service station (which includes transportations to Taganrog, Rostov-upon-Don, Krasnodar, Kyiv, Odesa, Yalta, Dnipro are carried out, etc.) and a suburban auto station (with routes to Pershotravnevy, Volodarsky and areas of Donetsk oblast).

=== Communications ===
All leading Ukrainian mobile communications carriers have served Mariupol. In Soviet times, ten automatic telephone exchanges were operational; six digital automatic telephone exchanges were recently added.

=== Health service ===
There are 60 medical and medical-health establishments in the city — hospitals, polyclinics, the station of blood transfusion, urgent care clinics, sanatoriums, sanatoriums-preventive clinics, regional centre of social maintenance of pensionaries and invalids, city centres: gastroenterology, thoracic surgery, bleedings, pancreatic, microsurgery of the eye. Central pool-hospital on a water-carriage. The largest hospital is the Mariupol regional intensive care hospital.

== Education ==
Eight-one general educational establishments operated in Mariupol, including: 67 comprehensive schools (48,500 students), two grammar schools, three lyceums, four evening schools, three boarding schools, two private schools, eleven professional educational institutions (6,274 students), and 94 children's preschool establishments (12,700 children).

Three higher education establishments:

- Priazovsky State Technical University
- Mariupol State University
- Azovsky Institute of Marine Transport

== Local media ==
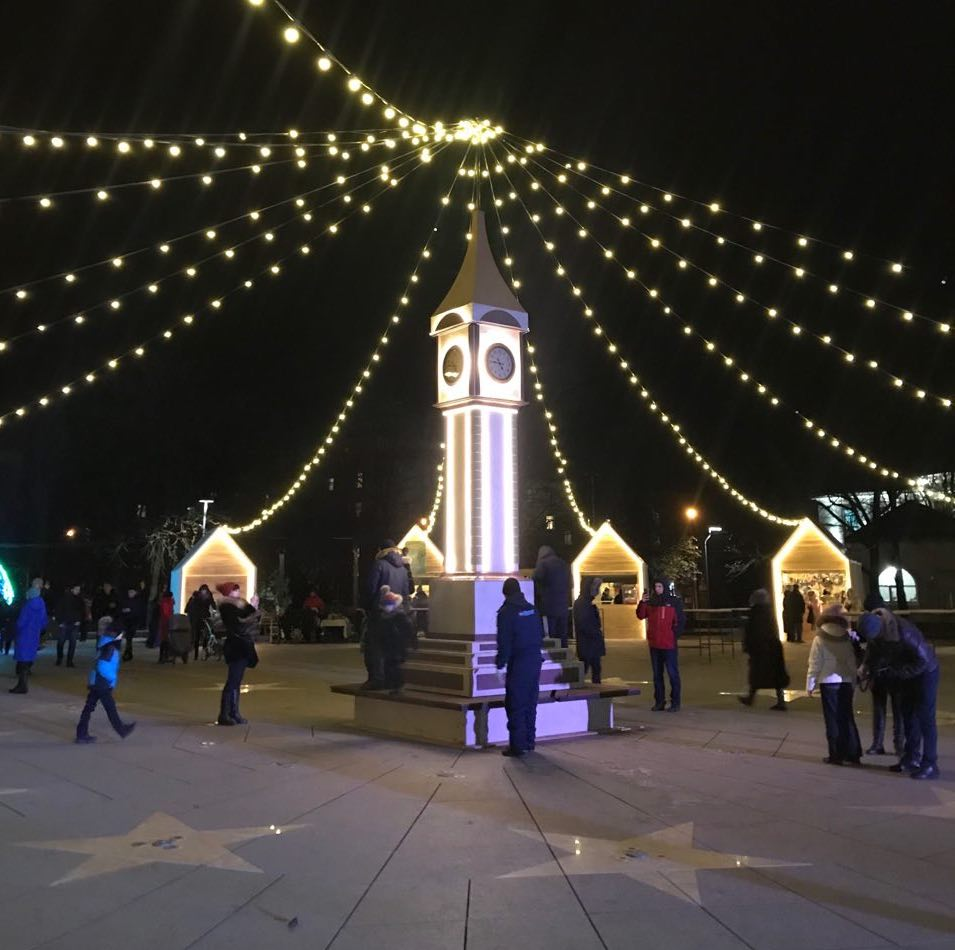
A Christmas market in Mariupol

More than 20 local newspapers are published, mostly in Russian, including:

- Priazovsky Rabochy (Priazovdky Worker)
- Mariupolskaya Zhizn (Mariupol Life)
- Mariupolskaya Nedelya (Mariupol Week)
- Ilyichevets
- Azovstalets
- Azovsky Moryak (Azov Seaman)
- Azovsky Mashinostroitel (Azov Machine-builder)

Twelve radio stations, and seven regional television companies and channels:

- Sigma Broadcasting Company
- MTV Broadcasting Company (Mariupol television)
- TV 7 Broadcasting Company
- Inter-Mariupol Broadcasting Company
- Format Broadcasting Company

Retransmitting about 15 national public channels (Inter, 1+1, STB, NTN, 5 Channel, ICTV, First National TV, New Channel, TV Company Ukraina, etc.)

== Public organizations ==
There are about 300 public associations, including 22 trade-union organizations, about 40 political parties, 16 youth groups, four women's organizations, 37 associations of veterans and disabled, and 134 national and cultural societies.

== Sports ==
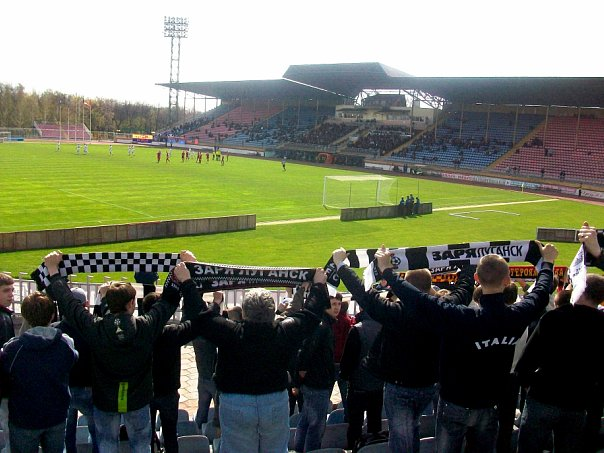
A football match in progress in Volodymyr Boyko Stadium.

Sportkompleks Illichivets

Mariupol is the hometown of the nationally famous swimmer Oleksandr Sydorenko who lived in the city until his death on 20 February 2022.

FC Mariupol was a football club, with a great sport traditions and a history of participation at the European level competitions.

The water polo team, the "Ilyichevets", is the undisputed champion of Ukraine. It has won the Ukrainian championship 11 times. Every year it plays in the European Champion Cup and Russian championship.

Azovstal' Canoeing Club on the Kalmius River. Vitaly Yepishkin – third place in the World Cup in the 200m K-2.

Azovmash Basketball Club, like the "Ilichevets" Water-polo Club, has numerous national championship titles. Significant successes were obtained as well by the Mariupol schools of boxing, Greco-Roman wrestling, artistic gymnastics, and other types of sport.

Sports building in the city (count 585):

- Volodymyr Boiko stadium
- Azovstal sports complex
- Azovets stadium (in the past known as Locomotive)
- Azovmash sports complex
- Sadko sports complex
- Vodnik sports complex
- Neptune public pool
- Azovstal chess club

== Notable people ==
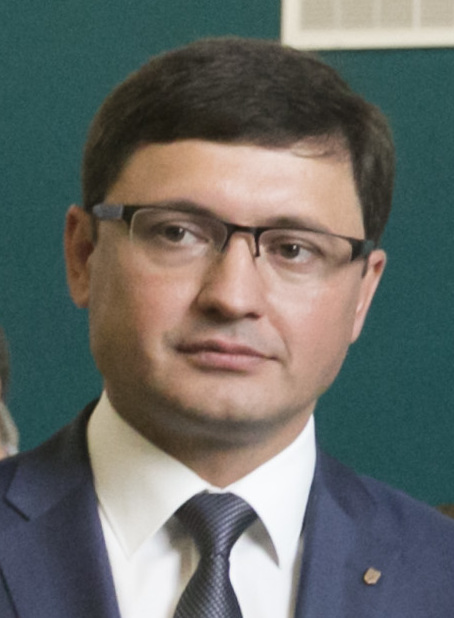
Vadym Boychenko, 2016

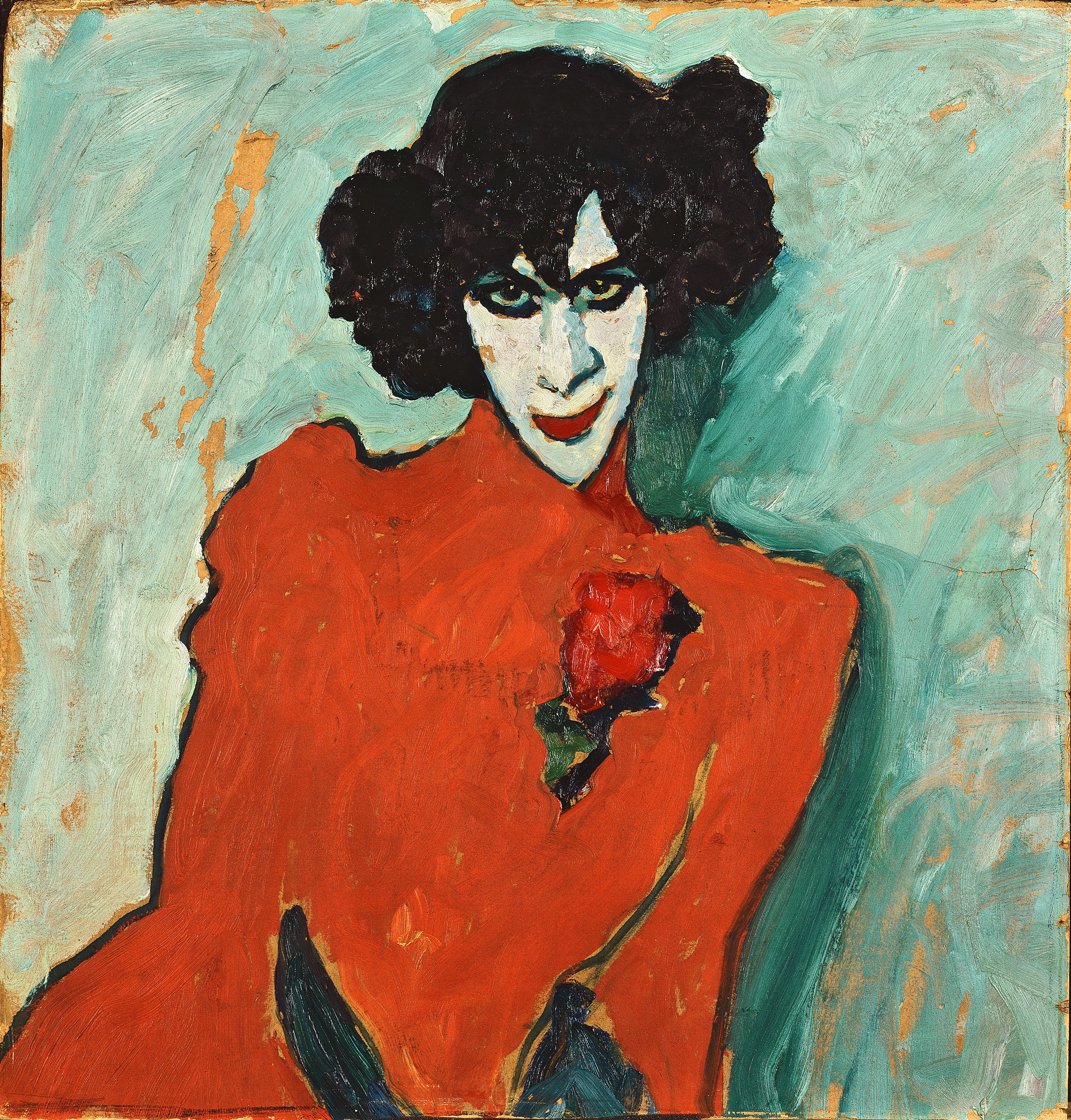
Portrait of Alexander Sakharoff, 1909

- Mikhail Averbakh (1872–1944), Russian and Soviet ophthalmologist
- Dmitry Aynalov (1862–1939), Soviet and Russian art historian and university professor
- Nikki Benz (born 1981), pornographic actress
- Vadym Boychenko (born 1977), Ukrainian politician, the Mayor of Mariupol
- Volodymyr Boyko (1938–2015), Ukrainian entrepreneur and politician
- Abram Budanov (1886–1929), Ukrainian anarchist military commander
- Diana Hajiyeva (born 1989), singer who represented Azerbaijan at the Eurovision Song Contest 2017
- Konstantin Ivashchenko (born 1963), politician and businessman, de facto Mayor of Mariupol
- Felix Krivin (1928–2016), Soviet, Ukrainian and Israeli poet, author and screenwriter
- Semen Kryvonos (born 1983), Ukrainian civil servant and Director of the National Anti-Corruption Bureau
- Arkhip Kuindzhi (1842–1910), Ukrainian landscape painter of Pontic Greek descent
- Leonid Lukov (1909–1963), Soviet film director and screenwriter.
- Ivan Ivanovich Mavrov (1936–2009), physician
- Julie Pelipas (born 1984), Ukrainian stylist and local fashion director of Vogue
- Vyacheslav Polozov (born 1950), opera singer and professor of voice
- Alexander Sakharoff (1886–1963), Russian Empire dancer, teacher and choreographer
- Olgierd Straszyński (1903–1971), Polish conductor
- Serhiy Taruta (born 1955), Ukrainian businessman and politician (Batkivshchyna), who served as the governor of the Donetsk Oblast
- Mykola Trofymenko (born 1985), Ukrainian academic political scientist
- Voron Viacheslav (born 1967), singer, composer and music producer
- Viacheslav Voron (born 1967), singer-songwriter of the Russian and Ukrainian chanson
- Sergey Voychenko (1955–2004), Belarusian artist and designer.
- Alfred Wintle MC (1897–1966), British military officer and one of London's great eccentrics
- Oleksandr Yaroslavskyi (born 1959), wealthy Ukrainian businessman
- Anna Zatonskih (born 1978), Ukrainian American chess player
- Andrei Zhdanov (1896–1948), Soviet politician and cultural ideologist
- Yaroslav Zheleznyak (born 1989), Ukrainian politician and People's Deputy of Ukraine (Holos)

=== Sport ===
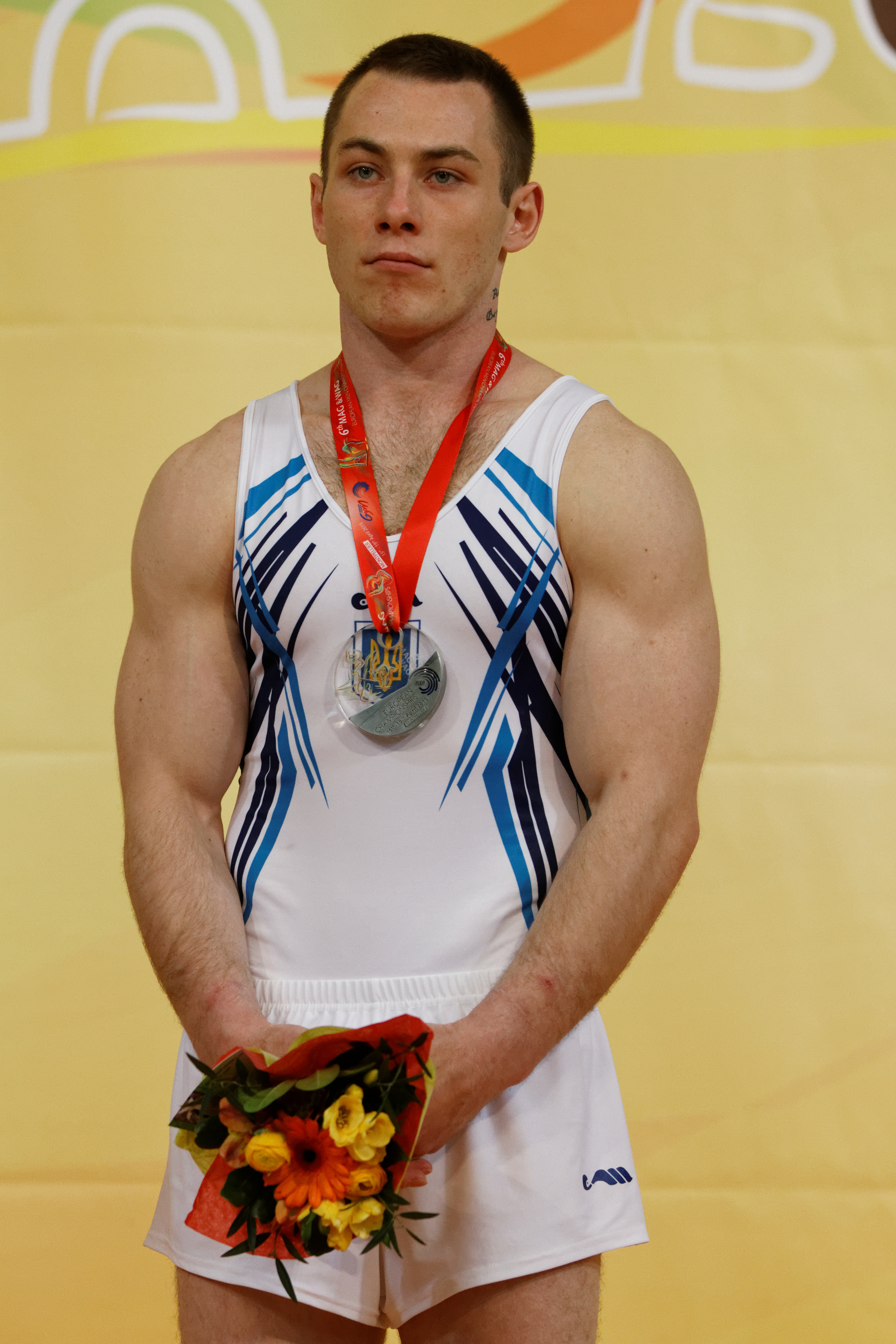
Ihor Radivilov, 2015

- Sergei Baltacha, (born 1958), former 1988 European Football Championship runner-up
- Oleksandr Haydash (born 1967), former Ukrainian Russian football striker with 437 club caps
- Oleh Kyryukhin (born 1975), a light flyweight boxer, bronze medallist at the 1996 Summer Olympics
- Alexander Oleinik (born 1986), kickboxer and Muay Thai fighter
- Vyacheslav Oliynyk (born 1966), Ukrainian wrestler and gold medallist at the 1996 Summer Olympics
- Eduard Piskun (born 1967), a Ukrainian former football player with over 450 club caps
- Viktor Prokopenko (1944–2007), a Ukrainian football player and coach
- Ihor Radivilov (born 1992), Olympic, world and European medalist in gymnastics
- Oleksandr Sydorenko (1960–2022), individual medley swimmer, gold medallist at the 1980 Summer Olympics
- Tetiana Ustiuzhanina (born 1965), competitive rower, team bronze medallist at the 1992 Summer Olympics
- Oleksandr Volkov (born 1961), a former Soviet footballer with 515 club caps and Ukrainian football manager

== Sister cities ==
=== Before 2022 ===
City	Country	Since
Feodosia	Ukraine	11 September 1993
Kherson	Ukraine	11 September 1993
Lviv	Ukraine	10 September 1994
Kolomyia (Note: The original cooperation agreement was lost as a result of a fire in the building of the Mariupol City Council)	Ukraine	1 October 1998
Makiivka	Ukraine	21 April 2000
Bakhchysarai	Ukraine	17 February 2012
Slavuta	Ukraine	28 July 2015
Pereiaslav	Ukraine	27 March 2017
Savona	Italy	30 September 1991
Santa Severina	Italy	23 May 2005
Thessaloniki	Greece	12 September 1993
Piraeus	Greece	1993
Kalymnos	Greece	25 June 1998
Kythnos	Greece	2 October 2010
Qiqihar	China	12 October 2007
Trabzon	Turkey	27 November 2007
Gdańsk	Poland	12 December 2014

=== 2022–present ===
On 24 May 2022, following the setting up of a Russian occupational administration in Mariupol, the city was twinned with Saint Petersburg. It was twinned with Grozny on 10 August 2023. An art symbol of the twinning that was unveiled on Palace Square in Saint Petersburg was defaced. It disappeared at a later date.
