= Mospyne =

City in Donetsk Oblast, Ukraine

Mospyne Моспине
- City
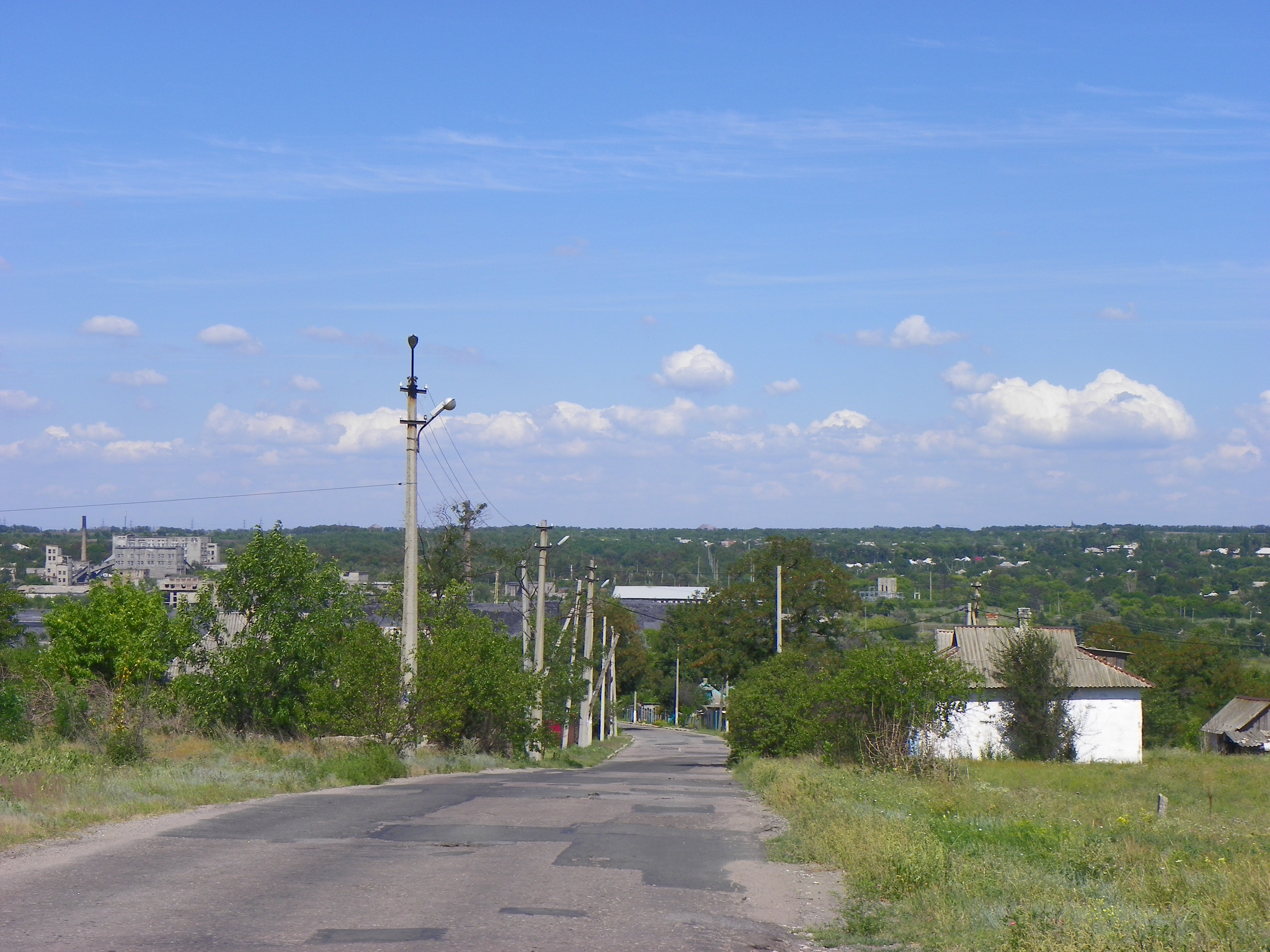
- Interactive map of Mospyne
- Location within Donetsk Oblast Location within Ukraine
- Coordinates: 47°54′N 38°04′E
- Country: Ukraine
- Oblast: Donetsk Oblast
- Raion: Donetsk Raion
- Hromada: Donetsk urban hromada
- Founded: 1800
- Urban-type settlement status: 1925
- City status: 1938

Government
  - Mayor: Mykhailo Mykolayovych Merenkov
- Area: 13.93 km^{2} (5.38 sq mi)
- Elevation: 100 m (330 ft)
- Population (2022): 10,471▼
  - Density: 751.7/km^{2} (1,947/sq mi)
- Time zone: UTC+2 (EET)
  - Summer (DST): UTC+3 (EEST)
- Postal code: 83492-83497
- Area code: +380 622
- KATOTTH code: 1410160500

Mospyne (Ukrainian: Моспине, pronounced [ˈmɔspɪne]; Russian: Моспино, romanized: Mospino) is a city in the Proletarskyi District of Donetsk urban hromada, Donetsk Raion, Donetsk Oblast in Ukraine, 8 km (26,000 ft) southeast of Donetsk. The population is estimated as 10,471 (2022 estimate) while the population in 2001 was recorded as 11,736. Since 2014, the city has been under the control of the self-declared Donetsk People's Republic. The city's area is 13.93 km^{2} (5.38 sq mi).

With the Mospyne railway station, the city serves as a junction for freight and passenger trains. The city belongs to the Donetsk-Makiivka urban agglomeration within the Donets Coal Basin and lies on the Hruzka river (a tributary of the Kalmius which flows into the Azov sea). There are also several small rivers within the area of the city. The city has 267 m^{2} (2,870 sq ft) of green space per capita. The average temperature in January is −6.5 °C (20.3 °F) while in July it's +22 °C (72 °F). There is 500 mm (20 in) of precipitation per year.

== History ==
In the area of the city, artifacts dating from the Middle Paleolithic and Mesolithic periods were discovered. Among the findings included a monument of the Donets culture, a burial site of a Sarmatian warrior with an iron sword, a bronze fibula, a figurative black jug of Chernyakhov culture and common clay pot. The Mospyne archaeological site, a notable pre-historic hunting site in the vicinity of the city dating to the Middle Stone Age, has been the subject of research and is the namesake for the Mospyne cultural group of the Hrebenik culture of the late Mesolithic era.

The city is recorded as being established in 1800, with a settlement called Ust-Ocheretynsk appearing in the areas of Mospyne that year. At some year after, the landowner Tuzlov settled here and founded the settlement of Tuzlivka, which was later merged with Ust-Ocheretynsk to form the village Makhorivka. Beginning in the second half of the 19th century, it was part of the Stepanivka-Krynivka volost of Taganroz district, Don Army region.

Industrial coal mining began in the settlement in the same period, with many small mines being constructed across the area and the village transitioning into a mining town. Railroad tracks were also built to assist the growing coal industry, with the notable financial support of entrepreneurs Mospin, Shabalov, and Utkin. By the start of the 20th century, the Mospyne railway station was built in the settlement, named after Mospin. The name of the station was later extended to the rest of the mining town.

During the Ukrainian War of Independence, from 1918 to 1920, the settlement switched hands multiple times. On 13 May 1919, Andrei Shkuro's Volunteer Army battled with the Makhnovshchina for control of Mospyne, resulting in the White movement capturing the city and the Makhnovists being driven back. The city ultimately was taken under the control of Red Army troops at the end of the war. Afterwards, it was administratively part of the Donets Governorate of Ukraine. The city was affected by the Holodomor, which killed 429 identified people in the city from 1932 to 1933.

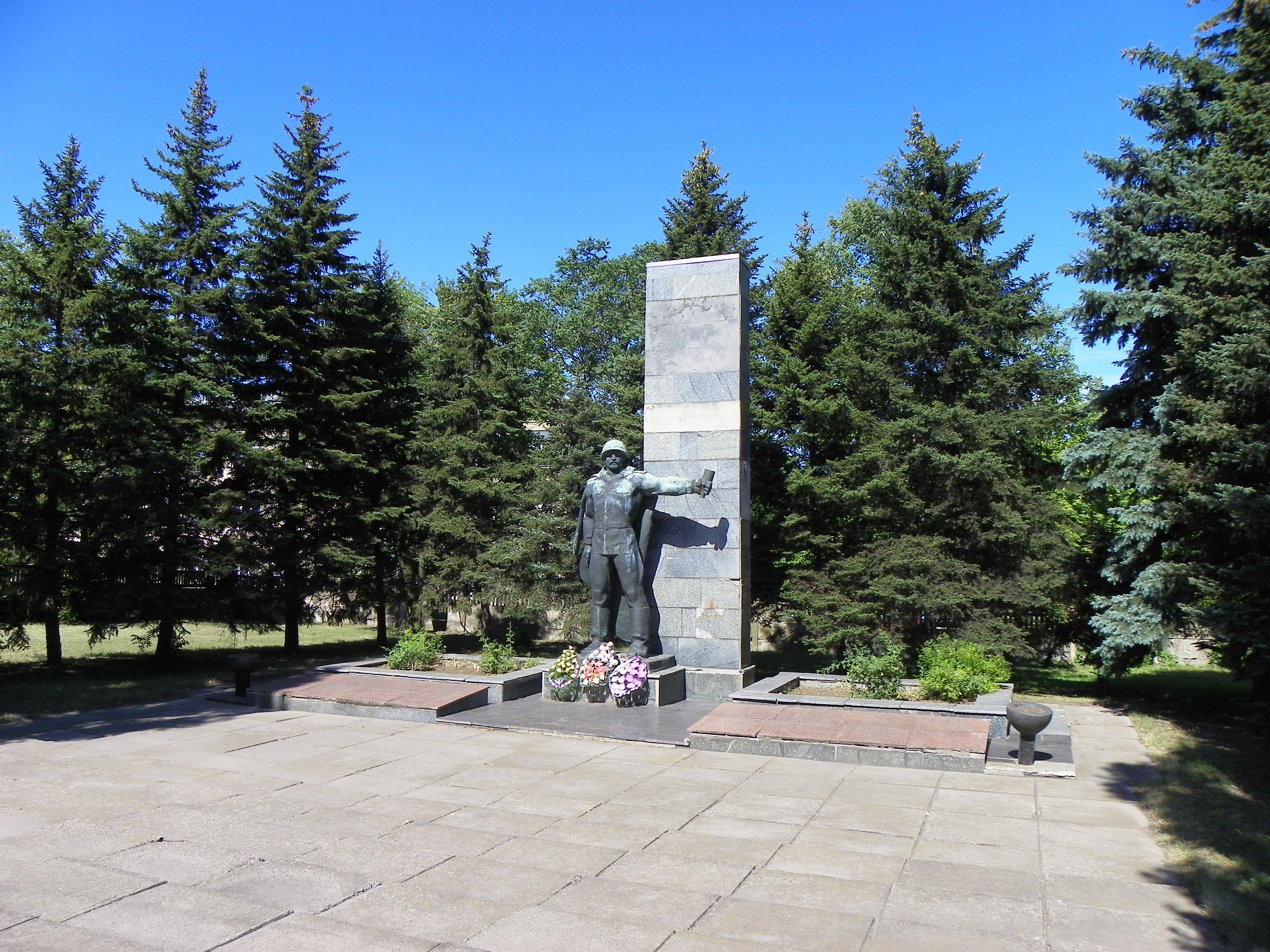
Mass grave of Soviet soldiers

During World War II, from 24 October 1941, to 6 September 1943, the city came under German occupation. On the eastern front in World War II, 2,600 soldiers from the city fought with 623 killed in action. Of the soldiers, 487 were awarded orders and medals for their military service.

During the War in Donbas, on 30 July 2014, Ukrainian forces killed more than 50 separatists in the city as part of reconnaissance operations. On 15 August, Ukrainian troops became surrounded by separatist militants near the city during an offensive. On the night of 18–19 August, militants shelled the city with artillery, destroying a number of residential buildings. During the war, separatists shelling caused a fire to break out in school No. 151, destroying the school's roof and third floor.

On 24 May 2024, during the full-scale Russian invasion of Ukraine, the Ukrainian military conducted strikes using MGM-140 ATACMS near the city, reportedly destroying a Russian S-400 missile system.

== Administrative status ==
The city was founded in the 1800s as the village Makhorivka. From 1919 to 1925, the settlement was part of Donetsk gubernia. In the period from 1923 to 1930, the settlement was part of the Stalin raion (district), previously named Yuziv raion until 1924. The city and raion became part of the oblast in 1932 (which was called Stalino oblast from 1938 to 1962). At various times, it was administratively part of Makiivka and Khartsyzsk raions.

In 1925, Mospyne gained the Soviet created status of an urban-type settlement. In 1938, the city was renamed to Mospyne and designated a city of regional significance. The city is the administrative center of the Mospyne City Council, an administrative-territorial unit and local self-government entity subordinated since 1958 to Donetsk City Council (centered in Donetsk). The Mospyne City Council includes Mospyne in addition to the town of Horbachevo-Mykhaylivka and the villages of Byryuky, Verbova Balka, Hryshky, Kyslyche (previously named Oktyabrske until 2016), Mykhailivka, Novodvirske, and Temryuk. Mospyne's city council, together with the Laryne settlement council (which includes the former urban-type settlement of Laryne and the village of Pavlohradske), are the only two councils subordinated to the Donetsk City Council. Since 1980, Mospyne has also been a part of Donetsk city's Proletarskyi District, one of the city's nine urban districts. The village Dolintarove (also called Artem) was merged into the area of the city.

On 18 July 2020, the enactment of major administrative reform laws removed Mospyne's city of regional significance designation and merged it into the newly expanded Donetsk Raion (district). In addition, the reform created hromadas, new political subdivisions within each raion to handle local government tasks and financing, with Mospyne being included in territory of the newly created Donetsk urban hromada (to be administratively centered in Donetsk). Due to the then-ongoing Donbas War and occupation of the city and surrounding areas by the separatist forces of the Donetsk People's Republic (DPR), the new administrative subdivisions remained de jure and the city's DPR government continued to maintain the pre-reform administrative designations and divisions.

== Demographics ==
Population census

Year	Pop.	±% p.a.
1939	14,986	—
1959	18,002	+0.92%
1970	16,955	−0.54%
1975	17,100	+0.17%
1979	14,638	−3.81%
1989	13,500	−0.81%

Year	Pop.	±% p.a.
2001	11,736	−1.16%
2005	11,265	−1.02%
2010	10,827	−0.79%
2014	10,745	−0.19%
2022	10,471	−0.32%

Ethnicity

Mospyne is one of a few cities in the Donetsk Oblast, in which ethnic Russians make up the largest ethnic group, accounting for 51% of the population, which is also the second-highest percentage recorded (after Bunhe) in any major settlement in the region. Ethnic Ukrainians are the second-largest ethnic group, other notable minorities are Ukrainian Greeks and Belarusians. The exact ethnic composition in 2001 was as follows:

Ethnic groups in Mospyne
	percent
Russians	51.52%
Ukrainians	46.50%
Belarusians	0.66%
Ukrainian Greeks	0.32%
Georgians	0.13%
Moldovans	0.12%
Armenians	0.09%

First languages

Native language as of the Ukrainian Census of 2001:

First languages in Mospyne
	percent
Russian	93.47%
Ukrainian	6.35%
Belarusian	0.02%
Moldovan	0.01%
others	0.15%

== Economy ==
In the mid-1970s, there were six schools in the city, with 166 teachers and 2,853 students. There were two theaters with 500 seats, three libraries with a collection of over 35,000 books, a hospital (Donetsk city hospital No. 12), and a pharmacy. The city employed 110 medical workers, including 32 doctors. Since the beginning of the 2010s, there have been five secondary schools and two kindergartens located in the city and its immediate surroundings. Over 40% of those employed in the city work in industry, with main employers being the Mospynska mine, the Mospinskaya central processing plant, the Mospinsky mechanical repair plant, and the city's dairy and bread factories.

The Mospinsky mechanical repair plant, established in 1946, operates a foundry, forging and other production facilities. The plant serves enrichment plants in Donetsk, Luhansk and Dnipropetrovsk oblasts and manufactures over 2,000 various mechanical items, including dredgers, scraper winches, pumps, mine machinery, welded pipes, battery dust collectors, blowers, jigging machines, centrifuges, belt conveyors, locking valves, hydrocyclones, and heaters. At the request of the church, the plant has created bells using older technologies. The plant applies a coating composed of monolithic polycrystalline silicon carbide on manufactured items to significantly increase their wear resistance.

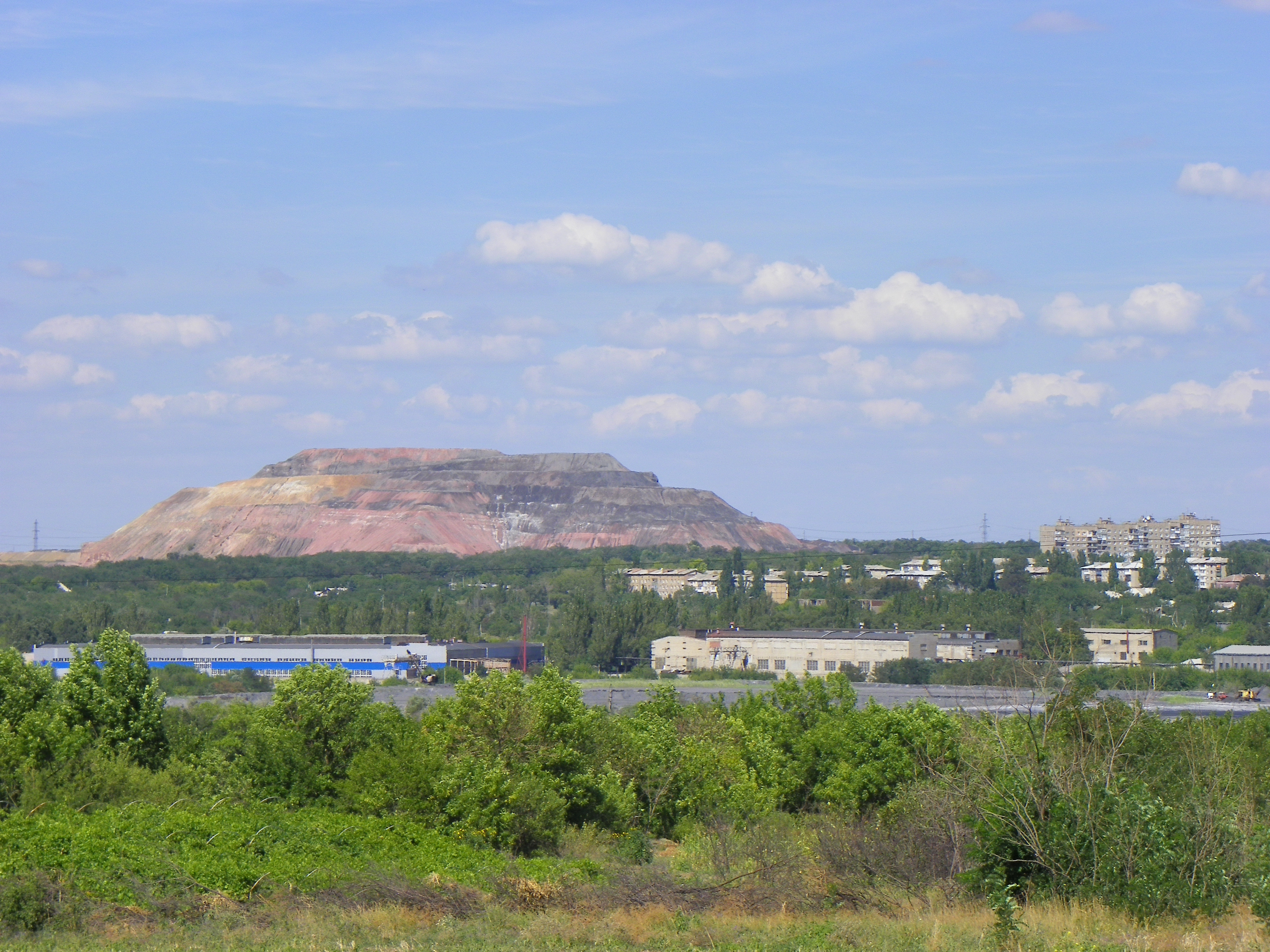
Spoil heap of Mospyne coal preparation plant

In 1962, the Mospinskaya central processing plant in the city was built, with a designed output capacity of 1.2 million tons per year although it was recorded as achieving an output of 2 million tons per year. Additional major establishments opened in the city during the Soviet era include new dairy and bread factories and numerous large poultry farms, particularly the Budenovsky, Mospino, and Proletarskaya poultry farms.

In 1937, the city's Novo-Mospyne mine was built (later renamed Mospynska). From 1950 to 2014, a total of 64 miners were killed at the mine. The mine experienced a significant decrease in output in the 1990s, falling from an annual output of 800 tons per day in 1990 to 230 tons per day in 1999. The mine was planned to be closed in the period 2011 to 2015 as part of a governmental policy regarding the region.

== Sights ==
Amongst notable cultural sights in the city include the Yunost Palace of Culture, Biryuki Theater, and Ukrainian Orthodox Church (Moscow Patriarchate)'s Church of St. Peter and Paul.

== See also ==
- List of cities in Donetsk Oblast
