= Prydniprovske =

Prydniprovske (Ukrainian: Придніпровське) may refer to several populated places in Ukraine:

- Prydniprovske, Dnipropetrovsk Oblast
- Prydniprovske, Zaporizhzhia Oblast
- Prydniprovske, Cherkasy Oblast
- Prydniprovske, Kherson Oblast

== See also ==
- Prydniprovskyi District, Cherkasy
- Prydniprovska State Academy of Civil Engineering and Architecture
- Prydniprovsky Chemical Plant radioactive dumps
