= Cathedral of St. Nicholas, Mariupol =

Saint Nicholas's Cathedral Mariupol Ukraine

Cathedral of St. Nicholas
- Свято Микільський катедральний собор.
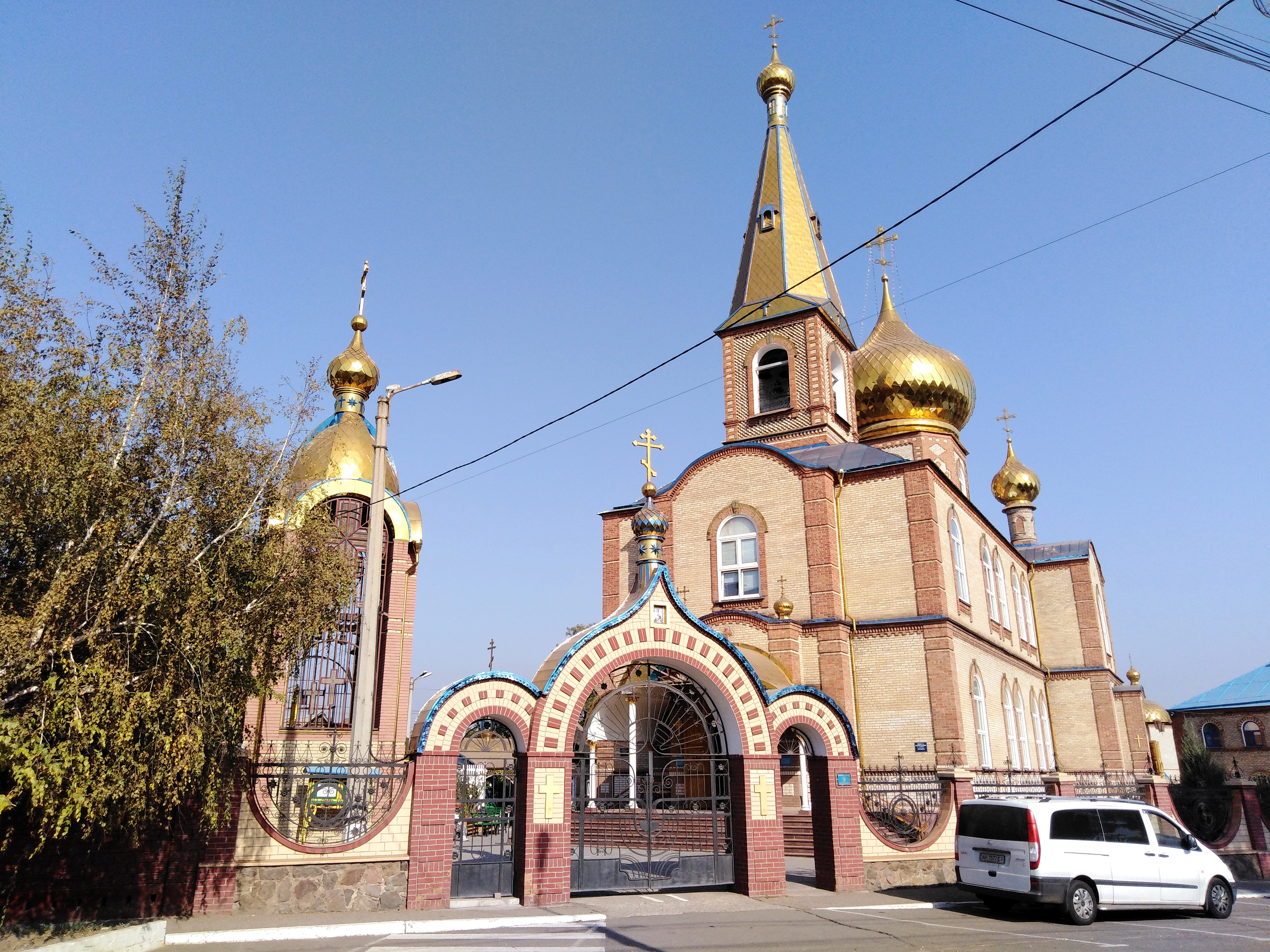
- Cathedral of St. Nicholas
- Cathedral of St. Nicholas
- 47°06′45″N 37°32′50″E
- Location: Mariupol, Donetsk Oblast, 87529
- Country: Ukraine
- Denomination: Ukrainian Orthodox (Moscow Patriarchate)

History
- Status: active

Architecture
- Years built: 1991
- Groundbreaking: 1989

Administration
- Diocese: Donetsk Eparchy

Clergy
- Bishop(s): Shukalo Roman Vasilyevich, Metropolitan Hilarion of Donetsk and Mariupol

Cathedral of Saint Nicholas (Ukrainian: Свято Микільський катедральний собор) is a Ukrainian Orthodox church located in the Tsentralnyi District, Mariupol, Ukraine.

== General Information ==
The cathedral is a six-domed church, built between 1989 and 1991 and designed by the architects AD Kljujew & NJ Erenburg (Russian: А. Д. Клюєв & Н. Ю. Еренбург). The artist Sergej Alekseevich Barannik decorated the church.

In 2022, during the Siege of Mariupol, the cathedral was heavily damaged.

== Gallery ==
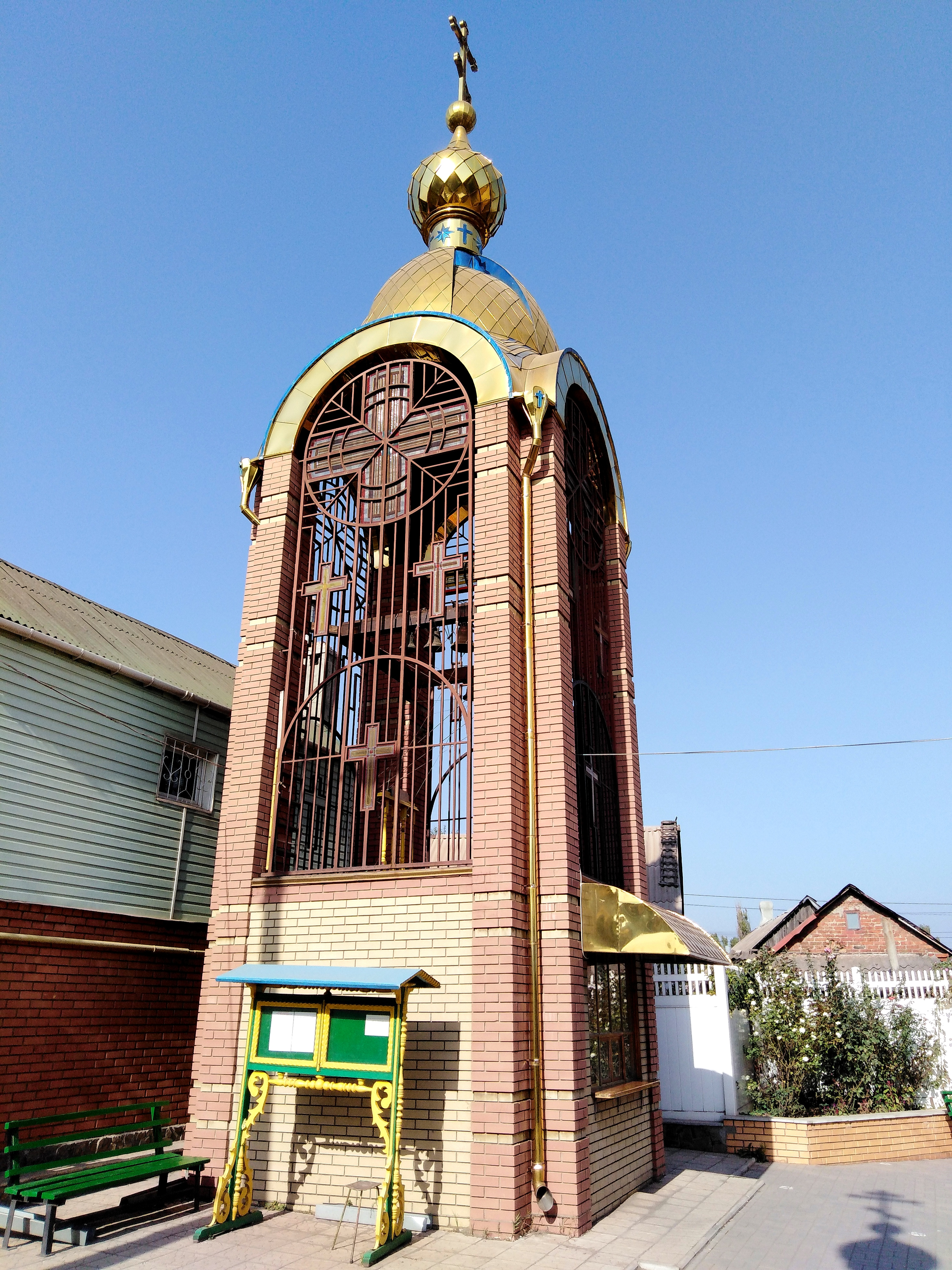

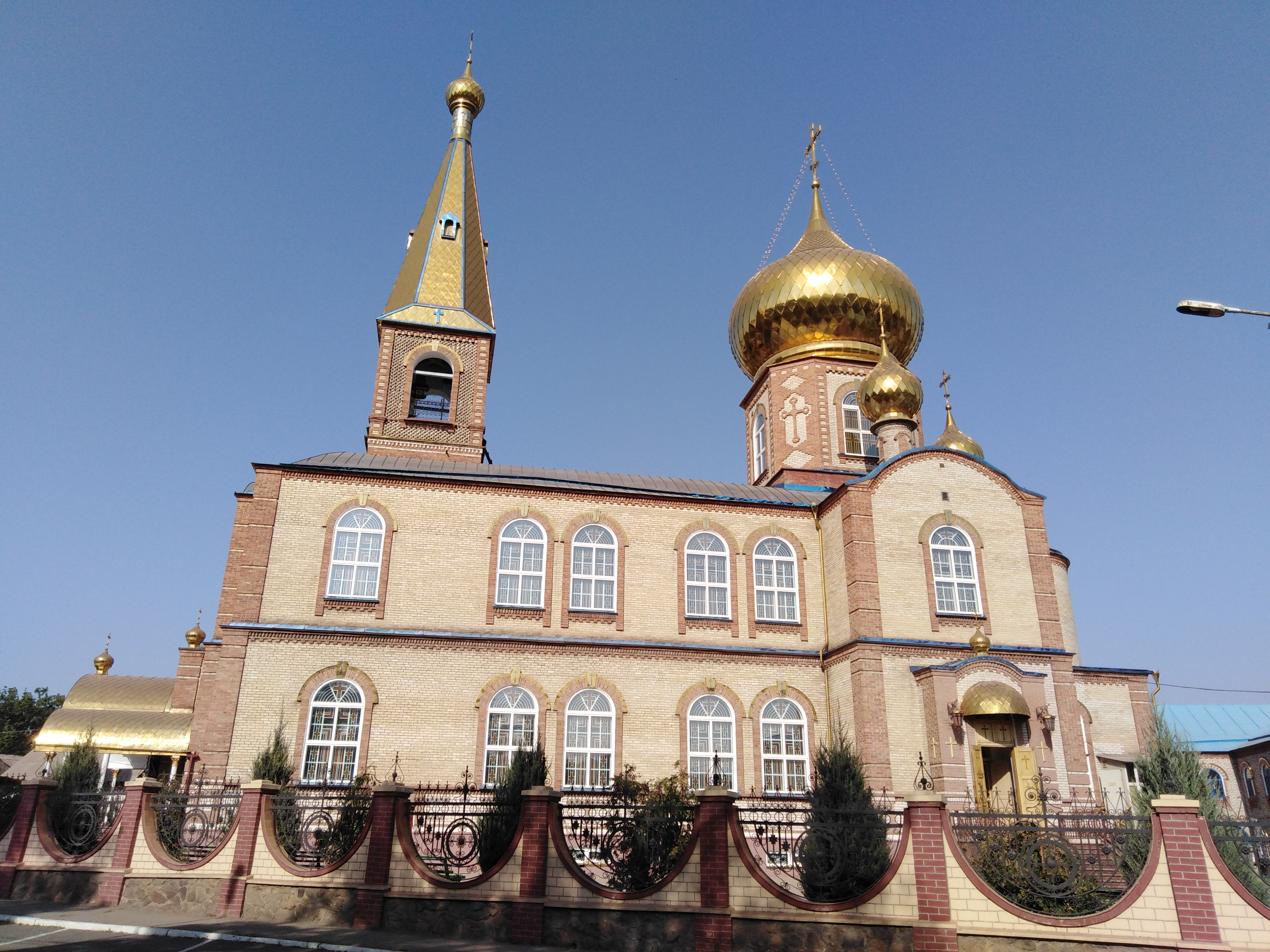

== See also ==
- List of cathedrals in Ukraine
