= Prymorskyi District =

Prymorskyi District may refer to the following places in Ukraine:

- Prymorskyi District, Mariupol
- Prymorskyi District, Odesa
- Prymorskyi District, Zaporizhzhia Oblast
