= Oleksandrivka, Donetsk Raion, Donetsk Oblast =

Oleksandrivka Олександрівка Александровка
- Rural settlement
- Location of Oleksandrivka Oleksandrivka (Ukraine)
- Coordinates: 47°55′15″N 37°34′30″E
- Country: Ukraine
- Oblast: Donetsk Oblast
- Raion: Donetsk Raion
- Hromada: Donetsk urban hromada

Area
  - Total: 0.82 km^{2} (0.32 sq mi)
- Elevation: 171 m (561 ft)

Population (2022)
  - Total: 3,885
  - Density: 4,700/km^{2} (12,000/sq mi)
- Time zone: UTC+2 (EET)
  - Summer (DST): UTC+3 (EEST)
- Postal code: 85660-85661
- Area code: +380 6278

Oleksandrivka (Ukrainian: Олександрівка) is a rural settlement in Donetsk urban hromada, Donetsk Raion, Donetsk Oblast in Ukraine. According to Russia, which militarily occupies the territory, it is administered under Marinka Raion. Population: 3,885 (2022 estimate).

== Demographics ==
Native language as of the Ukrainian Census of 2001:

- Ukrainian 94.22%
- Russian 5.54%
- Belarusian 0.05%
- Others 0.02%
