= Staromykhailivka =

Staromykhailivka Старомихайлівка
- Rural settlement
- Interactive map of Staromykhailivka
- Location within Donetsk Oblast Location within Ukraine
- Coordinates: 47°59′56″N 37°35′01″E
- Country: Ukraine
- Oblast: Donetsk Oblast
- Raion: Donetsk Raion
- Hromada: Donetsk urban hromada

Population
  - Total: 5,091
- Time zone: UTC+2 (EET)
  - Summer (DST): UTC+3 (EEST)
- Postal code: 85636

Staromykhailivka (Ukrainian: Старомихайлівка), sometimes transcribed as Staromikhailovka (Russian: Старомихайловка), is a rural settlement in Donetsk urban hromada, Donetsk Raion, Donetsk Oblast in Ukraine. Due to occupation of the settlement and other eastern portions of Marinka Raion by Russian forces, in 2020 the raion was dissolved and most of it still controlled by Ukraine merged with Volnovakha Raion. Population: 5,091 (2022 estimate).

Staromykhailivka is located on banks of Lozova river which is a tributary of Vovcha. Staromykhailivka is a suburb of Donetsk bordering the Donetsk's Abakumova neighborhood (microdistrict). The settlement has population of 5,337 (2011).

The settlement was established in 1747 by Mykhailo Motsahor and was known as Mykhailivka.

Starting Mid-April 2014 Russian proxy forces captured several towns in Donetsk Oblast; including Staromykhailivka. On 2 August 2014 the National Security and Defense Council of Ukraine confirmed reports that Ukrainian forces had recaptured control of Staromykhailivka from pro-Russian insurgents.

As of October 2016, the settlement was under control of pro-Russian forces.

== Demographics ==
As of the Ukrainian national census in 2001, Staromykhailivka had a population of 5,333 inhabitants. The linguistic composition of the population was as follows:

Languages in Staromykhailivka
	percent
Ukrainian	72.4%
Russian	27.3%
Belarusian	0.1%
Armenian	0.1%
others	0.1%

== Notable people ==
- Pavlo Hryshchenko (born 1990), Ukrainian footballer
