= Petrovskyi District =

Coordinates: 47°57′N 37°37′E

Petrovskyi District Петровський район
- Urban district
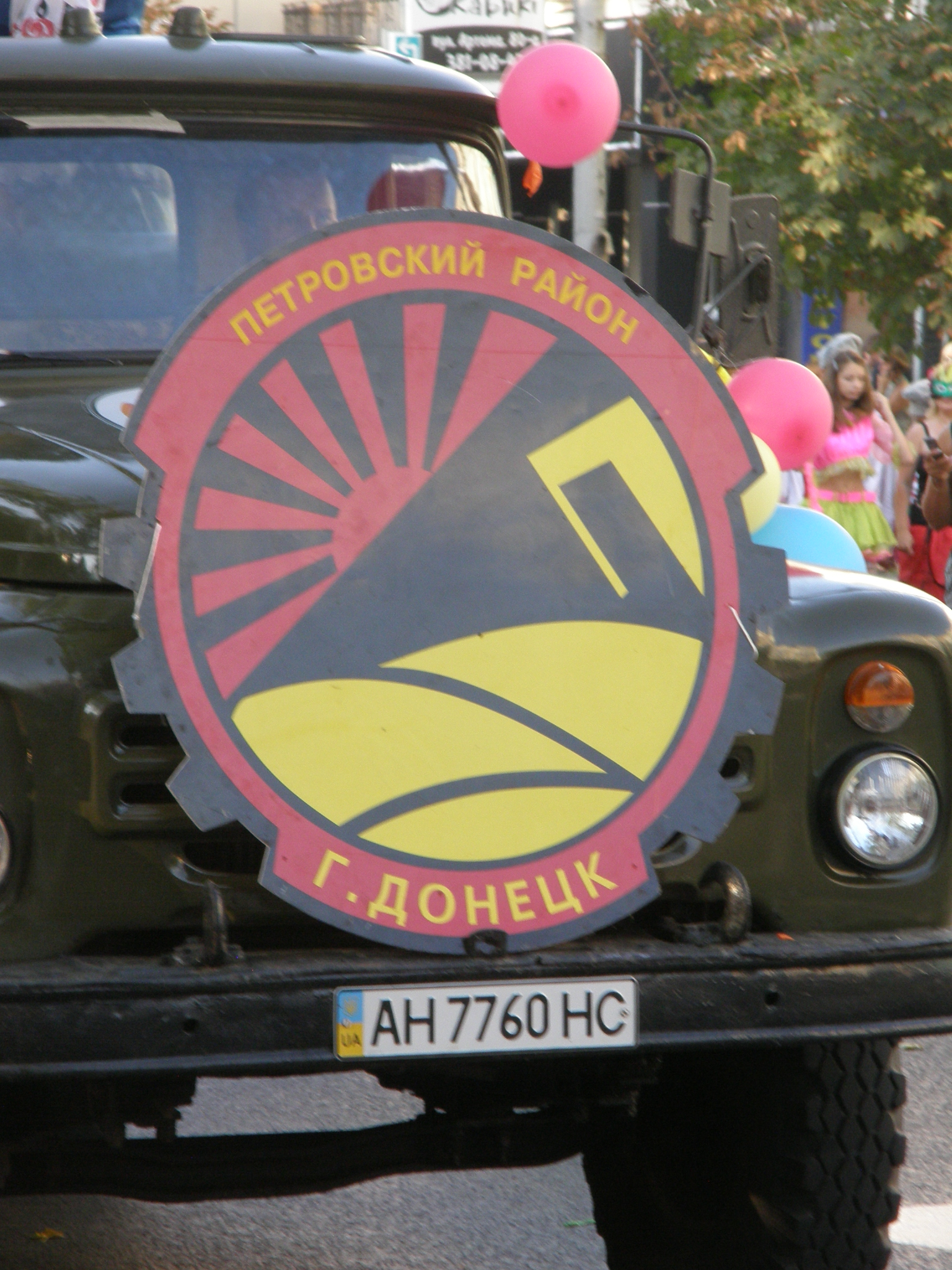
- Coat of arms
- Interactive map of Petrovskyi District
- Country: Ukraine
- Oblast: Donetsk Oblast

Area
  - Total: 62.4 km^{2} (24.1 sq mi)

Population 2001 Ukrainian Census
  - Total: 85,399
- Time zone: UTC+2 (EET)
  - Summer (DST): UTC+3 (EEST)

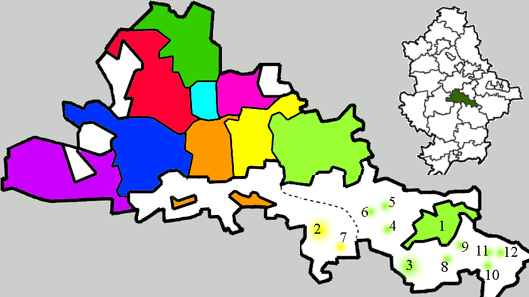
Districts of Donetsk on the territory of the Donetsk City Municipality: Budonivskyi District Voroshylovskyi District Kalininskyi District Kyivskyi District Kirovskyi District / Kuibyshevskyi District Leninskyi District Petrovskyi District Proletarskyi District

Petrovskyi District (Ukrainian: Петровський район) is an urban district of the city of Donetsk, under the control of the de facto Donetsk People's Republic, named after a Soviet political figure Grigoriy Petrovsky. It was created in 1937.

On 22 February 2026, the Donetsk Oblast Military Administration renamed it to Voznesenskyi District (Ukrainian: Вознесенський район) as part of the decommunization and derussification campaign. This name comes from the Voznesenskyi Rudnyk mine, which was later renamed to Petrovskyi Rudnyk. However, this name is only de jure used by the Ukrainian government and the renaming has not de facto taken place while Donetsk is under Russian control.

== Places ==
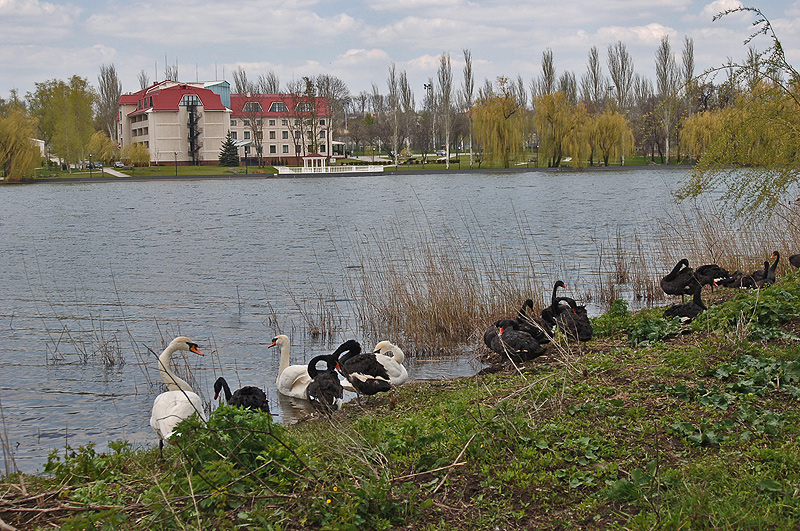
Shakhtar Donetsk training grounds in Kirsha

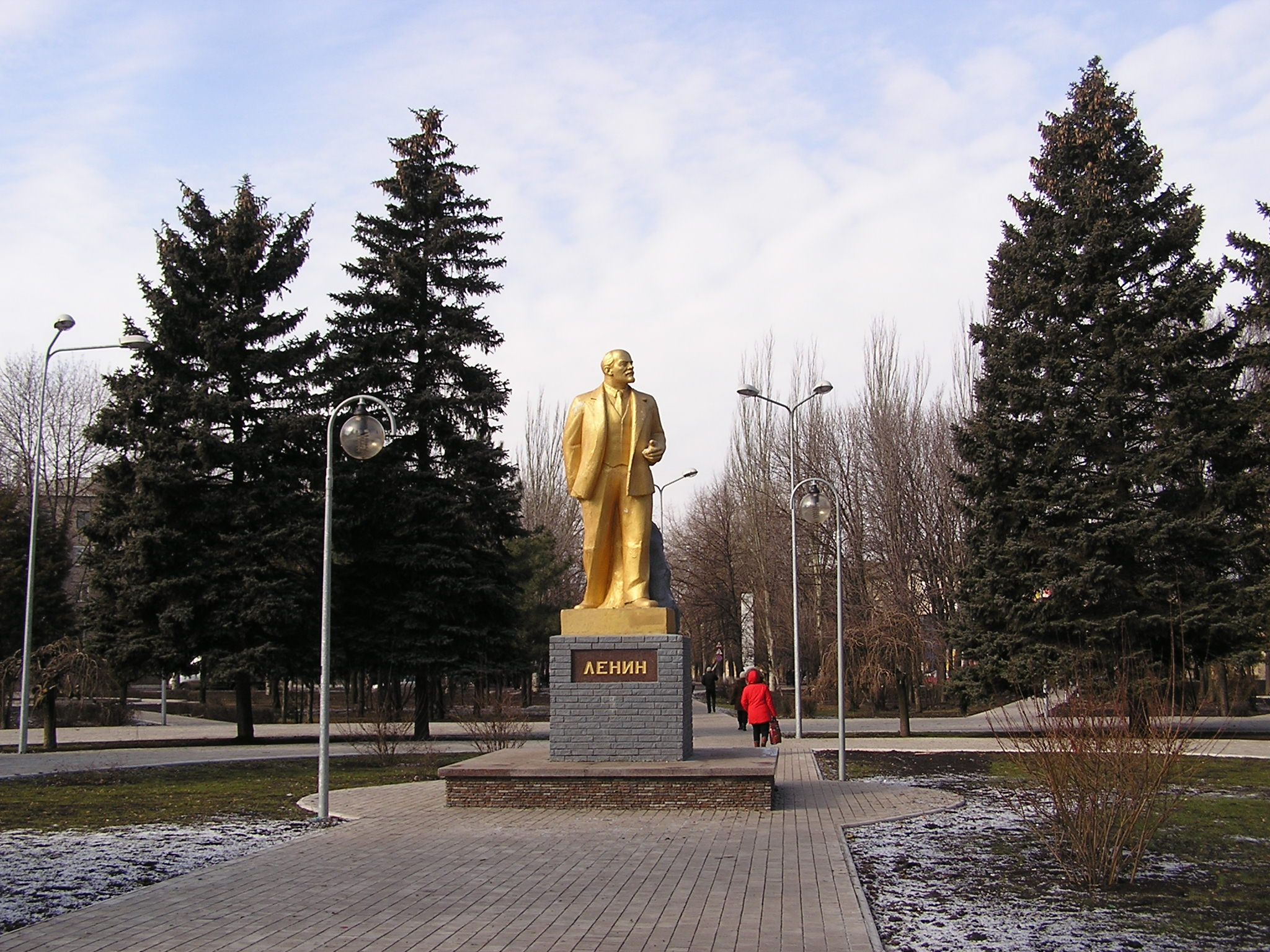
Lenin's monument at the Victory Square, 2009

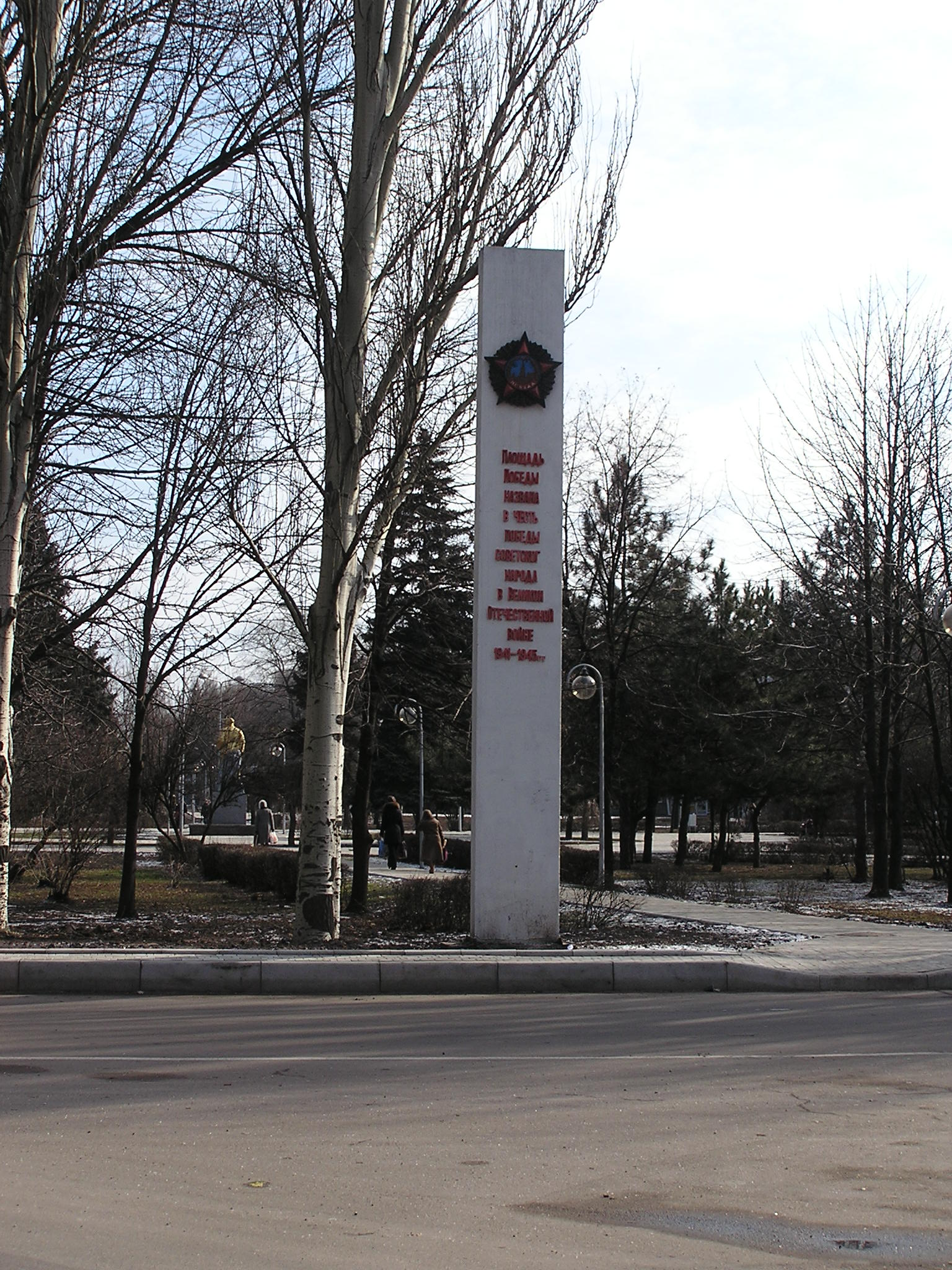
Memorial Stele at the Victory Square, 2009

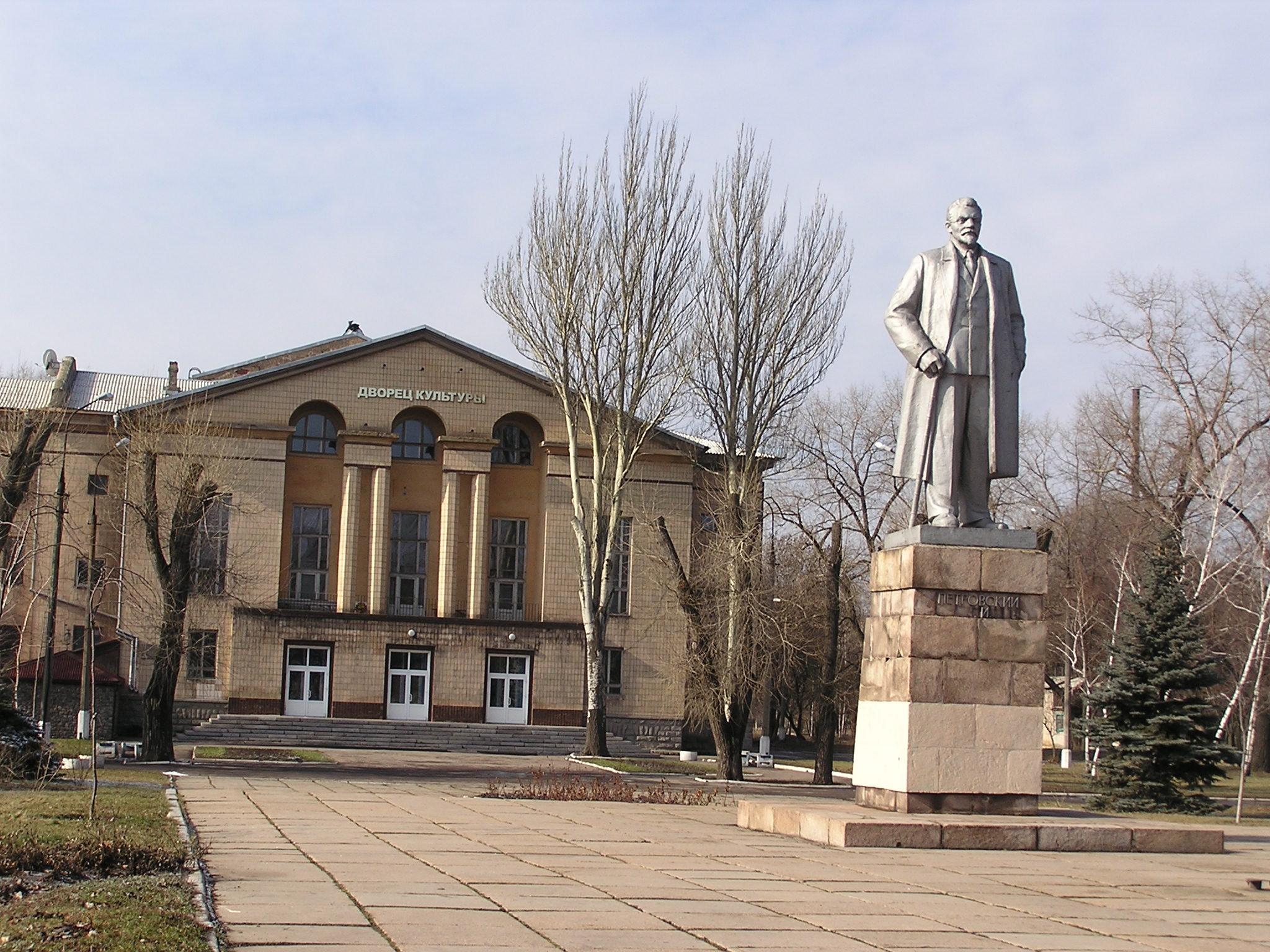
Petrovsky's monument in front of the Palace of Cultures, 2009
