= Kalininskyi District, Donetsk =

Coordinates: 48.008460°N 37.836945°E

Kalininskyi District Калінінський район
- Urban district
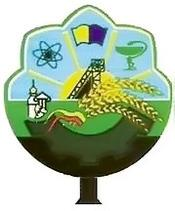
- Flag Coat of arms
- Interactive map of Kalininskyi District
- Country: Ukraine
- Oblast: Donetsk City Municipality

Area
  - Total: 25.90 km^{2} (10.00 sq mi)

Population
  - Total: 107,098
- Time zone: UTC+2 (EET)
  - Summer (DST): UTC+3 (EEST)

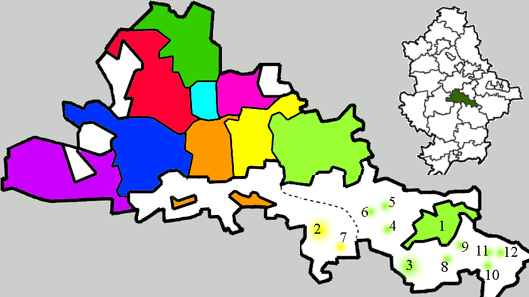
Districts of Donetsk on the territory of the Donetsk City Municipality: Budonivskyi District Voroshylovskyi District Kalininskyi District Kyivskyi District Kirovskyi District / Kuibyshevskyi District Leninskyi District Petrovskyi District Proletarskyi District

Kalininskyi District (Ukrainian: Калінінський район) is an urban district of the city of Donetsk, Ukraine, named after a Soviet political figure Mikhail Kalinin.

On 22 February 2026, the Donetsk Oblast Military Administration renamed it to Kalynivskyi District (Ukrainian: Калинівський район) as part of the decommunization and derussification campaign. This name comes from the Kalynivka neighborhood. However, this name is only de jure used by the Ukrainian government and the renaming has not de facto taken place while Donetsk is under Russian control.

== Places ==
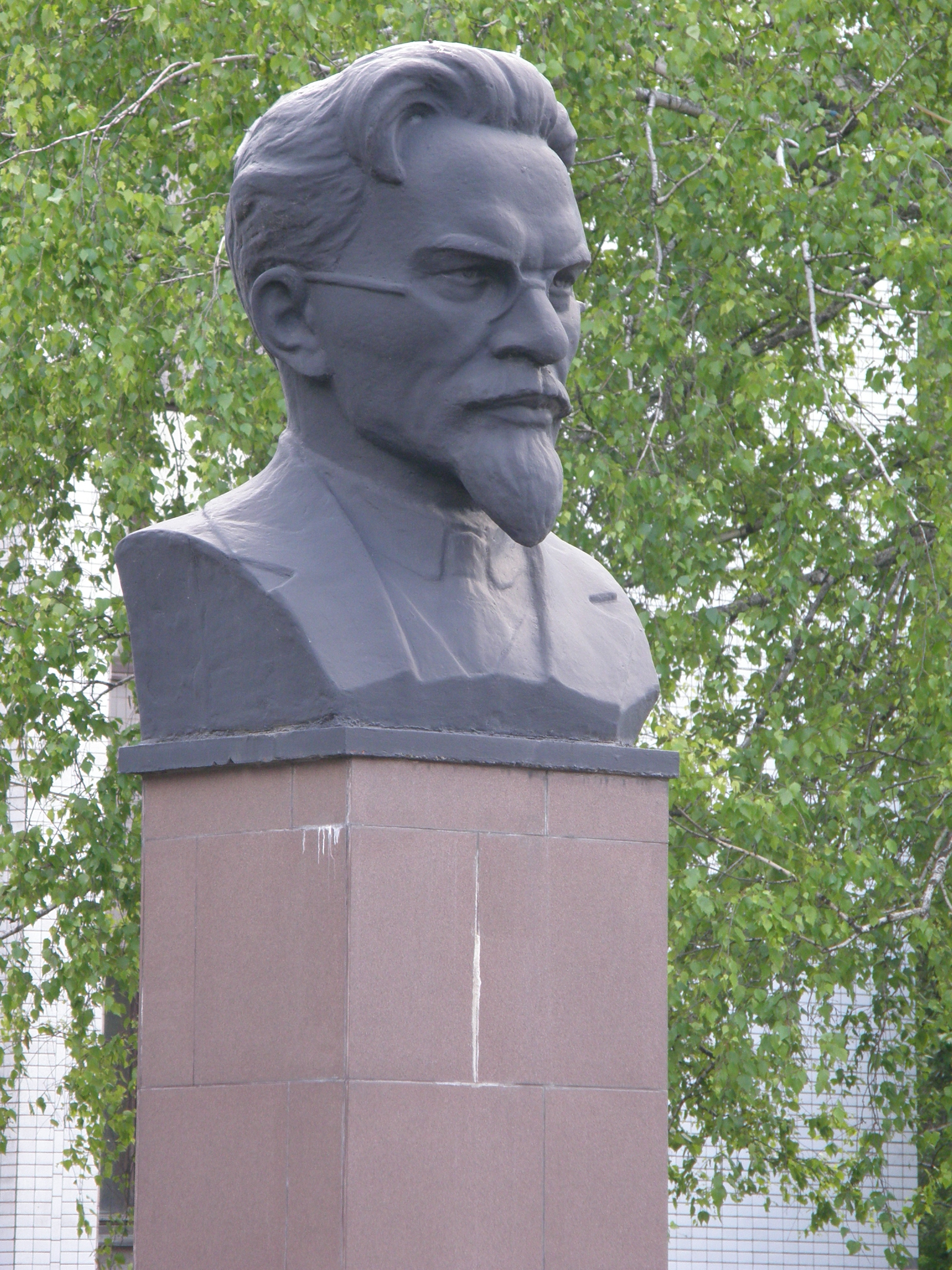
Kalinin bust, 2010

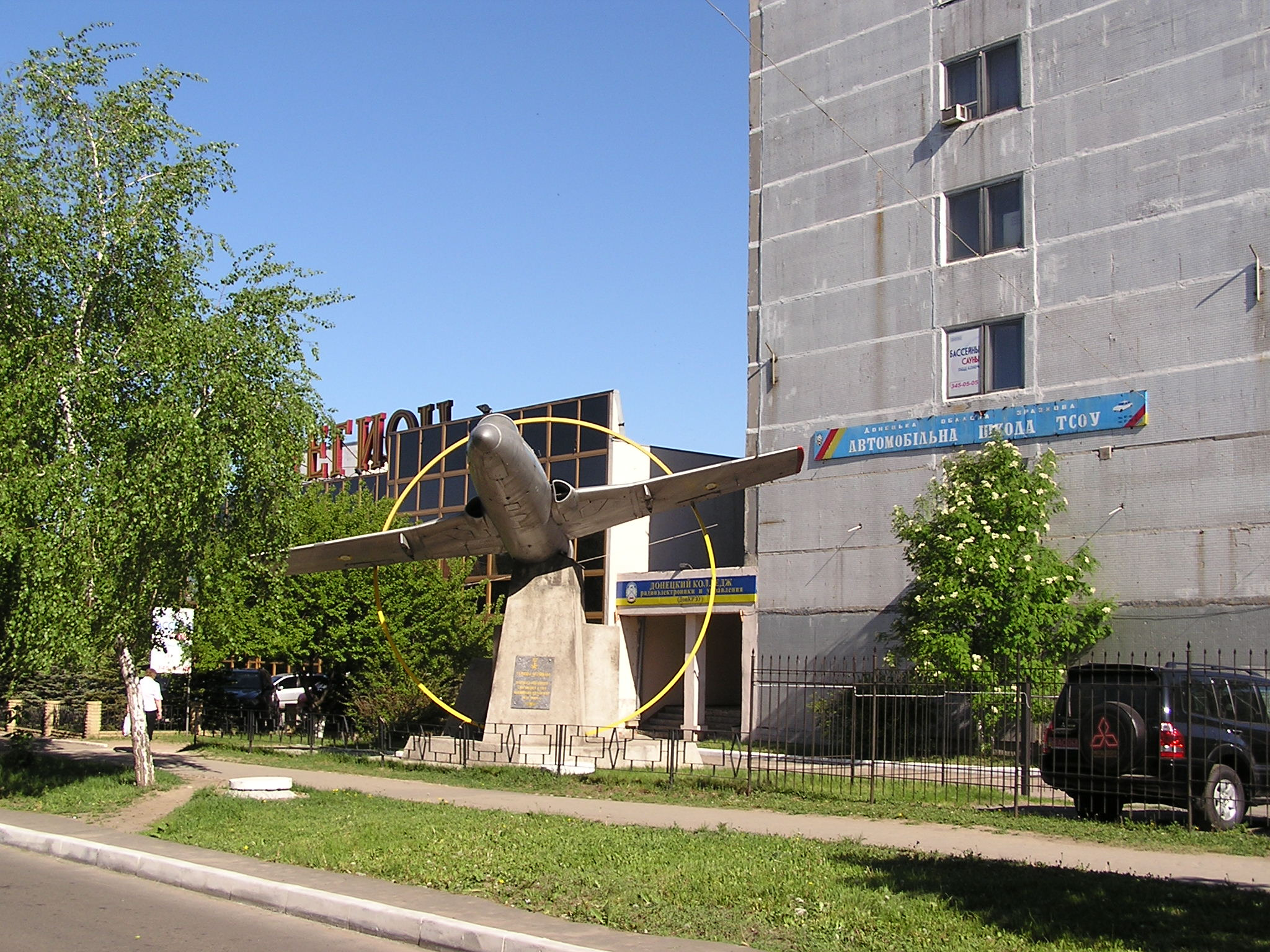
Monument to heroes pilots of the DOSAAF ASC Donetsk

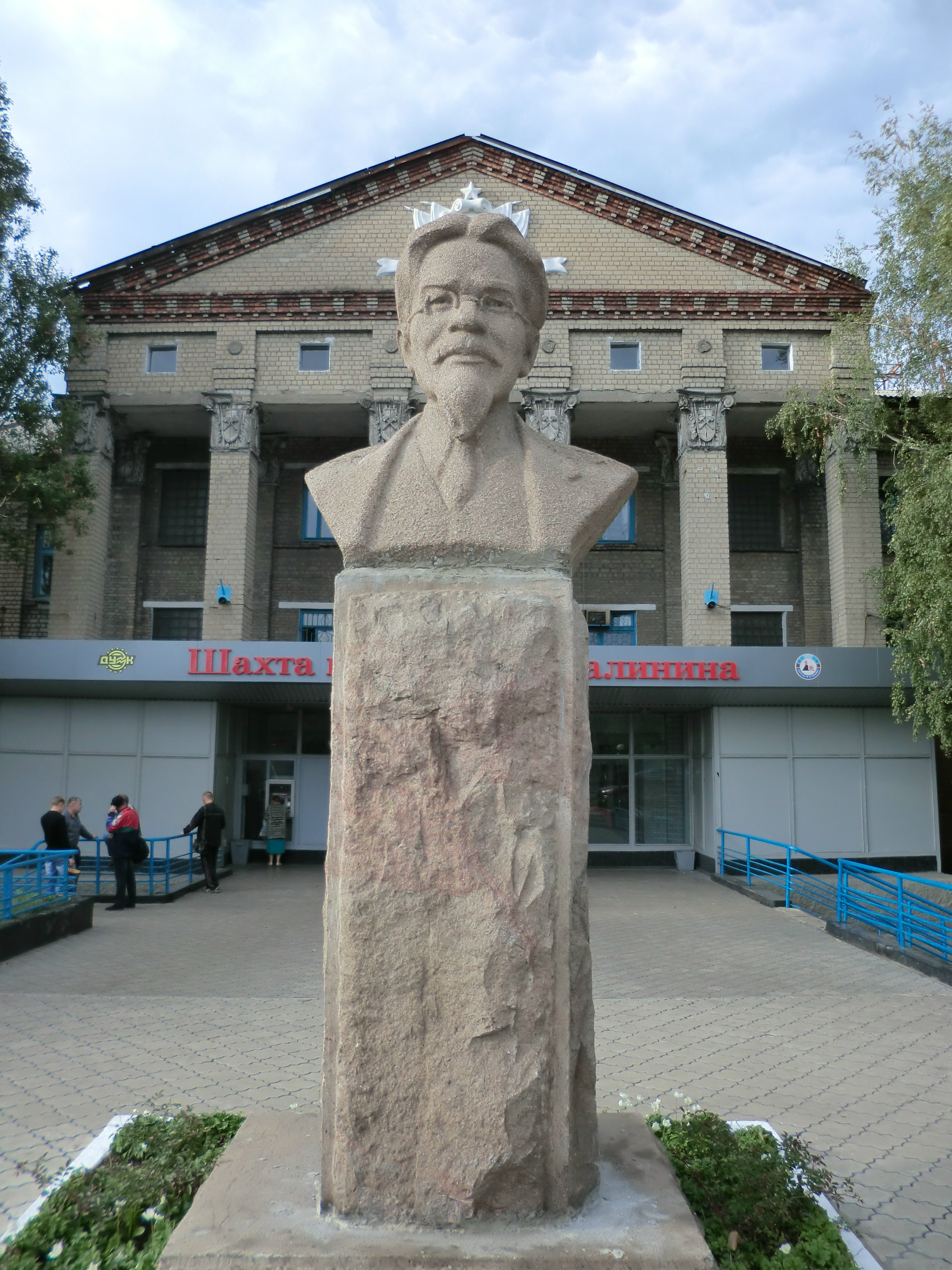
Kalinin bust in front of the Kalinin Mine, 2012

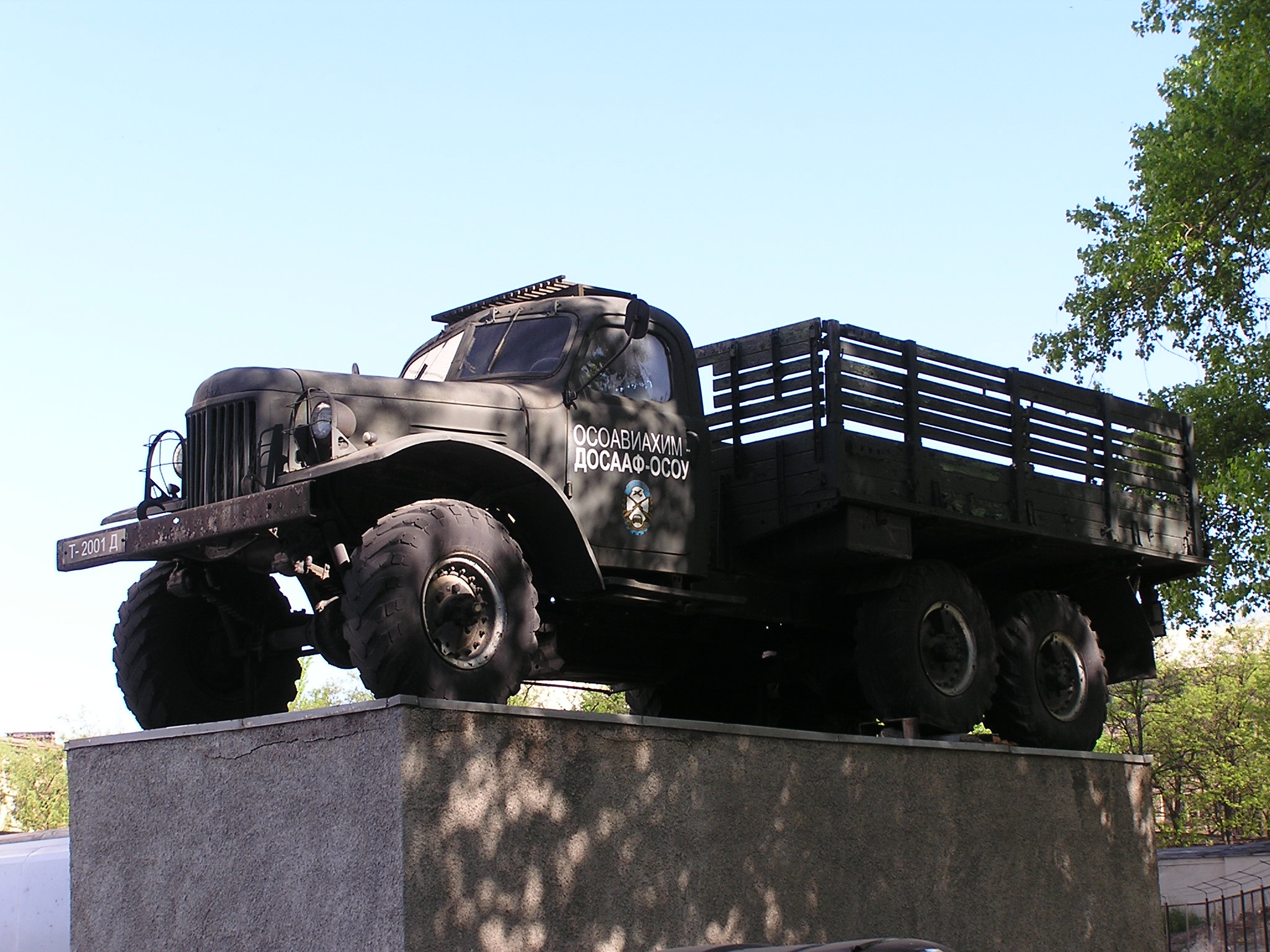
Monument to the DOSAAF drivers

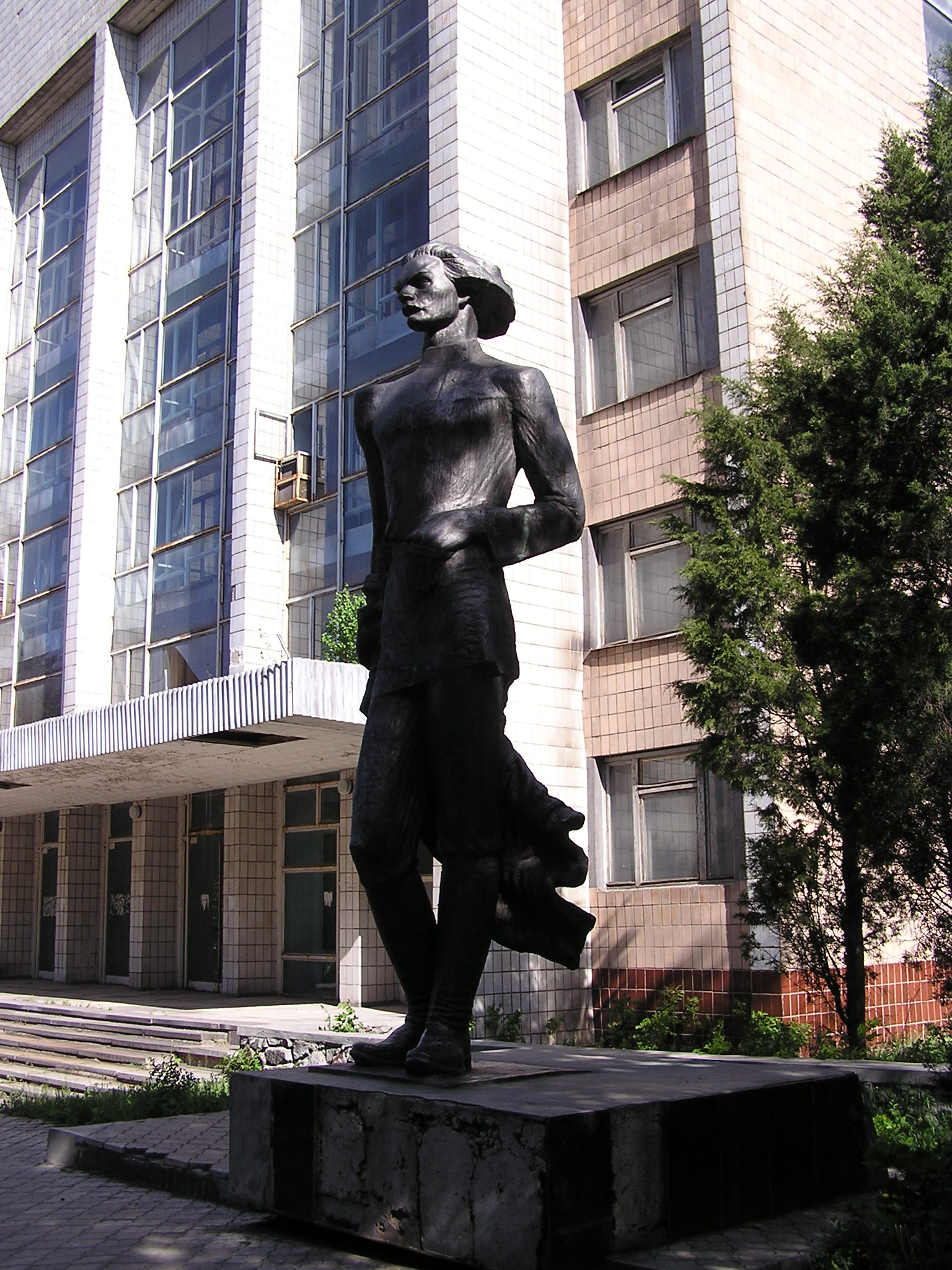
Gorky monument

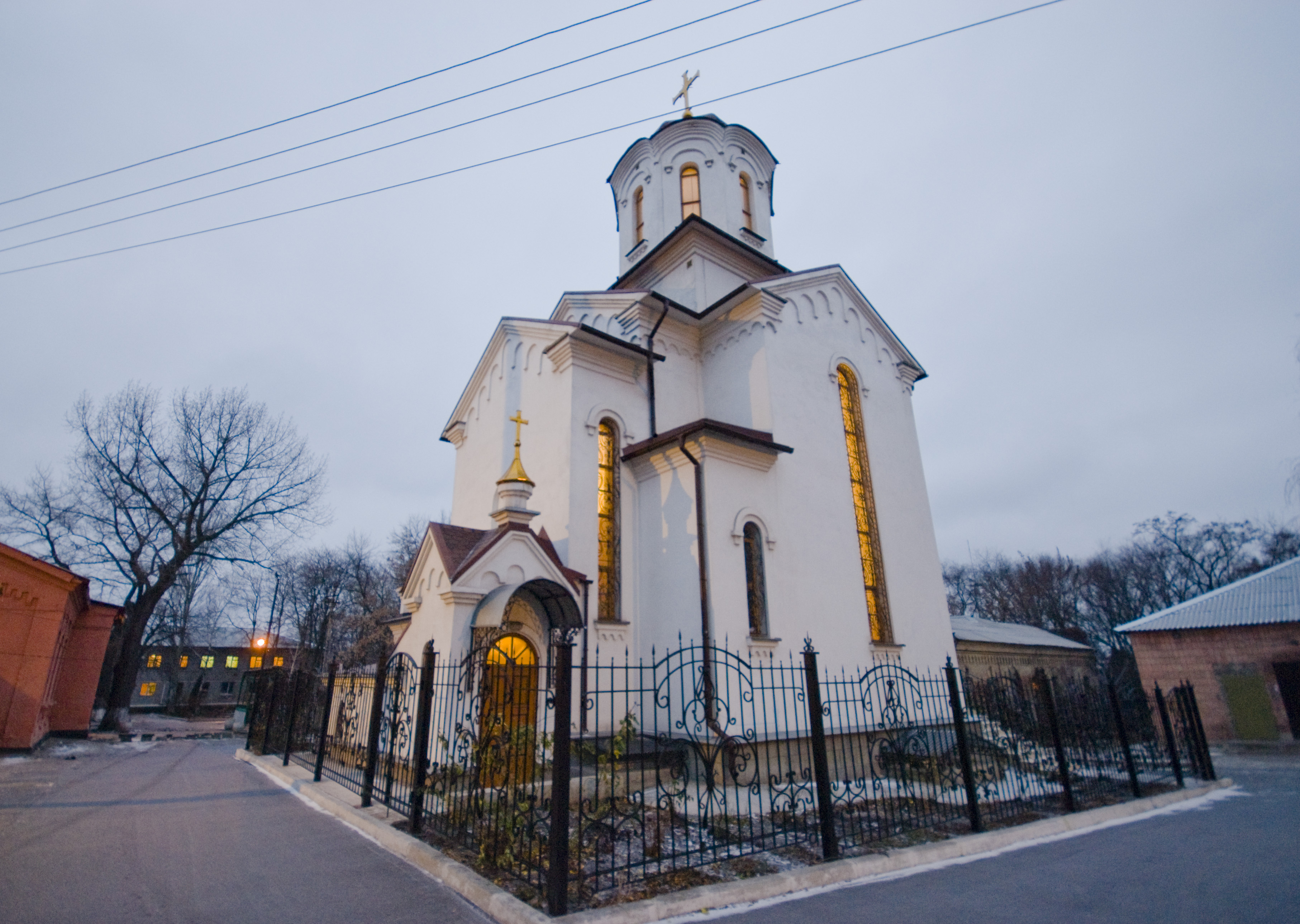
St.Boniface Cathedral, 2008

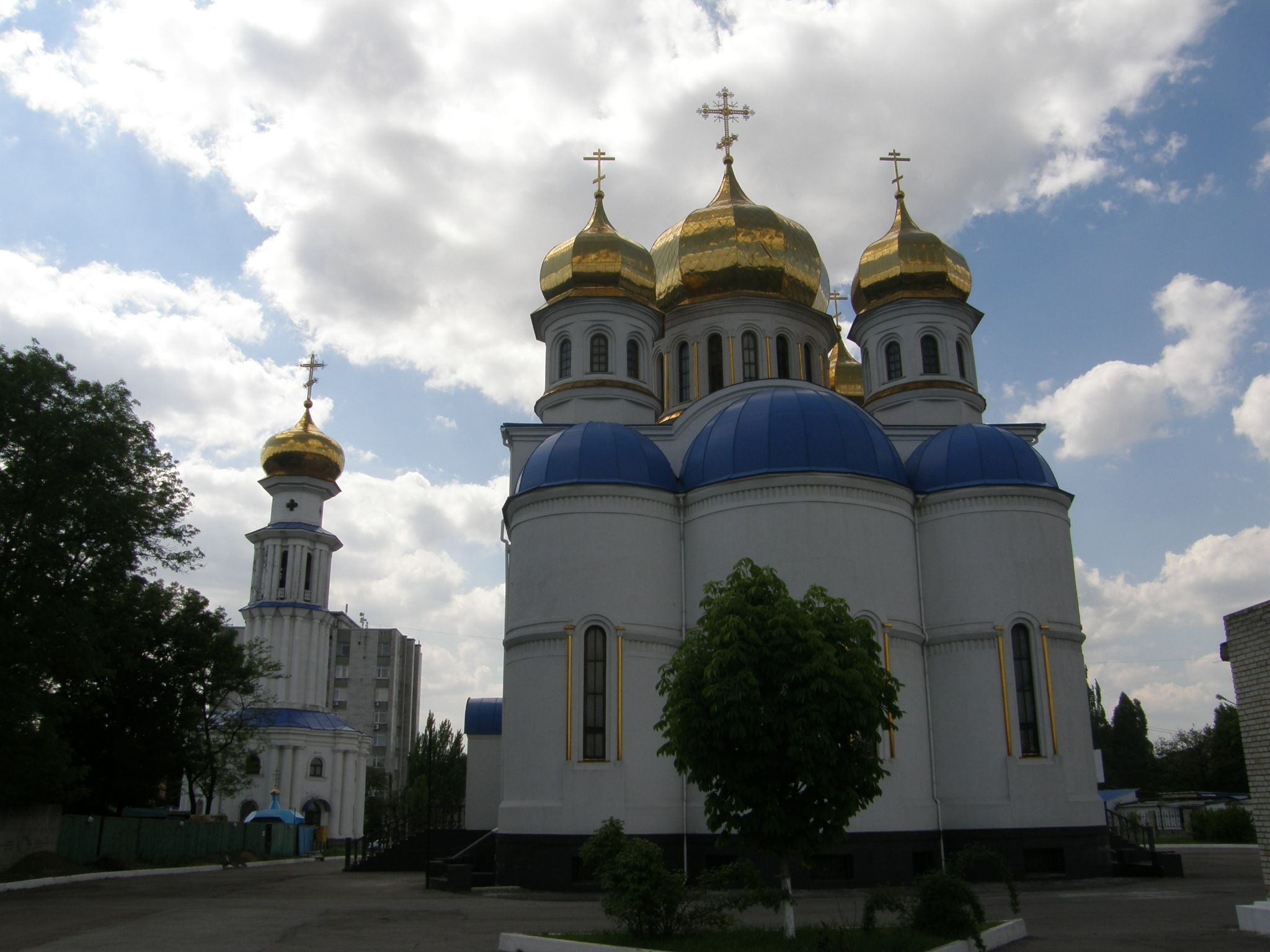
Church of the Protection of the St.Theotokos, 2009

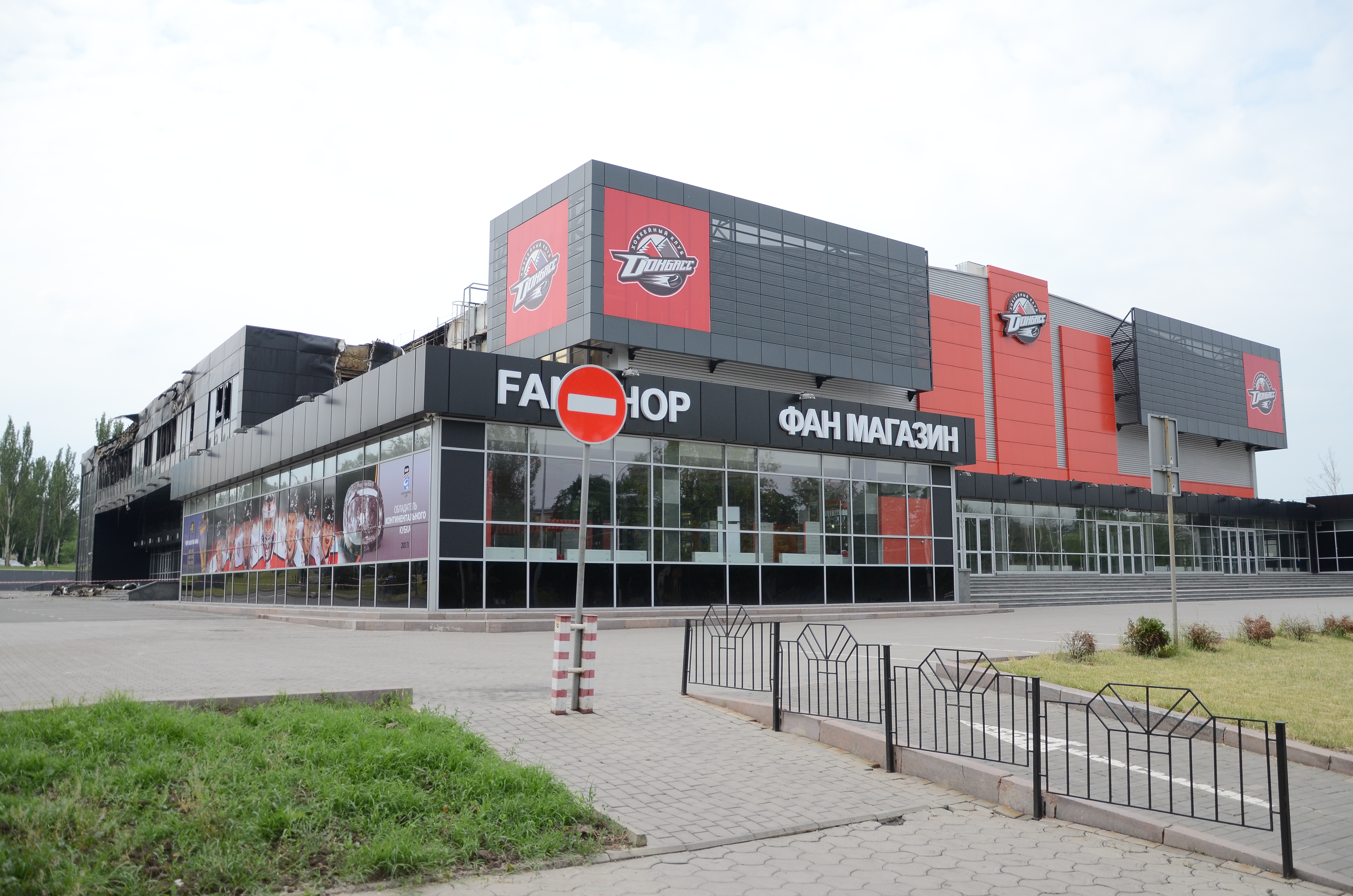
Druzhba Sports Palace after fire in May 2014
