= Donetsk urban hromada =

Donetsk urban hromada Донецька міська громада
- Hromada
- Interactive map of Donetsk urban hromada
- Country: Ukraine
- Oblast: Donetsk Oblast
- Raion: Donetsk Raion
- Settlements: 14
- Cities: 2
- Villages: 8
- Towns: 4

Donetsk urban hromada (Ukrainian: Донецька міська громада) is a hromada of Ukraine, located in Donetsk Raion, Donetsk Oblast. Its administrative center is the city Donetsk.

The hromada contains 14 settlements: 2 cities (Donetsk and Mospyne), 4 rural settlements (Horbachevo-Mykhailivka, Laryne, Oleksandrivka, and Staromykhailivka), and 8 villages:

- Byriuky
- Hryshky
- Kyslyche
- Mykhailivka
- Novodvirske
- Pavlohradske
- Temriuk
- Verbova Balka

== See also ==
- List of hromadas of Ukraine
