= Proletarskyi District, Donetsk =

Coordinates: 47.956125°N 37.923314°E

Proletarskyi District Пролетарський район
- Urban district
- Interactive map of Proletarskyi District
- Country: Ukraine
- Oblast: Donetsk Oblast
- Municipality: Donetsk
- Administrative seat: Mospyne

Area
  - Total: 146.90 km^{2} (56.72 sq mi)

Population
  - Total: 103,005
- Time zone: UTC+2 (EET)
  - Summer (DST): UTC+3 (EEST)

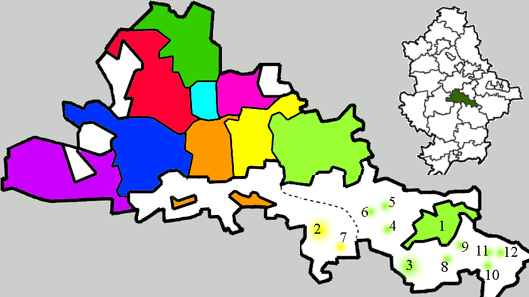
Districts of Donetsk on the territory of the Donetsk City Municipality: Budonivskyi District Voroshylovskyi District Kalininskyi District Kyivskyi District Kirovskyi District / Kuibyshevskyi District Leninskyi District Petrovskyi District Proletarskyi District

Proletarskyi District (Ukrainian: Пролетарський район) is an urban district of the city of Donetsk, Ukraine.

Created in 1937 as Budonivskyi District, it was renamed the Proletarskyi District in 1958. In 1980, some of its territories were transferred to another district named Budonnivskyi. "Proletarskyi" means "proletarian".

On 22 February 2026, the Donetsk Oblast Military Administration renamed it to Chumakivskyi District (Ukrainian: Чумаківський район) as part of the decommunization and derussification campaign. This name comes from the settlement and railway station of Chumakove. However, this name is only de jure used by the Ukrainian government and the renaming has not de facto taken place while Donetsk is under Russian control.
