= Avtozavodskyi District =

City district of Kremenchuk, Ukraine

Avtozavodskyi District Автозаводський район
- Urban district
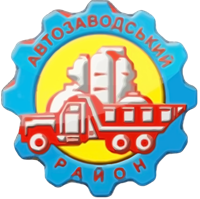
- Coat of arms
- Interactive map of Avtozavodskyi District
- Coordinates: 49°04′18″N 33°24′55″E
- Country: Ukraine
- City: Kremenchuk
- Established: 1975

Area
  - Total: 49.11 km^{2} (18.96 sq mi)

Population
  - Total: 157,382
  - Density: 3,205/km^{2} (8,300/sq mi)
- Time zone: UTC+2 (EET)
  - Summer (DST): UTC+3 (EEST)

The Avtozavodskyi District (Ukrainian: Автозаводський район, romanized: Avtozavodskyi raion) is one of two administrative urban districts (raions) of the city of Kremenchuk, located in central Ukraine.
