= Desnianskyi District, Chernihiv =

Urban district of Chernihiv, Ukraine

Desnianskyi District Деснянський район
- Urban district
- Interactive map of Desnianskyi District
- Coordinates: 51°29′51″N 31°17′33″E
- Country: Ukraine
- City: Chernihiv
- Established: 22 December 1973

Area
  - Total: 4,870.3 km^{2} (1,880.4 sq mi)

Population (2010)
  - Total: 179,600
  - Density: 36.88/km^{2} (95.51/sq mi)
- Time zone: UTC+2 (EET)
  - Summer (DST): UTC+3 (EEST)
- Website: http://desn-rada.gov.ua/

The Desnianskyi District (Ukrainian: Деснянський район, Desnianskyi raion) is one of two administrative urban districts (raions) of the city of Chernihiv, located in northern Ukraine.
