= Leninskyi District, Donetsk =

Coordinates: 47°58′N 37°48′E

Leninskyi District Ленінський район
- Urban district
- Interactive map of Leninskyi District
- Country: Ukraine
- Oblast: Donetsk Oblast

Area
  - Total: 85.8 km^{2} (33.1 sq mi)

Population 2001 Ukrainian Census
  - Total: 106,269
- Time zone: UTC+2 (EET)
  - Summer (DST): UTC+3 (EEST)

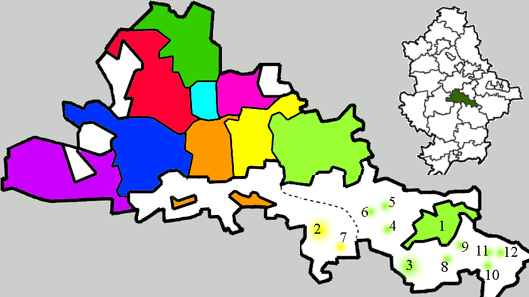
Districts of Donetsk on the territory of the Donetsk City Municipality: Budonivskyi District Voroshylovskyi District Kalininskyi District Kyivskyi District Kirovskyi District / Kuibyshevskyi District Leninskyi District Petrovskyi District Proletarskyi District

Leninskyi District (Ukrainian: Ленінський район) is an urban district of Donetsk, Ukraine, named after a Soviet political figure Vladimir Lenin.

It was created in 1937 as the Stalino-Zavodskyi District.

On 22 February 2026, the Donetsk Oblast Military Administration renamed it to Oleksandrivskyi District (Ukrainian: Олександрівський район) as part of the decommunization and derussification campaign. This name comes from Oleksandrivka, the first settlement on the territory of Donetsk. However, this name is only de jure used by the Ukrainian government and the renaming has not de facto taken place while Donetsk is under Russian control.

== Places ==
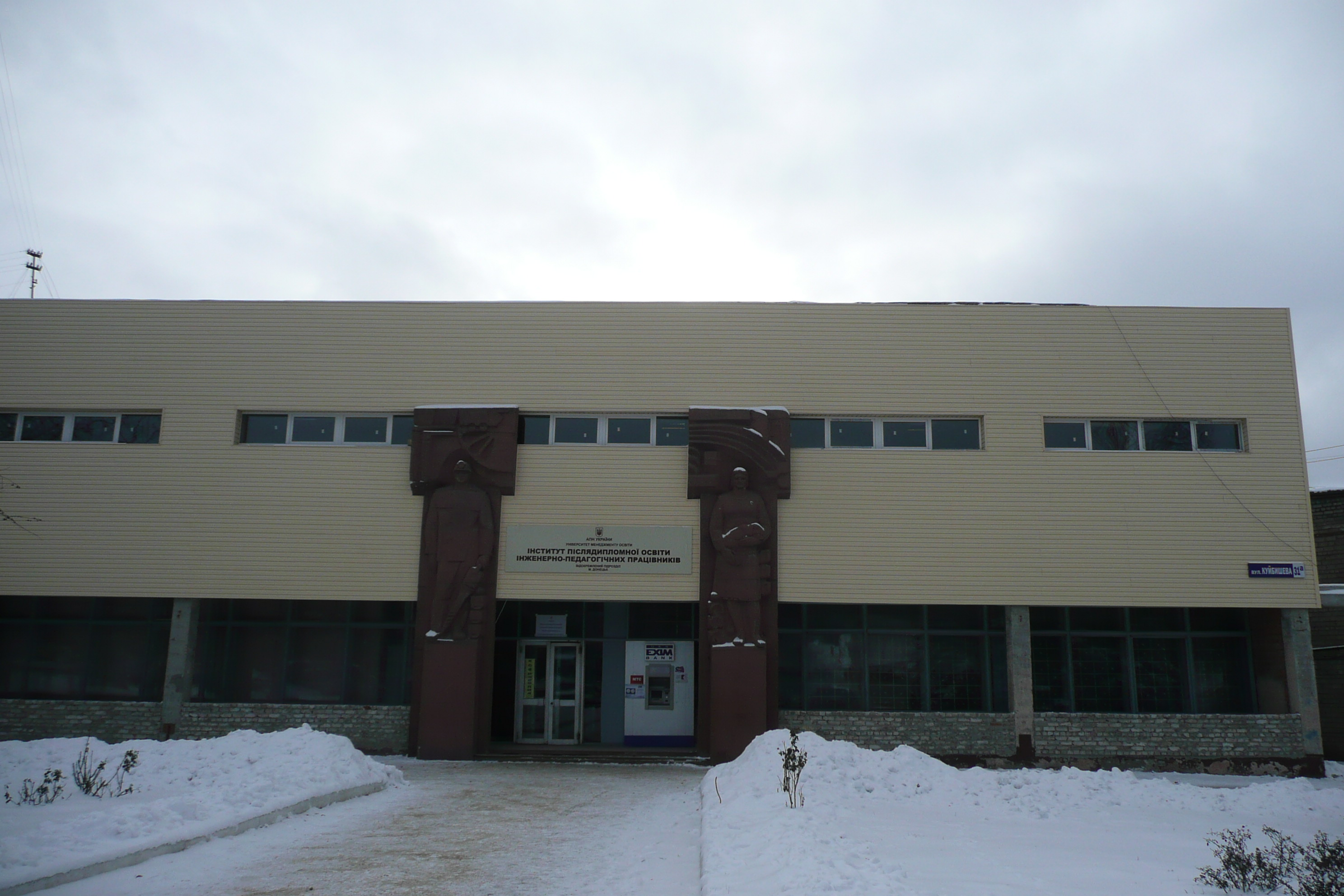
Institute of post-graduate education, 2010

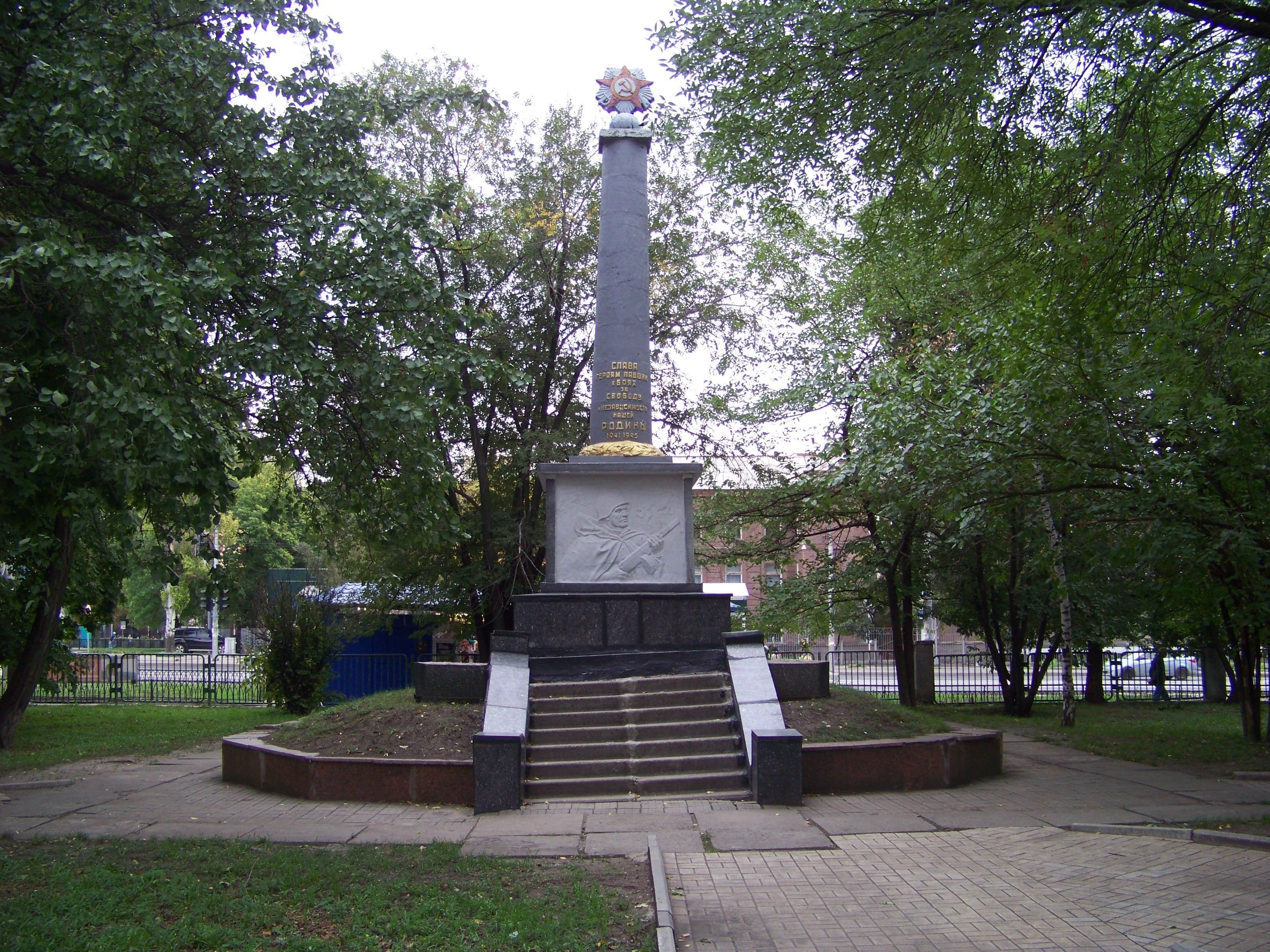
Memorial stele at a mass grave of the World War II Soviet soldiers

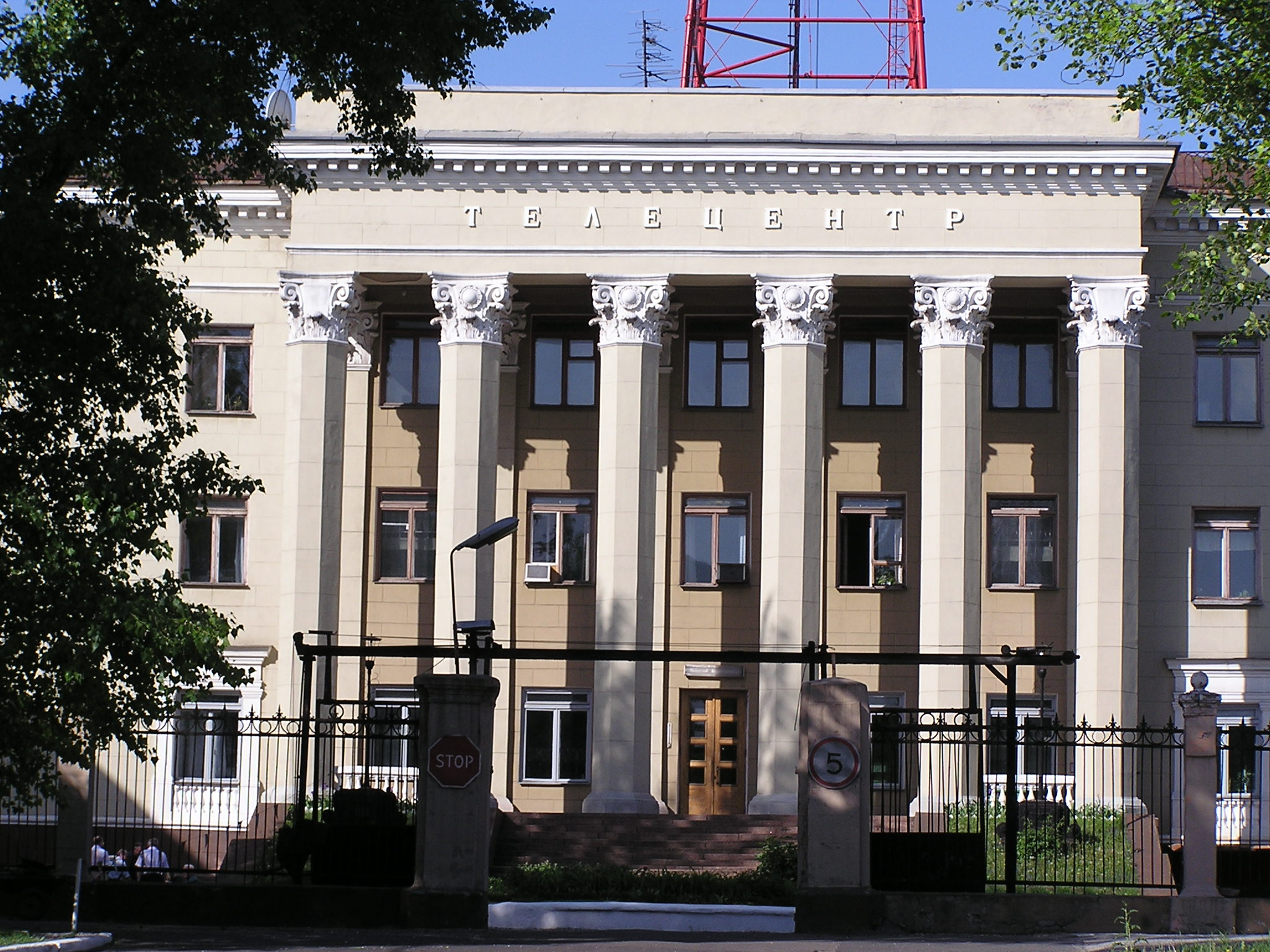
TV Center

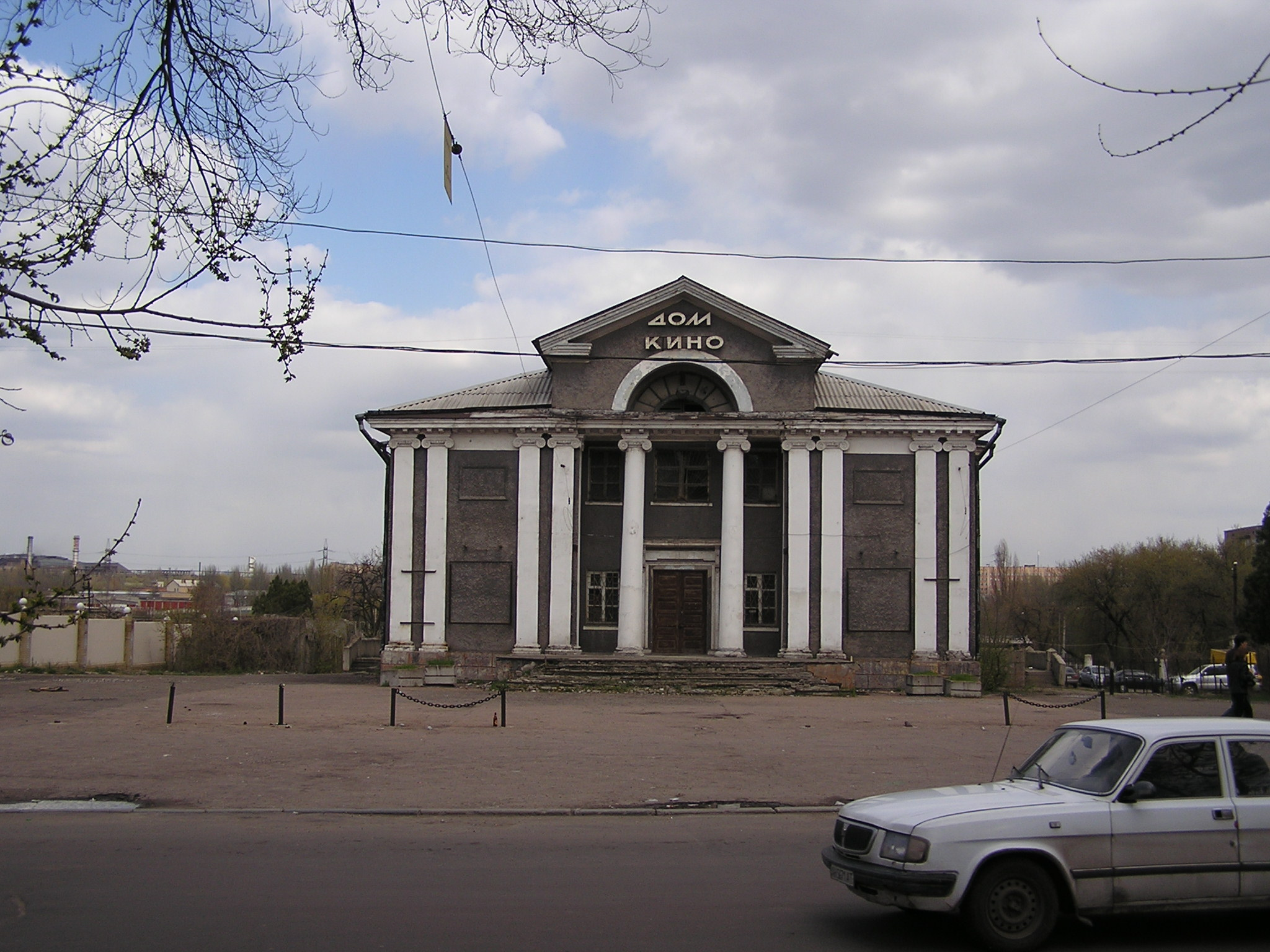
House of Cinema

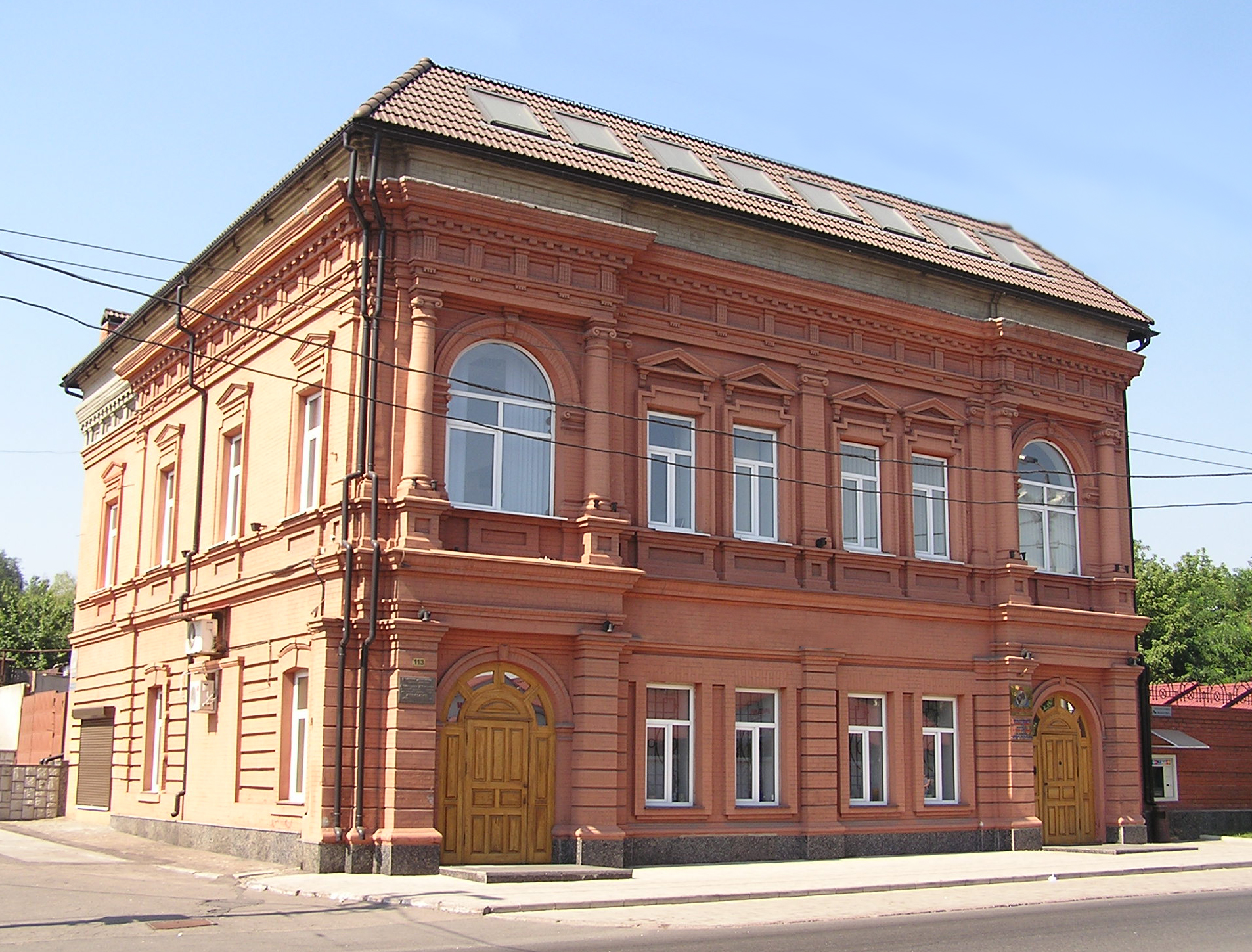
School for children of the British administration of the Yuzivka Metallurgical Factory, 2006

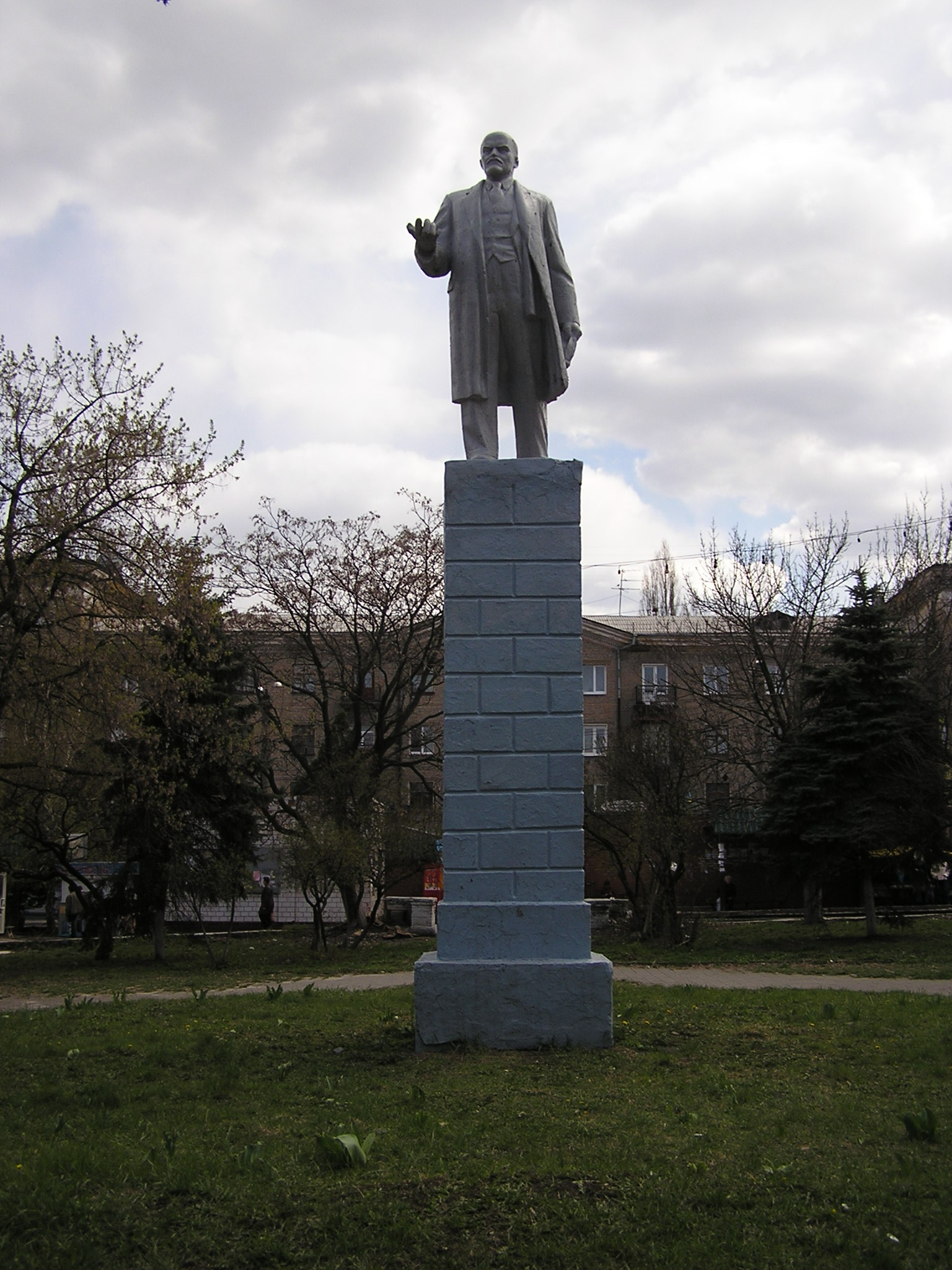
Lenin's monument

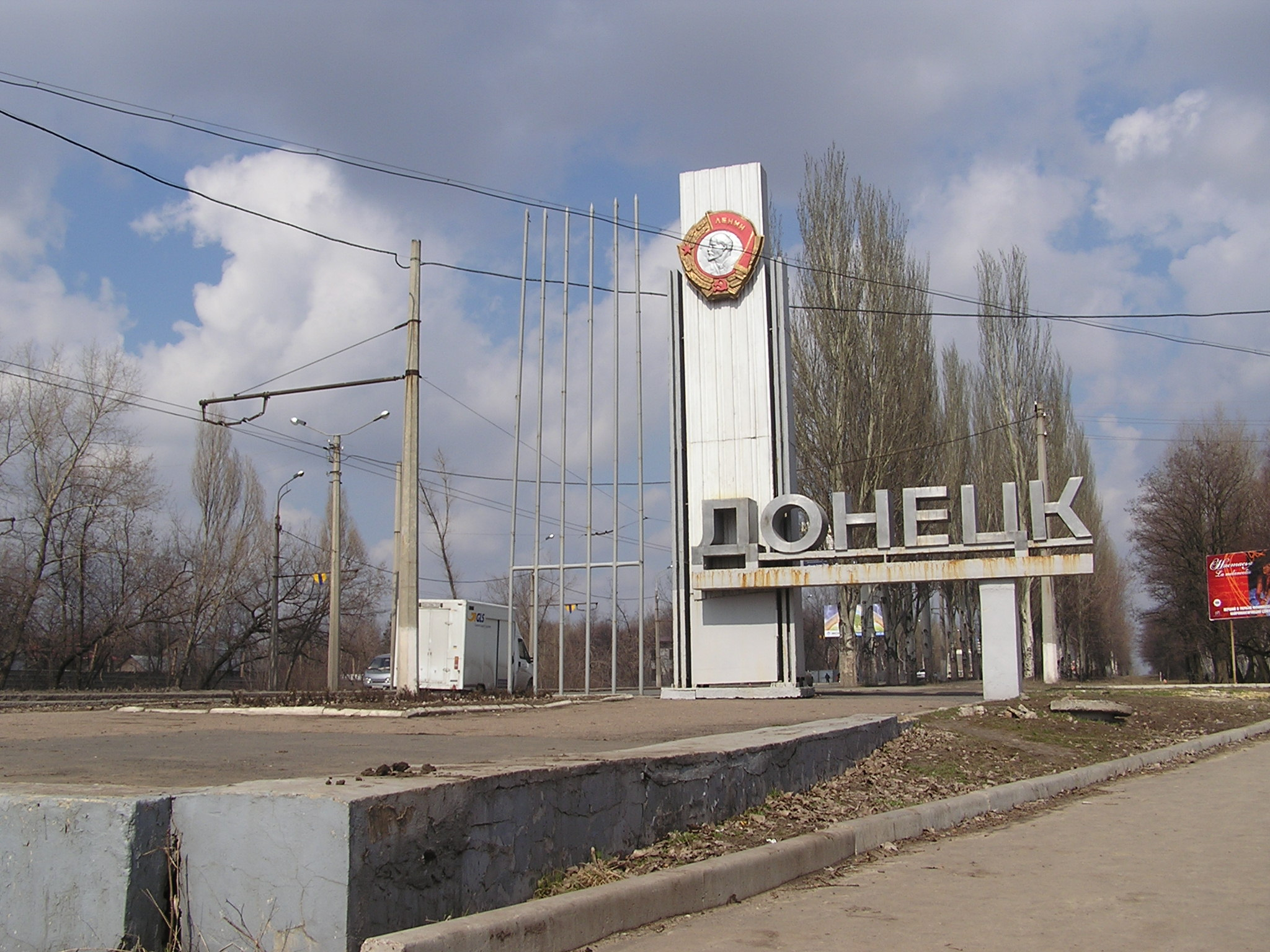
Order of Lenin for Donetsk
