= Sosnivskyi District =

City district of Cherkasy, Ukraine

Sosnivskyi District Соснівський район
- Urban district
- Interactive map of Sosnivskyi District
- Coordinates: 49°26′12″N 32°01′44″E
- Country: Ukraine
- Municipality: Cherkasy Municipality
- Established: 22 December 1973

Area
  - Total: 43,135 km^{2} (16,655 sq mi)

Population (2001)
  - Total: 149,732
  - Density: 3.4712/km^{2} (8.9905/sq mi)
- Time zone: UTC+2 (EET)
  - Summer (DST): UTC+3 (EEST)

The Sosnivskyi District (Ukrainian: Соснівський район, Sosnivsʹkyi raion) is one of two administrative urban districts (raions) of the city of Cherkasy, located in southern Ukraine.

== Population ==
According to the 2001 Ukrainian Census, the population of the district was 149,732.

=== Language ===
Distribution of the population by native language according to the 2001 census:

| Language | Number | Percentage |
|---|---|---|
| Ukrainian | 118 935 | 79.44% |
| Russian | 27 557 | 18.40% |
| Other^{[a]} | 3 240 | 2.16% |
| Total | 149 732 | 100.00% |

^{a} Those who did not indicate their native language or indicated a language that was native to less than 1% of the local population.
