= Prymorskyi District, Mariupol =

Prymorskyi District Приморський район
- Urban district
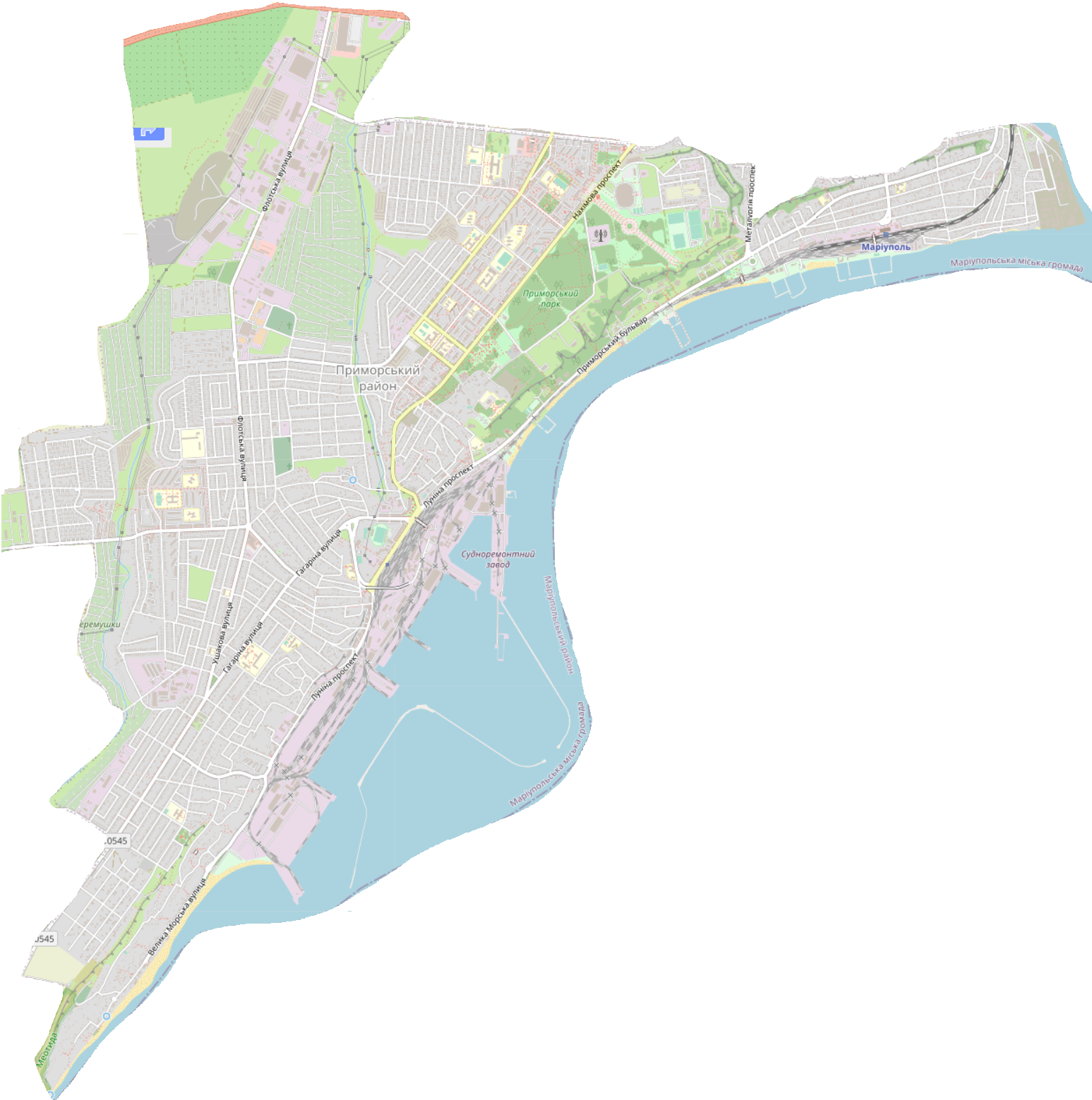
- Interactive map of Prymorskyi District
- Country: Ukraine
- Oblast: Donetsk Oblast

Area
  - Total: 23.014 km^{2} (8.886 sq mi)

Population
  - Total: 64,200
- Time zone: UTC+2 (EET)
  - Summer (DST): UTC+3 (EEST)

Prymorskyi District (Ukrainian: Приморський район) is an urban district of the city of Mariupol, Ukraine.

The district was established in 1938.

== Demographics ==
According to the 2001 census, the population of the district was 71,008 people, of whom 13.52% had Ukrainian as their mother tongue, 85.79% - Russian, 0.19% - Greek, 0.12% - Armenian, 0.09% - Belarusian, 0.06% - Romani, 0.03% - Moldovan (Romanian), 0.01% - Bulgarian, Jewish, Polish, German and Hungarian, as well as Gagauz and Slovak languages.
