= Prydniprovskyi District, Cherkasy =

City district of Cherkasy, Ukraine

Prydniprovskyi District Придніпровський район
- Urban district
- Interactive map of Prydniprovskyi District
- Coordinates: 49°24′11″N 32°05′02″E
- Country: Ukraine
- Municipality: Cherkasy Municipality
- Established: 22 December 1973

Area
  - Total: 25,865 km^{2} (9,987 sq mi)

Population (2001)
  - Total: 143,100
  - Density: 5.533/km^{2} (14.33/sq mi)
- Time zone: UTC+2 (EET)
  - Summer (DST): UTC+3 (EEST)

The Prydniprovskyi District (Ukrainian: Придніпровський район, Prydniprovsʹkyi raion) is one of two administrative urban districts (raions) of the city of Cherkasy, located in southern Ukraine.

== Population ==
According to the 2001 Ukrainian Census, the population of the district was 143,029.

=== Language ===
Distribution of the population by native language according to the 2001 census:

Language	Number	Percentage
Ukrainian	112 506	78.66%
Russian	27 120	18.96%
Other^{[a]}	3 403	2.38%
Total	143 029	100.00%

^{a} Those who did not indicate their native language or indicated a language that was native to less than 1% of the local population.
