= Prydniprovske, Zaporizhzhia Oblast =

Prydniprovske Придніпровське
- Village
- Location of Prydniprovske in Zaporizhzhia Oblast Prydniprovske (Zaporizhzhia Oblast)
- Coordinates: 47°57′36″N 35°05′19″E
- Country: Ukraine
- Oblast: Zaporizhzhia Oblast
- District: Zaporizhzhia Raion
- Founded: 1943

Area
  - Total: 2.5 km^{2} (0.97 sq mi)
- Elevation: 67 m (220 ft)

Population (2001)
  - Total: 79
  - Density: 32/km^{2} (82/sq mi)
- Time zone: UTC+2 (EET)
  - Summer (DST): UTC+3 (EEST)
- Postal code: 70410
- Area code: +380 612
- Website: http://rada.gov.ua/

Prydniprovske (Ukrainian: Придніпровське) is a village (a selo) in the Zaporizhzhia Raion (district) of Zaporizhzhia Oblast on the Dnipro right bank in southern Ukraine. Its population was 79 in the 2001 Ukrainian Census. Administratively, it belongs to the Lukasheve Rural Council, a local government area.

The settlement was founded in 1943 as Pryvolne (Ukrainian: Привольне); in 1950, it was renamed to Prydniprovske.

== See also ==
- Prydniprovske
