= Urban districts of Ukraine =

- Category: Fourth-level subdivision
- Location: Ukraine
- Created: 1918 (in Kyiv)
- Number: 108 (as of 2020)
- Government: District council
- Subdivisions: Local government

An urban district or urban raion (Ukrainian: район в місті, romanized: raion v misti) is the quaternary administrative division in certain cities in Ukraine. There are 118 districts in 20 cities across Ukraine. The cities that contain districts are mostly administrative centers in addition to the two cities with special status (Kyiv and Sevastopol). The number of city districts per region varies between a minimum of two and a high of 21 in Donetsk Oblast. The maximum districts for a single city in the country is Kyiv, which has 10 districts. Cities which have abolished their urban districts (Chernivtsi and Vinnytsia) are marked with an asterisk (*) and in italics below.

Article 133 of the Constitution of Ukraine lists city districts as an element of the administrative-territorial division of the state, while Article 140 states that issues in the organization and management of city districts belongs to the competence of city councils. City districts are subordinate to a city's administration. The status of Kyiv city is defined by the law Про столицю України - місто-герой Київ (transl. About the capital of Ukraine - the hero city Kyiv). Since 18 March 2014, due to the Russian annexation of Crimea, the urban districts of Sevastopol and Simferopol have been controlled by Russia.

During the Donbas war, a number of urban districts located in cities in southeastern Donetsk Oblast and southern Luhansk Oblast were occupied by pro-Russian separatist forces. As of 30 September 2022, Russia officially claims the formerly-separatist controlled urban districts in Donetsk and Luhansk oblasts as part of its administrative divisions in addition to urban districts located in other cities occupied by Russia since the start of its full-scale invasion of Ukraine on 24 February 2022. Before February 2016, many districts were named for people, places, events, and organizations associated with the Soviet Union and Russian Empire; many were renamed since to comply with decommunization and derussification laws.

== List of urban districts ==
Urban districts in Ukraine
City	District name	Name (in Ukrainian) (Note: Links to Ukrainian Wikipedia articles for each city.)	Population (2001 census)
Kyiv	Darnytskyi	Дарницький	282,359
Kyiv	Desnianskyi	Деснянський	336,209
Kyiv	Dniprovskyi	Дніпровський	331,618
Kyiv	Holosiivskyi	Голосіївський	202,993
Kyiv	Obolonskyi	Оболонський	306,173
Kyiv	Pecherskyi	Печерський	131,127
Kyiv	Podilskyi	Подільський	180,424
Kyiv	Shevchenkivskyi	Шевченківський	237,213
Kyiv	Solomianskyi	Солом'янський	287,801
Kyiv	Sviatoshynskyi	Святошинський	315,410
Sevastopol	Balaklavskyi	Балаклавський	25,719
Sevastopol	Haharinskyi	Гагарінський	120,842
Sevastopol	Leninskyi	Ленінський	110,949
Sevastopol	Nakhimovskyi	Нахімовський	121,982
Simferopol	Zaliznychnyi	Залізничний	82,905
Simferopol	Kyivskyi	Київський	153,998
Simferopol	Tsentralnyi	Центральний	106,741
Cherkasy	Prydniprovskyi	Придніпровський	143,124
Cherkasy	Sosnivskyi	Соснівський	152,290
Chernihiv	Desnianskyi	Деснянський	184,616
Chernihiv	Novozavodskyi	Новозаводський	120,378
Chernivtsi* (until 2016) (Note: Urban districts in Chernivtsi were abolished on 1 January 2016.)	Pershotravnevyi	Першотравневий	71,432
Chernivtsi* (until 2016)	Sadhirskyi	Садгірський	28,397
Chernivtsi* (until 2016)	Shevchenkivskyi	Шевченківський	140,792
Dnipro	Chechelivskyi	Чечелівський	123,022
Dnipro	Industrialnyi	Індустріальний	134,924
Dnipro	Novokodatskyi	Новокодацький	162,451
Dnipro	Amur-Nyzhnodniprovskyi	Амур-Нижньодніпровський	160,572
Dnipro	Samarskyi	Самарський	80,157
Dnipro	Shevchenkivskyi	Шевченківський	159,867
Dnipro	Sobornyi	Соборний	172,002
Dnipro	Tsentralnyi	Центральний	72,013
Kamianske	Dniprovskyi	Дніпровський	90,233
Kamianske	Pivdennyi	Південний	75,158
Kamianske	Zavodskyi	Заводський	90,450
Kryvyi Rih	Dovhyntsivskyi	Довгинцівський	102,217
Kryvyi Rih	Inhuletskyi	Інгулецький	23,447
Kryvyi Rih	Metalurhiinyi	Металургійний	70,705
Kryvyi Rih	Pokrovskyi	Покровський	142,955
Kryvyi Rih	Saksahanskyi	Саксаганський	149,181
Kryvyi Rih	Ternivskyi	Тернівський	89,600
Kryvyi Rih	Tsentralno-Miskyi	Центрально-Міський	90,875
Donetsk	Bohodukhivskyi (Note: De jure renamed in 2026 by Ukraine as part of the decommunization and derussification campaign. As the Ukrainian government does not control Donetsk, the Russian authorities continue using its old name Budonnivskyi District.)	Богодухівський	94,875
Donetsk	Chumakivskyi (Note: De jure renamed in 2026 by Ukraine as part of the decommunization and derussification campaign. As the Ukrainian government does not control Donetsk, the Russian authorities continue using its old name Proletarskyi District.)	Чумаківський	103,005
Donetsk	Kalynivskyi (Note: De jure renamed in 2026 by Ukraine as part of the decommunization and derussification campaign. As the Ukrainian government does not control Donetsk, the Russian authorities continue using its old name Kalininskyi District.)	Калинівський	107,098
Donetsk	Kyivskyi	Київський	139,177
Donetsk	Oleksandrivskyi (Note: De jure renamed in 2026 by Ukraine as part of the decommunization and derussification campaign. As the Ukrainian government does not control Donetsk, the Russian authorities continue using its old name Leninskyi District.)	Олександрівський	106,269
Donetsk	Rutchenkivskyi (Note: De jure renamed in 2026 by Ukraine as part of the decommunization and derussification campaign. As the Ukrainian government does not control Donetsk, the Russian authorities continue using its old name Kirovskyi District.)	Рутченківський	168,046
Donetsk	Smolianskyi (Note: De jure renamed in 2026 by Ukraine as part of the decommunization and derussification campaign. As the Ukrainian government does not control Donetsk, the Russian authorities continue using its old name Kuibyshevskyi District.)	Смолянський	118,157
Donetsk	Voznesenskyi (Note: De jure renamed in 2026 by Ukraine as part of the decommunization and derussification campaign. As the Ukrainian government does not control Donetsk, the Russian authorities continue using its old name Petrovskyi District.)	Вознесенський	85,399
Donetsk	Yuzivskyi (Note: De jure renamed in 2026 by Ukraine as part of the decommunization and derussification campaign. As the Ukrainian government does not control Donetsk, the Russian authorities continue using its old name Voroshylovskyi District.)	Юзівський	94,168
Horlivka	Kindrativskyi (Note: De jure renamed in 2026 by Ukraine as part of the decommunization and derussification campaign. As the Ukrainian government does not control Horlivka, the Russian authorities continue using its old name Kalininskyi District.)	Кіндратівський	101,565
Horlivka	Mykytivskyi	Микитівський	70,336
Horlivka	Tsentralno-Miskyi	Центрально-Міський	120,349
Makiivka	Berestovskyi (Note: De jure renamed in 2026 by Ukraine as part of the decommunization and derussification campaign. As the Ukrainian government does not control Makiivka, the Russian authorities continue using its old name Chervonohvardiiskyi District.)	Берестовський	81,042
Makiivka	Hirnytskyi	Гірницький	107,825
Makiivka	Hruzkyi (Note: De jure renamed in 2026 by Ukraine as part of the decommunization and derussification campaign. As the Ukrainian government does not control Makiivka, the Russian authorities continue using its old name Kirovskyi District.)	Грузький	52,768
Makiivka	Khanzhonkivskyi (Note: De jure renamed in 2026 by Ukraine as part of the decommunization and derussification campaign. As the Ukrainian government does not control Makiivka, the Russian authorities continue using its old name Sovietskyi District.)	Ханжонківський	53,007
Makiivka	Tsentralno-Miskyi	Центрально-Міський	94,937
Mariupol	Kalmiuskyi	Кальміуський	103,721
Mariupol	Livoberezhnyi	Лівобережний	128,139
Mariupol	Prymorskyi	Приморський	71,991
Mariupol	Tsentralnyi	Центральний	188,325
Kharkiv	Industrialnyi	Індустріальний	155,843
Kharkiv	Kholodnohirskyi	Холодногірський	93,844
Kharkiv	Kyivskyi	Київський	188,706
Kharkiv	Nemyshlianskyi	Немишлянський	144,151
Kharkiv	Novobavarskyi	Новобаварський	111,173
Kharkiv	Osnovianskyi	Основ'янський	96,529
Kharkiv	Saltivskyi	Салтівський	310,278
Kharkiv	Shevchenkivskyi	Шевченківський	220,580
Kharkiv	Slobidskyi	Слобідський	149,798
Kherson	Dniprovskyi	Дніпровський	81,074
Kherson	Korabelnyi	Корабельний	118,467
Kherson	Tsentralnyi	Центральний	128,819
Kropyvnytskyi	Fortechnyi	Фортечний	167,451
Kropyvnytskyi	Podilskyi	Подільський	86,652
Luhansk	Kamianobridskyi	Кам'янобрідський	45,339
Luhansk	Shevchenkivskyi (Note: De jure renamed in 2026 by Ukraine as part of the decommunization and derussification campaign. As the Ukrainian government does not control Luhansk, the Russian authorities continue using its old name Leninskyi District.)	Шевченківський	89,432
Luhansk	Verhunskyi (Note: De jure renamed in 2026 by Ukraine as part of the decommunization and derussification campaign. As the Ukrainian government does not control Luhansk, the Russian authorities continue using its old name Zhovtnevyi District.)	Вергунський	196,943
Luhansk	Vilkhivskyi (Note: De jure renamed in 2026 by Ukraine as part of the decommunization and derussification campaign. As the Ukrainian government does not control Luhansk, the Russian authorities continue using its old name Artemivskyi District.)	Вільхівський	131,383
Lviv	Frankivskyi	Франківський	139,122
Lviv	Halytskyi	Галицький	69,621
Lviv	Lychakivskyi	Личаківський	96,982
Lviv	Shevchenkivskyi	Шевченківський	147,200
Lviv	Sykhivskyi	Сихівський	146,847
Lviv	Zaliznychnyi	Залізничний	133,024
Mykolaiv	Inhulskyi	Інгульський	144,127
Mykolaiv	Korabelnyi	Корабельний	83,457
Mykolaiv	Tsentralnyi	Центральний	154,211
Mykolaiv	Zavodskyi	Заводський	132,341
Odesa	Khadzhybeiskyi	Хаджибейський	242,900
Odesa	Kyivskyi	Київський	256,580
Odesa	Peresypskyi	Пересипський	263,000
Odesa	Prymorskyi	Приморський	259,000
Kremenchuk	Avtozavodskyi	Автозаводський	158,455
Kremenchuk	Kriukivskyi	Крюківський	75,618
Poltava	Kyivskyi	Київський	113,603
Poltava	Podilskyi	Подільський	56,570
Poltava	Shevchenkivskyi	Шевченківський	147,825
Sumy (Note: The administrations of the urban districts in Sumy were abolished in 2006 but the districts still de jure exist, though there are plans to fully abolish them in the future.)	Kovpakivskyi	Ковпаківський	142,447
Sumy	Zarichnyi	Зарічний	150,694
Vinnytsia* (until 2012) (Note: Urban districts in Vinnytsia were abolished on 14 February 2012.)	Leninskyi	Ленінський	180,770
Vinnytsia* (until 2012)	Staromiskyi	Староміський	59,574
Vinnytsia* (until 2012)	Zamostianskyi	Замостянський	114,295
Zaporizhzhia	Dniprovskyi	Дніпровський	151,857
Zaporizhzhia	Kosmichnyi	Космічний	140,395
Zaporizhzhia	Khortytskyi	Хортицький	122,443
Zaporizhzhia	Oleksandrivskyi	Олександрівський	76,251
Zaporizhzhia	Shevchenkivskyi	Шевченківський	157,077
Zaporizhzhia	Voznesenivskyi	Вознесенівський	106,288
Zaporizhzhia	Zavodskyi	Заводський	60,945
Zhytomyr	Bohunskyi	Богунський	156,255
Zhytomyr	Korolovskyi	Корольовський	127,981

== See also ==
- ISO 3166-2:UA
- List of places named after people (Ukraine)
- Populated places in Ukraine
- Urbanization
