= Tsentralnyi District, Mariupol =

Tsentralnyi District Центральний район
- Urban district
- Interactive map of Tsentralnyi District
- Country: Ukraine
- Oblast: Donetsk Oblast

Area
  - Total: 46.599 km^{2} (17.992 sq mi)

Population
  - Total: 179,582
- Time zone: UTC+2 (EET)
  - Summer (DST): UTC+3 (EEST)

Tsentralnyi District (Ukrainian: Центральний район) is an urban district of the city of Mariupol, Ukraine.

The district was established in 1939.

== Demographics ==
According to the 2001 census, the population of the district was 187,362 people, of whom 8.34% had Ukrainian as their mother tongue, 91.12% - Russian, 0.12% - Greek, 0.08% - Armenian, 0.05% - Belarusian, 0.01% - Romani, Moldovan (Romanian), Bulgarian, Jewish and Polish, as well as German, Gagauz and Romanian (self-declared).
