= Laryne, Donetsk Oblast =

Urban locality in Donetsk Oblast, Ukraine

Laryne Ларине
- Rural settlement
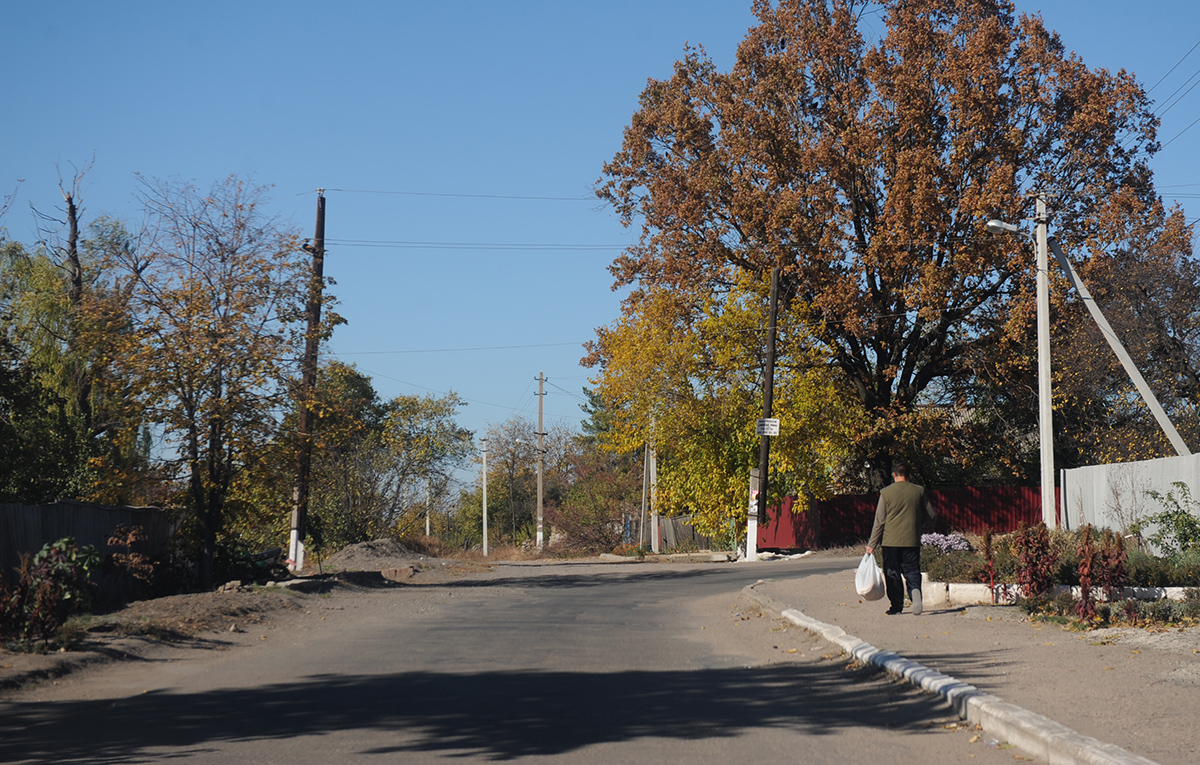

- Location of Laryne in Donetsk Oblast Laryne (Donetsk Oblast)
- Coordinates: 47°52′58″N 37°55′46″E
- Country: Ukraine
- Oblast: Donetsk Oblast
- Raion: Donetsk Raion
- Hromada: Donetsk urban hromada

Area
  - Total: 4.37 km^{2} (1.69 sq mi)
- Elevation: 115 m (377 ft)

Population (2022)
  - Total: 2,761
  - Density: 632/km^{2} (1,640/sq mi)
- Time zone: UTC+2
  - Summer (DST): UTC+3
- Postal code: 83491
- Area code: +380 62

Laryne (Ukrainian: Ларине; Russian: Ларино, romanized: Larino) is a rural settlement in Donetsk urban hromada, Donetsk Raion, Donetsk Oblast in Ukraine. From 2014, it was under the control of the self-declared Donetsk People's Republic until it was annexed by Russia in 2022. Population: 2,761 (2022 estimate).
