= Horbachevo-Mykhailivka =

Urban locality in Donetsk Oblast, Ukraine

Horbachevo-Mykhailivka Горбачево-Михайлівка
- Rural settlement
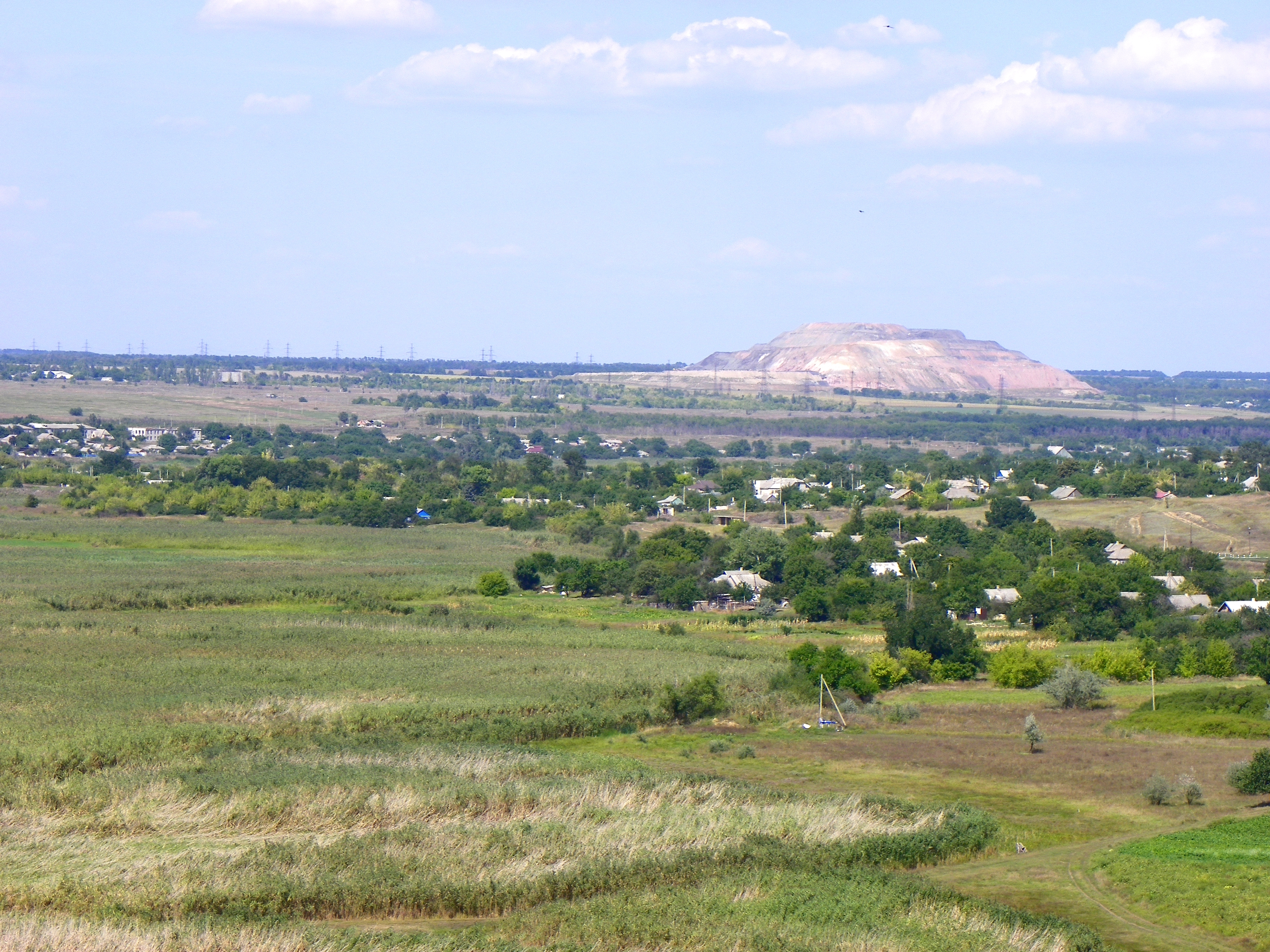

- Location of Horbachevo-Mykhailivka in Donetsk Oblast Horbachevo-Mykhailivka (Donetsk Oblast)
- Coordinates: 47°51′02″N 38°00′42″E
- Country: Ukraine
- Oblast: Donetsk Oblast
- Raion: Donetsk Raion
- Hromada: Donetsk urban hromada

Area
  - Total: 0.77 km^{2} (0.30 sq mi)
- Elevation: 100 m (330 ft)

Population (2022)
  - Total: 917
  - Density: 1,200/km^{2} (3,100/sq mi)
- Time zone: UTC+2
  - Summer (DST): UTC+3
- Postal code: 83499
- Area code: +380 62

Horbachevo-Mykhailivka (Ukrainian: Горбачево-Михайлівка) is a rural settlement in Donetsk urban hromada, Donetsk Raion, Donetsk Oblast, Ukraine. Since 2014, it has been under the control of the self-declared Donetsk People's Republic. Population: 917 (2022 estimate).
