= Serhiy Matiyenkov =

Ukrainian politician (born 1957)

- Сергій Матвієнков
- A picture of him from 2013.

People's Deputy of Ukraine
- In office 27 November 2014 – 29 August 2019
- Constituency: Donetsk Oblast, No. 57
- In office 12 December 2012 – 27 November 2014
- Constituency: Donetsk Oblast, No. 57
- In office 25 May 2006 – 23 November 2007
- Constituency: Socialist Party of Ukraine, No. 25 (party list)
- In office 14 May 2002 – 25 May 2006
- Constituency: Donetsk Oblast, No. 55
- In office 12 May 1998 – 14 May 2002
- Constituency: Donetsk Oblast, No. 55

Personal details
- Born: Serhiy Anatolyevich Matiyenkov; 16 November 1957 (age 68) Zhdanov, Ukrainian SSR, Soviet Union (now Mariupol, Ukraine)
- Party: People's Democratic Party (1998-1999); Party of Regions (1999-2002, 2003-2005,2012-2014); For United Ukraine! (2002); Independent (2002); European Choice (2002-2003); Socialist Party of Ukraine (2005-2007); Opposition Bloc (2014-2019)
- Other political affiliations: Communist Party of the Soviet Union
- Education: Pryazovskyi State Technical University (1980)

Serhiy Anatolyevich Matiyenkov (Ukrainian: Сергій Анатолійович Матвієнков; born 16 December 1957) is a Ukrainian politician who served as a People's Deputy of Ukraine in the Verkhovna Rada continuously from 1998 to 2007 and again from 2012 to 2019.

== Early life ==
Matiyenkov was born on 16 December 1957 in the city of what was then Zhdanov (now Mariupol), which was part of the Ukrainian SSR in the Soviet Union at the time of his birth. He is ethnically Russian and the son of Anatoly Yakovlevich, a metallurgist at the Illich Steel and Iron Works, and Nadezhda Iosifovna, a crane operator at Azovstal Iron and Steel Works. After graduating from secondary school, Matiyenkov immediately pursued higher education, and in 1980 graduating from the Mechanical and Metallurgical Faculty at Pryazovskyi State Technical University with a specialisation as an engineer-mechanic. He then entered the workforce, first becoming a foreman at workshop No. 1 of the Feodosia Mechanical Plant in Crimea. After two years there, he returned to Zhdanov to begin working at the Illich Steel and Iron Works. He first started as a shift supervisor, then section chief of the repair and mechanical shop No. 4 until 1984, and then he became an instructor for the party committee of the plant and district until 1988. Matiyenkov then briefly left the job from 1988 to 1990, when he was appointed Deputy Secretary of the Party Committee for the Illichivskyi District of Zhadnov. He left politics again in 1990 when he was appointed Head of the Bureau and later Deputy Chief of the Chief Mechanic's Administrative Department at Illich. After the collapse of the Soviet Union, he was appointed Deputy General Director for Social Services and General Affairs at Illich, a position he held for six years. Later on he was promoted to First Deputy General Direector at Chief Engineer for the plant.

== Political career ==
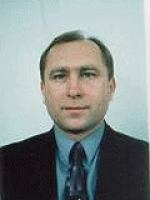
Matiyenkov as a young deputy in 1998 during his first convocation.

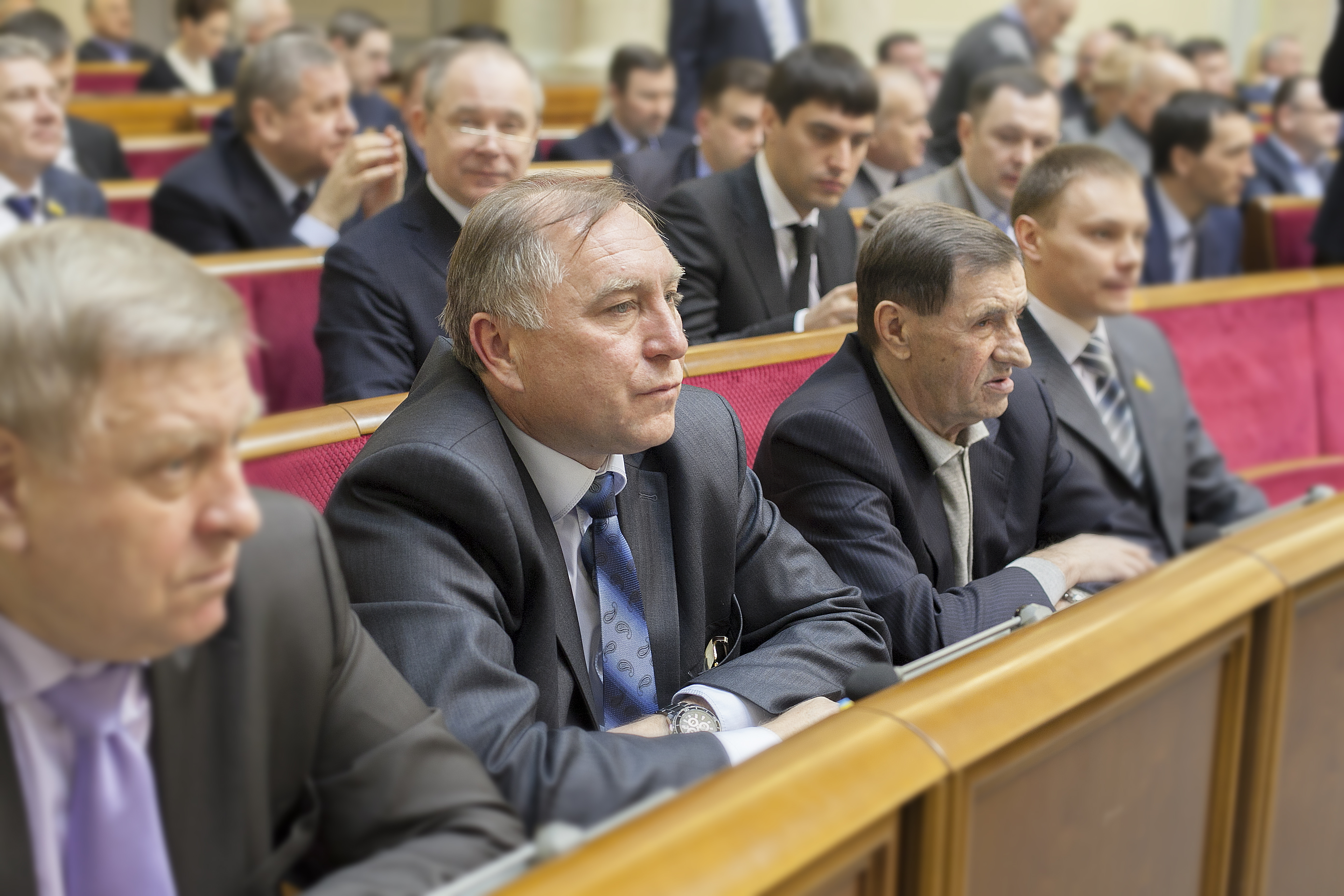
Matiyenkov sitting next to his fellow deputy from Mariupol and Illich, Volodymyr Boyko, in the Verkhovna Rada, 2013.

After having a brief two-year stint in politics during the Soviet era, he returned to politics in the now independent Ukraine in 1994 when he was elected a deputy of the Mariupol City Council. After his term ended in 1998, he ran for the 1998 Ukrainian parliamentary elections in constituency No. 55 (Donetsk Oblast). After being successfully elected to the third convocation, he was initially a member of the NDP faction until 1998, when he defected to the new Party of Regions in 1999, a party he stayed with for the rest of the convocation. He was also Chair of the Subcommittee on the Mining and Metallurgical Complex and the Chemical Industry within the Committee on Industrial Policy until the end of this convocation. After it ended in 2002, he ran for re-election in constituency No. 55 again during the 2002 Ukrainian parliamentary election with For United Ukraine! He won in a landslide with 68.02% of the vote against 6 other candidates. After joining the Rada, he switched parties multiple times: he started within For United Ukraine!, then he became an independent, then the European Choice faction, then the Party of Regions, back to an independent, and then the Socialist Party of Ukraine finally in 2005. He retained his chairmanship of the previous subcommittee from the third convocation.

After the end of the fourth convocation, he ran for a third term during the 2006 Ukrainian parliamentary elections, this time with the SPU. He was on its party list at No. 25, and was thus successfully elected. Upon again re-entering the Rada, Matiyenkov entered the SPU faction and became Deputy Chairman of the Committee on Industrial and Regulatory Policy. The fifth convocation, however, ended early and was dissolved in 2007. Towards the end of his mandate, he said in April 2007 that there were "legal grounds" for starting impeachment procedures against the then president, Viktor Yushchenko, as he said the dissolution of the parliament was unconstitutional. In the snap 2007 Ukrainian parliamentary elections, he ran again on the party list with the SPU, where he was placed No. 13. He was ultimately not selected because the Socialist Party failed to clear the 3% threshold needed to enter parliament, getting just below it and thus obtaining no seats. He later left the SPU, and was elected to the Donetsk Oblast Council in 2010 with the Party of Regions.

Matiyenkov then immediately registered for the 2012 Ukrainian parliamentary elections, this time for the Party of Regions in constituency No. 57. At the time of its creation in 2012, it included the Kalmiuskyi District and Livoberezhnyi District of Mariupol. The election race went on without much drama, and he won 60.50% of the vote against 7 other opponents. Upon re-joining the Rada, he became a member of the Party of Regions faction and was Secretary of the Committee on Entrepreneurship, Regulatory, and Antimonopoly Policy. During the War in the Donbas, his constituency, along with the rest of Mariupol, was briefly taken by militants associated with the pro-Russian, separatist Donetsk People's Republic (DPR). During this time, he signed an open letter with numerous other influential personalities in Mariupol, which stated their opposition to the DPR and radicalism. However, they also called for more decentralisation and for the Russian language to become official in the letter.

After the early dissolution, he ran for re-election in the same constituency, but this time as a self-nominated candidate. He won with 64.16% of the vote against 13 other candidates, although one candidate accused him of falisifcations during the election. After joining the parliament, he joined the pro-Russian Opposition Bloc, and became a member of the Committee on Economic Policy. In the years 2017-2018, he sparked debate over the Russian language in parliament. During a session in February 2017, Matiyenkov initially attempted to talk about the situation with medicine in Mariupol in Russian, which led the Chairman of the Verkhovna Rada, Andriy Parubiy, to interrupt him and call on all deputies to speak Ukrainian. After this, Paraubiy submitted a bill to amend the legislation, which would require all speeches in the Rada to be performed in the Ukrainian language, the only state language. A year later, he continued to speak Russian in the parliament, after which Iryna Herashchenko, the then First Deputy Chairman of the Verkhovna Rada, also interrupted him and told him to speak Ukrainian. Matiyenkov ignored her and continued to speak in Russian, which led to his microphone being turned off and him not being allowed to finish his question. The Prime Minister, Volodymyr Groysman, then urged everyone "not to divide Ukraine into factions based on how people speak". During that same convocation, he co-drafted a resolution with Yuriy Voropaev that would grant amnesty to all participants in the events of the Donbas, including former militants. In 2016, the draft was later ordered by the Shevchenkivskyi District Court of Kyiv to be investigated for possible offenses. He did not run for re-election during the 2019 Ukrainian parliamentary elections.

== Personal life ==
He is married to Iryna Pavlivna, a music worker at the children's factory No. 84 in Mariupol. Together, they have two children: a son, Alexei (born in 1978), and a daughter, Hope (born in 1983). In 2018, he bought an apartment in Mariupol.

== Honours and awards ==
Matiyenkov has been awarded the following honours and awards:

- Order of Merit, III degree (2011)
- Honorary Diploma of the Verkhovna Rada of Ukraine
