= The City of the Heroes =

- Opening title of the last film of the cycle
- Directed by: Ivan Syniepalov
- Screenplay by: Ivan Syniepalov
- Cinematography: Illya Shafoval
- Edited by: Aykhan Hajibayli
- Production company: Public TV of Azov
- Release date: December 2, 2015
- Running time: 40 min. x 10 ep.
- Country: Ukraine
- Languages: Ukrainian, Russian
- Budget: $17,105

The City of the Heroes (Ukrainian: Місто героїв) — is a series of documentaries about Mariupol, produced in 2015–2016 by Public TV of Azov. The films were presented in two stages: the first 5 were screened in December 2015, the last 5 were screened in August 2016. The final film "Ukraine is Mariupol" — was released on August, 14 and screened on September 16, 2016.

The cycle portrays the life of Mariupol in the conditions of hybrid warfare between 2014 and 2016. Each film describes a specific part of Mariupol life including: (elections, self-defense, and the Minsk process)

== Films ==
=== Film one. Mariupol self-defense unit ===
"Mariupol self-defense unit" (Ukrainian: Самооборона Маріуполя) - is a film about the people who started the underground struggle against the "DNR" during the occupation of Mariupol and continued to defend the city after the Russian army invaded Ukraine. Film characters: members of the Self-defense unit and its commanders.

=== Film two. From election to election ===
"From election to election" (Ukrainian: Від виборів до виборів) - is a film about how the electoral field of Mariupol has changed after the Euromaidan win, in which new political forces appeared and some become less influential. The main focus is on the 2015 local elections. Film characters - the participants of the election process in 2015, public activists.

=== Film three. Volunteer day ===
"Volunteer Day" (Ukrainian: День волонтера) - is a film about how a typical day of a Mariupol volunteer. All areas of volunteer activity are covered - volunteer kitchen for soldiers, material assistance to soldiers of the UAF, assistance for children in need, social activities and participate in elections. Film characters - 5 Mariupol volunteers.

=== Film four. Sector «M» ===
"Sector M" (Ukrainian: Сектор "М") - is a film about how to live in frontline villages around Mariupol, the problems people there face and how they resolve them, also the film shows an interaction between local residents, authorities and ATO soldiers. Film characters – villagers of Sector "M", local authorities, the UAF soldiers.

=== Film five. After Minsk ===
"After Minsk" (Ukrainian: Після Мінська) - is a film about how life has changed in Mariupol after the Minsk agreements in September 2014 and February 2015 were signed, and also tells what Mariupol has to expect after the Minsk agreement expiration date. Movie characters - deputy head of ATO Taras Dziuba, Chairman of Donetsk OMCA Pavlo Zhebrivsky, Mayor of Mariupol Vadym Boychenko, commander of the Azov Battalion Andriy Biletsky, EU Ambassador to Ukraine Jan Tombiński, deputy head of the OSCE SMM in Ukraine Alexander Hug, and political scientist Maria Podybaylo.

=== Film six. Black January ===
"Black January" (Ukrainian: Чорний січень) – is a film dedicated to the shelling of Mariupol by terrorists that took place on January 24, 2014. The film shows this tragedy in the context of two other terrorist attacks that have happened that month – the Volnovakha bus attack and the Donetsk bus shelling incident. Film characters – Yuri Khotlubey the former mayor of Mariupol, fire fighters, volunteers and victims of shelling.

=== Film seven. First blood ===
"First blood" (Ukrainian: Перша кров) – is a film about the events that took place in Mariupol on May 9, 2014, when the terrorist group "Mongoose" tried to capture Mariupol police department. That was a first battle of the Russian-Ukrainian war in Mariupol, and it led to the liberation of Mariupol on June 13, 2014. Film characters – the participants of those events.

=== Film eight. The new city power ===
"The new city power" (Ukrainian: Нова влада) – a film about the city authorities which were elected in November, 2015. This film is a logical continuation of the film "From election to election". Film characters – members of all factions of the city council, Vadym Boychenko, the mayor of the city, and a political scientist.

=== Film nine. Start life again ===
"Start life again" (Ukrainian: Життя спочатку) – is a film about internally displaced persons who came from temporary occupied territories to Mariupol. Film characters – IDPs who are engaged in different areas: volunteer, soldier, blogger, entrepreneur and civil servant.

=== Film ten. Ukraine is Mariupol ===
"Ukraine is Mariupol" (Ukrainian: Україна - це Маріуполь) – is the final film from the series "The City of the Heroes". This film describes what people from the largest cities of Ukraine: (Dnipro, Kharkiv, Kyiv, Lviv and Odesa) know and think about Mariupol. Film characters – officials and civic activists from these cities, and also their ordinary citizens.

== See also ==
- Year of freedom. Mariupol after DNR
