= Battle of Mariupol (May–June 2014) =

2014 battle in the war in Donbas

Coordinates: 47°5′45″N 37°32′58″E

- Part of the war in Donbas
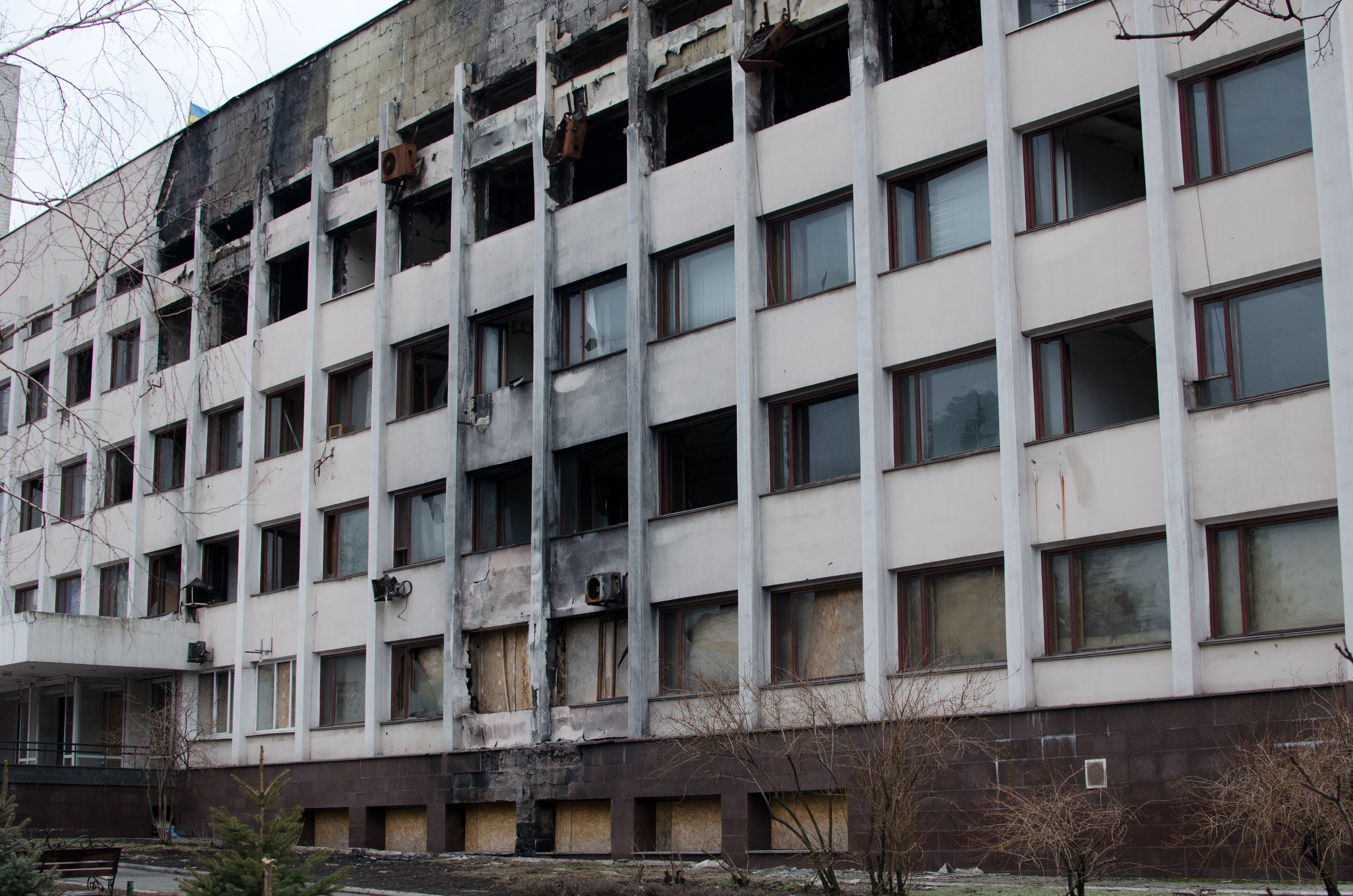
- Damage in Mariupol
Date	6 May – 14 June 2014 (1 month, 1 week and 1 day)
Location	Mariupol, Donetsk Oblast, Ukraine
Result	Government victory: Ukrainian forces regain complete control of Mariupol; Mariupol becomes the provisional capital of Donetsk Oblast

Belligerents
Ukraine	Donetsk People's Republic

Commanders and leaders
Arsen Avakov; Serhiy Demydenko †; Valery Androshchuk (POW)	Denis Kuzmenko (POW); Igor Khakimzyanov (POW)

Units involved
Armed Forces of Ukraine; Ukrainian Ground Forces; 72nd Guards Mechanized Brigade; Ministry of Internal Affairs; National Guard of Ukraine; 17th Motorized Battalion; Azov Battalion; Dnipro Battalion; 49th Public Order Regiment; Lviv Regiment; Militsiya	Donbas People's Militia: Sparta Battalion; Defected policemen

Strength
400	60

Casualties and losses
20 killed 49 wounded 1 captured 3 APCs destroyed	20–26 killed 15–34 captured 1 BRDM-2 destroyed

During the 2014 pro-Russian unrest in Ukraine in the aftermath of the Revolution of Dignity, the city of Mariupol, in Donetsk Oblast, saw skirmishes break out between Ukrainian government forces, local police, and separatist militants affiliated with the Donetsk People's Republic. Government forces withdrew from Mariupol on 9 May 2014 after heavy fighting left the city's police headquarters gutted by fire. These forces maintained checkpoints outside the city. Intervention by Metinvest steelworkers on 15 May 2014 led to the removal of barricades from the city centre, and the resumption of patrols by local police. Separatists continued to operate a headquarters in another part of the city until their positions were overrun in a government offensive on 13 June 2014.

== Background ==
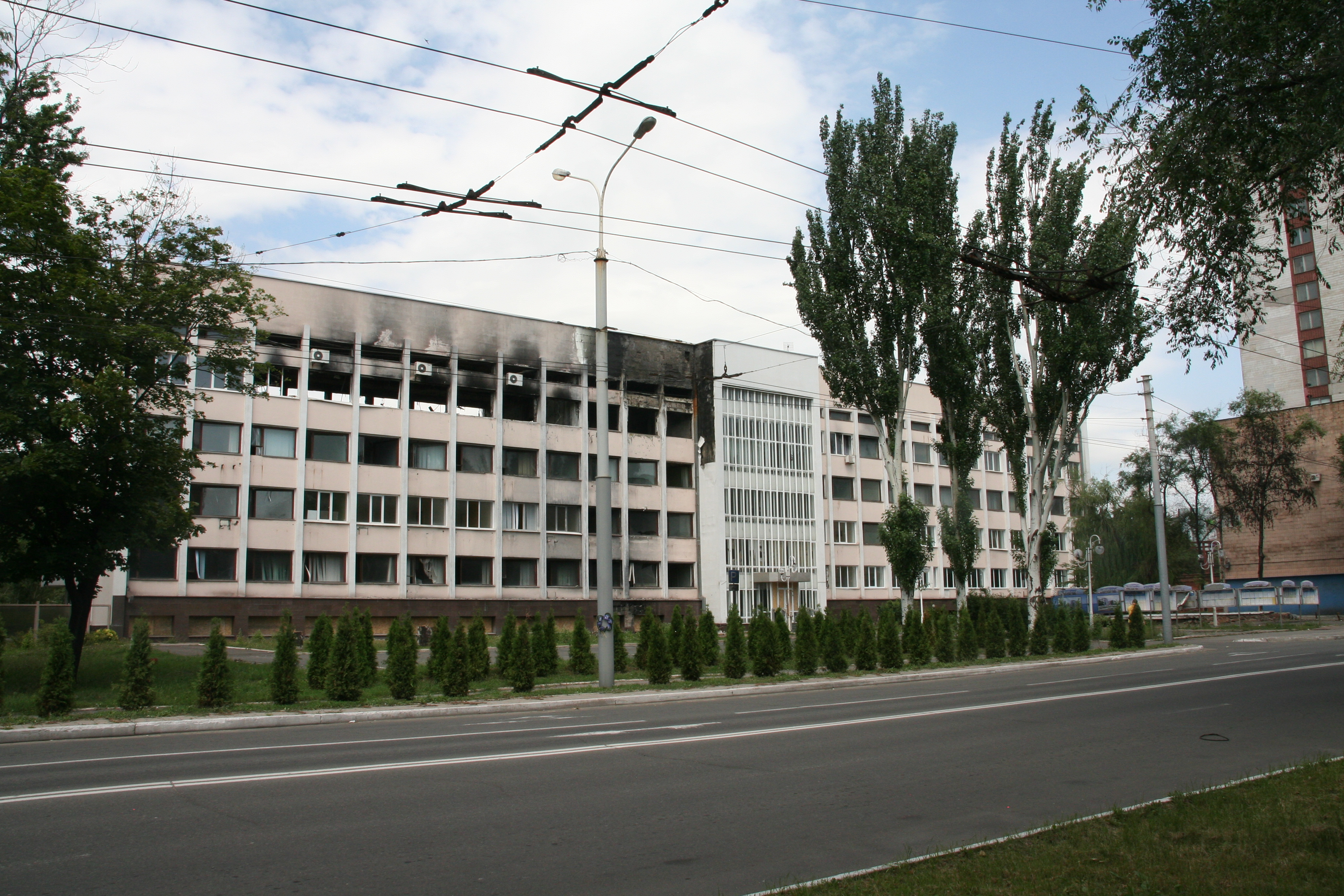
Mariupol City Hall, damaged by a fire during clashes in May 2014

Mariupol is the second-largest city in Donetsk Oblast, and had experienced sporadic unrest since March 2014. Pro-Russian and anti-government groups first occupied the city council building on 18 March 2014. On 13 April 2014, around a thousand demonstrators again stormed the city hall after riot officers were outnumbered and were forced to retreat. The first violent incident had occurred during the night on 16 April 2014, when about 300 pro-Russian and anti-government protesters attacked a Ukrainian military unit in Mariupol, throwing petrol bombs. Internal Affairs minister Arsen Avakov said that troops were forced to open fire, resulting in the killing of three of the attackers.

Ukrainian government forces claimed they "liberated" the Mariupol City Council on 24 April 2014, though this was heavily disputed by anti-government demonstrators, and a BBC report said that there was "no sign" of the army. The building changed hands multiple times thereafter, but was captured by the army on 8 May.

== Events ==
A violent clash involving armoured personnel carriers (APC) took place at the Mariupol police headquarters on Victory Day, 9 May 2014. The Ukrainian government said it sent in the APCs in response to an attempt by militant separatists to storm the building. According to the Internal Affairs Ministry, the assault on the station involved 60 separatists armed with automatic weapons. Valeriy Androshchuk, the newly appointed chief of the Mariupol police, was taken captive and tortured by the separatists. Some local policemen reportedly helped the militants during the takeover and later clashed with Internal Troops who fired on the building with heavy machine guns mounted on the APCs.

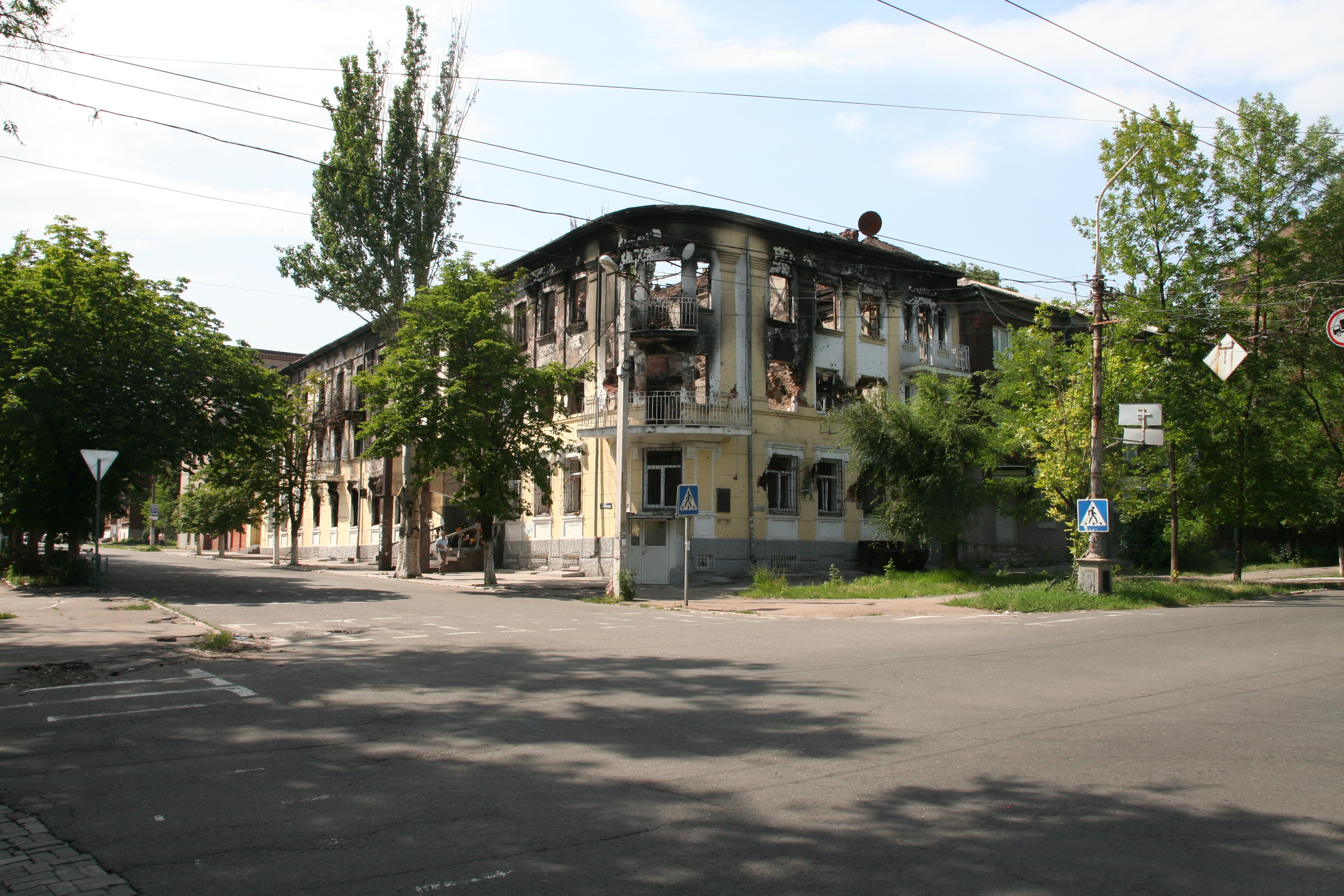
The police headquarters in Mariupol, destroyed in the fighting of May 2014

The Ukrainian government said its contingent included police, as well as an Omega unit of the National Guard. Pro-Russian protesters attempted to stop the advance, but were unsuccessful. Ukrainian security forces attacked the police headquarters in an attempt to recapture it from militants, and during the assault the building caught fire. According to Internal Affairs minister Arsen Avakov, a separatist sniper fired at Ukrainian soldiers and civilians from the upper floors of a hospital. Avakov said that the counterattack resulted in the deaths of twenty separatists, and the capture of four, while the rest dispersed. He referred to the separatist militants as "terrorists", and warned that "annihilation" would be Ukraine's answer to future acts of terrorism.

Avakov's account of what happened was contested by some Mariupol residents, who spoke to reporters from The New York Times, the BBC, and The Independent shortly after the incident. The residents (many of whom showed their Ukrainian passports to prove they were not from Russia) said that the government had attacked local police who were sympathetic to protesters. One version of events, put forward by a group of residents cited by The New York Times, was that the clash was sparked by Mariupol police rebelling against a new police chief sent by the interim government in Kyiv. The BBC report included a video showing pro-Russian activists trying unsuccessfully to stop armoured vehicles from moving into the city.

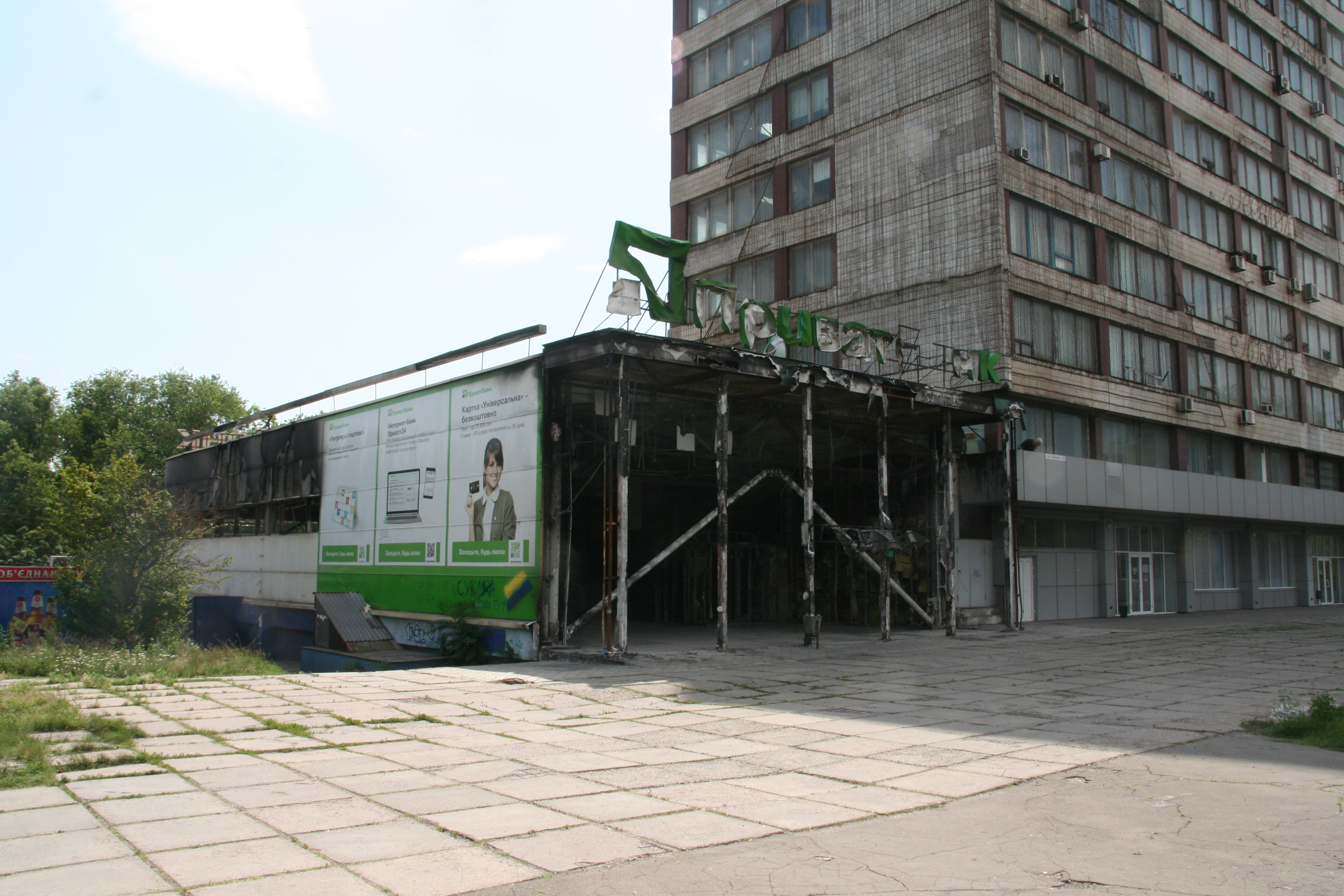
Burnt-out office of PrivatBank in Mariupol. The building was set on fire on 4 May 2014.

After the fighting the Ukrainian forces withdrew from the city, leaving it fully under control of pro-Russian protesters. The military retained control over checkpoints surrounding the city. The Ukrainian government said that its forces withdrew "to avoid further aggravation". The troops moving out of the city shot at unarmed civilians, according to The Guardian. Anna Neistat from Human Rights Watch stated "my preliminary findings suggest that Ukrainian units might indeed have used excessive force near the drama theater, which resulted in deaths and injuries of some unarmed people" and urged a full, thorough investigation.

One armoured personnel carrier was captured by pro-Russian protesters. After the clashes, the protesters built barricades on roads in the city centre. Overnight, the city administration building was set ablaze and three gun shops were looted. The next day, insurgents set alight the captured armoured vehicle, causing the ammunition inside to explode. Individuals also threw petrol bombs at the city prosecutor's office and a military building, setting them on fire. On 11 May 2014, eight polling places were set up in Mariupol for the DPR's referendum on self-rule. The low number of polling places caused queues hundreds of metres long.

=== Intervention of Metinvest steelworkers ===
Metinvest in conjunction with owners Rinat Akhmetov and Vadim Novinsky announced on 11 May 2014 that the company would be forming citywide militia groups from local steelworkers to work with police. The squads were intended to "protect civilians from looters and criminals operating in the city". Akhmetov urged the Ukrainian government to refrain from sending its forces to the city and to start negotiations with the insurgents.

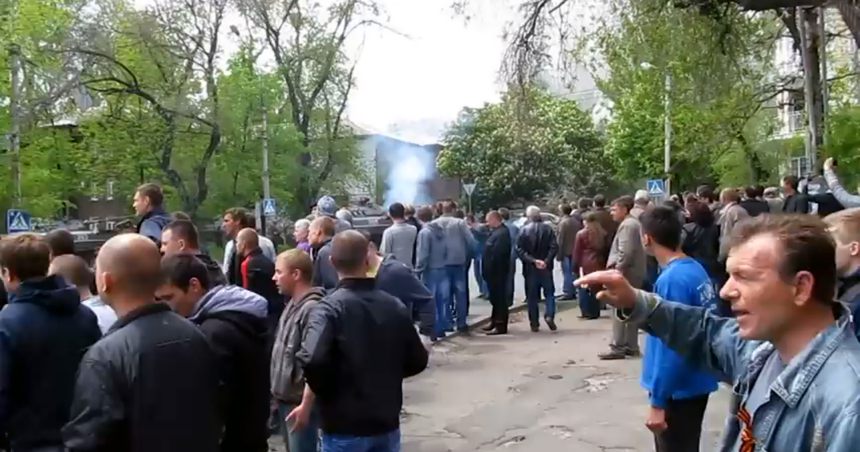
Civilians gather next to a deployment of soldiers.

An agreement initiated by Metinvest was signed on 15 May by steel plant directors, police and community leaders, and a representative of the Donetsk People's Republic separatists. Steelworkers and security guards from Metinvest, along with local police, began joint patrols in the city of Mariupol. Associated Press reported that these groups forced the insurgents out of the buildings that they had been occupying. Although a DPR representative was party to the deal which led to this vacation of buildings by the insurgents, a local commander of those insurgents who had been occupying the building said that "someone is trying to sow discord among us, someone has signed something, but we will continue our fight", and that "everyone ran away". Steelworkers could be seen removing barricades from the city centre, and also cleaning up the burnt city administration building. By the morning of 16 May 2014, Associated Press journalists could find no trace of the insurgents in Mariupol city centre. On 16 May, however, it seemed that separatists were not banished from the city: reporters from The Washington Post said that about a hundred pro-Russian activists gathered on the steps of the city administration building, and that the separatist flag continued to fly over it. Radio Free Europe reported on 17 May that separatist militants (unarmed, but some wearing balaclavas) were patrolling Mariupol alongside police. On 19 May 2014, CNN reporters found DPR supporters, including armed militia, running their headquarters in a suburb of Mariupol. The leader of the group, Denis Kuzmenko, told the reporters he welcomed the role of the steelworkers in the city.

=== Government recapture of Mariupol ===
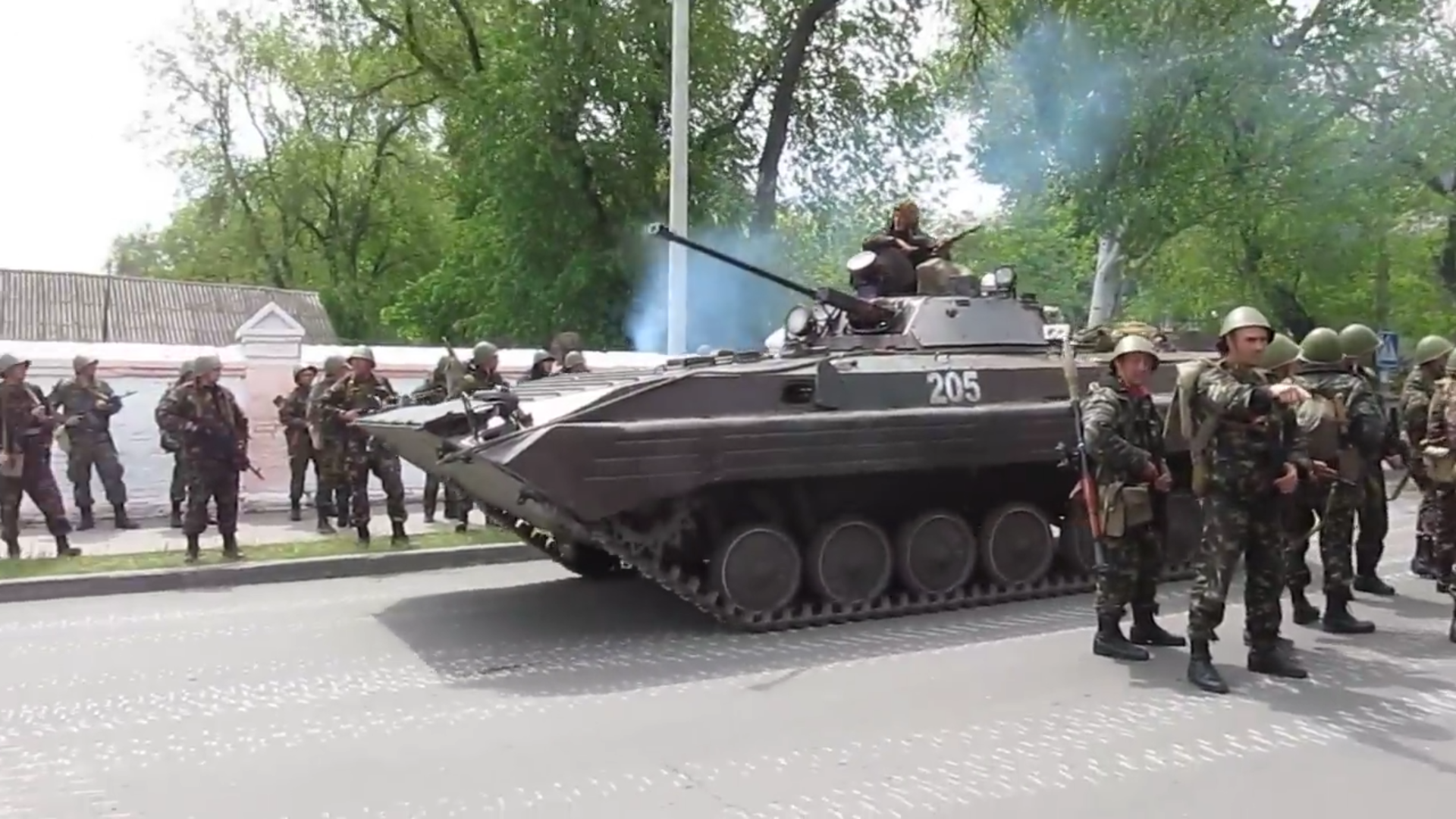
Ukrainian Army soldiers and BMP-2 IFV in Mariupol on 9 May 2014

On the morning of 13 June 2014, heavy fighting resumed as part of military operations in Mariupol, in which the Azov and Dnipro-1 Battalions retook the city and key buildings occupied by insurgents, killing five militants and destroying an insurgent BRDM-2 armoured vehicle. Two soldiers were also killed and 4–11 separatists were captured. A military armoured personnel carrier was destroyed during the fighting. Internal Affairs minister Avakov said "All key terrorist strongholds are being brought under control".

As a result of the six-hour battle, Ukrainian forces hoisted the national flag over the insurgent headquarters in the city and said they had regained control of a 121-kilometre (75 mi) stretch of the border with Russia. Immediately following the operation, Ukrainian president Petro Poroshenko instructed the chief of the Donetsk regional state administration Serhiy Taruta to temporarily move the regional capital to Mariupol. A minor incident occurred the next morning, when a convoy of border guardsmen was attacked by insurgents whilst passing Mariupol, leaving five guardsmen dead and seven wounded.

OSCE monitors visited Mariupol to assess the situation in the city on 18 August. They reported that the city was calm and secure. They spoke to a local activist who told them that "the city had become stable" in the months after the recapture of the city by government forces. According to UNHCR, there were at least 4,000 refugees from the ongoing war in the Donbas region at the time that the monitors visited the city. Unofficial statistics cited by the OSCE gave the number of refugees in Mariupol as 20,000.

== Casualties ==
Video of a captured BRDM-2 in Mariupol with the sign "DPR"

There were conflicting reports regarding the number and identity of the dead with regard to the 9 May 2014 incident. Internal Affairs minister Arsen Avakov stated that the operation resulted in the death of one policeman, and about twenty people described as "terrorists". Four militants were captured and five policemen were wounded. The Daily Telegraph reported that some locals thought that most of the between five and twenty people killed were innocent civilians.

City traffic police chief Viktor Sayenko was killed in the fighting on 9 May. A Euronews report said Mariupol residents, including the priest who conducted Sayenko's funeral, were unsure how he was killed, or who was responsible. Chief of Police Valery Andruschuk was captured by pro-Russian forces. He was released on 12 May, and was found in serious condition with a brain injury, brain contusion, and broken ribs. It was confirmed later that two pro-government territorial defence battalion paramilitaries were killed as well. One of them was the deputy commander of the Dnipro Battalion, Serhiy Demydenko, who was killed by sniper fire. Citing eyewitnesses, Mariupol internet publication 0629 reported that "terrorists took Demidenko's dead body and cut his ears off and gouged his eyes." Eight soldiers were also wounded in the fighting.

The Mariupol city administration declared 10 May 2014 as a day of mourning in honour of those killed in the 9 May incident. Residents placed flowers in front of the gutted police station. A large public funeral was held in Kyiv on 12 May for an Azov Battalion member who was killed in the fighting.

A further violent death was reported on 25 May, when the Ukrainian government said its special police had killed a bodyguard of Mariupol DPR leader Denis Kuzmenko, while arresting Kuzmenko himself. Five separatists and two soldiers were killed during the takeover of the city by the military on 13 June 2014. Five border guards were killed and seven wounded in an ambush attack on a military convoy on 14 June 2014.

A report by Human Rights Watch said that the Ukrainian military may have used excessive force during the battle of Mariupol.

In January 2015, Kyiv Post cited a Bellingcat citizen's investigation into the May 2014 events in Mariupol. It asserted that Ukrainian soldiers had made a decided effort to avoid firing directly at the protesters, whilst taking fire and suffering casualties themselves. According to the investigation, of the thirteen people listed killed, six were Ukrainian law enforcement officers, soldiers, or members of the Azov Battalion.

== Legacy ==
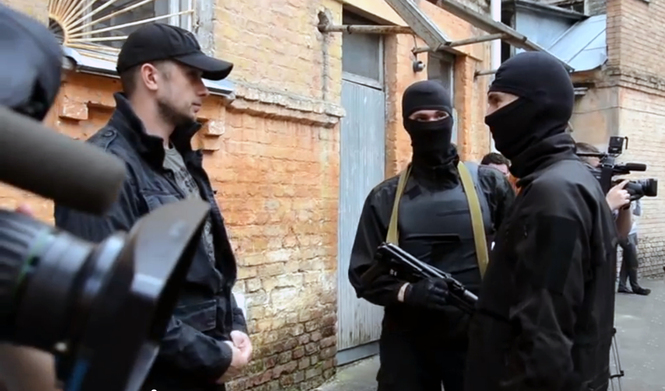
Andriy Biletsky with volunteer of the Azov Battalion patrolling the streets on the aftermath of the Battle of Mariupol, June 2014

Several months following this battle, a second battle broke out in the city as pro-Russian separatists again tried to break into the city, but also failed. Ukrainian control in the city would remain until the Siege of Mariupol in May 2022 following the Russian invasion of Ukraine.

=== Anniversary celebrations ===
On 13 June 2015, a monument to the defenders of the Military Unit No. 3057 was unveiled in the city on the first anniversary of the battle. A documentary film on the Public TV of Azov called Year of Freedom. Mariupol After DNR was released in 2015. Mariupol Liberation Day from Russian Occupation (Ukrainian: День звільнення Маріуполя від проросійських терористів) was celebrated annually on 13 June, being an official holiday in the city. It was first celebrated at the state level in 2016 (the second anniversary). On this day, the Azov Regiment held an organized military parade at 10:00 am.

On Liberation Day 2019, the traditional military parade was held, during which soldiers of the Azov Regiment, Military Unit 3057, representatives of the National Police and the State Border Guard Service of Ukraine marched. President Volodymyr Zelenskyy paid an official visit to the city, attending joint military exercises and the opening of a demining center. Gala concerts were also held throughout the city.

== See also ==
- Offensive on Mariupol (September 2014)
- Offensive on Mariupol (January 2015)
