= Yuriy Khotlubei =

Ukrainian politician (born 1944)

- Юрій Хотлубєй
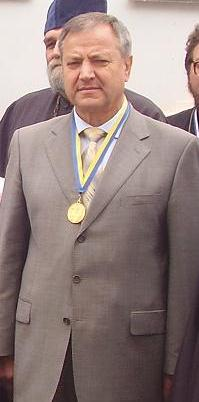
- Khotlubei, July 2008

2nd Mayor of Mariupol
- In office 29 March 1998 – 15 December 2015
- Preceded by: Mykhailo Pozhyvanov
- Succeeded by: Vadym Boychenko

Member of the Verkhovna Rada
- In office 15 May 1990 – 10 May 1994

Personal details
- Born: Yuriy Yuriyovych Khotlubei; 12 January 1944 (age 82) Zhelanne, Ukrainian SSR, Soviet Union
- Party: Party of Regions

Yuriy Yuriyvovych Khotlubei (Ukrainian: Юрій Юрійович Хотлубєй; born on 12 January 1944) is a Ukrainian politician who had served as the second Mayor of Mariupol from 1998 to 2015. He had also served as the Member of the Verkhovna Rada from 1990 to 1994.

== Biography ==
Khotlubei was born on 12 January 1944 in Greek ethnicity. He began his career in 1960 as a locksmith at the Donetsk Metallurgical Plant. In 1966, he graduated from the Donetsk Polytechnic Institute, and he worked as a foreman, senior foreman, mechanic at the Pavlodar aluminum plant. He served in the army.

In 1975, he worked as an instructor in Donetsk, then as head of the department of the city committee, first secretary of the Leninsky district committee of the Communist Party of Ukraine. He then worked as an inspector, head of a sector of the department of organizational, party and personnel work of the Central Committee of the Communist Party of Ukraine.

In 1986 he graduated from the Academy of Social Sciences under the Central Committee of the CPSU in Moscow.

In 1989, he was elected First Secretary of the Mariupol City Committee of the Communist Party of Ukraine.

On 15 May 1990, Khotlubei was elected People's Deputy of Ukraine.

In 1994, he lost to Mykhailo Pozhyvanov in the election of the mayor of Mariupol. The same year, he was the Head of the department for the Market of Goods and Services of the Cabinet of Ministers of Ukraine, Head of the Department of Organizational Work and Personnel Policy of the Administration of the President of Ukraine.

In 1998, Khotlubei was elected Mayor of Mariupol.

He contributed to the popularization and development of basketball in the Mariupol region. He is a co-founder and curator of the Ukrainian basketball giant BC Azovmash.

On his initiative, the city implements programs to reorganize housing and communal services, improve water supply and sanitation.

In 2000, Mariupol took third place in Ukraine in the "City of the Best Improvement" competition.

In 2014, Khotlubei spoke out against “what happened on the Maidan, when Molotov cocktails were thrown at law enforcement officers, and the protesters dismantled the pavement”, organized the dispatch of hundreds of public utilities workers to an anti-Maidan rally in Kyiv in January 2014. The absence of public utilities in Mariupol led to a collapse when the city was covered with snow, and there was no one to fight the elements.

At the same time, in the summer of 2014, Khotlubei stated that he was frankly against the policy that was promoted at pro-Russian rallies in Mariupol, although he wore a St. Russia, and supported at that time a referendum on the fate of the region.

From August to September 2014, he took an active part in events in support of the unity of Ukraine and the creation of defensive fortifications in Mariupol. On his initiative, in August 2014, two monuments to Lenin were demolished in the city.

On 31 January 2015, in Mariupol, during a requiem rally in connection with the shelling of the Vostochny microdistrict, he informed the participants of the rally about his support for the decision of the Verkhovna Rad to recognize the Russian Federation as an aggressor party, and the DPR and LPR as terrorist organizations, which was announced the day before a decision was made at a session of the Mariupol City Council.

== Family ==
He is married with two children.
