= Oleksandr Bulianda =

Soviet-Ukrainian businessman and politician (1937–2006)

- Олександр Булянда; Александр Булянда
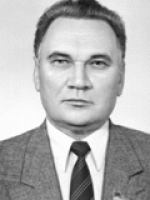

People's Deputy of Ukraine
- In office 15 May 1990 – 10 May 1994
- Preceded by: Position established
- Succeeded by: Viktor Shestakov
- Constituency: Donetsk Oblast, Ordzhonikidze District, Mariupol

Deputy of the Supreme Soviet of the Ukrainian SSR
- In office 1985–1990

First Secretary of the Zhdanov Municipal Committee of the Communist Party of Ukraine
- In office 1984–1985
- Preceded by: Volodymyr Zharkov
- Succeeded by: Stanislav Kuzenin

Personal details
- Born: 3 June 1937 Novhorodske, Ukrainian SSR, Soviet Union (now New York, Ukraine)
- Died: 10 May 2006 (aged 68) Mariupol, Ukraine
- Party: Independent
- Other political affiliations: Communist Party of the Soviet Union (until 1991)
- Scientific career
- Education: Stalino Polytechnic Institute (KN, 1960)
- Fields: Metallurgy
- Thesis: Modeli ta metody adaptyvnoho stratehichnoho planuvannia u velykomu promyslovomu kompleksi (1997)

Oleksandr Oleksiiovych Bulianda (Note: In this name that follows East Slavic naming customs, the patronymic is Oleksiiovych and the family name is Bulianda.) (Note: Ukrainian: Олекса́ндр Олексі́йович Буля́нда; Russian: Александр Алексеевич Булянда, romanised: Aleksandr Alekseyevich Bulyanda) (3 June 1937 – 10 May 2006) was a Soviet and Ukrainian businessman and politician who served as a People's Deputy of Ukraine from 1990 to 1994, representing Ordzhonikidze District (now Livoberezhnyi District) in Mariupol. Previously, he served as a deputy in the eleventh Supreme Soviet of the Ukrainian Soviet Socialist Republic and as First Secretary of the Zhdanov Municipal Committee from 1984 to 1985. He was director of Azovstal Iron and Steel Works from 1985 to 1998.

== Early life and business career ==
Oleksandr Oleksiiovych Bulianda was born 3 June 1937 in the town of New York (then known as Novhorodske) to a working class Ukrainian family. From 1955 to 1960 he studied at Stalino Polytechnic Institute (now Donetsk National Technical University), graduating with a specialisation in metallurgy. He defended his Candidate of Economic Sciences thesis, titled Models and methods of adaptive strategic planning in large industrial complexes, (Note: Ukrainian: Моделі та методи адаптивного стратегічного планування у великому промисловому комплексі, romanised: Modeli ta metody adaptyvnoho stratehichnoho planuvannia u velykomu promyslovomu kompleksi) before the Academy of Public Sciences of the Central Committee of the Communist Party of the Soviet Union (now the Russian Academy of State Service). It was released in 1997.

Bulianda became secretary of the Communist Party of the Soviet Union committee at Donetsk Metallurgical Plant in 1960. From 1978, he was director of the heavy industry directorate of the Donetsk Regional Committee of the Communist Party of Ukraine. In 1981, Bulianda became chief engineer and deputy director of Azovstal Iron and Steel Works; he later became the plant's director in 1985.

== Political career ==
From 1984 to 1985, Bulianda was first secretary of the Zhdanov (now Mariupol) municipal executive committee of the CPU.

Bulianda first sat in the eleventh Supreme Soviet of the Ukrainian Soviet Socialist Republic, and he was elected as a People's Deputy of Ukraine in the 1990 Ukrainian Supreme Soviet election for the CPSU, representing Mariupol's Ordzhonikidze District (now Livoberezhnyi District). He was elected in the first round of voting, with 52.05% of the vote against five opponents. In the Verkhovna Rada (Ukrainian parliament), he was not a member of any party faction. He was a member of the commission on economic reform and agricultural governance. Prior to the appointment of Leonid Kuchma as prime minister, Bulianda's name was publicly floated as a potential replacement for Vitold Fokin. In the 1994 Ukrainian presidential election. Bulianda backed incumbent president Leonid Kravchuk against Kuchma, arguing that Kuchma had "rose-tinted glasses" towards the Soviet period and that Kravchuk would, if re-elected, allow the government of Ukraine to manage the economy.

After leaving office, Bulianda retired from his position as director of Azovstal in 1998. He died in Mariupol on 10 May 2006.
