= Mayor of Mariupol =

The following is a list of mayors of the city of Mariupol. It includes positions equivalent to mayor, such as chairperson of the city council executive committee.

== Mayors ==
=== Russian Empire ===
#	Image	Name	Ukrainian Name	Term	Party	Notes
1		Stepan Vyalikov	Степан В'яликов	1778–1779		
2		Mykhaiil Khadzhi	Михаїл Хаджі	1780–1782		
3		Spyrydon Iliiw Khadzhi	Спиридон Ільїв Хаджі	1782–1785		
4		Ivan Horlenskyj	Іван Горленський	1788–1790		
5		Leontii Fedorovych Kaleri	Леонтій Федорович Калері	1797–1800		
6		Yakym Solotorov	Яким Золоторьов	around 1820		
7		Ivan Antonovych Chebanenko	Іван Антонович Чебаненко	1846–1852		
8		Stepan Yakymovych Solotarov	Степан Якимович Золотарьов	1857–1858		
9		Illia Leontiiovych Popov	Ілля Леонтійович Попов	1858–1860		
10		Safronii Kostiantynovych Karamanov	Сафроній Костянтинович Караманов	1860–1861		
11		Oleksii Yuriiovych Popov	Олексій Юрійович Попов	1861–1863		
12		Oleksandr Davydovych Kharadzhaiev	Олександр Давидович Хараджаєв	1864–1866		
13		Yakym Hryhorovych Attarinov	Яким Григорович Аттарінов	1866–1867		
14		Oleksandr Dmytrovych Trandafilov	Олександр Дмитрович Трандафілов	1872–1876		
15		Anton Ivanovych Chebanenko	Антон Іванович Чебаненко	?-1883		
16		Andrii Leontiiovych Melekov	Андрій Леонтійович Мелеков	1884–1886		
17		Stefan Fedorovych Horbachov	Стефан Федорович Горбачов	1888–1891		
18		Andrii Leontiiovych Melekov	Андрій Леонтійович Мелеков	1892–1895		
19		Ivan Oleksiiovich Popov	Іван Олексійович Попов	1896–Sept. 1917		
20		Hromenko	Громенко	March 1917– Apr. 1917		
21		Yakiv Yakovych Koval	Яків Якович Коваль	May 1917– Oct. 1917		

=== Soviet Union ===
#	Image	Name	Ukrainian Name	Term	Party	Notes
22		Vasyl Panasovych Varhanov	Василь Панасович Варганов	Oct. 1917– Dec. 1917		
23		V. T. Baliasov	Балясов	Jan. 1918		
24		Ivan Oleksiiovych Popov	Іван Олексійович Попов	Apr. 1918– Nov. 1918		
25		H. Ya. Sposobin	Г. Я. Способін	Nov. 1918– Jan. 1919		
26		Ivan Oleksiiovych Popov	Іван Олексійович Попов	Jan. 1919– Feb. 1919		
27		Kh. I. Danylov	Х. І. Данилов	Feb. 1919– March 1919		
28		Heorhii Antonovych Makedon	Георгій Антонович Македон	March 1919– May 1919		
29		Kh. I. Danylov	Х. І. Данилов	May 1919– Jan. 1920		
30		B. Shyshkov	Б. Шишков	Jan. 1920– March 1921		
31		Vasyl Rodionovych Morhunov	Василь Родіонович Моргунов	Mrz. 1921– Aug. 1922		
32		Kuzma Sakharovych Poliakov	Кузьма Захарович Поляков	Aug. 1922– Nov. 1923		
33		Mykola Hryhorovych Chudnenko	Микола Григорович Чудненко	Nov. 1923– May 1925		
34		Volodymyr Nykyforovych Bohutskyi	Володимир Никифорович Богуцький	May 1925– March 1927		
35		Maksym Ivanovych Vitolin	Максим Іванович Вітолін	March 1927– Jan. 1928		
36		Stovbur	Стовбур	Jan. 1928–Dez. 1929		
37		Maksym Fedorovych Nezhyvyi	Максим Федорович Неживий	1932		
38		Yevliev	Ієвлєв	March 1933		
39		Yastrzhembskyj	Ястржембський	Apr. 1933		
40		Heorhii Yukhymovych Holyshev	Георгій Юхимович Голишев	1935		
41		Ivan Kyrylovych Tretiakov	Іван Кирилович Третьяков	1939		
42		Hofmann		1942		German Military Commander of Mariupol
43		Michael		1943		German Military Commander of Mariupol
44		Ivan Kyrylovych Tretiakov	Іван Кирилович Третьяков	1943–Jun. 1946		
45		Yakiv Tymofiiovych Nekhtiienko	Яків Тимофійович Нехтієнко	Jan. 1945– Apr. 1946		
46		Sinko	Сінько	1946		
47		Nazar Lvovych Kudriavtsev	Назар Львович Кудрявцев	Aug. 1946– 22 Oct. 1948		
47		Nazar Lvovych Kudriavtsev	Назар Львович Кудрявцев	22 Oct. 1948 –1950		
48		Oleksii Oleksandrovych Skydskyi	Олексій Олександрович Скидський	1950–Oct. 1953		
49		Oleksii Illich Lyhachov	Олексій Ілліч Лигачов	Oct. 1953– Sep. 1958		
50		Oleksandr Andriiovych Raschupkin	Олександр Андрійович Расчупкін	Oct. 1958– Aug. 1964		
51		Vladyslav Pavlovych Honcharenko	Владислав Павлович Гончаренко	Aug. 1964–1967		
52		Borys Kachura (1930–2007)	Борис Васильович Качура	1967–1968		
53		Yurii Fedorovych Sannykov	Юрій Федорович Санников	1968– May 1977		
54		Viktor Hryhorovych Kucherenko(1931–1996)	Віктор Григорович Кучеренко	May 1977– May 1980		
55		Oleksandr Mykhailovych Zozulia	Олександр Михайлович Зозуля	May 1980– March 1990		

=== Ukraine ===
#	Image	Name	Ukrainian Name	Term	Party	Notes
56		Stanislav Herasymovych Kosheliev	Станіслав Герасимович Кошелєв	April 1990– December 1990		
57		Yuriy Khotlubei (1944–)	Юрій Юрійович Хотлубєй	December 1990– June 1994		
58		Mykhailo Pozhyvanov (1960–)	Михайло Олександрович Поживанов	June 1994– 8 July 1997	independent	
58		Mykhailo Pozhyvanov (1960–)	Михайло Олександрович Поживанов	June 1994– 8 July 1997	Liberal Party of Ukraine	
Mariupol Council of People's Deputies transformed into mayoral office with 9 July 1997
58		Mykhailo Pozhyvanov (1960–)	Михайло Олександрович Поживанов	9 July 1997– March 1998	Liberal Party of Ukraine	
58		Mykhailo Pozhyvanov (1960–)	Михайло Олександрович Поживанов	9 July 1997– March 1998	Reforms and Order Party	
59		Yuriy Khotlubei (1944–)	Юрій Юрійович Хотлубєй	29 March 1998– 14 December 2015	Party of Regions	First term (1998–2002) + second term (2002–2006)
59		Yuriy Khotlubei (1944–)	Юрій Юрійович Хотлубєй	29 March 1998– 14 December 2015	Party of Regions	Third term (2006–2010) + Fourth term (2010–2014)
59		Yuriy Khotlubei (1944–)	Юрій Юрійович Хотлубєй	29 March 1998– 14 December 2015	Party of Regions	Fifth term
60		Vadym Boychenko (1977–)	Вадим Сергійович Бойченко	since 15 December 2015	independent	First Term (15 December 2015–October 2020)
60		Vadym Boychenko (1977–)	Вадим Сергійович Бойченко	since 15 December 2015	Block Vadym Boychenko	Second Term (since October 2020) (de jure, Ukrainian administration)

=== Donetsk People's Republic/Russia ===
#	Image	Name	Term	Party	Ref
		Dmitriy Kuzmenko	2014 (de facto)		
61		Konstantin Ivashchenko	2022–2023 (de facto, DPR administration)	Opposition Platform — For Life	
62		Oleg Morgun	2023 (de facto, DPR administration)		

== First Secretary ==
#	Image	Name	Ukrainian Name	Term	Notes
		Oleksii Illich Lyhachov	Олексій Ілліч Лигачов	Nov. 1953	
		Kostiantyn Yakymovych Oliinychenko	Костянтин Якимович Олійниченко	Nov. 1953–1963	
		Dmytro Artemovych Nikitin	Дмитро Артемович Нікітін	1963–1966	
		Volodymyr Mykhailovych Tsybulko	Володимир Михайлович Цибулько	1966–1968	
		Borys Kachura (1930–2007)	Борис Васильович Качура	1968–1974	
		Volodymyr Ivanovych Zharkov	Володимир Іванович Жарков	1974–1984	
		Oleksandr Bulianda	Олександр Олексійович Булянда	1984–1985	
		Stanislav Petrovych Kusenin	Станіслав Петрович Кузенін	1985–1989	
		Yuriy Khotlubei (1944–)	Юрій Юрійович Хотлубєй	Jun. 1989–Jun. 1990	

== See also ==
- Mariupol history
