= Konstantin Ivashchenko =

Ukrainian separatist politician

Konstantin Ivaschenko
- Константи́н Ива́щенко
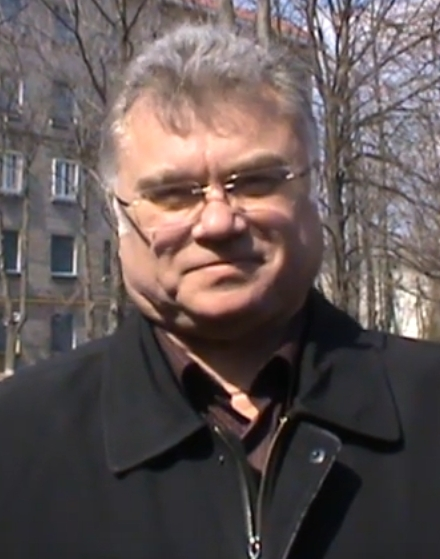
- Ivashchenko in 2019

50th Mayor of Mariupol
- (contested)
- In office disputed with Vadym Boychenko; 6 April 2022 – 23 January 2023
- Appointed by: Denis Pushilin
- Preceded by: Vadym Boychenko
- Succeeded by: Oleg Morgun

Personal details
- Born: 3 October 1963 (age 62) Zhdanov, Ukrainian SSR, Soviet Union (now Mariupol) (Note: Mariupol is claimed by both Russia and Ukraine. As of June 2026, Russia controls the city but is internationally recognized as being part of Ukraine.)
- Party: Opposition Platform — For Life
- Other political affiliations: Party of Regions; Our Land; Nashi
- Education: Saratov Military Command Engineering High School of Missile Forces

Konstantin Vladimirovich Ivashchenko (Note: Russian: Константи́н Влади́мирович Ива́щенко Ukrainian: Костянти́н Володи́мирович Іва́щенко, romanized: Kostiantyn Volodymyrovych Ivashchenko) (born 3 October 1963) is a Russian-Ukrainian pro-Russian politician and businessman who served as the de facto mayor of Mariupol from 6 April 2022 to 23 January 2023, following the capture of the city by the Donetsk People's Republic (DPR) and Russian troops.

== Early life and career ==
Konstantin Vladimirovich Ivashchenko was born on 3 October 1963 in Zhdanov (now Mariupol), then in the Ukrainian Soviet Socialist Republic of the Soviet Union. In 1985, he graduated from the Saratov Military Command Engineering High School of Missile Forces with a degree in engineering. Since 1992, he has been working at the Azovmash machine-building enterprise and was the head of the company from 2020 to April 2022.

== Political career ==
In 2010 local elections, he was elected to the Mariupol City Council as a member of the Party of Regions. He headed the party's Zhovtnevy district Mariupol branch. In 2015, he ran for the City Council as a member of Our Land, but he failed to get elected this time. Since 2016, he has been a member of the executive committee of the Mariupol City Council. He was the head of the Mariupol branch of the Nashi party. He was elected deputy in the Mariupol City Council once again in 2020 as a member of the Opposition Platform — For Life.

== Russian invasion of Ukraine ==
Following the partial capture of Mariupol by the Donetsk People's Republic (DPR) and Russian troops, Ivashchenko was appointed mayor of Mariupol by Denis Pushilin, the head of the Donetsk People's Republic. On 9 April, the Prosecutor's Office of the Donetsk Oblast notified Ivashchenko in absentia of suspicion of high treason committed under martial law. Ivashchenko was ordered to clear parts of downtown of rubble and bodies for a celebration of Victory Day on 9 May. Ivashchenko allegedly told the residents of Mariupol that the city will be annexed by Russia and incorporated into the Rostov Oblast. On 26 August, the Ukrainian Resistance Center reported that he left the city following an assassination attempt under the guise of medical treatment. Ivashchenko was relieved of his duties on 23 January 2023 and replaced by Oleg Morgun. Petro Andryushchenko, the exiled adviser to the Mayor of Mariupol, later claimed that Ivashchenko died in February 2023 of an unrelated cause, but no authorities have confirmed the claim.

== Sanctions ==
In July 2022 the EU imposed sanctions on Konstantin Ivashchenko in relation to the Russian invasion of Ukraine. He was also sanctioned by the United Kingdom in 2022, and was further levied additional sanctions by the government in 2023 and 2025.
