= Public TV of Azov =

Ukrainian internet newspaper

Public TV of Azov Громадське ТБ Приазов'я
- Country: Ukraine
- Broadcast area: Internet
- Headquarters: Mariupol, Ukraine

Programming
- Picture format: 16:9 (Full HD, 1080p)

History
- Launched: 19 July 2014

Links
- Website: priazov.tv

«Public TV of Azov» (Priazov.tv) — an initiative of volunteer journalists of Pryazovia on creating first independent media in the region. It's the third most-popular Internet-channel of Mariupol

Channel's goal is to give Mariupol and Azov region citizens an objective and unprejudiced information on political, economic, social issues. Its task is to fill information space of Azov region by informational and analytical articles and video-stories and to involve Mariupol citizens into process of solution of city problems.

== History ==
=== Creation ===
An idea of creation of an independent public TV-channel for Pryazovia appeared after Mariupol was liberated from DPR occupation. The idea came from Roman Skrypin's Hromadske.TV (Ukrainian - Громадське телебачення, literally - Public television).

Public TV of Azov aired for the first time on July, 19. The first guests were: a priest of the Kyivan patriarchy, the press-secretary of the Azov Battalion, and the organizer of the protests in Vradiyivka.

=== Parliamentary election of 2014 ===
During parliamentary election in 2014 Public TV of Azov hosted debates between candidates from Mariupol. It was the first ever debates in the city history.

=== The city of the heroes ===
In December 2015 Public TV of Azov started project «The city of the heroes» - cycle of documentaries about Mariupol. Cycle was finished in August 2016 and consists of 10 films:

1. Mariupol's self-defense unit
2. From election to election
3. Volunteer day
4. Sector «M»
5. After Minsk
6. Black January
7. First blood
8. The new city power
9. Start life again
10. Ukraine is Mariupol

== See also ==
- Hromadske Radio
- Hromadske.TV
- Public television of Donbas
- Year of freedom. Mariupol after DNR
