= Vyacheslav Voloshyn =

Ukrainian scientist

Vyacheslav Stepanovych Voloshyn
- Born: September 11, 1952 (age 73); Brody, Lviv Oblast, Ukrainian SSR
- Education: Zhdanov Metallurgical Institute
- Known for: Rector of the Pryazovskyi State Technical University

Vyacheslav S. Voloshyn (born September 11, 1952, Brody, Lviv Oblast) is a Ukrainian scientist, Doktor nauk, Professor, head of the Department of Labor Protection and Environmental of the Priazovsky State Technical University, rector of the Pryazovskyi State Technical University since 2003.

== Biography ==
Vyacheslav Voloshyn was born on September 11, 1952. In 1975 he graduated from Zhdanov Metallurgical Institute, and in 1979 he completed a post-graduate course at the same Institute.

Since 1979 he has worked at Pryazovskyi State Technical University (Zhdanov Metallurgical Institute): until 1984 as Junior Researcher, then Assistant (1984–1988); Associate Professor (1988–1990) and Professor (1990–1992), Dean of the Energy Faculty (1992–1994), and since 1994 head of the Department of Labor Protection and Environment and Vice President for Academic Affairs (1995–2003). Since 2003 he has been rector of the Pryazovskyi State Technical University.

== Scientific activity ==
Vyacheslav Voloshyn defended his Ph.D. thesis in 1983 and in 1991 he defended his doctor’s thesis.

His research interests include the environmental safety of industrial regions, environmental protection, protection of coastal zones of the Azov region and the Azov Sea, and radiological safety of the coastal zone. Voloshin was involved in the development of the system of protection against thermal radiation at maintenance of iron and steel units.

On his initiative, the Institute of Ecology of the Sea, at the Academy of Sciences of Higher School of Ukraine and Azov Research Station (Azov research environmental station) were created.

Voloshyn is a member of the specialized Council for Theses Defense of Zaporozhye Industrial Institute. He is the author of more than 160 scientific publications, including three monographs, 120 articles and 39 inventions.

== Honours and awards ==
In 2010 was awarded the order of Yaroslav Mudriy (Prince Yaroslav the wise order).
