= Oleg Morgun =

Ukrainian separatist politician

- Олег Моргун

51st Mayor of Mariupol
- Disputed (Note: Control over Donetsk Oblast is disputed with Vadym Boychenko due to the 2022 Russian invasion of Ukraine. Morgun was installed by Russia on 23 January 2023, while Boychenko remains loyal to the Ukrainian government.)
- Assumed office 23 January 2023
- Appointed by: Denis Pushilin
- Preceded by: Konstantin Ivashchenko

Personal details
- Born: 19 March 1967 (age 59) Sadkivtsi, Vinnytsia Oblast, Ukrainian SSR, Soviet Union

Oleg Valerievich Morgun (Russian: Олег Валерьевич Моргун; born 19 March 1967) is a Russian–Ukrainian pro-Russian politician, collaborator and former police officer serving as the de facto mayor of Mariupol since January 2023.

== Life ==
Morgun is from Vinnytsia where he worked as a police chief. He was the acting head of police of Mariupol from June to July 2014.

He was the de facto head of the Novoazovsk Raion of the Donetsk People's Republic under Alexander Zakharchenko. Morgun was succeeded by Vasily Ovcharov. Morgun was also the head of Yasynuvata.

On January 23, 2023, he was appointed by Denis Pushilin to serve as the de facto mayor of Mariupol. Morgun replaced Konstantin Ivashchenko.
