= Donetsk Regional Committee of the Communist Party of Ukraine =

The Donetsk Regional Committee of the Communist Party of Ukraine, commonly referred to as the Donetsk CPU obkom, was the position of highest authority in the Donetsk Oblast (until November 9, 1961, Stalino Oblast), in the Ukrainian SSR of the Soviet Union. The position was created on July 20, 1932, and abolished in August 1991. The First Secretary was a de facto appointed position usually by the Central Committee of the Communist Party of Ukraine or the First Secretary of the Republic.

== List of First Secretaries of the Communist Party of Donetsk ==
Name	Term of Office		Life years
Name	Start	End	Life years
First Secretaries of the Oblast Committee of the Communist Party
Mykhailo Chuvyrin	July 20, 1932	September 19, 1932	1883–1947
Ivan Akulov	September 19, 1932	September 18, 1933	1888–1937
Sarkis Sarkisov (Danielyan)	September 18, 1933	May 24, 1937	1898–1938
Eduard Pramnek (Pramnieks)	May 24, 1937	April 8, 1938	1899–1938
Aleksandr Shcherbakov	April 8, 1938	November 12, 1938	1901–1945
Petro Lyubavin	November 12, 1938	August 4, 1941	1898–1941
Semen Zadionchenko (Zayonchik)	September 1941	November 1941	1898–1972
Nazi German occupation (1941–1943) (Note: During Nazi German occupation, the region was under Wehrmacht jurisdiction due to the frontlines proximity.)
Mykhailo Drozhzhyn	June 1943	February 16, 1944	1901–?
Leonid Melnykov	February 16, 1944	July 21, 1947	1906–1981
Oleksandr Struyev	July 21, 1947	September 19, 1953	1906–1991
Ivan Kazanets	September 19, 1953	March 1, 1960	1918–2013
Oleksandr Liashko (Note: For Industry January 17, 1963 – July 11, 1963)	March 1, 1960	July 11, 1963	1915–2002
Trokhym Poplyovkin (Note: For Agriculture)	January 16, 1963	December 1964	1915–1977
Volodymyr Dehtyaryov (Note: For Industry to December 1964)	July 11, 1963	January 6, 1976	1920–1993
Borys Kachura	January 10, 1976	October 29, 1982	1930–2007
Vasyl Mironov	October 29, 1982	June 11, 1988	1925–1988
Anatoliy Vinnyk	June 22, 1988	February 9, 1990	1936–
Yevhen Mironov	April 7, 1990	August 1991	1945–

== See also ==
- Donetsk Oblast
- Governor of Donetsk Oblast

== Sources ==
- World Statesmen.org
