= Year of Freedom. Mariupol After DNR =

- Poster of film
- Screenplay by: Ivan Syniepalov
- Directed by: Ivan Syniepalov
- Country of origin: Ukraine
- Original languages: Ukrainian, Russian

Production
- Cinematography: Aykhan Hajibayli
- Editor: Aykhan Hajibayli
- Running time: 13 minutes
- Production company: Public TV of Azov

Original release
- Release: June 13, 2015

Year of Freedom. Mariupol After DNR (Ukrainian: «Рік визволення. Маріуполь після "ДНР"», romanized: Rik vyzvolennia. Mariulol pislia "DNR") is a short documentary produced by Public TV of Azov and released on 13 June 2015 - one year after Mariupol was recaptured by the Ukrainian government from pro-Russian separatist of the so-called Donetsk People's Republic. The film describes the events that took place in the port city of Mariupol in south-eastern Ukraine in the summer of 2014. The story of the liberation of Mariupol on 13 June 2014, is told by participants of the operation - from a regular soldier to the President of Ukraine.

== Cast ==
- Petro Poroshenko - President of Ukraine;
- Andriy Biletsky - chief of Azov Battalion;
- Volodymyr Bohonis - chief of staff of Dnipro-1 Regiment;
- Call sign "Prapor" - soldier of Dnipro-1 Regiment.

== Reception ==
The documentary became one of the most popular videos of Public TV of Azov reaching near 200,000 views. It was awarded as a "Best documentary" at the 2016 film festival "KiTy" (Ukrainian: КіТи). The website "To Inform is to Influence" describes events shown in this documentary as a "proof of the fact that DNR rebels are untrained".

== See also ==
- The City of the Heroes
- Winter that Changed Us
