= Mykhailo Pozhyvanov =

Ukrainian politician (born 1960)

- Михайло Поживанов
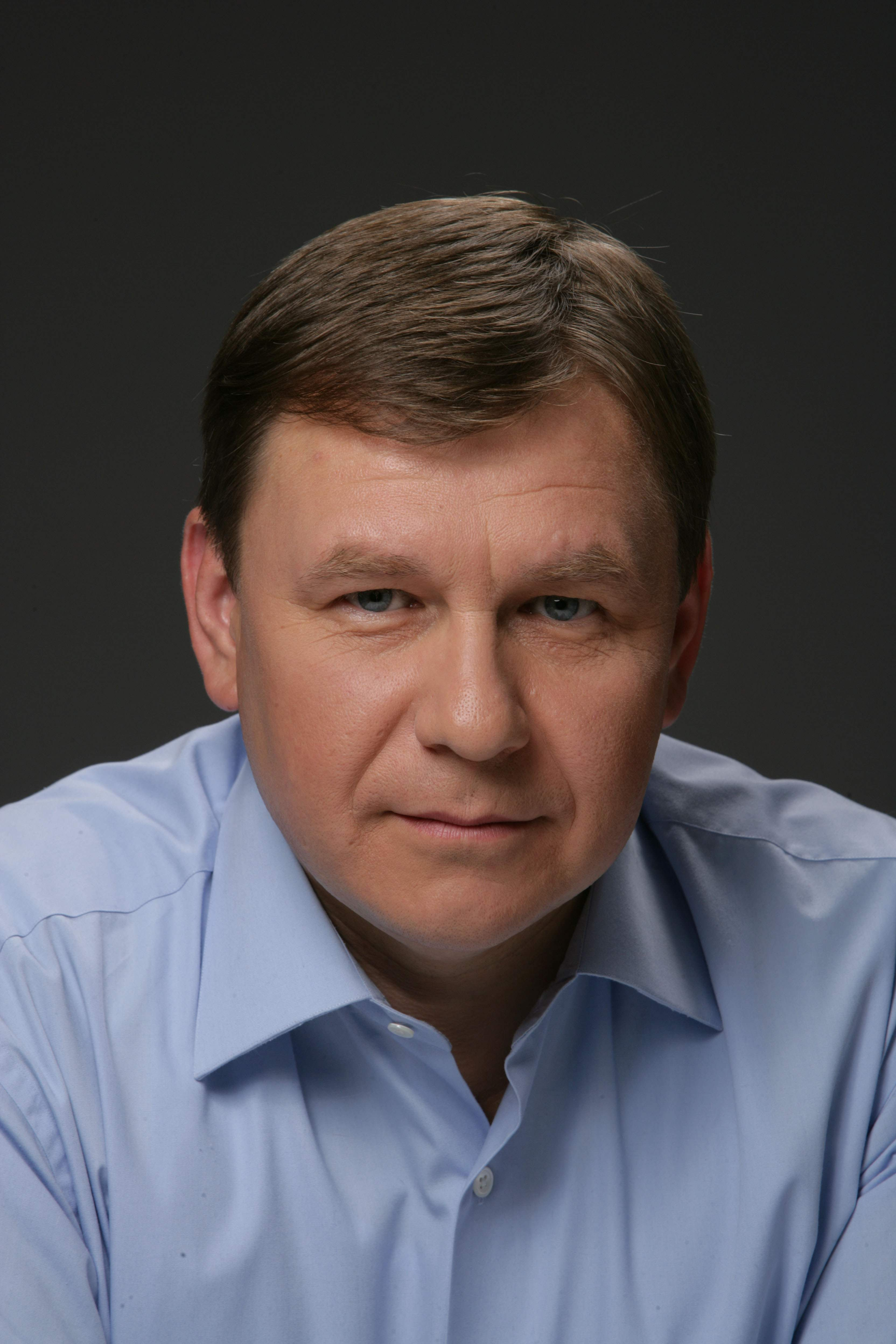
- Pozhyvanov in 2007

Deputy Minister of Economy of Ukraine
- In office 17 December 2008 – March 2010

Member of the Verkhovna Rada
- In office 23 November 2007 – 23 May 2008

Head of the State Reserve Agency of Ukraine
- In office 8 June 2007 – 17 December 2008

Member of the Verkhovna Rada
- In office 5 April 2005 – 8 June 2007

Deputy Chairman of the Kyiv City State Administration
- In office June 2002 – 5 April 2005

1st Mayor of Mariupol
- In office 9 June 1997 – 29 March 1998
- Succeeded by: Yuriy Khotlubei

Member of the Verkhovna Rada
- In office 11 May 1994 – 9 June 1997

Personal details
- Born: Mikhailo Oleksandrovych Pozhyvanov; 12 April 1960 (age 66) Dnipropetrovsk, Ukraine, Soviet Union
- Party: Independent
- Other party: Agrarian Party of Ukraine
- Spouse: Тatiyana Anatoliyivna
- Children: Oleksandr (1987), Valeriy (1989), Serhiy (1996)

Mikhailo Oleksandrovych Pozhyvanov (Ukrainian: Михайло Олександрович Поживанов; born 12 April 1960) is a Ukrainian politician who served as the Deputy Minister of Economy from 2008 to 2010.

Pozhyvanov had also served as a member of the Verkhovna Rada, from 2005 to 2008; having previously served from 1994 to 1997, before officially serving as the first mayor of Mariupol from 1997 to 1998.

He was the head of the NGO "Municipal Reforms Foundation 'Magdeburg Law'" (since 1998). He has a doctorate (Doctor of Technical Sciences) acquired in 1994, and a professor since 1996.

== Biography ==
Mykhailo Pozhyvanov was born in Dnipropetrovsk (present-day Dnipro) on 12 April 1960, to his father, Oleksandr Mikhaylovych (1934-2003), and his mother, Alla Mykolaivna (1937-2011). At the age of 5, he moved with his parents to Lipetsk, where he graduated from high school.

Olkesandr Mikhailovych is a doctor of Technical Sciences, Honored Inventor of the RSFSR, Laureate of the Prize of Ukraine in Science and Technology awarded in 1990. He was the first chairman of the State Committee of Ukraine on Metallurgical Industry.

In 1982, he received a higher technical education as a metallurgical engineer at the Moscow Institute of Steel and Alloys. In 1986, he completed his postgraduate studies there and defended his Ph.D. thesis.

Pozhivanov began his career in 1986, at the Azovstal metallurgical plant in Mariupol. He worked as a steel pourer, foreman, even a shop manager.

From 1991, he managed the small enterprise Azovtechna. And until 1994, he studied at the doctoral program at the Dnipropetrovsk National Metallurgical Academy. There he defended his doctoral dissertation.

By May 1994, Pozhyzanov was first elected as a people's deputy of Ukraine, as well as the head of the city council, holding positions until 1998. At the same time, he headed the Metalurg FC.

As city manager, Pozhyvanov achieved a revision of local budget standards, which in the following year, in 1995, was exceeded by 54%. The city has completely eliminated arrears of wages and pensions. Under his leadership, a blood transfusion station, a children's clinic in the Primorsky district, and a new sewer were built. A major overhaul of utility systems was carried out, a monitoring system for emissions of toxic substances into the atmosphere was introduced, and the Kuindzhi Gallery (now the Mariupol Kuindzhi Art Museum) was restored.

In 1996 and 1997, Pozhyvanov was nominated for the title "Person of the Year" in the "City Mayor" category.

On 9 June 1997, he left the Verkhovna Rada as was officially sworn in as the first mayor of Mariupol.

On 29 March 1998, he left office for his successor, Yuriy Khotlubei, who was elected that year. By the end of the year, Pozhyvanov, with grant support, founded the NGO "Municipal Reforms Fund 'Magdeburg Law'".

In 1999, he worked in the election headquarters of Oleksandr Omelchenko in the elections of the Kyiv mayor. After the latter's victory in August, Pozhyvanov began working at the Kyiv City State Administration (KCSA). First at the position and. O. deputy head, then deputy head of the secretariat.

In 2000, Mikhail Pozhivanov headed the Main Directorate of Foreign Policy Relations and Investments of the Kyiv City State Administration, created on his initiative.

In June 2002, he became deputy city mayor, appointed by Omelchenko. During this period, the program documents of the Kyiv City State Administration on attracting investments were updated and a concept of a system of municipal guarantees to protect the rights of investors was developed.

In 2003, he received a second higher education, and graduated from the National Academy of Internal Affairs of Ukraine when he entered in 2000 with a degree in law.

Pozhyvanov organized and took part in Road Shows in different countries of the world, including in the following cities: New York City, London, Boston, Vienna, Munich, Frankfurt, and Zürich. Through the sale of Eurobonds, Kyiv raised $150 million in 2003, and $200 million in 2004 on loans.

Being responsible for the investment sector of the Kyiv City State Administration, Pozhyvanov led the team that defended the interests of Ukraine in the legal proceedings regarding the claim of Generation Ukraine in the amount of $9 billion. The case was tried in Washington DC, where it was won. For this, Pozhyvanov received Gratitude from the Cabinet of Ministers of Ukraine.

An additional area of foreign economic activity is the stimulation of inbound tourism, especially business, congress and exhibition tourism. To this end, Deputy Mayor Pozhyvanov, together with the Ukrainian tourism business, introduced the practice of a single stand at international tourism events, in particular at the International Tourism Exchange in London "WTM - 2004".

In the first days of the Orange Revolution, Pozhyvanov was the deputy mayor of Kyiv and the head of the city's housing and communal services department, in September 2004, organized round-the-clock cleaning of Maidan Nezalezhnosti by public utilities. Each district of the capital sent 30 janitors every day.

In 2005, Pozhyvanov became a member of the Verkhovna Rada again. He was also elected in 2006 and 2007. On 29 December 2007, he was appointed head of the State Reserve of Ukraine.

On 17 December 2008, he became the Deputy Minister of Economy.

In March 2010, Mikhail Pozhivanov was fired from a government position in connection with the resignation of the government of Yulia Tymoshenko.

In June, he was treated at the Austrian clinic Rudolfinerhaus, where he met the head of the development company EYEMAXX AG and received a business offer. In 6 September 2010, Pozhyvanov has a work and residence permit in Austria. Soon he signs a contract for 5 years.

On 31 January 2011, the SBU opened a criminal case against Pozhyvanov and announced a search warrant. Investigators charged the former head of the State Reserve with embezzlement of UAH 35 million. This became one of the components of political persecution during Yanukovych's presidency, which manifested itself in the initiation of criminal cases against members of Tymoshenko's government.

Pozhyvanov provided his contacts in writing to the Prosecutor General and the head of the SBU. However, there was no interaction with investigators until 2014.

According to Pozhivanov, the case was the revenge of the Donetsk people for his activities as the mayor of Mariupol. Journalist Sonya Koshkina considered the actions of the authorities to be a typical raid, which sought to seize Pozhyvanov's assets while he was abroad and unable to respond.

In 2012, the investigation was terminated, which coincided with the resignation of the head of the SBU, Valeriy Khoroshkovsky. Official reason: unknown whereabouts of Mikhail Pozhyzanov. Although the security forces and the media knew the coordinates of the politician and his willingness to testify.

On 27 January 2014, at the height of the Revolution of Dignity, the criminal proceedings against Pozhivanov were closed. Later, an investigator came to Vienna, to whom Pozhyvanov testified for 6 hours. The charges were finally dismissed and the case dismissed as unlawfully initiated. On 20 Marc 2014, Mykhailo Oleksandrovych informed journalists about his return to Ukraine.

That same year, he took part in open competitions for the post of deputy minister in the Ministry of Regional Development and Ministry of Ecology. Both competition commissions approved Pozhivanov's candidacy. But the minister of the Ministry of Regional Development refused to recommend the candidate for approval. Mykhailo Pozhivanov himself refused to work at Minekology after learning about the opaque arrangements.

In 2017, Pozhyvanov became a member of the Agrarian Party of Ukraine. On December 17, 2017, at the XIII Party Congress, he was elected to the Presidium of the Political Council.

In 2019, he left the Agrarian Party of Ukraine.

He was a candidate for People's Deputies from the "Strength and Honor" party in the 2019 parliamentary elections, No. 11 on the list, but ultimately didn't get elected.

He is currently an independent.

== Legislative activity ==
Poszyvanov participated in the development of the text of the Constitution of Ukraine of the 1996 edition, working in the deputy group responsible for the project of Chapter 11 "Local Self-Government". Pozhyvanov advocated the implementation of the norms of the "European Charter on Local Self-Government" (not yet ratified) in the draft Constitution. Including the abolition of vertical subordination of councils, including regional and district councils. He also advocated the right of local self-government bodies to dispose of part of the collected taxes and not to give everything to the state budget.

Together with Olsksandr Lavrinovich, Pozhyvanov proposed about 800 amendments to the draft law "On Local Self-Government" in 1997.

== Scientific activity ==
Pozhyvanov received his first copyright certificate for his invention in his fourth year of study at MISiS. Now, inventions created with his participation are used in various countries: Germany, China, North Macedonia, and others.

In 1986, he defended his thesis for Candidate of Technical Sciences. He continued his practical experiments at the Azovstal metallurgical plant. In 1994 he defended his doctoral dissertation "Development of theoretical foundations and complex technology for producing especially pure high-quality converter steel for thick sheets".

Although Pozhyvanov became one of the youngest doctors of science in the CIS, due to the crisis of scientific institutions, he changed his priorities in the early 1990s and went into politics.

Whenever possible, he continued scientific research. As the mayor of Mariupol, he took up environmental issues, in particular the topic of waste in the city. One of the books on this issue, "Disaster Can Be Abolished," was translated into English.

On a voluntary basis, Pozhyvanov continued to work on issues of metallurgy. In particular, he worked as a leading senior researcher at the Physico-Technological Institute of Metals and Alloys of the National Academy of Sciences of Ukraine.].

== Personal life ==
He is fluent in Ukrainian, English, Russian and German.

His hobbies include tennis, football, basketball, swimming, skiing, collecting and drawing pictures, and books.

=== Family ===
He is married to his wife, Тatiyana Anatoliyivna (born 1963), and has three sons, Oleksandr (born 1987), Valeriy (1989), Serhiy (1996).
