= Vadym Boychenko =

Ukrainian politician

- Вадим Бойченко
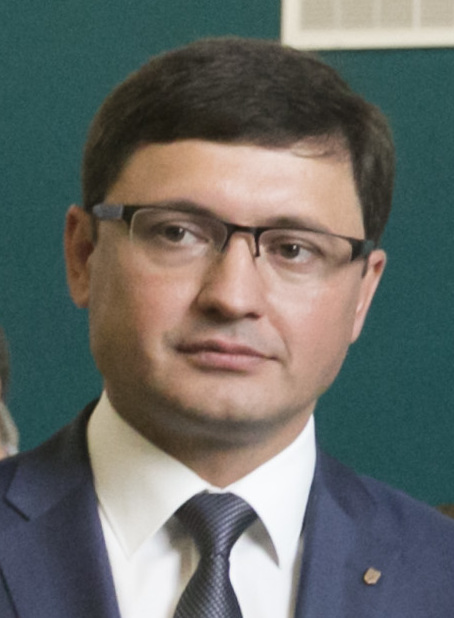
- Boychenko in August 2016

3rd Mayor of Mariupol
- Disputed (Note: Control over Donetsk Oblast is disputed with Oleg Morgun due to the 2022 Russian invasion of Ukraine. Morgun was installed by Russia on 23 January 2023, while Boychenko remains loyal to the Ukrainian government. Konstantin Ivashchenko served as Morgun's predecessor from 6 April 2022.)
- Assumed office 15 December 2015
- Preceded by: Yuriy Khotlubei

Personal details
- Born: 5 June 1977 (age 49) Zhdanov, Ukrainian SSR, Soviet Union (Note: Mariupol is claimed by both Russia and Ukraine. As of June 2026, Russia controls the city but is internationally recognized as being part of Ukraine.)
- Party: Vadym Boychenko Bloc
- Education: Priazov State Technical University; Donetsk National University
- Profession: Politician
- Website: https://t.me/VadymBoichenko

Vadym Serhiyovych Boychenko (Ukrainian: Вадим Сергійович Бойченко; born 5 June 1977) is a Ukrainian politician who serves as the de jure mayor of Mariupol in Donetsk Oblast, Ukraine since 2015. Boychenko served as mayor during the 2022 Russian invasion of Ukraine and Siege of Mariupol though not inside the city, during which the city has been "completely destroyed", according to President Volodymyr Zelenskyy.

== Early life ==
Boychenko was born in Mariupol on 5 June 1977. He is a graduate of both the Priazov State Technical University and the Donetsk National University. He began employment at the Azovstal Iron and Steel Works as a locomotive engineer in 2005, going on to become Deputy Head of Transportation before leaving the company in 2010. He then held management positions at Metinvest and another steelworks company until his election as mayor in 2015.

== Mayor of Mariupol ==
In 2013–2015, Boychenko was a member of the executive committee of the Mariupol City Council.

Boychenko was elected mayor of Mariupol on 15 December 2015. He was elected as a non-partisan self-nominated candidate with 69% of the vote.

Boychenko unsuccessfully took part in the 2019 Ukrainian parliamentary election for the Opposition Bloc party, No. 5 on the list as a non-partisan. The party won six single-seat constituencies, but its nationwide list only won 3.23% of the votes, failing to overcome the 5% election barrier.

Boychenko was re-elected for a second term in October 2020. He was a candidate for the Vadym Boychenko Bloc.

== Siege of Mariupol ==
When Russian forces launched their full-scale invasion of Ukraine in 2022, Mariupol quickly became one of the most devastated cities in the conflict. As the siege intensified, Boychenko was forced to leave the city for his safety. From outside the encircled city, working from places like Dnipro and Zaporizhzhia, he became one of the key voices sharing what was happening inside Mariupol. Boychenko gave regular updates to journalists and international organizations, describing the worsening humanitarian crisis—people trapped without food, water, or electricity, and neighborhoods reduced to rubble. His reports helped bring global attention to the suffering of Mariupol's residents and the scale of the destruction caused by the siege.

In an interview in May 2022, Boychenko looked back at the early days of the invasion and the city's response. He mentioned how even one day prior to the invasion, he did not have other information available and believed that an invasion would not occur. He then discussed various topics relating to the war, including the coordination efforts following the beginning of invasion, the shortage of bomb shelters, his own family's war story, and how he is continuing to support the people of Mariupol in exile.

== See also ==
- List of mayors of Mariupol
