= Natalia Kharakoz =

Ukrainian journalist and writer (1935–2022)

- Наталія Харакоз
- Born: Natalia Georgiivna Kharakoz; 13 July 1935; Mariupol, Ukrainian SSR, Soviet Union
- Died: 29 March 2022 (aged 86); Mariupol, Ukraine
- Education: Zhdanov Metallurgical Institute
- Occupations: Journalist; writer
- Awards: Medal "Veteran of Labour"

Natalia Georgiivna Kharakoz (Ukrainian: Наталія Георгіївна Харакоз; 13 July 1935 – 29 March 2022) was a Ukrainian journalist and writer. She became a member of the National Union of Journalists of Ukraine (NUJU) in 1971 and, in 1998, made history as the first woman from Mariupol to join the National Writers' Union of Ukraine (NSPU).

== Early life and education ==
Kharakoz was born on 13 July 1935 in Mariupol to a Greek family. In 1959, she graduated from the Zhdanov Metallurgical Institute, now known as Pryazovskyi State Technical University.

== Career ==
Kharakoz began her career working as a designer at an industrial plant before joining the editorial office of the Mariupol city newspaper Pryazovskyi Robochyi in 1967. Over the years, she served as a literary contributor, head of the letters department from 1970 to 1979, columnist from 1980, and from 2001, led the Azovie Literary Club affiliated with the newspaper. She guided and supported aspiring authors from Mariupol, playing a key role in their early creative development. For nearly three decades, she remained the driving force behind the club. A committed literary figure, Kharakoz was a member of both the NUJU and, since 1998, the first Mariupol native to join the NSPU.

Kharakoz's literary works—published in Ukraine, Greece, Georgia, Russia, and the United States—encompassed essays, short stories, novellas, lyrical miniatures, and sketches. Greek themes featured prominently in her writing, and some of her works were written in Greek. Her prose often portrayed lyrical, gentle female characters—poetic and empathetic heroines who reflected her nuanced storytelling. Among the literary and artistic collections she edited and compiled are Mariupol in the Constellation of Lyra (1994–2013), My Hellas–Ukraine (1998), We Are from Azov (1999), Debut (2001), and Revelations (2009). Her book Novellas of the Azov Coast was published in Kyiv in 2022.

Kharakoz's final work, In the Line of Collision, was a collaborative collection released just days before the full-scale Russian invasion, on 20 February 2022. It featured her contributions alongside other authors from the Donetsk regional branch of the NSPU. Included in the volume were her works Spring of the Sea and the Cityand The Cloud of the Sea. Deeply engaged in civic life, Kharakoz founded the Mriya Women's Club, served on the city’s women's council, and was a jury member for the Federation of Greek Societies of Ukraine's All-Ukrainian school Olympiads.

== Death ==
Reflecting on Kharakoz's unwavering commitment to her craft during the siege of Mariupol, her relative and fellow writer from the city, Anna Kotykhova, recalled how Kharakoz continued writing despite the worsening conditions. She sent Kotykhova her manuscripts by email, accompanied by urgent pleas to preserve them before she lost internet access. Kotykhova expressed concern that, even if the digital files survived, none of Kharakoz's printed books may have. On 29 March 2022, Kharakoz died after her home was set on fire by Russian shelling. Seeking shelter in her basement, she died when the structure collapsed. Communication breakdowns and the chaos of the siege meant that her family only learned of her fate in early April through neighbours; her body was not found until May.

According to her granddaughter, Kharakoz had survived underground for more than ten days with the help of neighbours who shared food. However, the lack of access to essential medicine may have contributed to her death. Her body was later identified after a neighbour, before burying her, placed a note with her name in her pocket. She was eventually reburied in the Old Crimean Cemetery. The National Police of Ukraine are investigating her death under Part 2 of Article 438 of the Criminal Code—"Violation of the laws and customs of war." Her case is one of 17 ongoing investigations into the deaths of journalists killed either in the line of duty or as civilians during Russia’s full-scale invasion.

== Legacy ==
In the now-occupied settlement of Sartana, Kharakoz's legacy as a prominent figure of Greek heritage was commemorated at the Museum of the History and Ethnography of the Greeks of the Azov Region. In 2024, she was posthumously honoured at the Women in Arts award ceremony, which recognised artists who lost their lives due to the Russian invasion. Kharakoz was celebrated for her lasting contributions to Ukrainian literature and culture, and her name was added to the list of women who perished during the conflict.

"For nearly two decades, she was the only woman in Mariupol who belonged to the Writers' Union of Ukraine," recalled her colleague, Pavlo Kushch. "I used to say she was the only female writer from Mariupol, but she worked harder than most men. She had incredible energy. She was the heart of the local writers' association and was always the one people turned to for advice on emerging authors. She could immediately spot promising talent. I believe many young writers are grateful to her for the support she offered and the path she helped pave for them in literature."

Olena Kalaitan, head of the Donetsk regional branch of the National Union of Journalists of Ukraine and editor-in-chief of Pryazovskyi Robochyi, also described Kharakoz as a veteran journalist and a long-standing union member. One of the few surviving pieces of her literary legacy is Novels of the Azov Coast, a collection of memoirs about Mariupol, published by her granddaughter, Anna Prokopenko. Based on digital manuscripts that Kharakoz had managed to pass on to her relatives before her death, only 100 copies of the book were printed and exhibited in Kyiv. Most of her printed works—once held in libraries and museums—were destroyed during the war, making this collection a rare and invaluable testament to her life and work.

== Awards ==
Kharakoz has been awarded the following awards and honours:

- Gold Medal of Ukrainian Journalism
- Honorary Award of the NSPU
- Medal "Veteran of Labour"
