= Volodymyr Boyko =

Ukrainian entrepreneur and politician (1938–2015)

Hero of Ukraine Volodymyr Boyko
- Володимир Бойко
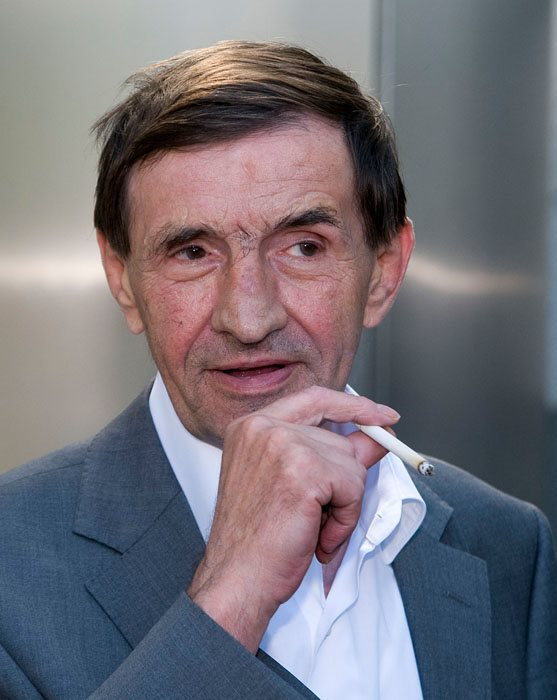
- Boyko in 2009

People's Deputy of Ukraine
- In office 12 December 2012 – 27 November 2014
- In office 14 May 2002 – 23 November 2007

Personal details
- Born: 20 September 1938 Mariupol, Ukrainian SSR, Soviet Union (now Ukraine)
- Died: 10 June 2015 (aged 76) Mariupol, Donetsk Oblast, Ukraine
- Party: Party of Regions; Socialist Party of Ukraine
- Spouse: Claudia Alexandrovna
- Children: 1
- Education: Mariupol Metallurgical Institute
- Occupation: Entrepreneur; metallurgist; politician
- Awards: Hero of Ukraine

Military service
- Allegiance: Soviet Union
- Branch/service: Soviet Army
- Years of service: 1957–1960
- Rank: Junior sergeant

Volodymyr Semenovych Boyko (Ukrainian: Володи́мир Семе́нович Бо́йко; 20 August 1938 – 10 June 2015) was a Ukrainian metallurgist, entrepreneur, and politician who is a recipient of the Hero of Ukraine and Order of Merit. Additionally, he was a member of the Ukrainian Verkhovna Rada from 2002 to 2007 and 2012 to 2014.

== Early life and education ==
Born on 20 August 1938, in the Ukrainian city of Mariupol. Sadki was the place where Boyko was raised. Tatiana Vladimirovna, his future daughter, was born in a home that his parents had constructed. Boyko stated that his first ambition was to become a sailor. He applied to the maritime school and was enrolled in the Soviet Navy in 1953, having completed seven classes at the No. 44 school. He later received his diploma from the Mariupol Metallurgical Institute in 1970.

== Career ==
Boyko was first employed as a pipeline worker in the Zhdanov Metallurgical Plant's water supply shop from 1955 to 1960. This plant was eventually renamed the Illich Steel and Iron Works of Mariupol. Following that, he worked on the fishing trawler RT-142 trawlflot in the fleet Glavmurmanrybprom and as a plumbing technician in the Stalinshakhtostroy building unit. During this time from 1957 to 1960, he also served in the ranks of the Soviet Armed Forces. He was conscripted into the Soviet Army, and was stationed in the Leningrad Military District. In 1960, he was demobilized as a junior sergeant and team leader.

Boyko went from working as a cold metal carving in 1960 to being a supervisor at the metal rolling business in 1971. Later, he rose to the rank of senior master in the same business. After that, he worked as the special production department's deputy director for manufacturing and administration before taking over as head of the sheet rolling business. He served as the company's deputy head and acting head of the Production and Administrative Department from 1983 until 1990. After that, he was named deputy director of the plant for production and supply of products and took over as head of the Production and Administrative Department.

Boyko was the general director of Illich Steel and Iron Works from 1990 until 1997. He became the general director and chairman of the board of the company after it was corporatized in 1997. Furthermore, he served as a freelance advisor to President Leonid Kravchuk from 1993 to 1994. He took the helm while both the nation and its economy suffered a collapse. He not only prevented the company from going bankrupt, but also elevated it to the top of the national metallurgical landscape.

== Political career ==
Between 1994 and 2002, Boyko held a seat as a deputy of the Donetsk Oblast Council for two terms, while concurrently participating in the Council of Exporters under the Cabinet of Ministers of Ukraine and the Coordinating Council on Internal Policy. In 1994, he backed Leonid Kuchma as a representative of the Red Directorate in the presidential race. According to Vladimir Semyonov, he never pursued a career in politics. However, President Kuchma persuaded him to visit the legislature. From 2002 to 2007, he served as a People's Deputy of Ukraine, initially representing the bloc For United Ukraine! and later the Socialist Party, contributing notably to committees focused on industrial and regulatory policy within the Verkhovna Rada.

Boyko's political allegiances changed as time passed. He had been a member of many groups, such as United Ukraine and European Choice, before temporarily joining the Party of Regions in November 2003 and staying there until September 2005. Subsequently, he forged partnerships with lawmakers from the Socialist Party, ultimately emerging as a key supporter of the party. From 2006 to 2007, he served as the Socialist Party's People's Deputy of Ukraine for the 5th convocation and made contributions to the committee on Industrial and Regulatory Policy and Entrepreneurship.

== Philanthropy ==
Citizens in Ukraine received no wages as companies closed one before another; the Illich Steel and Iron Works saw success back then, Boyko provided employment for many Mariupol locals. In addition, he funded football clubs and watered their pitches, boxing matches and football fields, and he rebuilt educational institutions, preschools, healthcare facilities, police departments, tribunals, and the attorney's office. He also funded parks, highways, and airports.

Boyko mentored the football team Metalurh (now FC Mariupol) in the late 1990s, and the team set a lofty objective for itself: to join the Ukrainian Premier League. His efforts paid off, as the squad was given access to one of the greatest seaside training bases in Ukraine at the time. The city got the biggest indoor sporting facility in Ukraine in 2001. The Western stadium, where the Ukraine women's national football team played in the successful Euro 2009, was constructed. The Illichivets Stadium (now Volodymyr Boyko Stadium), which hosted UEFA Cup matches, was reconstructed.

== Personal life ==
Boyko was married to Claudia Alexandrovna, and together they have a daughter, Tatiana Vladimirovna Potapova. He and his family resided in an unusually simple house.

Boyko placed sixth on the list of 130 richest Ukrainians with a fortune of $3.15 billion, according to Fokus magazine's evaluation, which was published in March 2008. Furthermore, as the article points out, he only had $1.3 billion in the start of 2007.

After an extended sickness, Boyko passed away on 10 June 2015, at the age of 76. Boyko's farewell for Mariupol locals took place in the Karl Marx Palace of Culture on Friday, 12 June from 9:00 to 14:00.

== Awards and recognitions ==
Boyko received the gold medal from the WIPO Academy in 2006 in recognition of his exceptional contribution to the growth of creative endeavors in Ukraine. He ranked 45th on the Top 100 list of the most powerful individuals in Ukraine published in 2006 by the magazine De Correspondent, and he held the 61st position of the 200 most influential Ukrainians listing in the 2007 Fokus magazine assessment. The state bestowed upon him the most prestigious title, that of Hero of Ukraine, for his achievements, becoming the first and only awardee from Mariupol. A commemorative Bronze bust honoring him was unveiled on the exterior of the Pryazovskyi State Technical University's first building in Mariupol on 21 October 2017.

He has received awards and recognitions such as:

- Hero of Ukraine Order of the State (18 July 2003)
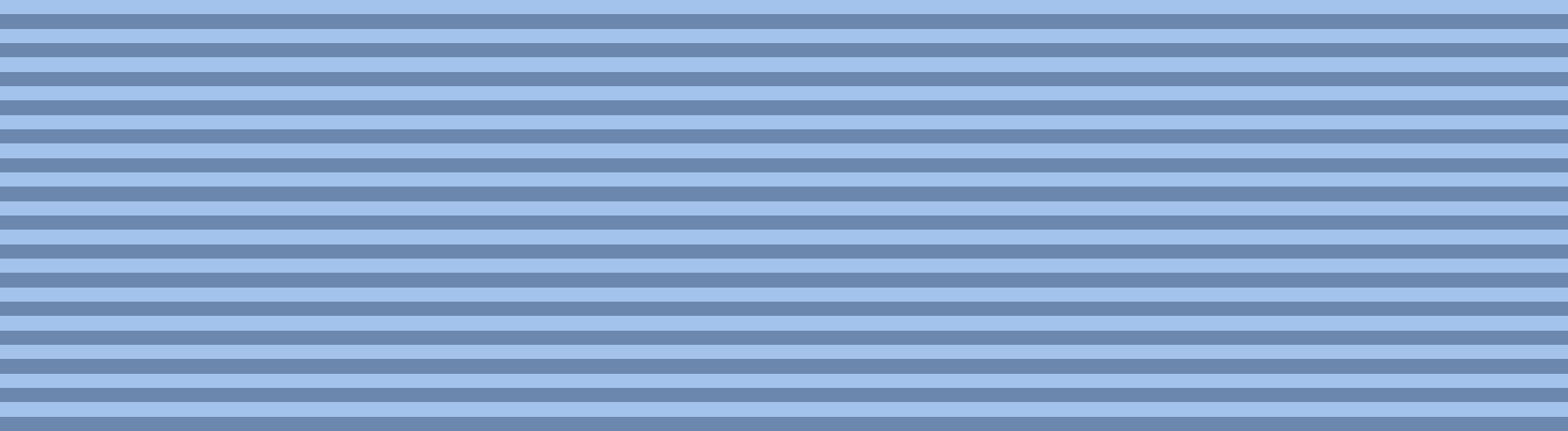
- Order of Prince Yaroslav the Wise Fifth Class (24 August 2013)
- Order of Merit First Class (27 April 2001)
- Order of Merit Second Class (19 September 1998)
- Order of Merit Third Class (7 February 1997)
- Order of Danylo Halytsky (19 August 2006)
- Order of the Badge of Honour (1974)
- Honored Metallurgist of Ukraine (17 July 1995)
- State Prize of Ukraine in Science and Technology (1 December 1999)
- Named for Volodymyr Boyko Stadium (2018)
- Honorary President of the FC Mariupol
- Honorary Citizen of Mariupol (1998)
- Honorary Citizen of the Krasnohvardiiske Raion
