= Igor Khakimzyanov =

Russian militia commander

Igor Kakidzyanov
- Игорь Какидзянов
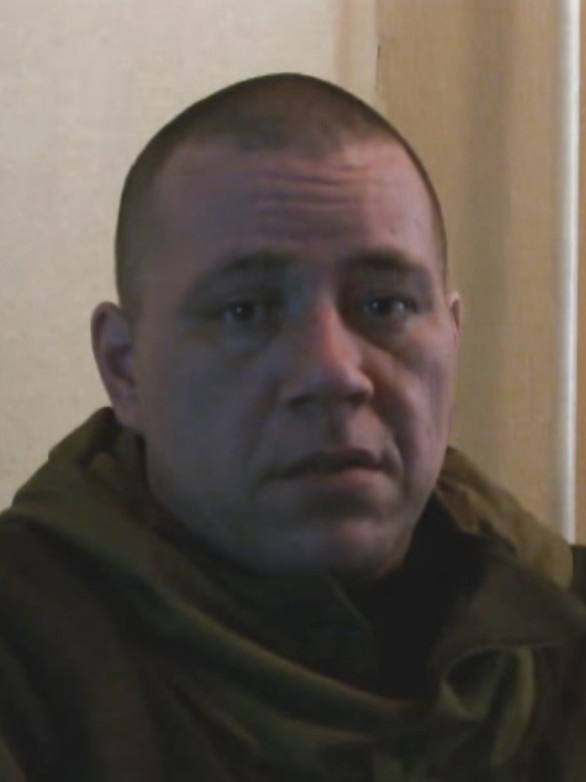
- Kakidzyanov in 2015
- Born: 25 July 1980 (age 46); Makiivka, Ukrainian SSR, Soviet Union
- Military career
- Allegiance: Donetsk People's Republic
- Branch: Donbass People's Militia
- Rank: Commander of the People's Army
- Conflicts: War in Donbas

Igor Yevgenyevich Kakidzyanov (Russian: Игорь Евгеньевич Какидзянов; born 25 July 1980) is a former Defense Minister of the self-proclaimed Donetsk People's Republic (DPR). He was Commander-in-Chief of Popular Army, until captured by pro-Ukrainian paramilitaries on 7 May 2014.

After the exchange of prisoners, he returned to the DPR and was active in military and politics.

In 2018, there was a bomb attack on him and his party, where three people were injured, including Kakidzyanov.

== Sanctions ==
Kakidzyanov was sanctioned by the UK government in 2014 in relation to the Russo-Ukrainian war.
