= Kalmiuskyi District =

Kalmiuskyi District Кальміуський район
- Urban district
- Interactive map of Kalmiuskyi District
- Country: Ukraine
- Oblast: Donetsk Oblast

Area
  - Total: 138.729 km^{2} (53.564 sq mi)

Population
  - Total: 118,064
- Time zone: UTC+2 (EET)
  - Summer (DST): UTC+3 (EEST)

Kalmiuskyi District (Ukrainian: Кальміуський район), formerly known as Illichivskyi District, is an urban district of the city of Mariupol, Ukraine.

In 2016, it was renamed to its current name to comply with decommunization laws.

== Demographics ==
According to the 2001 census, the district's population was 102,946, of whom 6.03% spoke Ukrainian, 93.60% Russian, 0.07% Armenian, 0.06% Greek, 0.04% Belarusian, 0.03% - Romani, 0.01% - Moldovan (Romanian), Jewish, Bulgarian, German and Romanian (self-declared).
