= Borys Kachura =

Ukrainian politician (1930-2007)

- Борис Качура
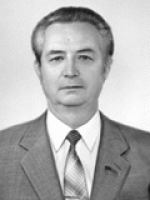

People's Deputy of the Verkhovna Rada
- In office 15 May 1990 – 10 May 1994
- Constituency: Chuhuiv electoral district No. 382

1st Secretary of the Donetsk Regional Committee of the Communist Party of Ukraine
- In office 10 January 1976 – 29 October 1982
- Preceded by: Volodymyr Dehtyaryov
- Succeeded by: Vasyl Mironov

1st Secretary of the Zhdanov City Committee
- In office 1968–1974
- Preceded by: Volodymyr Tsybulko
- Succeeded by: Volodymyr Zharkov

Deputy to the Supreme Soviet of the Soviet Union
- In office 1979–1989

Personal details
- Born: Borys Vasylovych Kachura; 1 September 1930 Tulchyn, Ukrainian SSR, Soviet Union
- Died: 4 September 2007 (aged 77) Kyiv, Ukraine
- Party: CPSU
- Education: Kharkiv Polytechnic Institute
- Occupation: Politician

Borys Vasylovych Kachura (Ukrainian: Борис Васильович Качура: 1 September 1930 - 4 September 2007) was a Ukrainian politician and engineer who served as the Member of the Verkhovna Rada from 1990 to 1994.

== Early life ==
Kachura was born on 1 September 1930 in Tulchyn, which was then part of the Ukrainian SSR in the Soviet Union, into a family of employees. He first worked on a collective farm in Aktobe, before graduating from the Kharkiv Polytechnic Institute in 1954. After graduating, he moved to Donetsk Oblast, and progressed from a master to a shop chief at the Illich Steel and Iron Works, located within Mariupol (then Zhdanov). In 1958 he was appointed chief of the steam-power shop then deputy chief power engineer at the Zhdanov Heavy Machine-Building Plant.

== Political career ==
In 1963, he entered politics, becoming 2nd Secretary of the Zhdanov City Committee, and then as Head of the Zhdanov City Executive Committee. He was then appointed 1st Secretary of the Zhdanov City Committee. After entering the broader politics for Donetsk Oblast, he transitioned from 2nd Secretary to 1st Secretary of the Donetsk Regional Committee of the Communist Party of Ukraine from 1976 to 1982.

In 1982, he was appointed as Secretary of the Central Committee of the Communist Party of Ukraine. He was then a Deputy to the Supreme Soviet of the USSR in its 10th and 11th convocations, and also was a Deputy of the Supreme Soviet of the Ukrainian SSR in its VIII, IX, and XI convocations.

On 3 April 1990, Kachura was elected a member of parliament, a People's Deputy of Ukraine of the Verkhovna Rada in the 1st round, with 53.42% of the votes, and 7 applicants. He was elected to Chuhuiv electoral district No. 382 (within Kharkiv Oblast) as a non-aligned member.

== Personal life ==
Kachura died in Kyiv on 4 September 2007.

He was married with two children.
