= Pryazovskyi State Technical University =

Ukrainian university in Mariupol

- Приазовський державний технічний університет
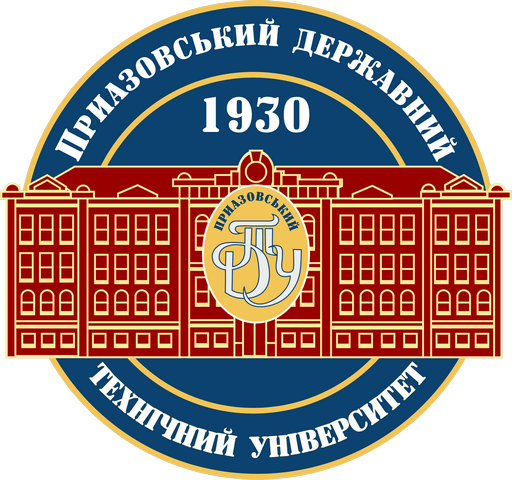
- Established: 1930
- Affiliations: Ministry of Education and Science of Ukraine
- Rector: Olena Khadzhynova
- Students: 2500
- Location: (de facto) Gogolia St., 29, aud. 314, Dnipro, 49000, Ukraine; 48°27′19″N 35°03′07″E
- Website: pstu.edu
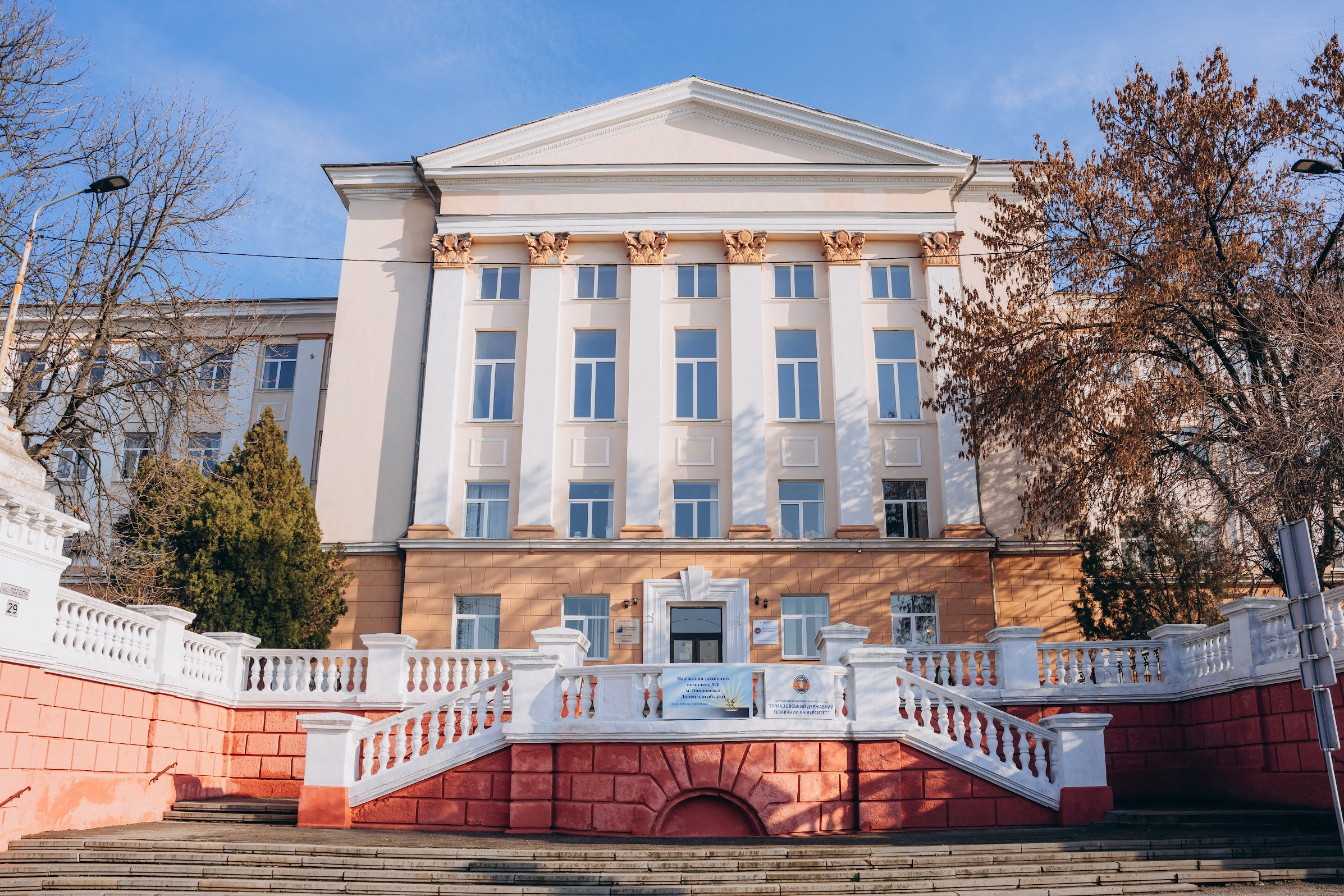

The Pryazovskyi State Technical University (abbr. PSTU, Ukrainian: Приазовський державний технічний університет) is a higher education institution in Ukraine, accredited at the fourth level. It is one of the oldest universities in the Donetsk Region.

Before the full-scale Russian invasion of Ukraine, PSTU was located in Mariupol and was one of the largest higher education institutions in the Pryazovia region.

In March 2022, the university's Building 5 was struck by two heavy enemy aerial bombs, followed by additional hits that damaged other buildings, some completely destroyed. By order of the Ministry of Education and Science of Ukraine dated April 13, 2022, No. 334, the university was relocated to the city of Dnipro, where it resumed operations in the facilities of the Dnipro Polytechnic.

Currently, PSTU conducts its educational process in a distance format using modern digital technologies. The university is expanding its network of domestic and international partners and implementing programs of international academic mobility for students.

== Structure ==
- Educational and Scientific Institute of Modern Technologies
- Educational and Scientific Institute of Economics and Management
- Institute of Advanced Training
- Faculty of Transport Technologies
- Faculty of Information Technologies
- Mechanical Engineering Faculty
- Social and Humanitarian Faculty
- Faculty of Engineering and Language Training for Foreign Citizens

Additionally, the university includes three separate structural subdivisions: "Mariupol Professional College," "Mariupol Mechanical Engineering College," and "Mariupol Polytechnic Professional College."

== Levels of training ==
Pryazovskyi State Technical University provides training for students in 28 programs at the first (bachelor's) level, 35 programs at the second (master's) level, and 9 programs at the third (educational and scientific) level.

The educational process is supported by 176 faculty members, including 106 candidates of sciences and 28 doctors of sciences.

== History ==
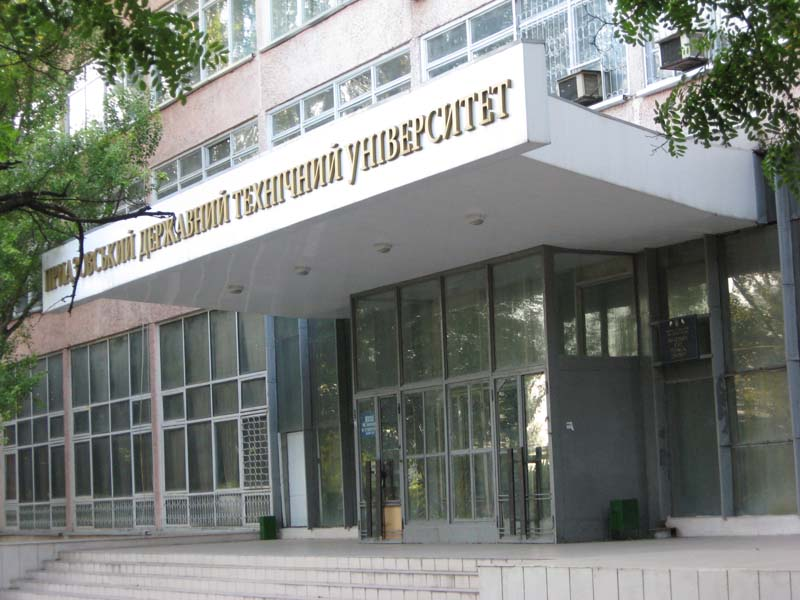

- 1930: Established as Mariupol Evening Metallurgical Institute, based on the Evening Workers' Metallurgical Technical School, offering training in five specialties.
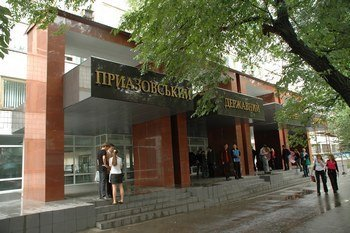
- 1939: Introduced full-time education, training specialists in areas such as steelmaking, rolling production, metallurgy, and thermal treatment of ferrous and non-ferrous metals.
- 1941-1943: Activities suspended during World War II; resumed in December 1943.
- 1948-1989: Known as Zhdanov Metallurgical Institute.
- 1990: Achieved the highest (IV) level of accreditation.
- 1993: Reorganized into Pryazovskyi State Technical University.

In 2022, due to the Russian invasion of Ukraine and the Siege of Mariupol some of the university's buildings were destroyed. PSTU was temporarily relocated to the city of Dnipro.

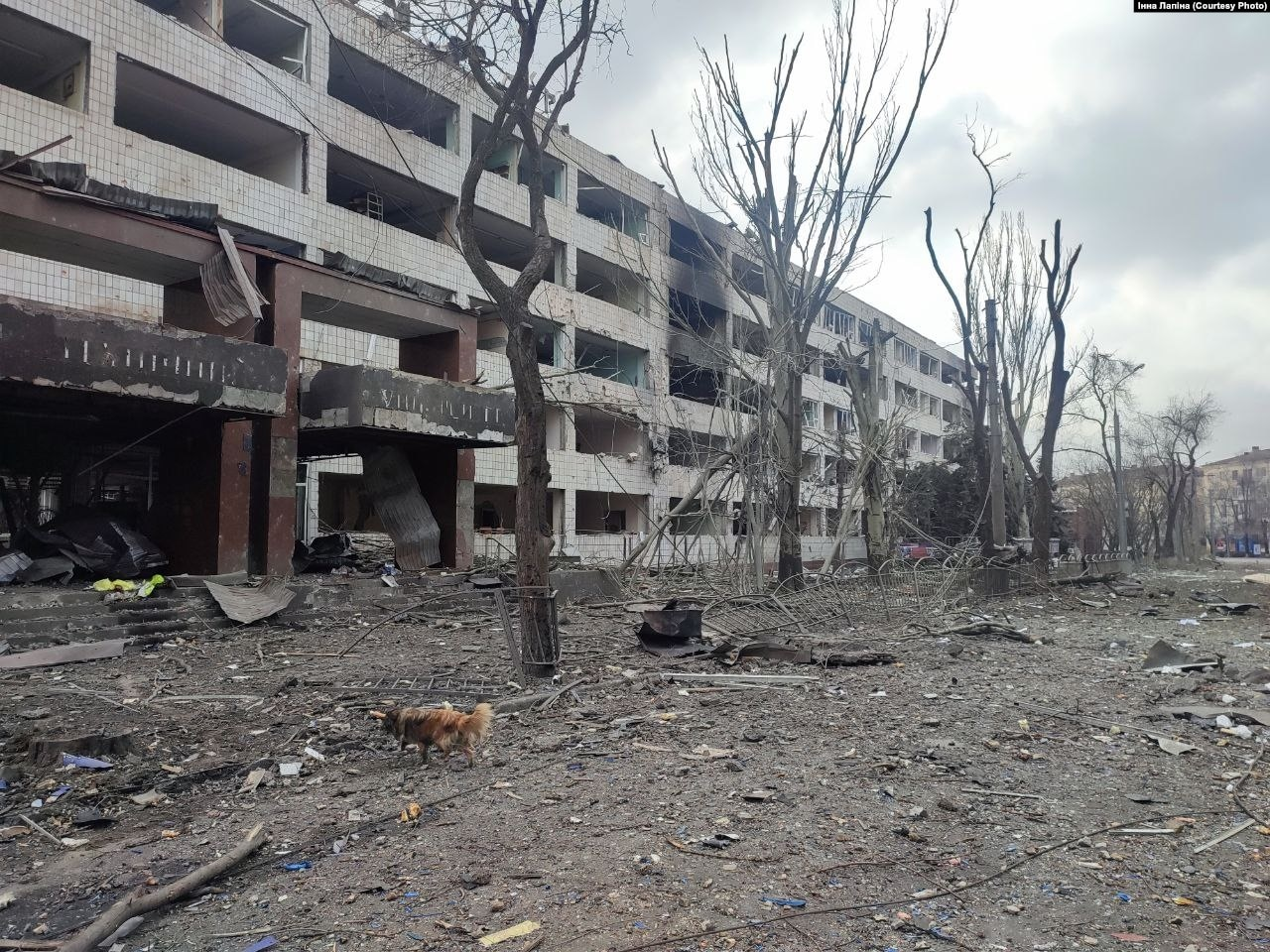
In 2022, due to the Russian invasion of Ukraine and the Siege of Mariupol some of the university's buildings were destroyed

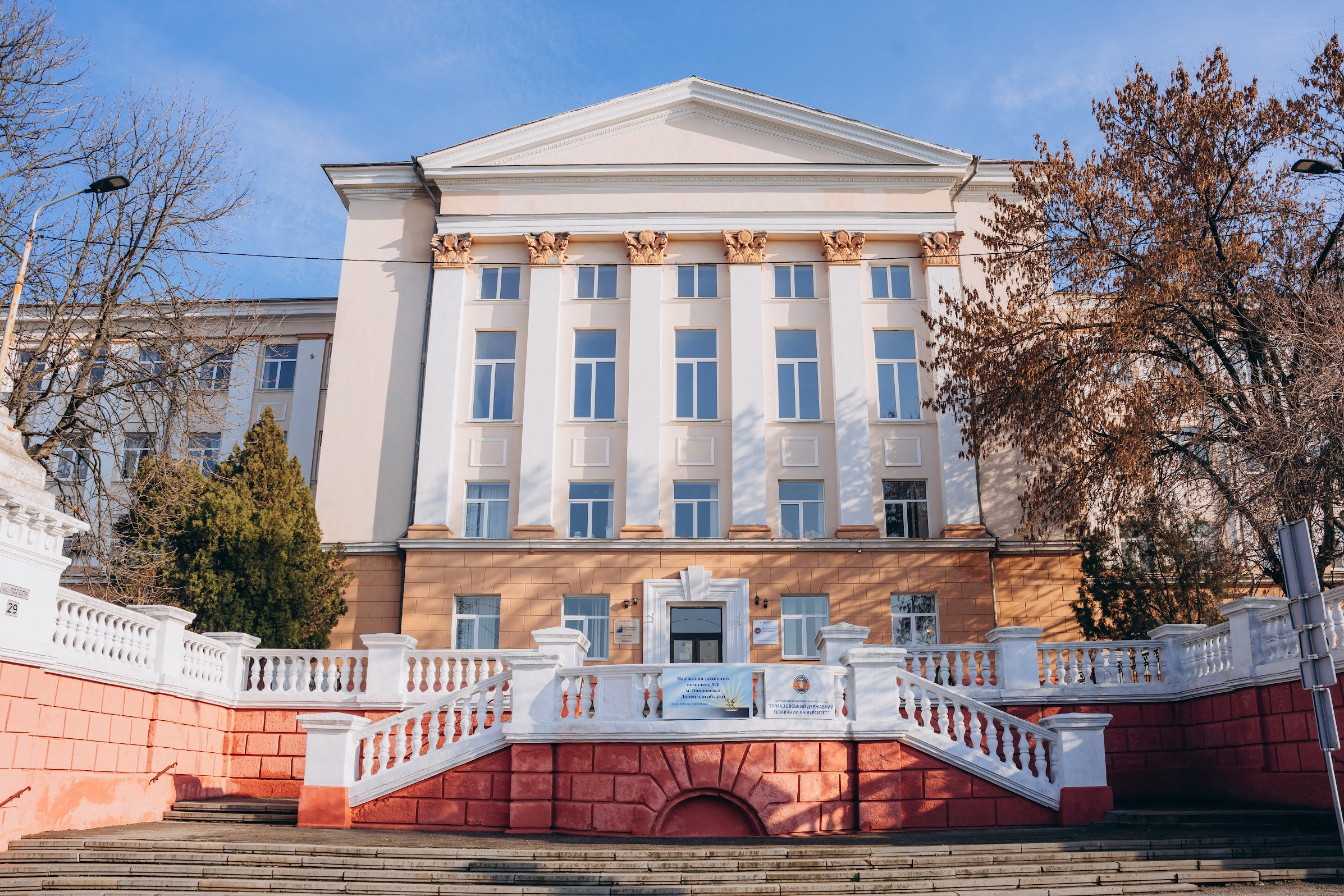
Pryazovskyi State Technical University in the city of Dnipro

== Rectors ==
- Kostiantyn Chernousov (1930–1933)
- Viktor Krasylnykov (1931–1933)
- Dmytro Almashyn (1933–1935)
- Mykhailo Hyrshovych (1935–1938)
- Ivan Vdovenko (1937–1938, 1943–1944)
- Mykhailo Ozerov (1938–1941)
- Tymofii Smyrnov (1944–1951)
- Mykola Kaloshyn (1951–1969)
- Yevhen Kapustin (1969–1981)
- Ihor Zhezhelenko (1981–2003)
- Vyacheslav Voloshyn (2003–2022)
- Olena Khadzhynova (2022–present)

== Rankings ==
According to the "TOP-200 Ukraine" ranking for 2024, Pryazovskyi State Technical University achieved:

- 1st place among 11 higher education institutions relocated after 2022
- 4th place among 31 institutions relocated after 2014
- 7th place among 20 institutions in Dnipro city and Dnipropetrovsk Oblast
- 77th place among 235 higher education institutions in Ukraine

== Notable alumni ==
- Volodymyr Boyko – Hero of Ukraine recipient
- Natalia Kharakoz – First woman in Mariupol to become a member of the National Writers' Union of Ukraine
- Serhiy Taruta – Chairman of the Board of Directors of OAO "Industrialnyi Soiuz Donbassa"

== See also ==
List of universities in Ukraine
