= Livoberezhnyi District =

Livoberezhnyi District Лівобережний район
- Urban district
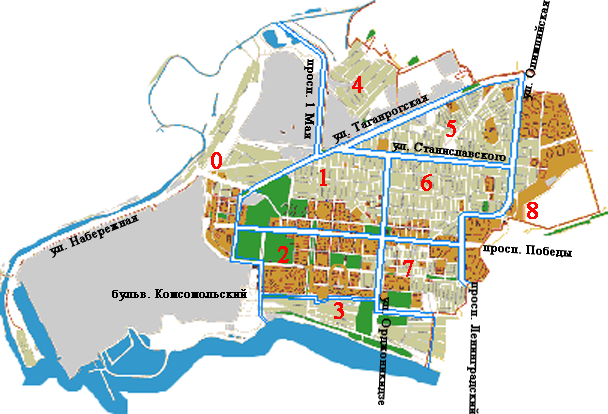
- map
- Interactive map of Livoberezhnyi District
- Country: Ukraine
- Oblast: Donetsk Oblast

Area
  - Total: 35.568 km^{2} (13.733 sq mi)

Population
  - Total: 122,175
- Time zone: UTC+2 (EET)
  - Summer (DST): UTC+3 (EEST)

Livoberezhnyi District (Ukrainian: Лівобережний район), formerly known as Ordzhonikidze District, is an urban district of the city of Mariupol, Ukraine. The district was established in 1939.

On 5 June 2015, the formerly separate settlement Vynohradne was administratively merged into Livoberezhnyi District. In 2016, the district was renamed to its current name to comply with decommunization laws.
