= Mariupol City Council =

City council of Mariupol, Ukraine

Mariupol City Council Маріупольська міська рада
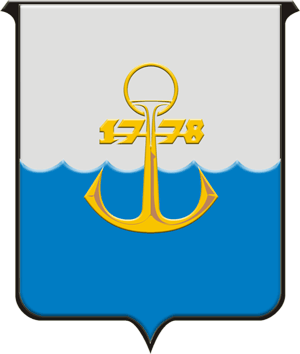

Type
- Type: Unicameral

Leadership
- Mayor: Vadym Boychenko, Vadym Boychenko Bloc; 15 December 2015 – present (de jure)

Structure
- Seats: 54
- Political groups: Vadym Boychenko Bloc (22); Opposition Platform — For Life (10); Party of Shariy (5); Servant of the People (4); Power of the People (4); Vacant (9) (Note: 9 deputies from Opposition Platform — For Life defected to work for pro-Russian authorities)
- Length of term: 5 years

Elections
- Last election: 25 October 2020
- Next election: Unknown (due to Russian occupation)

Meeting place
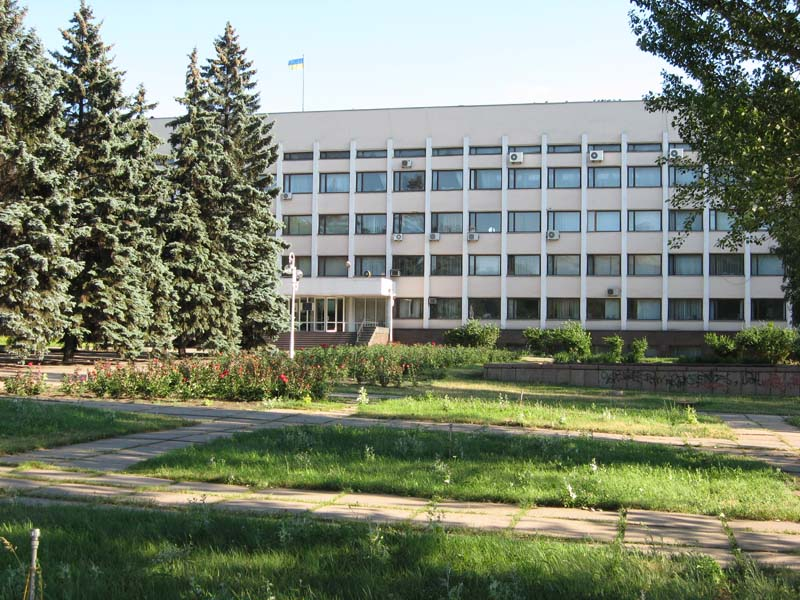

Website
- mariupolrada.gov.ua

Mariupol City Council (Ukrainian: Маріупольська міська рада) is the municipal council governing the Ukrainian city of Mariupol.

== History ==
=== Building ===
The building of the Mariupol City Executive Committee was built in 1970. Before the October Revolution, a cesspool was located on the site of the modern building. During World War II, a German artillery battery was stationed on this site.

On 13 April 2014, during the pro-Russian protests in Mariupol, pro-Russian activists seized the city council building. Then weeks later on 7 May, Mariupol People's militia retook control of the building from the pro-Russian activists.

Then several days later on 11 May, a fire broke out in the building. Following the fire, the partially-burnt building was unsuitable for continued use, and as a result remain unused until 2019, when European Bank for Reconstruction and Development allocated 117 million hryvnias for reconstruction. Construction work began in 2020, and are ongoing as of April 2021.

=== Composition ===
After the 2010 Ukrainian local elections, the 76 elected deputies are from the following parties: 64 from the Party of Regions , 4 from the Communist Party of Ukraine, 4 from the Front for Change, 2 from the Socialist Party of Ukraine, 2 from Strong Ukraine.

Following the 2015 Ukrainian local elections, the 54 elected deputies are from the following parties: 45 from the Opposition Bloc, 5 from the Power of the People, 4 from Our Land.

Following the 2020 Ukrainian local elections, the 54 elected deputies are from the following parties: 22 from the Vadym Boychenko Bloc, 19 from the Opposition Platform — For Life, 5 from the Party of Shariy, 4 from the Power of the People, and 4 from Servant of the People.

Prior to the Russian invasion of Ukraine in 2022, the head of the city council is the mayor of Mariupol Vadym Boychenko. Following the Siege of Mariupol, 9 deputies from the city council defected to Russian authorities, all from Opposition Platform — For Life.
