= Teatralna Square, Donetsk =

Square in Donetsk, Ukraine

Coordinates: 48°0′21″N 37°48′14″E

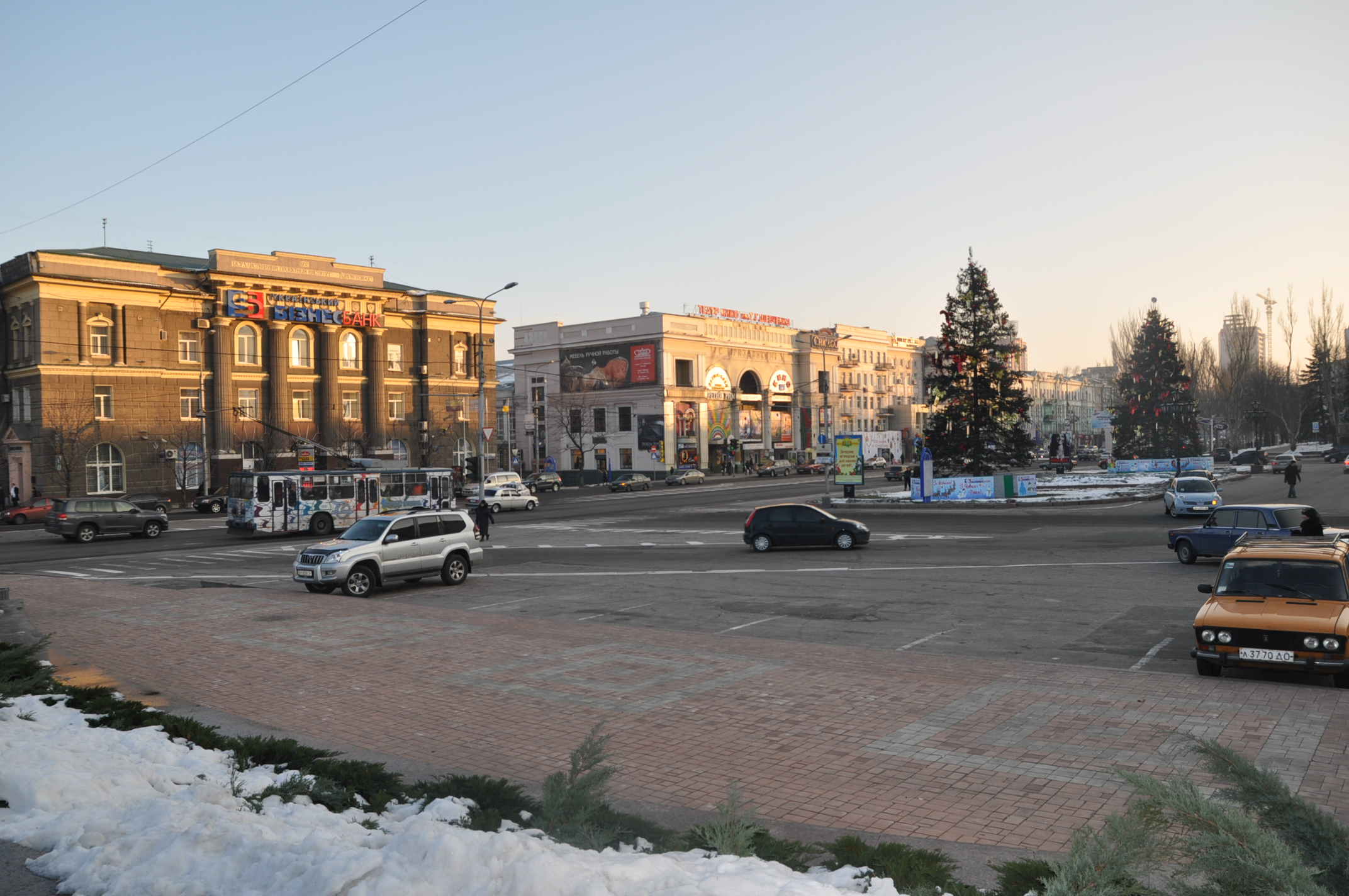
Theatre Square in winter.

Teatralna Square (Ukrainian: Театральна площа, translit.: Teatral`na ploscha; literally: Theatre Square) is a city square in Voroshilovskyi District of Donetsk, Ukraine. It's located at the junction of Avenue Theatre and Artema Street, the main street in Donetsk. The square is named after the theatre situated there — Donetsk State Academic Opera and Ballet Theatre Solovyanenko.

The square is served by numerous marshrutkas, buses and trolley-buses.

== Attractions ==
- Donetsk State Academic Opera and Ballet Theatre Solovyanenko
- Cinema Shevchenko
- Monument Gurov
- Monument Grinkevich
- Monument Solovyanenko
- Scythian track
- Dwelling houses designed by architect Blahodatnyi
