= Shakhtar Stadium =

Shakhtar Stadium may refer to:

- Shakhtar Stadium (Donetsk), a multi-purpose stadium in Donetsk, Ukraine
- Shakhtar Stadium (Oleksandriya), a former name for CSC Nika Stadium in the city of Oleksandria, Ukraine
- Shakhtar Stadium (Horlivka), a multi-purpose stadium in Horlivka, Ukraine
