= Donetsk Regional State Administration Building =

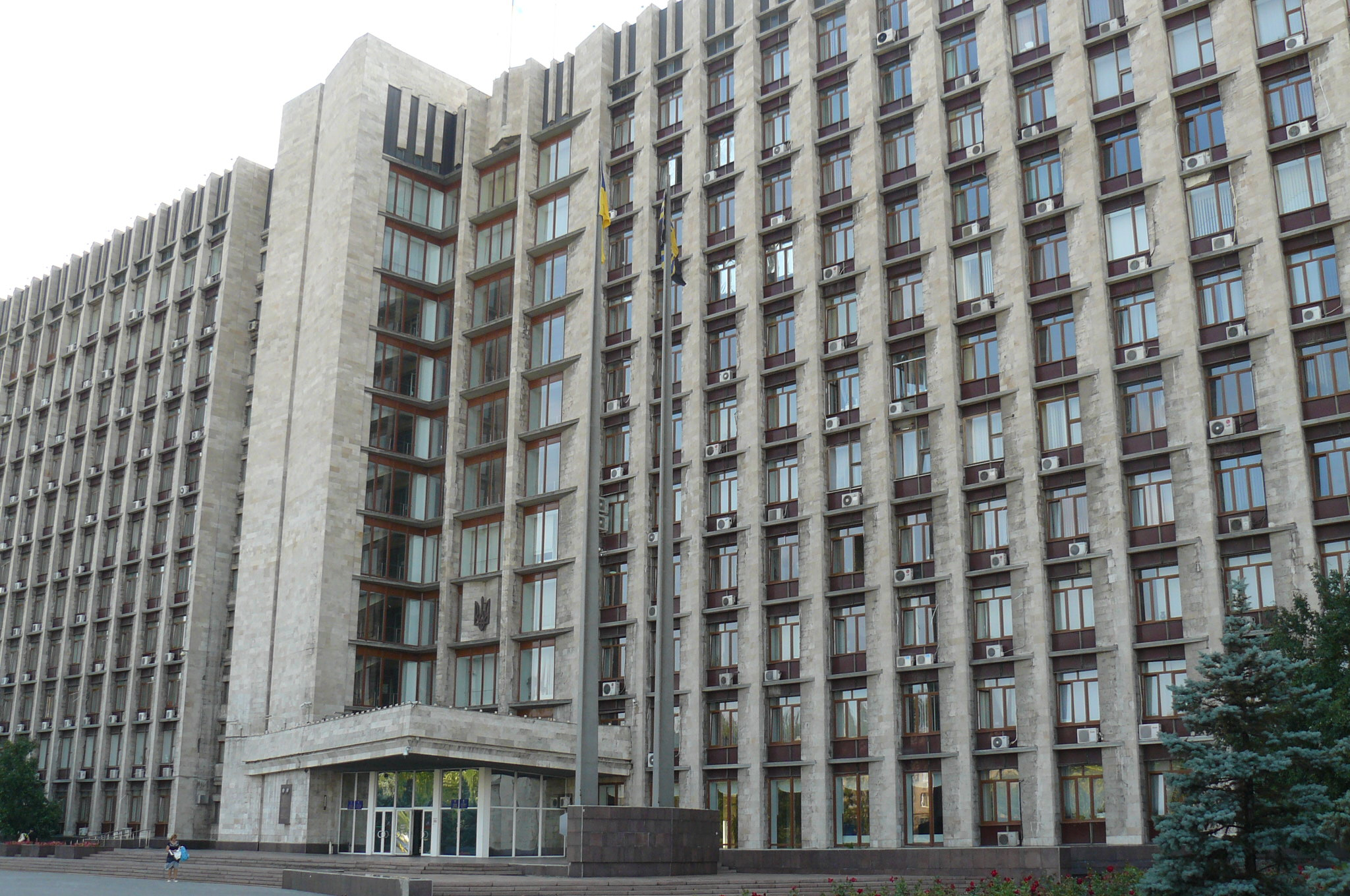
Donetsk RSA Building in 2012

The Donetsk Regional State Administration Building (Ukrainian: Будівля Донецької обласної державної адміністрації) in Donetsk is the primary government headquarters (referred to as the Donetsk Regional State Administration; Ukrainian: Донецька обласна державна адміністрація) of Donetsk Oblast, a province located eastern Ukraine. It is located in the city's Voroshilov Raion, along the Pushkin Boulevard. It is currently controlled by the Donetsk People's Republic.

== 2014 protests ==
In March and April 2014, the building was the site of a number of pro-Russian protests. Pro-Russian protesters occupied the Donetsk RSA from March 1 to March 6, 2014, before being removed by the Security Service of Ukraine. During that time, Pavel Gubarev declared himself the "People's Governor" of the oblast and was subsequently arrested.

On April 6, 2014, a group of separatists again occupied a part of the RSA building and then declared the creation of the Donetsk People's Republic.
