= Central Scherbakov Park of Culture and Leisure =

Park in Donetsk, Ukraine

Coordinates: 47°59′42″N 37°47′28″E

Central Park of Culture and Leisure named after Shcherbakov is a recreation park in Donetsk. It is located in Voroshylovskyi Raion, in the west it matches with stadium Shakhtar, and in the north there is the Second city pond.

Park was open in 1932. There are rides, playgrounds, alleys for hiking and other recreational facilities available for visitors. The park is named after Alexander Sergeevich Shcherbakov, who was the Secretary of the Donetsk Oblast Party Committee in 1938. However, the original name was different – at first the park was named after Pavel Petrovich Postyshev, but the park was renamed after the last had been arrested.

== Formation of the park ==
The park is located in Skoromoshnaya gully, which was the meeting place for workers of Yuzovsky metallurgical plant and the nearby coal mines in the 19th century. A travelling circus stayed here, and mass celebrations were held. In 1891 the river was blocked by a dam, resulting in a first city pond that provided the steel works with water. In 1931 they decided to create a park, and in September 1932 10 000 Komsomol members and the city pioneers started work on park creation. 120 hectares of the open steppe land area near river Bakhmutka (First city pond) in the Skomoroshnaya gully was allocated for the park. In 1933 the alleys were established lined with chestnut trees, lime trees and poplars. On opening day, about sixty thousand people visited the park. Amusement rides started functioning in 1934. Later, the area of the park was increased to 200 hectares, yet reduced to 96 hectares by 2000. At the initial planning except the Central Park there were separate functional zones: a Central Beach park, Amusement park, Regional Park "Medium Ponds", landscape park "Urban forest" and the "Upper" landscape park. The park is located along the coastline of connected ponds, and landscape compositions, most open to the water area direction. In the center the terraces are situated, the lowest of which is the parterre, which is the basis of the composition. The stadium Shakhtar is built on the upper terrace in 1936 (designed by architects Georgy Nawrocki and S. Severin). In 1932 the park held an agricultural exhibition, for which pavilions were built. Before 2008 the entrance to the park from Stadionnaya street looked like a group of columns with cornices; in 2008 it was decorated with ornate metal gates and became a major entrance. In the postwar period in the park there were about a hundred names of tree and shrub species, and the 1955 edition "Donbass Parks" referred to Shcherbakov park as to one of the best parks in Donbas. On November 15, 2008, Donetsk journalists established "Alley of Journalists". In 2006 reconstruction of the large park started, "Donetskproekt" fulfilled the pre-design for improvement of the waterfront in the park. During the reconstruction, the pond embankment was reinforced and purged. In 2008 forged pavilion was established in the park and rosary with variety of roses was made.

== Sculptures ==
The sculptural decoration of the park of the Soviet times was ideology-determined. White statue of Joseph Stalin was established in front of the bridge framed in acacia and dominated over the whole complex of the central park. Behind the back of Stalin statue there was a sculpture of athlete jumping into the water and the fountain with athletes' sculptures who were holding a vase in outstretched hands. In the fountain bowl there was a sculpture of a Sportswoman with ball. Stadium "Shakhtar" was decorated with monumental sculptures on the second floor. The sculptures of the postwar period were dismantled in 1970 during reconstruction of the central part of the park. During the renovation of the park in 2006–2008, a statue of the ancient girl with a jar was placed on the banking of the "First" pond. Also in 2008, in order to commemorate the City and the Miner's Day the "Good Angel of Peace" was established in the Park as international symbol of patronage. On the statue basis the names of famous Ukrainian patrons are carved: Nickolay Tereshchenko, Bogdan Khanenko, Vasiliy Tarnovskiy, Rinat Akhmetov and others. In 2008, 46 wooden sculptures depicting fantasy characters were established in the Park.

== Fountains ==
The fountain with athletes sculptures was dismantled in 1970 during reconstruction of the central part of the park, and replaced by a fountain, surrounded by a parapet. A cascade of fountains was organized from the central area to the bridge. Fountains of the 1970s were dismantled in the 2000s (decade). In 2007 a new fountain, consisting of 6 cups, lined with marble was open in the park. 200 lights are used in the fountain construction. During the renovation of the Park in 2006-2008 at the entrance from Stadionnaya street a new fountain was installed.

== Attractions ==
Children's Railway named after Kirov was launched on November 24, 1936. The train consisted of two coupled together trams, and the road line length was of about one kilometer. Due to the World War II outbreak, Kirov Children's Railway ceased to exist and was never rebuilt. The park also previously had a musical shell, a summer theater for 1000 spectators, "Green" summer cinema for 2,200 seats, a dance floor, a restaurant, parachute tower (existed until 1970), reading, chess and checkers pavilions. Currently, 23 kinds of amusement rides are working in the park, the boat station offers boats and catamarans to hire. In 2009 Dolphinarium "Nemo" was open as a part of the national complex of cultural and recreational centres «Nemo». The (at the time abandoned) dolphinarium was destroyed in a fire in November 2016.

== Gallery ==
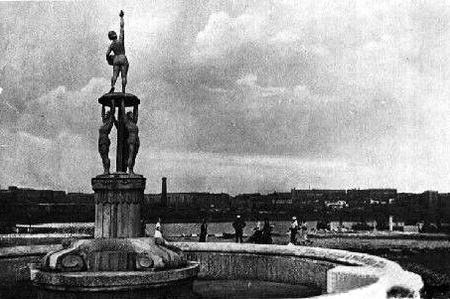
1938, fountain in the Postyshev park

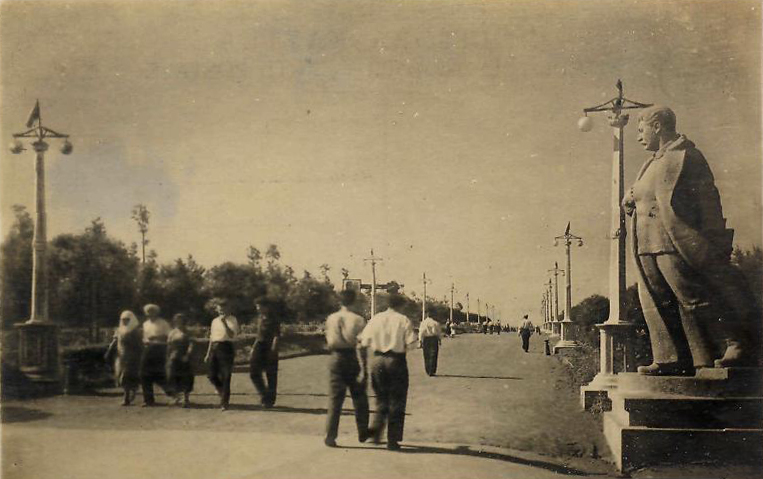
Monument to Joseph Stalin

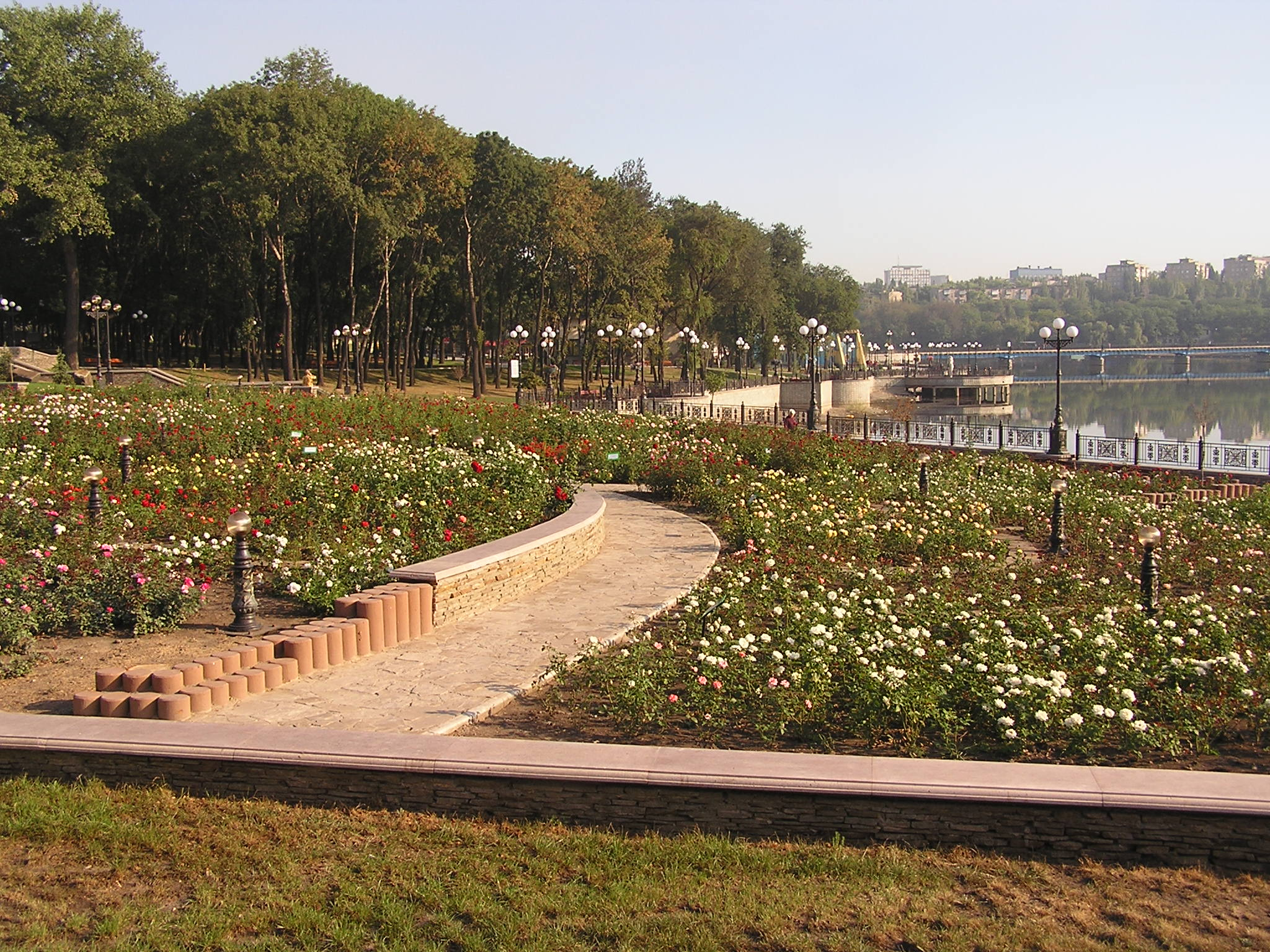
Roses in Shcherbakov park

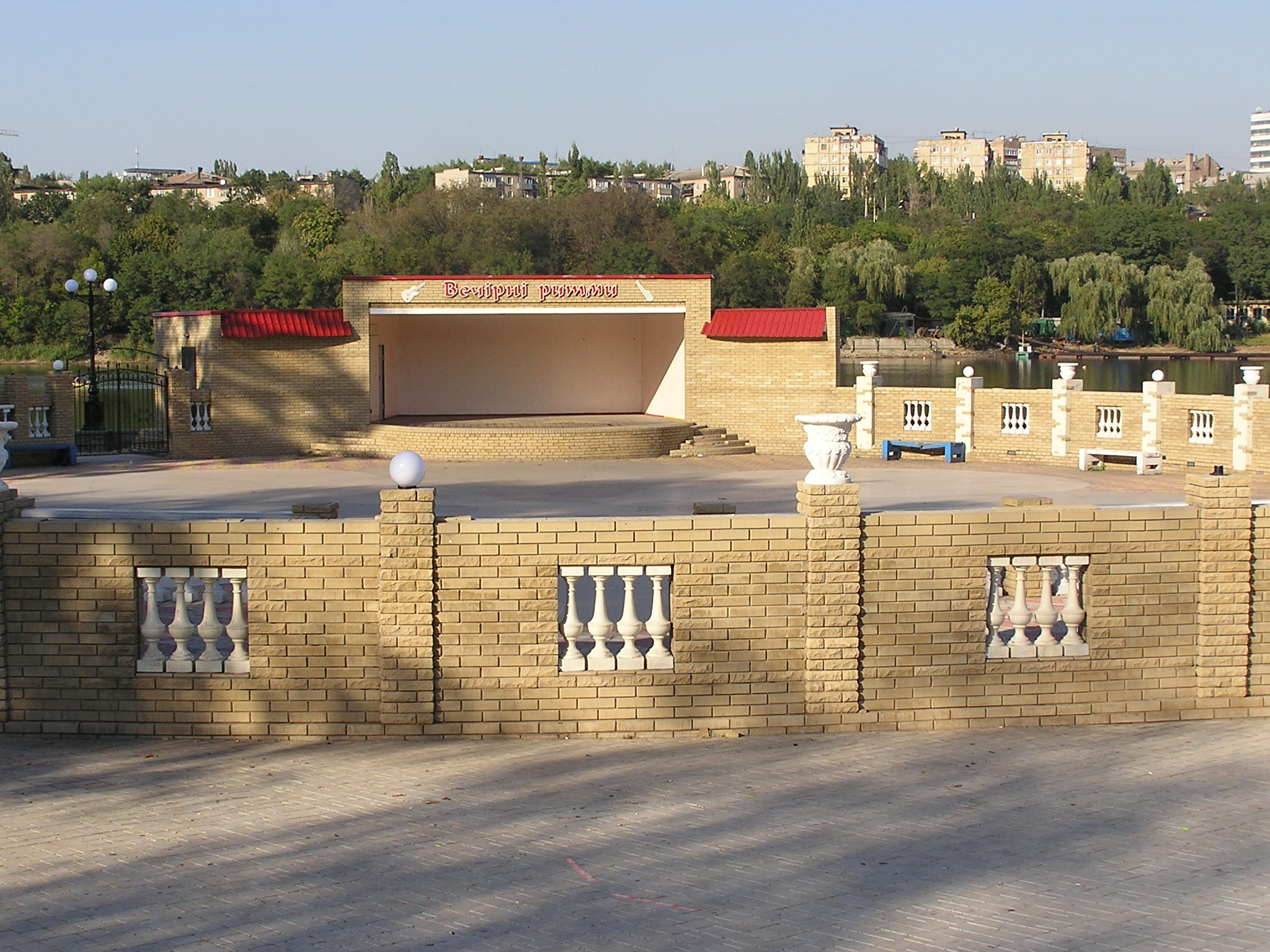
Open dance floor

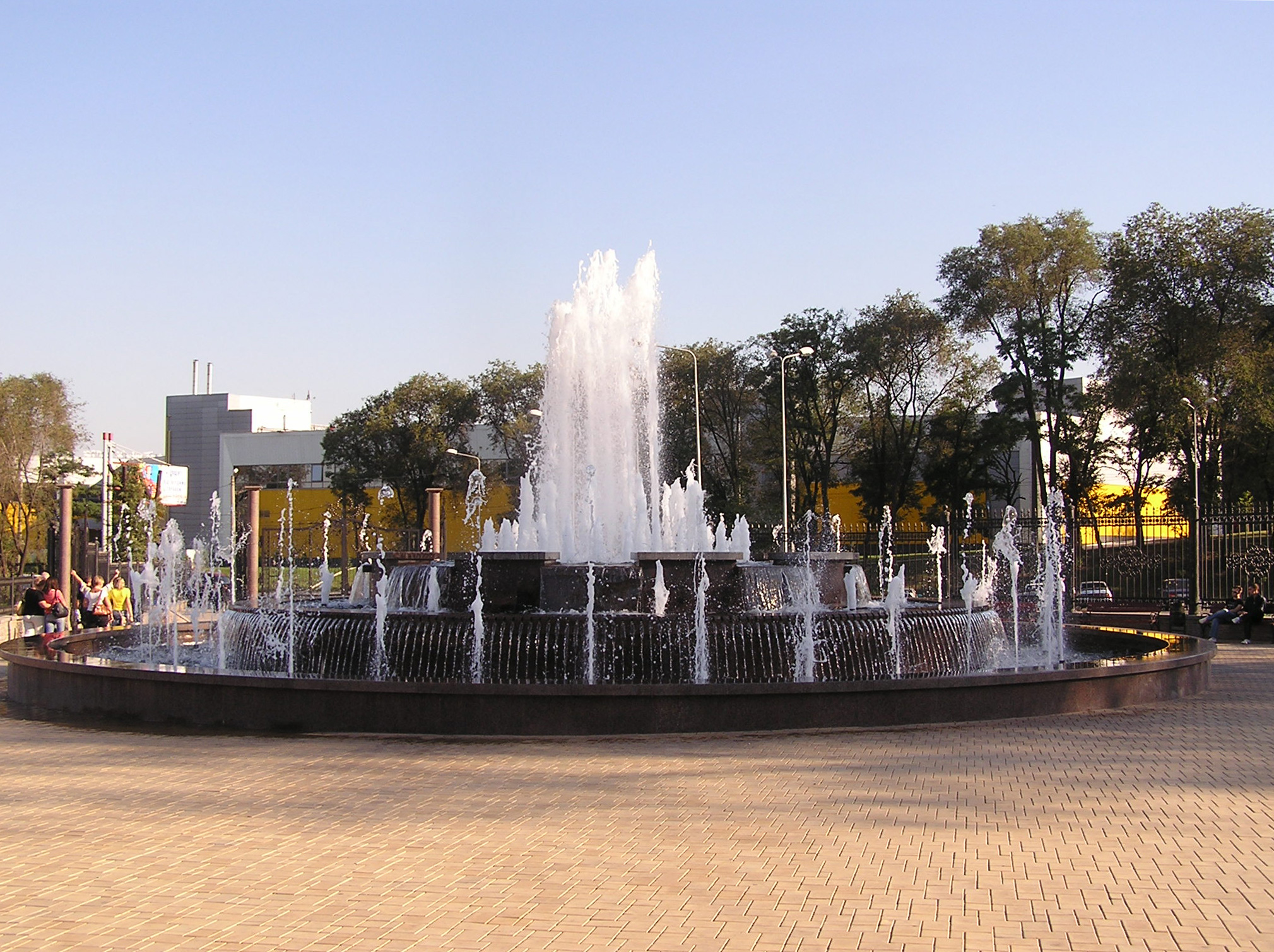
Fountain

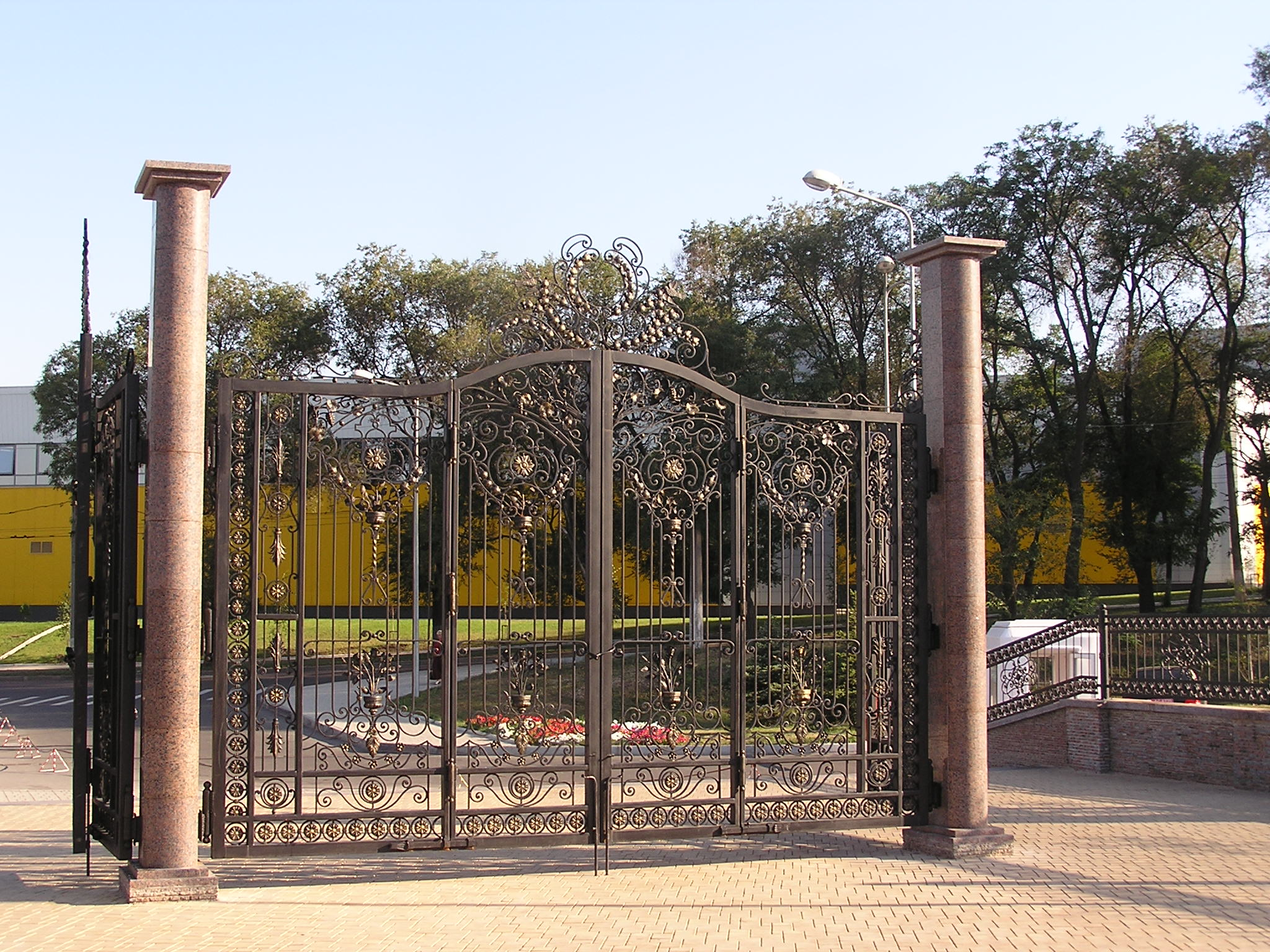
Main entrance

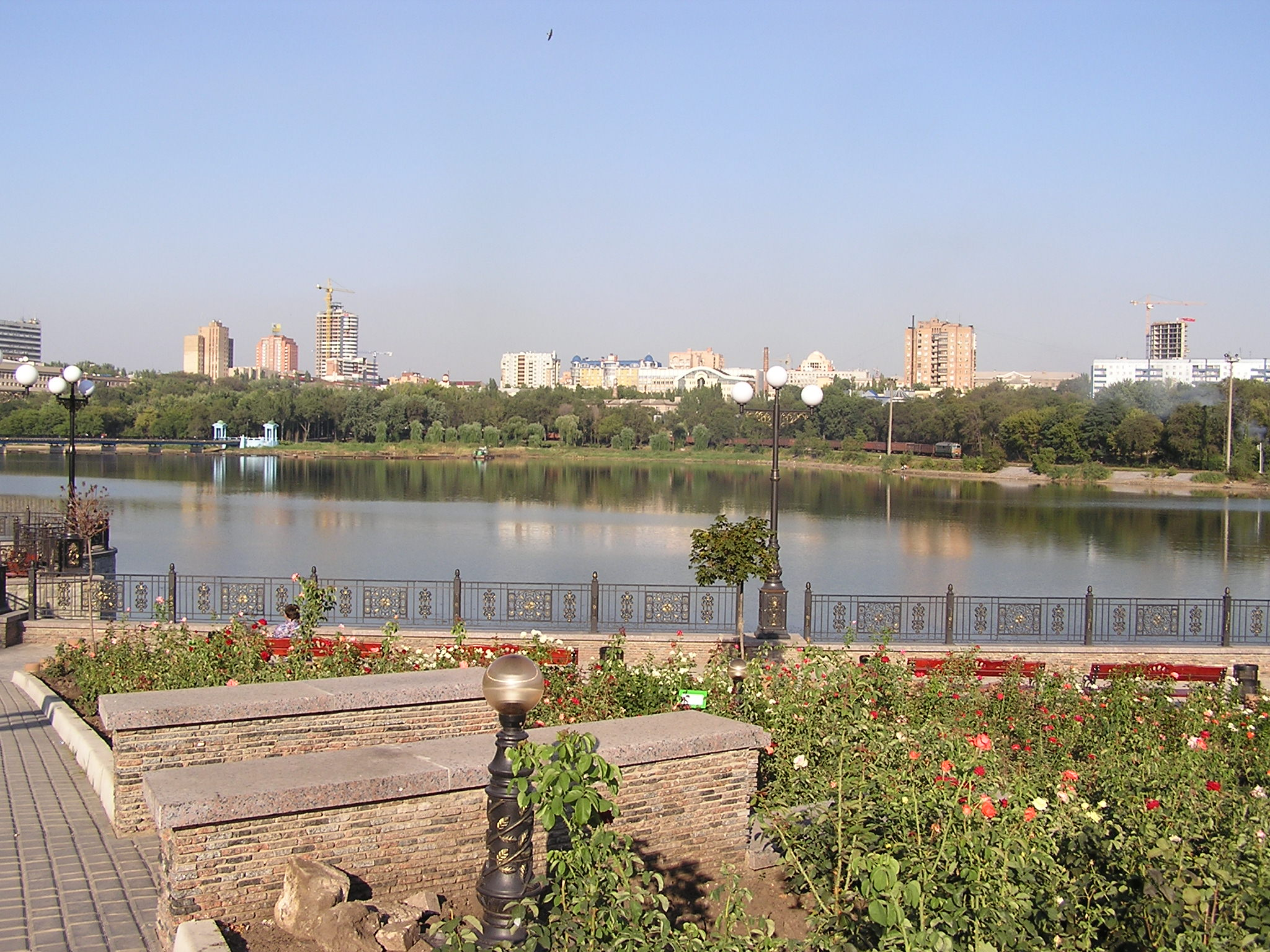
Pond view

== See also ==
- Donetsk
