= Shakhtar Stadium (Donetsk) =

Multi-purpose stadium in Ukraine

Central Stadium "Shakhtar"
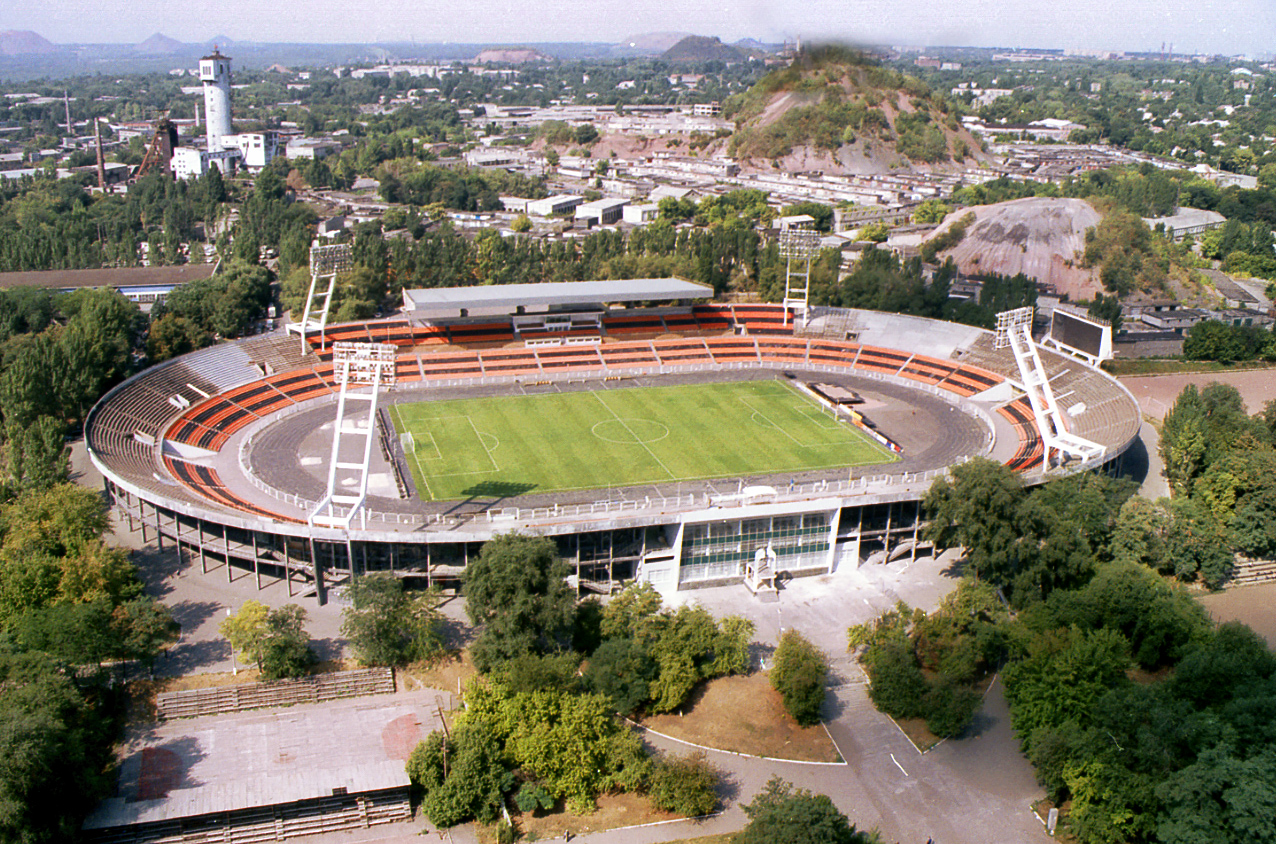
- buildings and tailing of the Gorky Coal Mine in the background
- Interactive map of Central Stadium "Shakhtar"
- Location: Voroshylovskyi District, Donetsk (Note: Donetsk is claimed by both Russia and Ukraine. As of July 2026, Russia controls the city but is internationally recognized as being part of Ukraine.)
- Coordinates: 47°59′40.18″N 37°47′08.69″E
- Owner: Shakhtar Donetsk
- Capacity: 31,718 (football)
- Surface: Grass
- Field size: 105 m × 68 m (344 ft × 223 ft)

Construction
- Groundbreaking: Spring 1936
- Opened: 5 September 1936; 89 years ago
- Renovated: 1950, 1966, 1981, 2000
- Architects: Georgiy Navrotskiy, S.Severin

Tenants
- Shakhtar Donetsk (1936–2004); Shakhtar Donetsk reserves Metalurh Donetsk (international games)

Central Stadium Shakhtar (Ukrainian: Центральний стадіон «Шахтар»; Russian: Стадион «Шахтёр») is a multi-purpose stadium that is located in the Shcherbakov Central Park, in Voroshylovskyi District, Donetsk. The stadium is located near the Gorky Coal Mine, and one of its tailings (terra-cone) was sometimes used to watch matches. The stadium has a capacity of 31,718. Shakhtar Stadium was the primary home ground for Shakhtar Donetsk and a major football arena in Ukraine until the early 2000s.

== Description ==
The stadium was built in 1936 specifically for Shakhtar (Stakhanovets) Stalino, with the most recent reconstruction in 2000. It is located in the central city's park near a big pond. The park itself is located on the border of Kuibyshevskyi, Leninskyi, and Voroshylovskyi districts.

== 1995 explosion ==
On 15 October 1995, soon after the start of a football match between Shakhtar and Tavriya (1995–96 league season), a large explosion rocked the stadium killing several people, including the local criminal and club owner Akhat Bragin and five men of his security team, all of whom died instantly. None of the stadium's 2,000 spectators suffered any injuries, but a buffet waitress was taken to a hospital in critical condition. Due to the explosion the game was interrupted and postponed for two weeks being rescheduled for 31 October 1995. Russian news media informed that Bragin had purchased control of FC Shakhtar Donetsk in 1994; Bragin had survived two previous assassination attempts involving automatic rifles. After the explosion, a special investigative commission was organized, consisting of various agencies including Ministry of Internal Affairs, Security Service of Ukraine, and General Prosecutor Office of Ukraine. The stadium did not function as a sports facility for several years, a local radio market being established there instead.

== Further plans ==
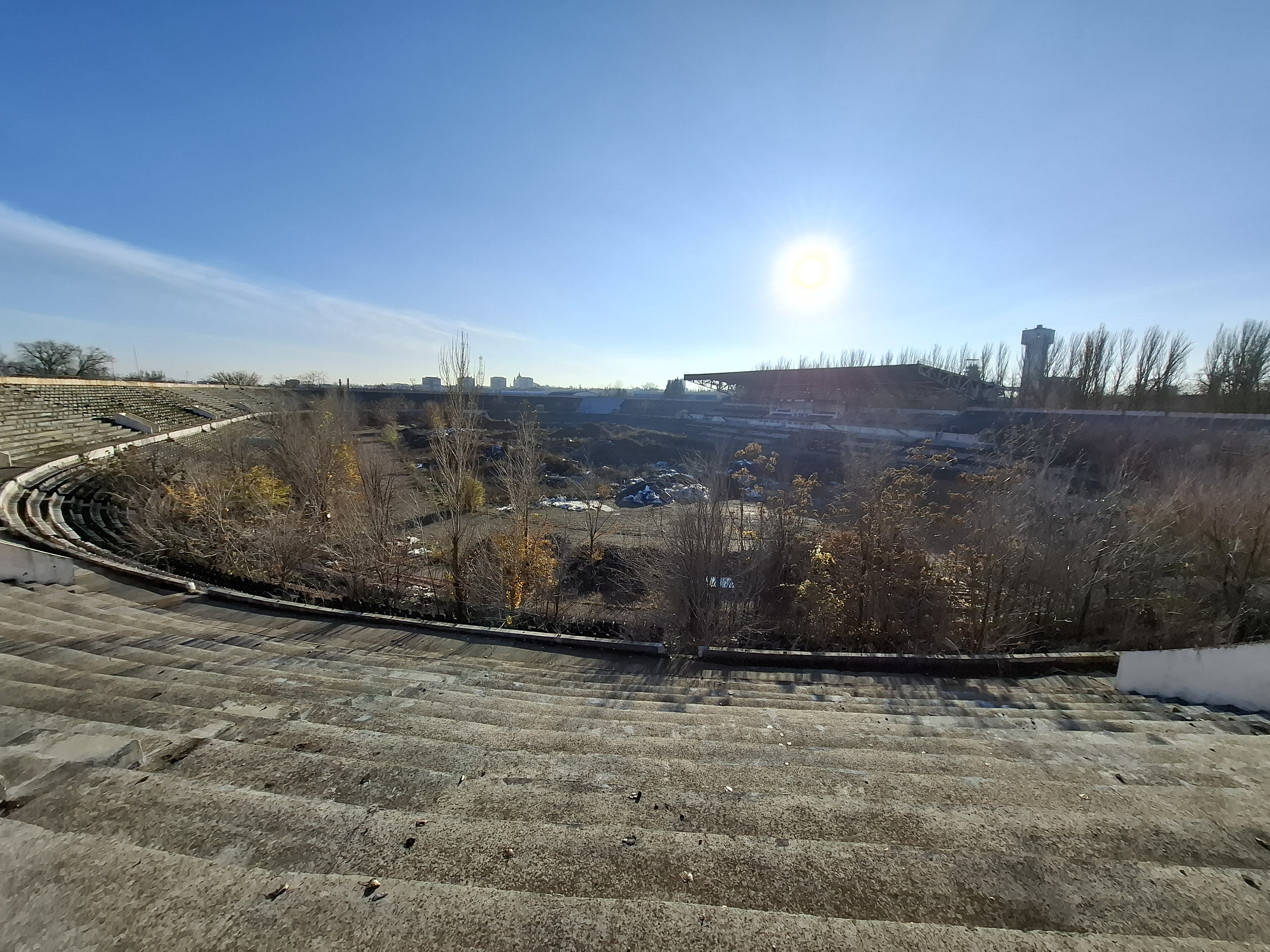
The stadium as of 2026

In 2010-11, the general director of Shakhtar Serhiy Palkin announced that the stadium would be rebuilt in its original architecture of 1936, however due to the UEFA Euro 2012 and later the 2014 war in Donbas that idea became abandoned. Currently, the stadium is abandoned and its stands are overgrown.

== Games of the Ukraine national football team ==
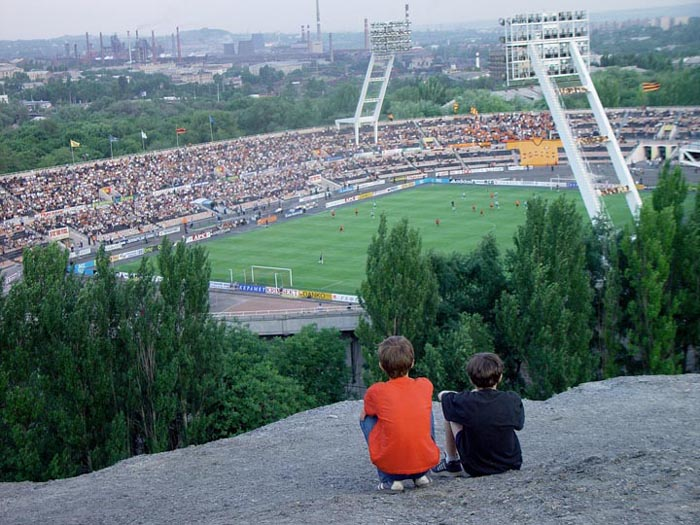
A Shakhtar match in the stadium seen from a nearby artificial hill (at the horizon is the Donetsk Metallurgical Plant)

Date	Type	Host	Score	Guest	Goals	Attendance
20 August 2003	Friendly	Ukraine	0:2	Romania	0:1 Mutu 29' (pen.); 0:2 Mutu 57'	
6 September 2003	Euro Qual.	Ukraine	0:0	Northern Ireland		32,000

== See also ==
- Yevhen Shcherban
