= Voroshylovskyi District, Donetsk =

Coordinates: 48°N 37.805°E

Voroshylovskyi District Ворошиловський район Ворошиловский район
- Urban district
- Yuzivskyi District
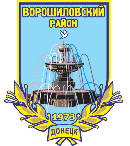
- Coat of arms
- Interactive map of Voroshylovskyi District
- Country: Ukraine (de jure), Russia (de facto)
- Oblast: Donetsk Oblast

Government
  - Head: Tatiana Kopylova (legitimacy disputed)

Area
  - Total: 9.80 km^{2} (3.78 sq mi)

Population
  - Total: 94,168 (Year 2,001)
  - Density: 9,609/km^{2} (24,890/sq mi)
- Time zone: UTC+2 (EET)
  - Summer (DST): UTC+3 (EEST)

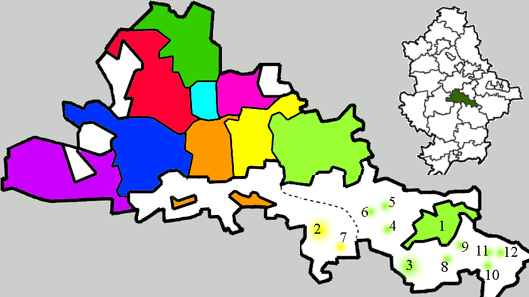
Districts of Donetsk on the territory of the Donetsk City Municipality: Budonivskyi District Voroshylovskyi District Kalininskyi District Kyivskyi District Kirovskyi District / Kuibyshevskyi District Leninskyi District Petrovskyi District Proletarskyi District

Voroshylovskyi District (Ukrainian: Ворошиловський район; Russian: Ворошиловский район) or Yuzivskyi District (Ukrainian: Юзівський район) is an urban district of Donetsk, Ukraine. It is the Donetsk's downtown and was created in 1973 after splitting away from the Kalininskyi District, Donetsk.

== Name ==
The district was named Voroshylovskyi in 1973 in honour of Kliment Voroshilov, a prominent Soviet marshal.

In 2026, the Donetsk Oblast Council adopted a decision to rename the district as Yuzivskyi District, pursuant to the Law of Ukraine ‘On the Condemnation and Prohibition of Propaganda of Russian Imperial Policy and Decolonisation of Toponymy', as well as related legislation on decommunisation. The new name refers to John Hughes, a Welsh industrialist widely regarded as the founder of the city.

However, as the city of Donetsk remains under Russian control, the renaming has not been recognised by the authorities administering the area and the district continues to be referred to de facto by its former name.

== Boundaries ==
The district occupies the central part of Donetsk, forming the city's historic and administrative core and containing its principal administrative, commercial, and cultural institutions.

Its western boundary is largely defined by the Kalmius River, which separates it from Kalininskyi District.

To the east, the district is bordered by a system of urban ponds and green areas, beyond which lies Kuibyshevskyi District.

To the north, it adjoins Kyivskyi District, with the boundary running along major central thoroughfares and urban development corridors.

To the south, the district borders Leninskyi District, with the boundary generally following railway infrastructure and industrial zones on the approaches to the Donetsk Metallurgical Plant.

== Demographics ==
According to the 2001 Ukrainian census, the district had a population of 94,228. The native language distribution was: Russian — 88.08% (83,002), Ukrainian — 10.25% (9,656), and other languages — 1.67% (1,570).

== Places ==
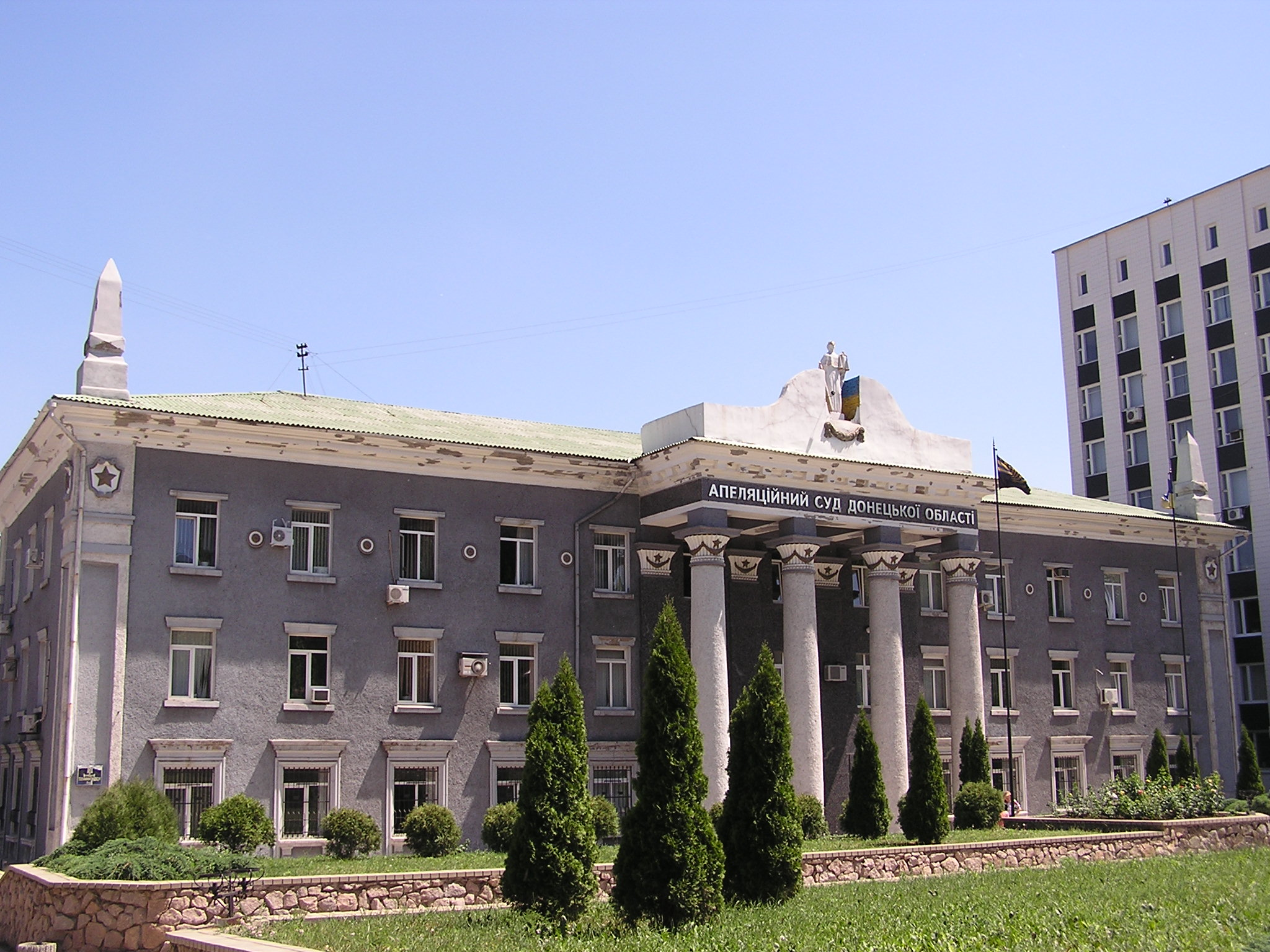
Donetsk Oblast Appellate Court (21st century)

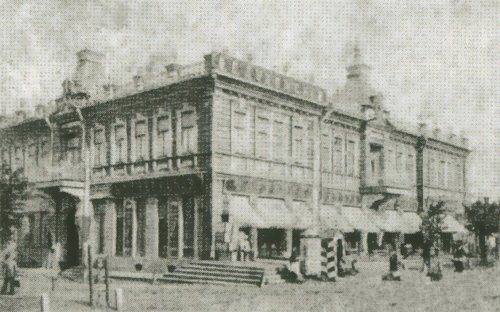
Yuzivka Social Assembly, the building was demolished before 1920

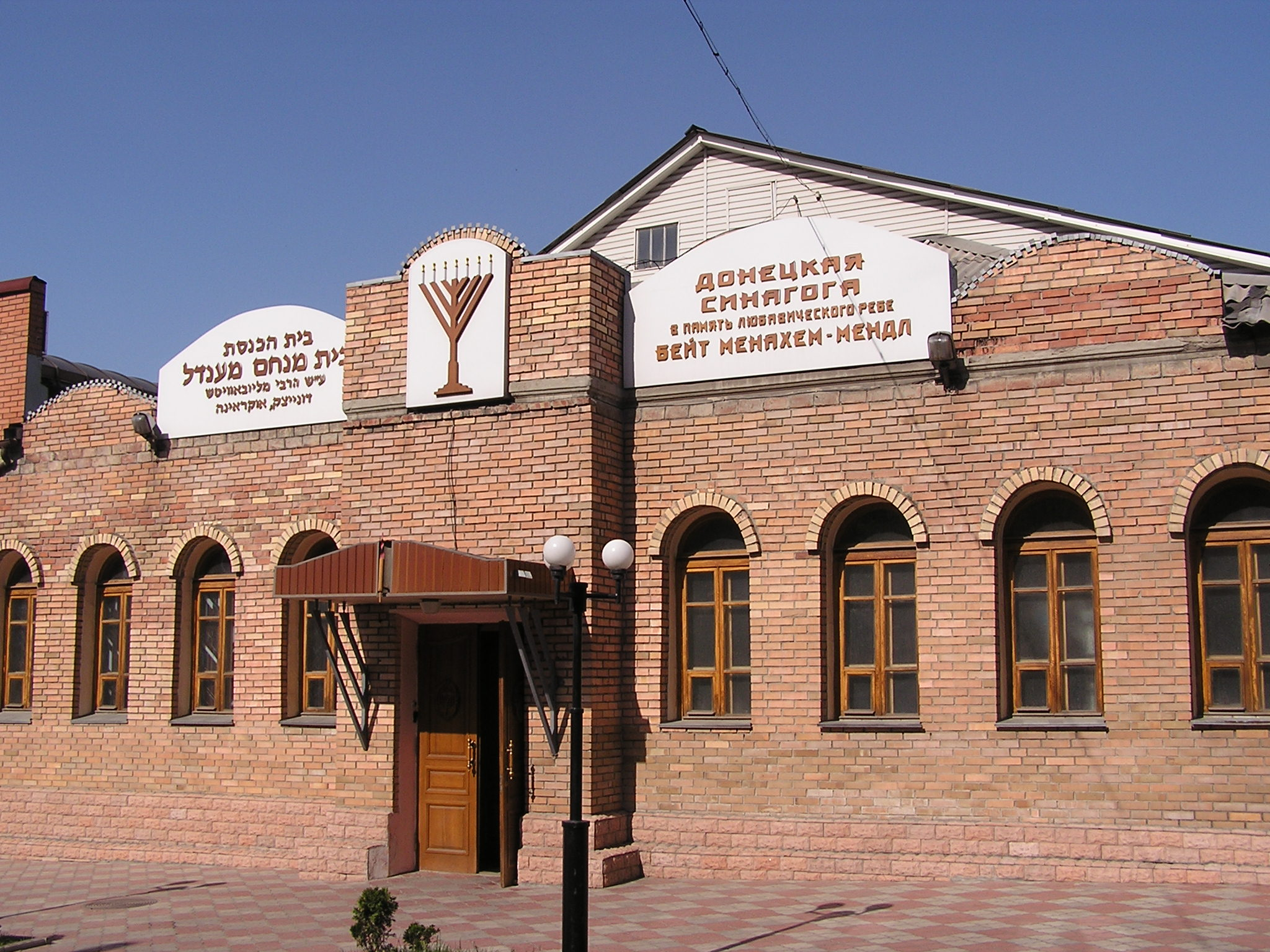
Donetsk Synagogue (21st century)

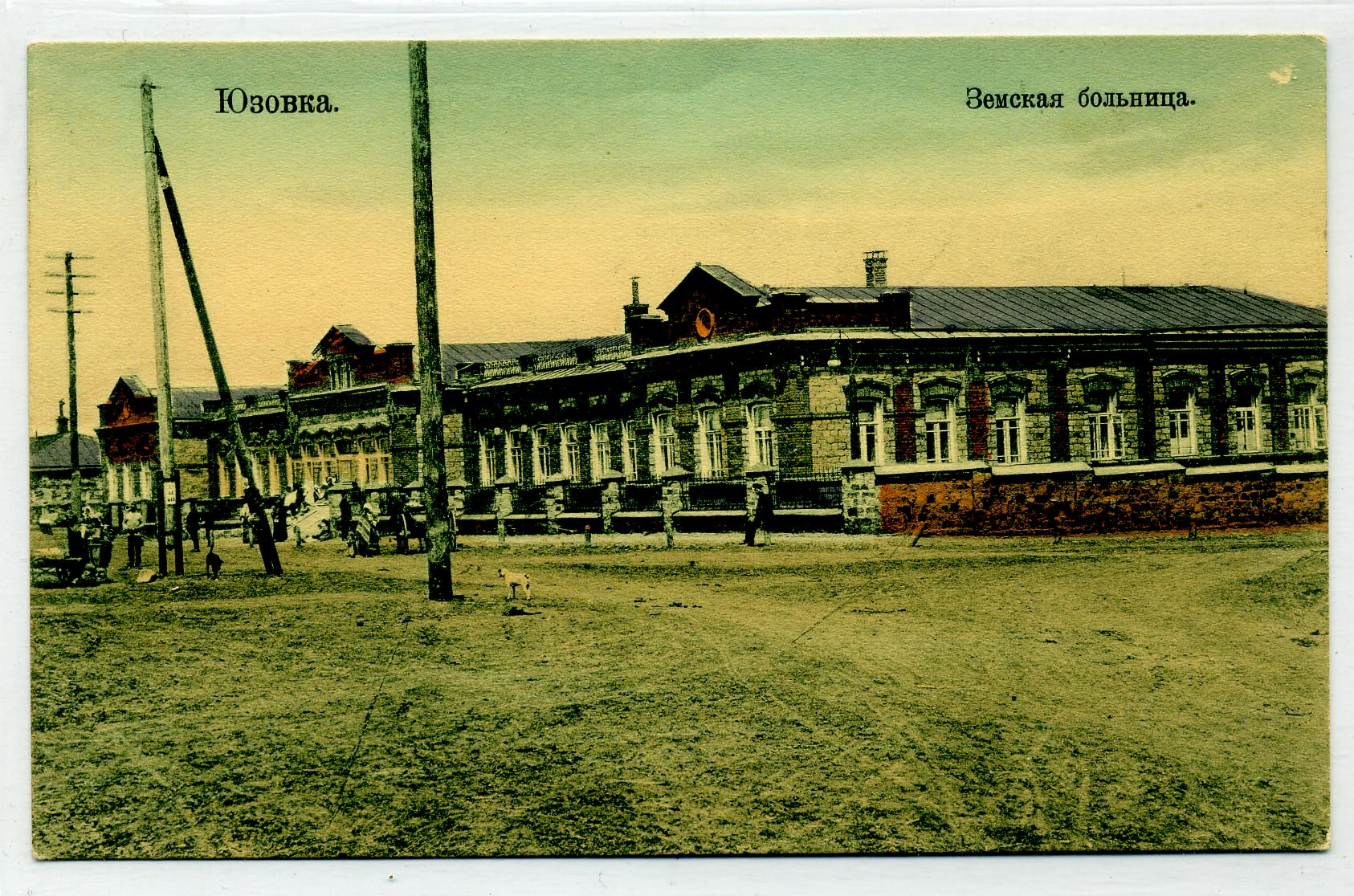
Yuzivka Regional Hospital, 1910

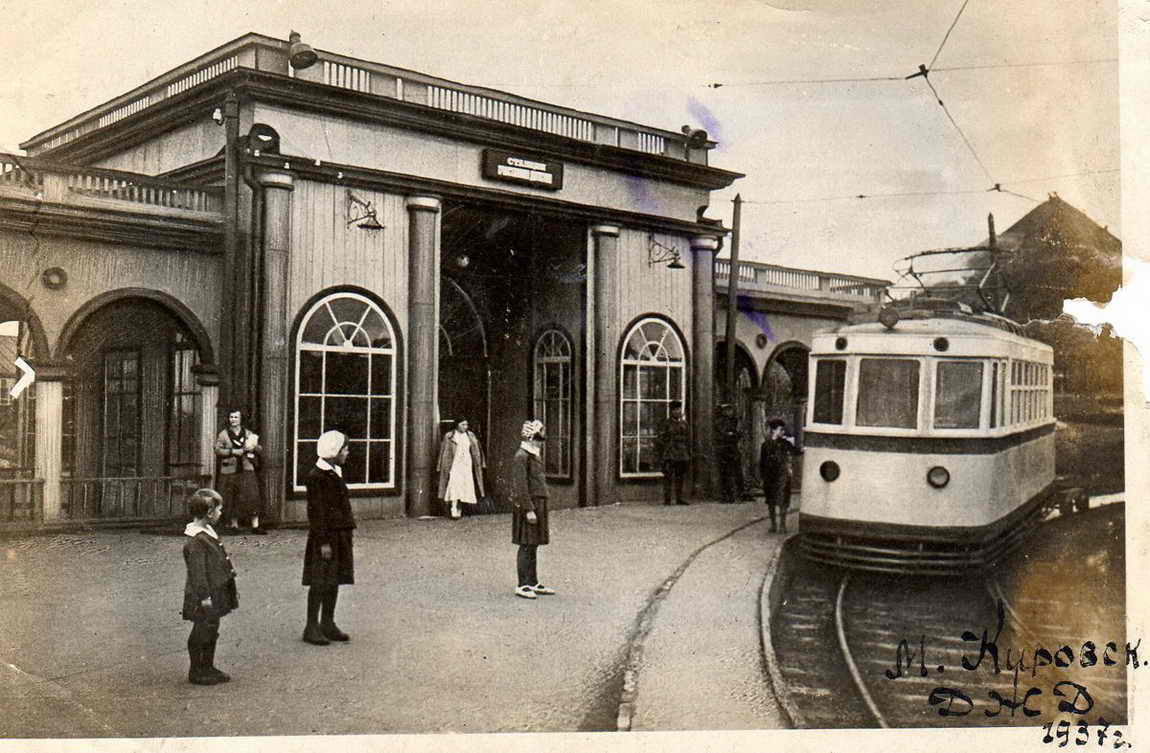
Station of the Donetsk children railroad, 1930s

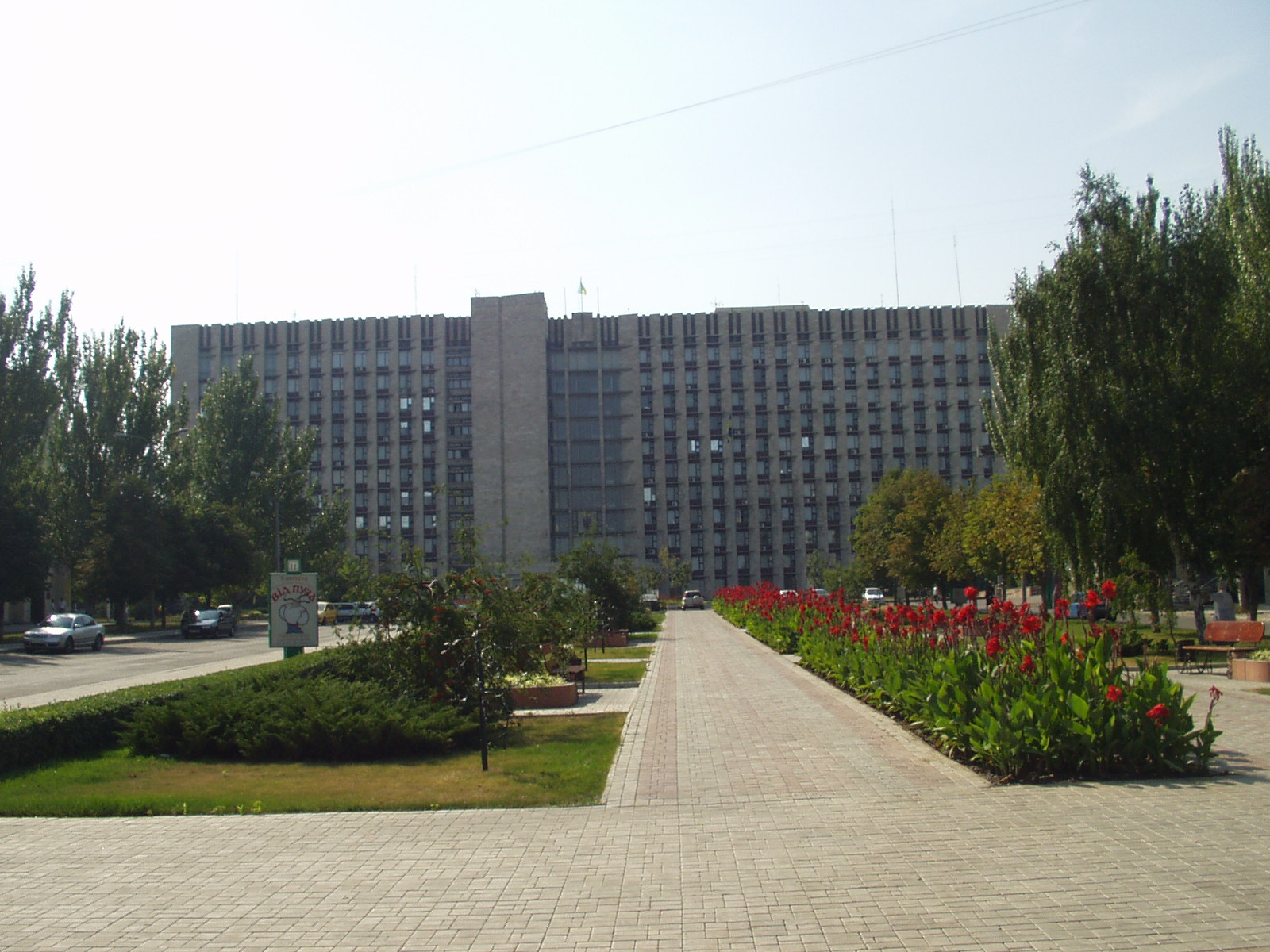
Building of the Donetsk Regional State Administration

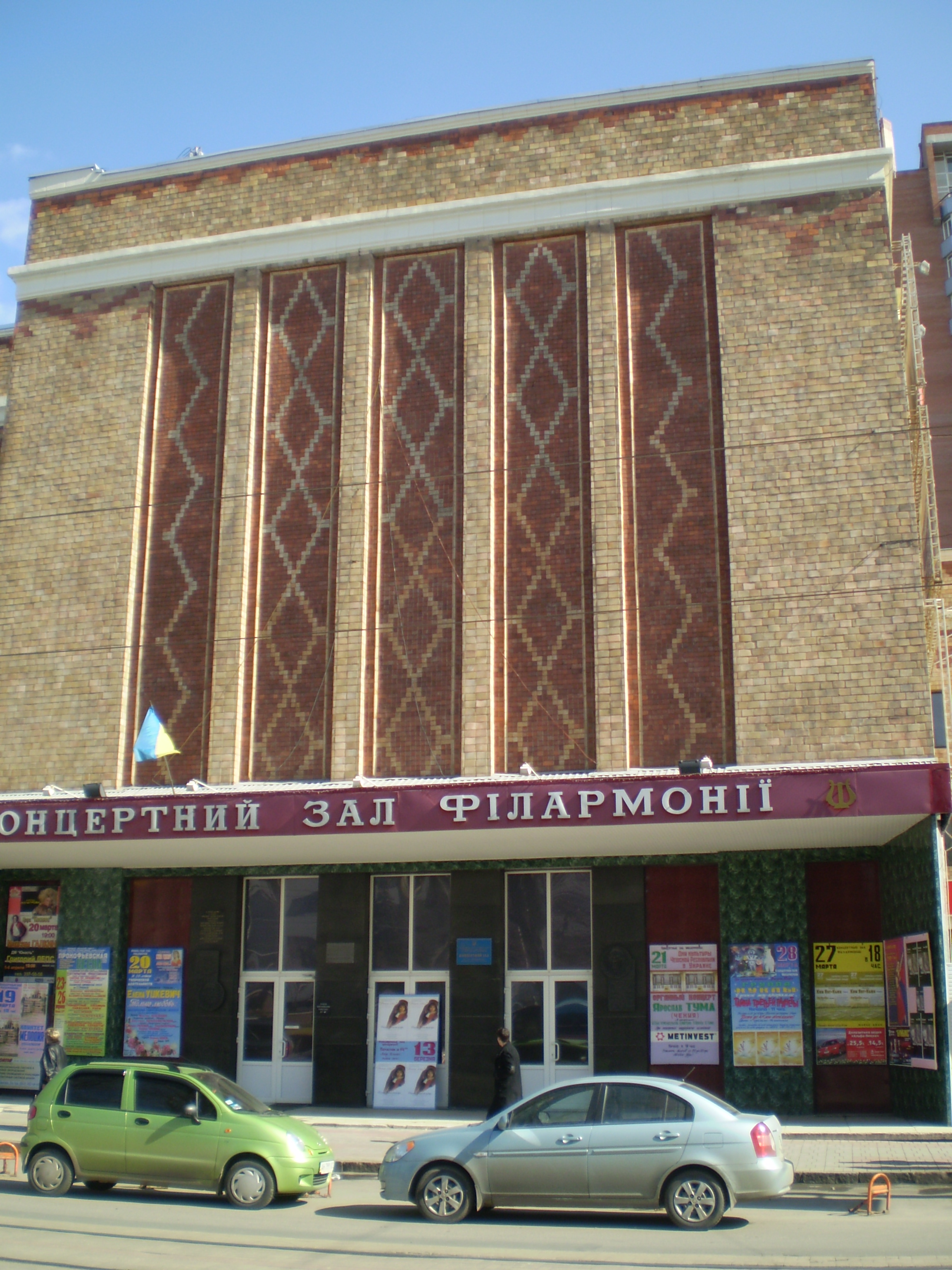
Donetsk Philharmony

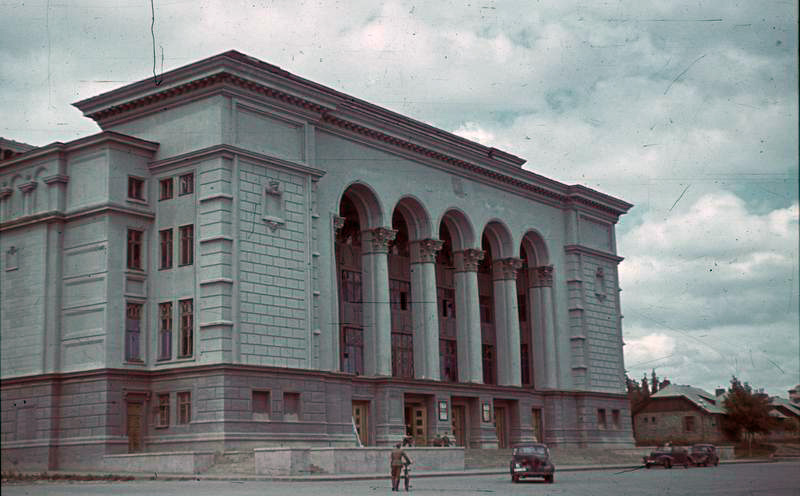
Donetsk Opera Theater during Nazi occupation

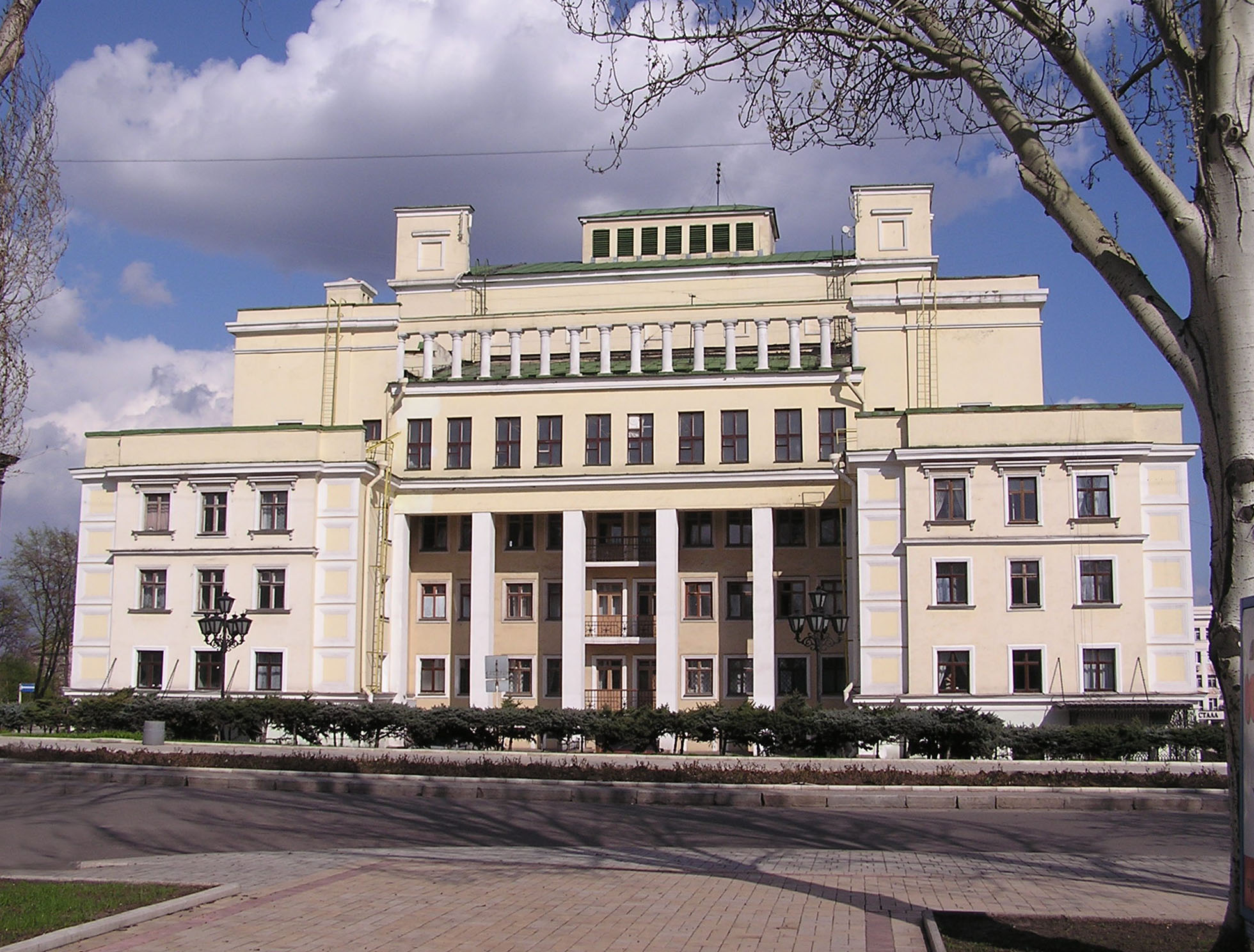
Opera Theater, different view, 2008

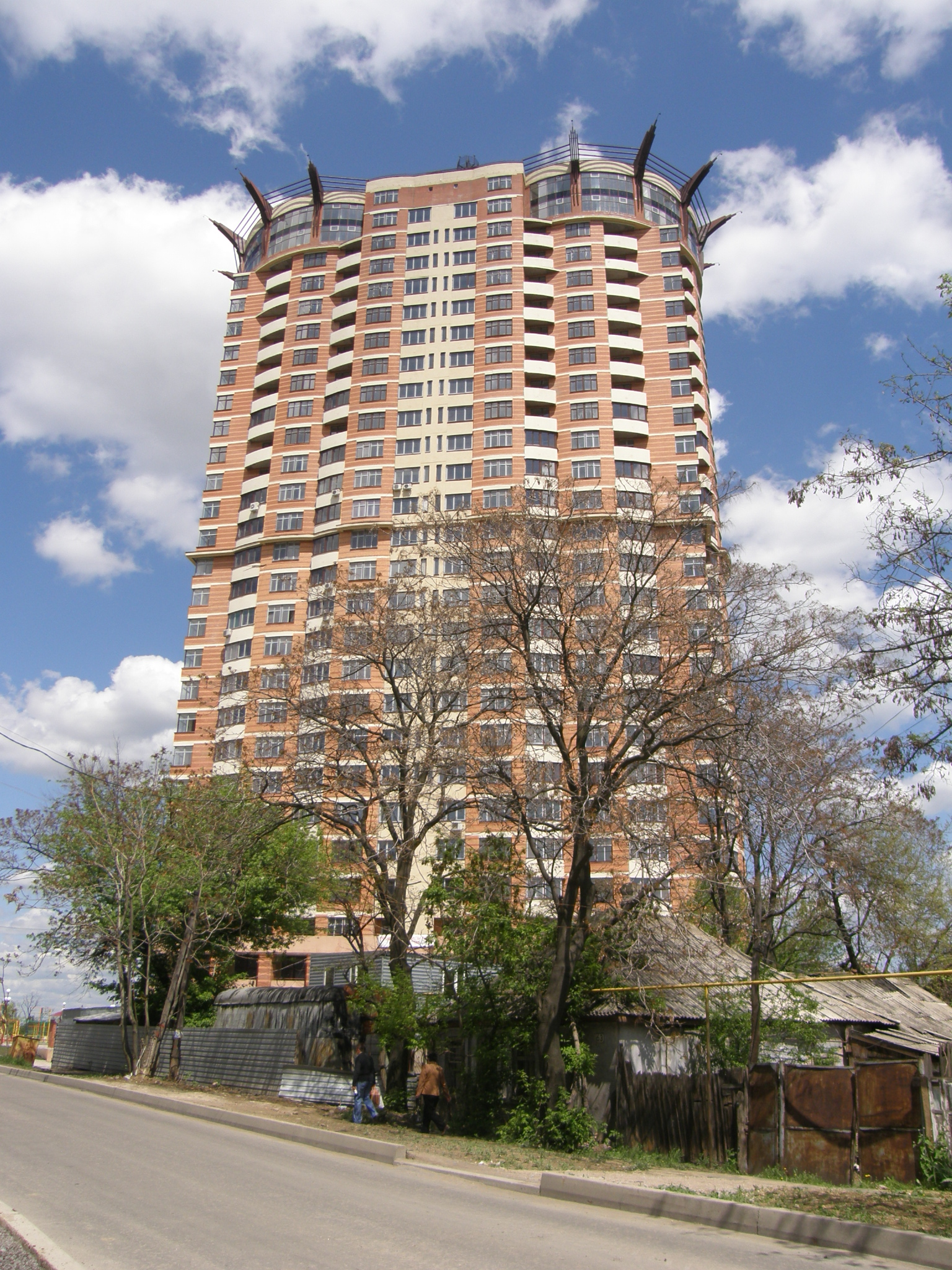
King's Tower, 2009

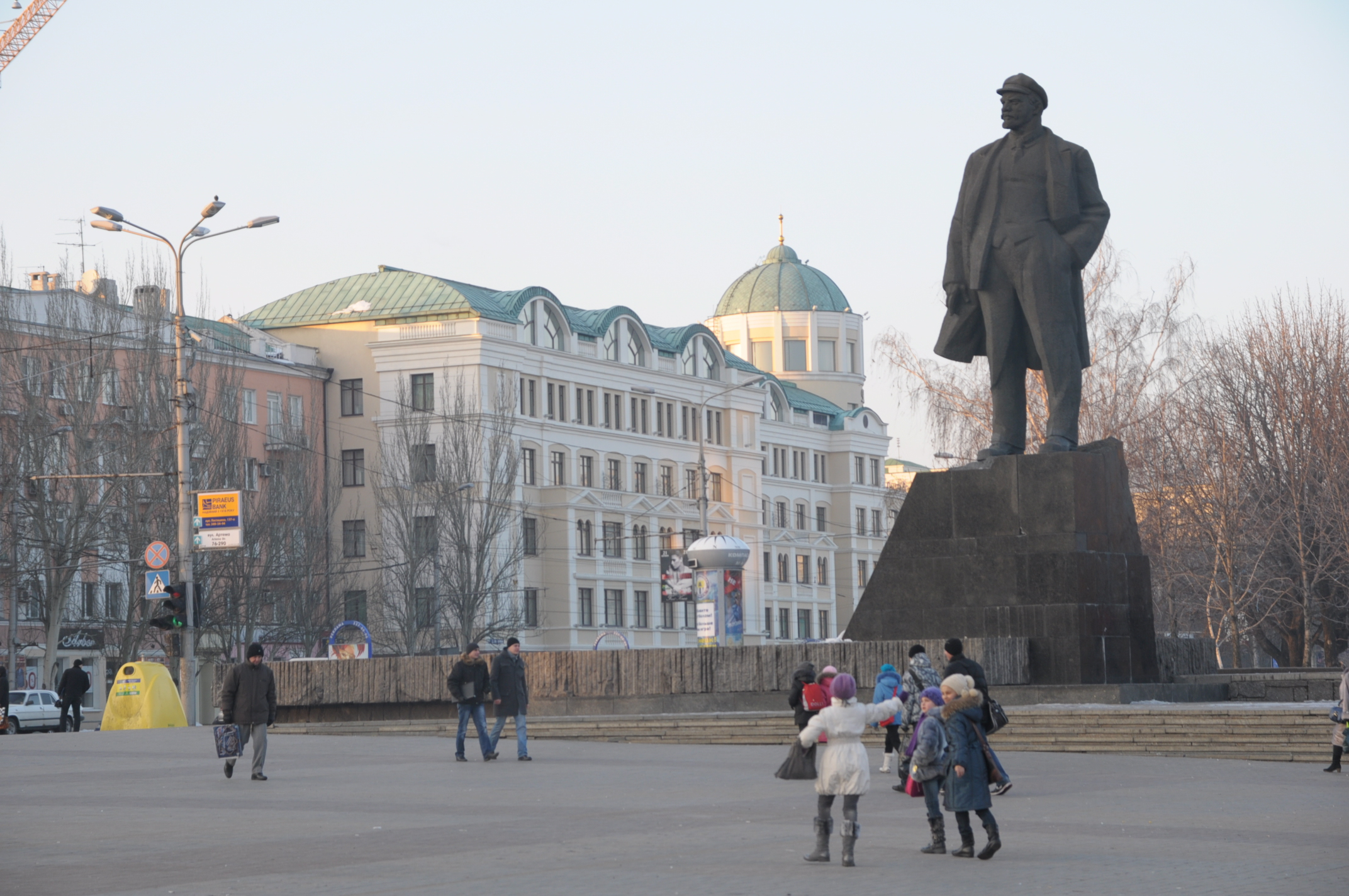
Lenin Square in 2010 with Lenin's monument and Donbass Palace

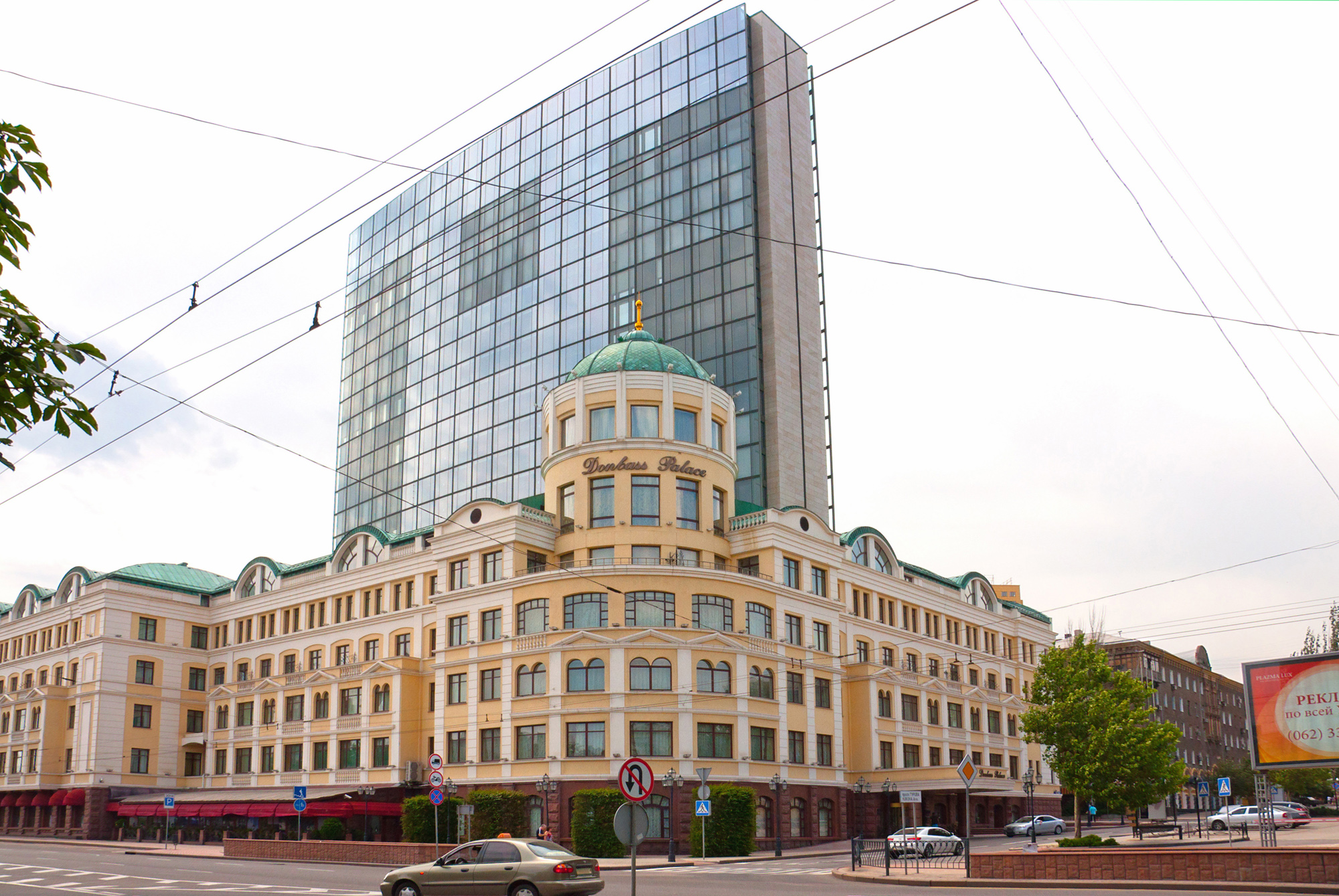
Hotel Donbass Palace, July 2014
