= Laryne =

Laryne (Ukrainian: Ларине) may refer to the following places in Ukraine:

- Laryne, Crimea, village in Dzhankoi Raion
- Laryne, Donetsk Oblast, urban-type settlement in Donetsk Municipality
