= Laryne, Crimea =

Laryne
- Village
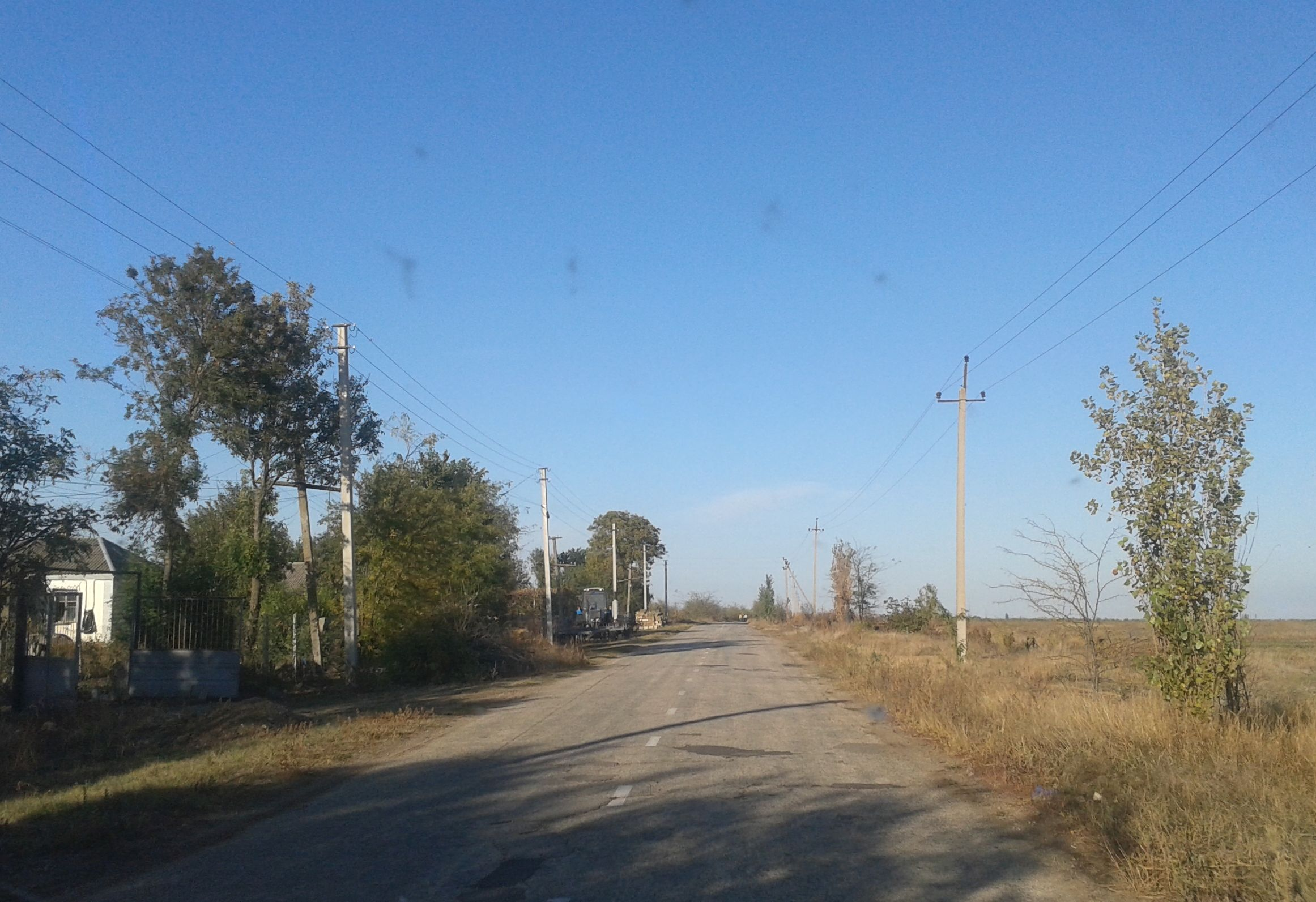

- Location within Crimea
- Coordinates: 45°33′05″N 34°31′30″E
- Country: Disputed: Ukraine (de jure); Russia (de facto)
- Region: (Autonomous Republic of Crimea) Crimea^{1}
- Municipality: Dzhankoi
- Elevation: 28 m (92 ft)

Population
  - Total: 292
- Time zone: UTC+4 (MSK)
- ^{1} Autonomous Republic of Crimea (de jure) or Republic of Crimea (de facto), depending on jurisdiction.

Laryne (Russian: Ларино; Ukrainian: Ларине; Crimean Tatar: Larino) is a village located in Dzhankoi Raion, Crimea. Population: 292 (2014 Census).

== See also ==
- Dzhankoi Raion
