= Administrative divisions of Donetsk Oblast =

Donetsk Oblast is subdivided into districts (raions) which are further subdivided into territorial communities (hromadas).

== Current ==
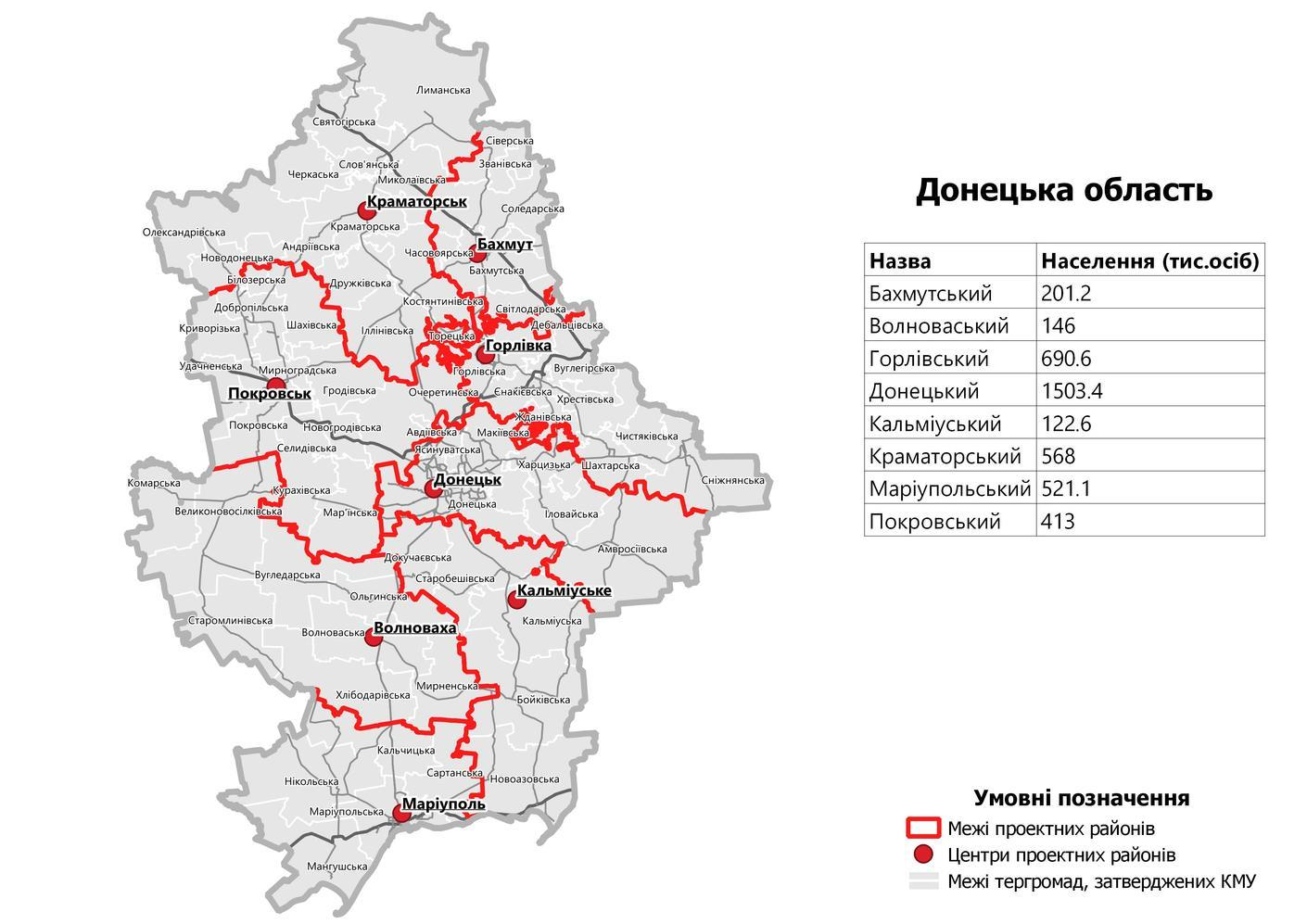
Raions of Donetsk Oblast as of August 2020.

On 18 July 2020, the number of districts was reduced to eight. This includes territories not under control of Ukrainian government, where the old territorial division is in use. The eight districts are:

1. Bakhmut (Бахмутський район), the center is in the city of Bakhmut;
2. Donetsk (Донецький район), the center is in the city of Donetsk;
3. Horlivka (Горлівський район), the center is in the city of Horlivka;
4. Kalmiuske (Кальміуський район), the center is in the city of Kalmiuske;
5. Kramatorsk (Краматорський район), the center is in the city of Kramatorsk;
6. Mariupol (Маріупольський район), the center is in the city of Mariupol;
7. Pokrovsk (Покровський район), the center is in the city of Pokrovsk;
8. Volnovakha (Волноваський район), the center is in the city of Volnovakha.

Donetsk Oblast
As of January 1, 2022
Number of districts (райони)	8
Number of hromadas (громади)	66

== Administrative divisions until 2020 ==
Raions of Donetsk Oblast in 2013. The city of Donetsk is in dark blue.

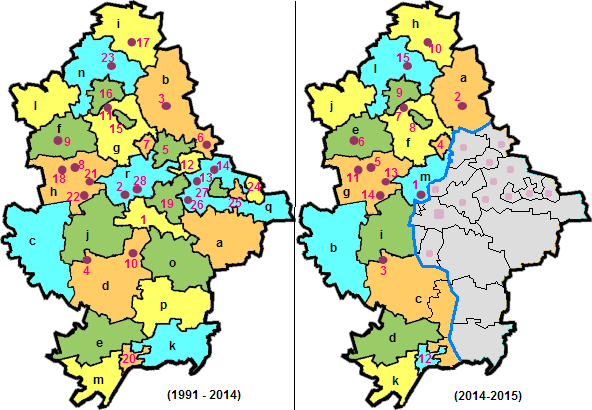
Raions and cities of Donetsk Oblast in 1991–2014 and 2015. The grey area is not under control of the central government of Ukraine. Districts (raions): a – Amvrosiivka, b – Bakhmut, c – Velyka Novosilka, d – Volnovakha, e – Nikolske, f – Dobropillia, g – Kostiantynivka, h – Pokrovsk, i – Lyman, j – Marinka, k – Novoazovsk, l – Oleksandrivka, m – Manhush, n – Sloviansk, o – Starobesheve, p – Telmanove, q – Shakhtarsk, r – Yasynuvata, Cities of regional significance: 1 – Donetsk, 2 – Avdiivka, 3 – Bakhmut, 4 – Vuhledar, 5 – Horlivka, 6 – Debaltseve, 7 – Toretsk, 8 – Myrnohrad, 9 – Dobropillia, 10 – Dokuchaievsk, 11 – Druzhkivka, 12 – Yenakiieve, 13 – Zhdanivka, 14 – Kirovske, 15 – Kostiantynivka, 16 – Kramatorsk, 17 – Lyman, 18 – Pokrovsk, 19 – Makiivka, 20 – Mariupol, 21 – Novohrodivka, 22 – Selydove, 23 – Sloviansk, 24 – Snizhne, 25 – Torez, 26 – Khartsyzk, 27 – Shakhtarsk, 28 – Yasynuvata

Until 2020, Donetsk Oblast was subdivided into 46 regions: 18 districts (raions) and 28 city municipalities (mis'krada or misto), officially known as "territories governed by city councils". In 2014, the War in Donbas started, and whereas some areas are controlled by the central Ukrainian government, others are under control of separatists representing Donetsk People's Republic. The pro-Ukrainian government of the oblast was relocated from Donetsk to Mariupol.

- Cities under the oblast's jurisdiction:
  - Donetsk municipality
    - Cities under the city's jurisdiction:
      - Donetsk (Донецьк), the administrative center of the oblast
      - Mospyne (Моспине)
    - Urban-type settlements under the city's jurisdiction:
      - Horbachevo-Mykhaylivka (Горбачево-Михайлівка)
      - Laryne (Ларине)
  - Avdiivka (Авдіївка)
  - Bakhmut municipality
    - Cities under the city's jurisdiction:
      - Bakhmut (Бахмут), formerly Artemivsk
    - Urban-type settlements under the city's jurisdiction:
      - Krasna Hora (Красна Гора)
  - Debaltseve (Дебальцеве)
  - Dobropillia municipality
    - Cities under the city's jurisdiction:
      - Bilozerske (Білозерське)
      - Bilytske (Білицьке)
      - Dobropillia (Добропілля)
    - Urban-type settlements under the city's jurisdiction:
      - Novodonetske (Новодонецьке)
      - Vodianske (Водянське)
  - Dokuchaievsk municipality
    - Cities under the city's jurisdiction:
      - Dokuchaievsk (Докучаєвськ)
  - Druzhkivka municipality
    - Cities under the city's jurisdiction:
      - Druzhkivka (Дружківка)
    - Urban-type settlements under the city's jurisdiction:
      - Novohryhorivka (Новогригорівка)
      - Novomykolaivka (Новомиколаївка)
      - Oleksiievo-Druzhkivka (Олексієво-Дружківка)
      - Raiske (Райське)
  - Horlivka municipality
    - Cities under the city's jurisdiction:
      - Horlivka (Горлівка)
    - Urban-type settlements under the city's jurisdiction:
      - Holmivskyi (Гольмівський)
      - Panteleimonivka (Пантелеймонівка)
  - Khartsyzk municipality
    - Cities under the city's jurisdiction:
      - Ilovaisk (Іловайськ)
      - Khartsyzk (Харцизьк)
      - Zuhres (Зугрес)
    - Urban-type settlements under the city's jurisdiction:
      - Hirne (Гірне)
      - Mykolaivka (Миколаївка)
      - Pokrovka (Покровка)
      - Shakhtne (Шахтне)
      - Shyroke (Широке)
      - Troitsko-Khartsyzsk (Троїцько-Харцизьк)
      - Voykove (Войкове)
      - Zuivka (Зуївка)
  - Kirovske (Кіровське)
  - Kostiantynivka (Костянтинівка)
  - Kramatorsk municipality
    - Cities under the city's jurisdiction:
      - Kramatorsk (Краматорськ)
    - Urban-type settlements under the city's jurisdiction:
      - Bilenke (Біленьке)
      - Komyshuvakha (Комишуваха)
      - Krasnotorka (Красноторка)
      - Malotaranivka (Малотаранівка)
      - Oleksandrivka (Олександрівка)
      - Shabelkivka (Шабельківка)
      - Sofiivka (Софіївка)
      - Yasna Poliana (Ясна Поляна)
      - Yasnohirka (Ясногірка)
  - Lyman municipality
    - Cities under the city's jurisdiction:
      - Lyman (Лиман), formerly Krasnyi Lyman
    - Urban-type settlements under the city's jurisdiction:
      - Drobysheve (Дробишеве)
      - Novoselivka (Новоселівка)
      - Yampil (Ямпіль)
      - Yarova (Ярова)
      - Zarichne (Зарiчне), formerly Kirovsk
  - Makiivka municipality
    - Cities under the city's jurisdiction:
      - Makiivka (Макіївка)
    - Urban-type settlements under the city's jurisdiction:
      - Hruzko-Lomivka (Грузько-Ломівка)
      - Hruzko-Zorianske (Грузько-Зорянське)
      - Huselske (Гусельське)
      - Kolosnykove (Колосникове)
      - Krasnyi Oktiabr (Красний Октябр)
      - Krynychna (Кринична)
      - Lisne (Лісне)
      - Maiak (Маяк)
      - Mezhove (Межове)
      - Nyzhnia Krynka (Нижня Кринка)
      - Proletarske (Пролетарське)
      - Sverdlove (Свердлове)
      - Velyke Orikhove (Велике Оріхове)
      - Vuhliar (Вугляр)
      - Vysoke (Високе)
      - Yasynivka (Ясинівка)
      - Zemlianky (Землянки)
  - Mariupol municipality
    - Cities under the city's jurisdiction:
      - Mariupol (Маріуполь)
    - Urban-type settlements under the city's jurisdiction:
      - Sartana (Сартана)
      - Staryi Krym (Старий Крим)
      - Talakivka (Талаківка)
  - Myrnohrad municipality
    - Cities under the city's jurisdiction:
      - Myrnohrad (Мирноград), formerly Dymytrov
  - Novohrodivka (Новогродівка)
  - Pokrovsk municipality
    - Cities under the city's jurisdiction:
      - Pokrovsk (Покровськ), formerly Krasnoarmiisk
      - Rodynske (Родинське)
    - Urban-type settlements under the city's jurisdiction:
      - Shevchenko (Шевченко)
  - Selydove municipality
    - Cities under the city's jurisdiction:
      - Hirnyk (Гірник)
      - Selydove (Селидове)
      - Ukrainsk (Українськ)
    - Urban-type settlements under the city's jurisdiction:
      - Hostre (Гостре)
      - Komyshivka (Комишівка)
      - Kurakhivka (Курахівка)
      - Tsukuryne (Цукурине)
      - Vyshneve (Вишневе)
  - Shakhtarsk municipality
    - Cities under the city's jurisdiction:
      - Shakhtarsk (Шахтарськ)
    - Urban-type settlements under the city's jurisdiction:
      - Kontarne (Контарне)
      - Moskovske (Московське)
      - Serdyte (Сердите)
      - Stizhkivske (Стіжківське)
  - Sloviansk municipality
    - Cities under the city's jurisdiction:
      - Sloviansk (Слов'янськ)
      - Sviatohirsk (Святогірськ)
  - Snizhne municipality
    - Cities under the city's jurisdiction:
      - Snizhne (Сніжне)
    - Urban-type settlements under the city's jurisdiction:
      - Andriivka (Андріївка)
      - Brazhyne (Бражине)
      - Hirnytske (Гірницьке)
      - Lymanchuk (Лиманчук)
      - Nykyforove (Никифорове)
      - Pervomaiske (Первомайське)
      - Pervomaiskyi (Первомайський)
      - Pobieda (Побєда)
      - Sieverne (Сєверне)
      - Zalisne (Залісне)
  - Toretsk municipality
    - Cities under the city's jurisdiction:
      - Toretsk (Торецк), formerly Dzerzhynsk
      - Zalizne (Залізне), formerly Artemove
    - Urban-type settlements under the city's jurisdiction:
      - Kurdiumivka (Курдюмівка)
      - Nelipivka (Неліпівка)
      - Novhorodske (Новгородське)
      - Petrivka (Петрівка)
      - Pivdenne (Південне), formerly Leninske
      - Pivnichne (Північне), formerly Kirove
      - Shcherbynivka (Щербинівка)
  - Torez municipality
    - Cities under the city's jurisdiction:
      - Torez (Торез)
    - Urban-type settlements under the city's jurisdiction:
      - Pelahiivka (Пелагіївка)
      - Rozsypne (Розсипне)
  - Vuhledar (Вугледар)
  - Yasynuvata (Ясинувата)
  - Yenakiieve municipality
    - Cities under the city's jurisdiction:
      - Yenakiieve (Єнакієве)
      - Yunokomunarivsk (Юнокомунарівськ)
    - Urban-type settlements under the city's jurisdiction:
      - Druzhne (Дружне)
      - Karlo-Marksove (Карло-Марксове)
      - Korsun (Корсунь)
  - Zhdanivka municipality
    - Cities under the city's jurisdiction:
      - Zhdanivka (Жданівка)
    - Urban-type settlements under the city's jurisdiction:
      - Vilkhivka (Вільхівка)
- Districts (raions):
  - Amvrosiivka (Амвросіївський район)
    - Cities under the district's jurisdiction:
      - Amvrosiivka (Амвросіївка)
    - Urban-type settlements under the district's jurisdiction:
      - Kuteinykove (Кутейникове)
      - Novoamvrosiivske (Новоамвросіївське)
      - Voikovskyi (Войковський)
  - Bakhmut (Бахмутський район)
    - Cities under the district's jurisdiction:
      - Chasiv Yar (Часів Яр)
      - Siversk (Сіверськ)
      - Soledar (Соледар)
      - Svitlodarsk (Світлодарськ)
      - Vuhlehirsk (Вуглегірськ)
    - Urban-type settlements under the district's jurisdiction:
      - Bulavynske (Булавинське)
      - Luhanske (Луганське)
      - Myronivskyi (Миронівський)
      - Oleksandrivske (Олександрівське)
      - Olenivka (Оленівка)
      - Olkhovatka (Ольховатка)
      - Pryberezhne (Прибережне)
      - Zaitseve (Зайцеве)
  - Dobropillia (Добропільський район)
    - Urban-type settlements under the district's jurisdiction:
      - Sviatohorivka (Святогорівка)
  - Kostiantynivka (Костянтинівський район)
  - Manhush (Мангушський район), formerly Pershotravnevyi Raion
    - Urban-type settlements under the district's jurisdiction:
      - Manhush (Мангуш)
      - Yalta (Ялта)
  - Marinka (Мар'їнський район)
    - Cities under the district's jurisdiction:
      - Krasnohorivka (Красногорівка)
      - Kurakhove (Курахове)
      - Marinka (Мар'їнка)
    - Urban-type settlements under the district's jurisdiction:
      - Illinka (Іллінка)
      - Oleksandrivka (Олександрівка)
      - Staromykhailivka (Старомихайлівка)
  - Nikolske (Нікольський район), formerly Volodarske Raion
    - Urban-type settlements under the district's jurisdiction:
      - Nikolske (Нiкольське), formerly Volodarske
  - Novoazovsk (Новоазовський район)
    - Cities under the district's jurisdiction:
      - Novoazovsk (Новоазовськ)
    - Urban-type settlements under the district's jurisdiction:
      - Siedove (Сєдове)
  - Oleksandrivka (Олександрівський район)
    - Urban-type settlements under the district's jurisdiction:
      - Oleksandrivka (Олександрівка)
  - Pokrovsk (Покровський район), formerly Krasnoarmiisk Raion
    - Urban-type settlements under the district's jurisdiction:
      - Hrodivka (Гродівка)
      - Novoekonomichne (Новоекономічне)
      - Udachne (Удачне)
  - Shakhtarsk (Шахтарський район)
  - Sloviansk (Слов'янський район)
    - Cities under the district's jurisdiction:
      - Mykolaivka (Миколаївка)
    - Urban-type settlements under the district's jurisdiction:
      - Andriivka (Андріївка)
      - Bylbasivka (Билбасівка)
      - Cherkaske (Черкаське)
      - Donetske (Донецьке)
      - Raihorodok (Райгородок)
  - Starobesheve (Старобешівський район)
    - Cities under the district's jurisdiction:
      - Komsomolske (Комсомольське)
    - Urban-type settlements under the district's jurisdiction:
      - Novyi Svit (Новий Світ)
      - Starobesheve (Старобешеве)
  - Telmanove (Тельманівський район)
    - Urban-type settlements under the district's jurisdiction:
      - Telmanove (Тельманове)
  - Velyka Novosilka (Великоновосілківський район)
    - Urban-type settlements under the district's jurisdiction:
      - Velyka Novosilka (Велика Новосілка)
  - Volnovakha (Волноваський район)
    - Cities under the district's jurisdiction:
      - Volnovakha (Волноваха)
    - Urban-type settlements under the district's jurisdiction:
      - Andriivka (Андріївка)
      - Blahodatne (Благодатне)
      - Donske (Донське)
      - Hrafske (Графське), formerly Komsomolskyi
      - Myrne (Мирне)
      - Novotroitske (Новотроїцьке)
      - Olenivka (Оленівка)
      - Olhynka (Ольгинка)
      - Volodymyrivka (Володимирівка)
  - Yasynuvata (Ясинуватський район)
    - Urban-type settlements under the district's jurisdiction:
      - Keramik (Керамік)
      - Ocheretyne (Очеретине)
      - Verkhnotoretske (Верхньоторецьке)
      - Zhelanne (Желанне)
