= Urban-type settlements in Ukraine =

Type of administrative division

Urban-type settlement (Ukrainian: селище міського типу, romanized: selyshche miskoho typu) was a type of administrative division for urban-like human settlements in Ukraine from 24 October 1925 through 26 January 2024. Following the reform, this type of settlement was reduced to rural status and all urban-type settlements were renamed as settlements.

Per the Constitution of Ukraine, which was adopted in 1996, the only populated places listed are cities, settlements, and villages (Article 133). There is no mention of "urban-type settlements" in the current Constitution.

== History ==
In 1925, the designation of urban-type settlement was introduced into the classification system of the Soviet Union. This included the Ukrainian SSR, where it replaced the previous term "town" (Ukrainian: містечко, romanized: mistechko). In Crimea, this type of settlement appeared after its transfer to the Ukrainian SSR in 1954 and until then similar settlements were known as resort settlements or workers' settlements.

Ukrainian historian Oleksandr Androshchuk described the urban-type settlement as "a peculiar category of settlements [...] detached from the centuries-old history of urban settlement in Ukraine." The number of urban-type settlements in Ukraine increased steadily throughout the 20th century. There were 459 by 1940, 478 by 1950, 823 by 1960, 861 by 1970, 901 by 1980, and 927 by 1990. However, the newly created urban-type settlements often did not have significant differences from traditional villages, with many residents continuing to engage in agricultural lifestyles. Androshchuk notes that "during the first ten years of Soviet rule on the territory of modern Ukraine, three times more rural settlements were transferred to the category of urban-type settlements than in the previous 300 years", and argues that such a rapid change was doomed to be ineffective, as it was "not possible to force yesterday's peasant to wake up in the morning as a city dweller."

In the years after World War II, many urban-type settlements grew to the point that their statuses were upgraded to that of cities of district subordination, shrinking the former category and growing the latter. This included places like Katyk (now Shakhtarsk), Vatutine, Kivertsi, and Haivoron.

The largest wave of urban-type settlement creation took place in the late 1950s and early 1960s, when, according to Oleksandr Androshchuk in 2006, more than half of the urban-type settlements in existence were created. In 1957 alone, 125 settlements became urban-type settlements in Ukraine. A 1965 decree of the Presidium of the Supreme Soviet of the Ukrainian Soviet Socialist Republic further clarified the definition of an urban-type settlement, defining it as "a populated area around an industrial plant, construction site, railway junction, educational institution, research station, sanatorium, or other stationary medical or convalescent establishment that has state housing and over 2,000 residents, 60 percent of whom are wage or salaried workers or members of their families." It was also specified that a such settlement may have less than 2,000 people if it is expected to develop further and pass that number.

In 1981, the Presidium of the Verkhovna Rada of the Ukrainian SSR passed a resolution further specifying the definition of an urban-type settlement, and making it more clear how settlements could change their status.

Ukraine became independent in 1991, but retained the Soviet-era classifications of inhabited localities for a time. By July 2023, the number of urban-type settlements in the country had fallen to 881. On 24 October 2023, as part of wider decommunization in independent Ukraine, Ukrainian President Volodymyr Zelenskyy signed Law No. 8263, which abolished the concept of "urban-type settlement" in Ukraine. He stated that it was to facilitate "de-Sovietization of the procedure for solving certain issues of the administrative and territorial system of Ukraine." The law was set to come into effect three months after its signing, which was on 26 January 2024. This was part of administrative reforms for decentralization intended to help reduce corruption.

== List ==
Below is the list of all urban-type settlements that existed in Ukraine.

During the Russo-Ukrainian War, Russia has illegally occupied parts of Ukraine. Since 2014, it has occupied the entire Crimean peninsula, as well as parts of Donetsk Oblast and Luhansk Oblast, and since 2022, it has additionally occupied significant portions of Kharkiv Oblast, Kherson Oblast, and Zaporizhzhia Oblast. Russia does not recognize Ukraine's right to make legal changes to the statuses of localities in the territories it claims, so whether a settlement is considered an urban-type settlement may differ between the laws of the two countries. For simplicity, this list only gives the statuses of places according to Ukrainian law.

=== Autonomous Republic of Crimea and Sevastopol ===
- Aeroflotskyi
- Ahrarne
- Azovske
- Baherove
- Berehove
- Chornomorske
- Foros
- Haspra
- Gurzuf
- Holuba Zatoka
- Hresivskyi
- Hvardiiske
- Kacha (1938–2024)
- Katsiveli
- Kirovske
- Koktebel
- Komsomolske
- Koreiz
- Krasnohvardiiske
- Krasnokamianka
- Kuibysheve
- Kurortne
- Kurpaty
- Lenine (1957–2024) (Note: Also known as Yedy-Kuiu or Yedi Quyu.)
- Livadiia
- Masandra
- Molodizhne
- Mykolaivka
- Myrnyi
- Nauchnyi
- Nikita
- Novofedorivka
- Novoozerne
- Novoselivske
- Novyi Svit
- Nyzhnohirskyi
- Oktiabrske
- Ordzhonikidze
- Oreanda
- Parkove
- Partenit
- Pervomaiske
- Ponyzivka
- Poshtove
- Prymorskyi
- Rozdolne
- Sanatorne
- Shchebetovka
- Simeiz
- Sokolyne
- Sovietske
- Sovietskyi
- Vidradne
- Vilne
- Voskhod
- Vynohradne
- Zaozerne
- Zuya

=== Cherkasy Oblast ===
- Babanka
- Buky
- Chornobai
- Drabiv
- Irdyn
- Katerynopil
- Lysianka
- Mankivka
- Stebliv
- Tsvitkove
- Tsybuliv
- Verkhniachka
- Vilshana (1965–2024)
- Yerky

=== Chernihiv Oblast ===
- Berezna
- Desna
- Dihtiari
- Dobrianka
- Druzhba
- Honcharivske
- Kholmy
- Korop
- Kozelets
- Kulykivka
- Ladan
- Liubech
- Losynivka
- Lynovytsia
- Makoshyne
- Mala Divytsia
- Mykhailo-Kotsiubynske
- Olyshivka
- Parafiivka
- Ponornytsia
- Radul
- Ripky
- Sedniv
- Sosnytsia
- Sribne
- Talalaivka
- Varva
- Zamhlai

=== Chernivtsi Oblast ===
- Berehomet (1963–2024)
- Hlyboka (1956–2024)
- Kelmentsi (1960–2024)
- Kostryzhivka (1959–2024)
- Krasnoilsk (1968–2024)
- Luzhany (1968–2024)
- Nepolokivtsi (1968–2024)
- Putyla

=== Dnipropetrovsk Oblast ===
- Auly
- Bozhedarivka
- Chaplyne
- Cherkaske
- Chervonohryhorivka
- Chortomlyk
- Demuryne
- Dniprovske
- Hirnytske
- Hubynykha
- Hvardiiske
- Ilarionove
- Karnaukhivka
- Khrystoforivka
- Krynychky
- Kurylivka
- Lykhivka
- Mahdalynivka
- Marivka
- Melioratyvne
- Mezhova
- Mykolaivka
- Novomykolaivka
- Novopokrovka
- Obukhivka
- Petropavlivka
- Petrykivka
- Pokrovske
- Prosiana
- Pysmenne
- Radushne
- Rozdory
- Sad
- Shyroke
- Slavhorod
- Slobozhanske
- Sofiivka
- Solone
- Tomakivka
- Tsarychanka
- Vasylkivka
- Vyshneve
- Yurivka
- Zaliznychne

=== Donetsk Oblast ===
- Andriivka, Volnovakha Raion
- Andriivka, Horlivka Raion
- Andriivka, Kramatorsk Raion
- Bilenke
- Blahodatne
- Boikivske (1971–2024) (Note: Also known as Telmanove.)
- Brazhyne
- Bulavynske
- Bylbasivka
- Cherkaske
- Donetske
- Donske
- Drobysheve
- Druzhne
- Hirne
- Hirnytske
- Holmivskyi
- Horbachevo-Mykhaylivka
- Hostre
- Hrafske
- Hrodivka
- Hruzko-Lomivka
- Hruzko-Zorianske
- Huselske
- Illinka
- Keramik
- Kholodne
- Kolosnykove
- Komyshivka
- Komyshuvakha
- Kontarne
- Korsun
- Krasna Hora (1964–2024)
- Krasnotorka
- Krynychna
- Kurakhivka
- Kurdiumivka (1957–2024)
- Kuteinykove
- Laryne
- Lisne
- Luhanske
- Lymanchuk
- Lypske (1957–2024) (Note: Also known as Krasnyi Oktiabr.)
- Maiak
- Malotaranivka
- Manhush
- Mezhove
- Moskovske
- Mykolaivka
- Myrne
- Myronivskyi
- Nelipivka
- New York (1938–2024) (Note: Also transliterated as Niu-York. Its name was Novhorodske from 1951 until 2021.)
- Novoamvrosiivske
- Novodonetske
- Novoekonomichne
- Novohryhorivka
- Novomykolaivka
- Novoselivka
- Novotroitske
- Novyi Svit
- Nykyforove (1957–2024)
- Nyzhnia Krynka
- Ocheretyne
- Oleksandrivka, Donetsk Raion
- Oleksandrivka, Oleksandrivka settlement hromada
- Oleksandrivka, Kramatorsk urban hromada
- Oleksandrivske
- Oleksiievo-Druzhkivka
- Olenivka, Bakhmut Raion
- Olenivka, Kalmiuske Raion
- Olhynka
- Olkhovatka
- Panteleimonivka
- Pelahiivka
- Pervomaiske
- Pervomaiskyi
- Petrivka
- Piatypillia
- Pivdenne (1957–2024) (Note: It was known as Leninske until 2016.)
- Pivnichne
- Pobieda
- Pokrovka
- Pryberezhne
- Raihorodok
- Raiske
- Rozsypne
- Sartana
- Shcherbynivka
- Serdyte
- Shabelkivka
- Shakhtne
- Shevchenko
- Shyroke
- Siedove
- Sieverne
- Siversk (until 1961) (Note: It was known as Yama during this time. Yama lost urban-type settlement status because it was granted city status in 1961.)
- Sofiivka, Horlivka Raion
- Sofiivka, Kramatorsk Raion
- Starobesheve
- Staromykhailivka
- Staryi Krym
- Stizhkivske
- Sviatohorivka
- Talakivka
- Troitsko-Khartsyzsk
- Tsukuryne
- Udachne
- Velyka Novosilka
- Velyke Orikhove
- Verkhnotoretske
- Vilkhivka
- Vodianske
- Voikove
- Voikovskyi
- Volodarske
- Volodymyrivka
- Vuhliar
- Vyshneve
- Vysoke
- Yalta
- Yampil
- Yarova
- Yasna Poliana
- Yasnohirka
- Yasynivka
- Zaitseve
- Zalisne
- Zarichne
- Zemlianky
- Zhelanne
- Zuivka

=== Ivano-Frankivsk Oblast ===
- Bilshivtsi
- Bohorodchany
- Broshniv-Osada
- Bukachivtsi
- Bytkiv
- Chernelytsia
- Deliatyn
- Hvizdets
- Kuty
- Lanchyn
- Lysets
- Obertyn
- Otyniia
- Pechenizhyn
- Perehinske
- Rozhniativ
- Solotvyn
- Verkhovyna (1962–2024)
- Voinyliv
- Vorokhta (1960–2024)
- Vyhoda
- Yabluniv
- Yezupil
- Zabolotiv

=== Kharkiv Oblast ===
- Andriivka
- Babai
- Berezivka
- Bezliudivka
- Bilyi Kolodiaz
- Birky
- Blyzniuky
- Borova
- Budy
- Chervonyi Donets
- Chkalovske
- Dvorichna
- Eskhar
- Huty
- Kehychivka
- Khorosheve
- Kivsharivka
- Kochetok
- Kolomak
- Korotych
- Kostiantynivka (until 2021)
- Koviahy
- Kozacha Lopan
- Krasnokutsk
- Krasnopavlivka
- Kulynychi
- Kupiansk-Vuzlovyi
- Mala Danylivka
- Malynivka
- Manchenky
- Nova Vodolaha
- Novopokrovka
- Orilka
- Paniutyne
- Pechenihy
- Peresichne
- Pisochyn
- Pokotylivka
- Prudianka
- Prykolotne
- Rohan
- Sakhnovshchyna
- Savyntsi
- Sharivka
- Shevchenkove
- Slatyne
- Slobozhanske
- Solonytsivka
- Staryi Merchyk
- Staryi Saltiv
- Utkivka
- Vasyshcheve
- Velykyi Burluk
- Vilcha
- Vilshany
- Vvedenka
- Vysokyi
- Zachepylivka
- Zidky
- Zolochiv

=== Kherson Oblast ===
- Antonivka
- Arkhanhelske
- Askania-Nova
- Bila Krynytsia
- Bilozerka
- Brylivka
- Chaplynka
- Dnipriany
- Hornostaivka
- Ivanivka
- Kalanchak
- Kalynivske
- Karierne
- Komyshany
- Kozatske
- Lazurne
- Liubymivka
- Myrne
- Naddniprianske
- Nova Maiachka
- Novooleksiivka
- Novotroitske
- Novovorontsovka
- Nyzhni Sirohozy
- Partyzany
- Syvaske
- Velyka Lepetykha
- Velyka Oleksandrivka
- Verkhnii Rohachyk
- Vysokopillia
- Zelenivka

=== Khmelnytskyi Oblast ===
- Antoniny
- Bazaliia
- Bilohiria
- Chemerivtsi
- Chornyi Ostriv
- Dunaivtsi
- Hrytsiv
- Letychiv
- Lozove
- Medzhybizh
- Narkevychi
- Nova Ushytsia
- Poninka
- Sataniv
- Smotrych
- Stara Syniava
- Stara Ushytsia
- Teofipol
- Viitivtsi
- Vinkivtsi
- Vovkovyntsi
- Yampil
- Yarmolyntsi
- Zakupne

=== Kyiv Oblast ===
- Babyntsi
- Baryshivka
- Borodianka
- Borova
- Chabany
- Doslidnytske
- Dymer
- Hlevakha
- Hostomel
- Hrebinky
- Ivankiv
- Kalynivka, Brovary Raion
- Kalynivka, Vasylkiv Raion
- Kalyta
- Klavdiievo-Tarasove
- Kodra
- Kotsiubynske
- Kozhanka
- Kozyn
- Krasiatychi
- Makariv
- Nemishaieve
- Piskivka
- Rokytne
- Stavyshche
- Terezyne
- Velyka Dymerka
- Volodarka
- Vorzel
- Zghurivka

=== Kirovohrad Oblast ===
- Balakhivka
- Dobrovelychkivka
- Holovanivsk
- Kapitanivka
- Kompaniivka
- Lisove
- Molodizhne
- Nova Praha
- Nove
- Novhorodka
- Novoarkhanhelsk
- Oleksandriiske
- Oleksandrivka
- Onufriivka
- Pantaivka
- Pavlysh
- Petrove
- Pobuzke
- Pryiutivka
- Salkove
- Smoline
- Ustynivka
- Vilshanka
- Vlasivka
- Yelyzavethradka
- Zavallia
- Znamianka Druha

=== Luhansk Oblast ===
- Bairachky
- Bile
- Bilohorivka
- Bilokurakyne
- Bilolutsk
- Bilorichenskyi
- Bilovodsk
- Biriukove
- Bokovo-Platove
- Borivske
- Buhaivka
- Buran
- Cheliuskinets
- Chornukhyne
- Donetskyi
- Dubivskyi
- Dzerzhynskyi
- Fashchivka, Alchevsk Raion
- Fashchivka, Antratsyt Raion
- Fedorivka
- Hannivka
- Heorhiivka
- Hirne
- Hirnyk
- Hlybokyi
- Horodyshche
- Hrushove
- Yesaulivka
- Ivanivka
- Izvaryne
- Kalininskyi
- Kalynove
- Kamiane
- Katerynivka
- Khrustalne
- Klenovyi
- Kniahynivka
- Komisarivka
- Komsomolskyi (Note: Also known as Dubove.)
- Komyshuvakha
- Krasnodarskyi
- Krasnorichenske
- Krasnyi Kut
- Kripenskyi
- Krynychanske
- Kypuche (1938–1964) (Note: It was known as Artemivsk during this time. Artemivsk lost urban-type settlement status because it was granted city status in 1964.)
- Lomuvatka
- Lotykove
- Lozivskyi
- Lozno-Oleksandrivka
- Malomykolaivka
- Maloriazantseve
- Mariia
- Markivka
- Metiolkine
- Milove
- Mykhailivka, Alchevsk Raion
- Mykhailivka, Rovenky Raion
- Myrna Dolyna
- Myrne
- Naholno-Tarasivka
- Novoaidar
- Novodarivka
- Novooleksandrivka
- Novopskov
- Novosvitlivka
- Novotoshkivske
- Nyzhnia Duvanka
- Nyzhnie
- Nyzhnii Naholchyk
- Pavlivka
- Petropavlivka
- Proletarskyi
- Rodakove
- Sadovo-Khrustalnenskyi
- Seleznivka
- Sentianivka
- Shakhtarske
- Shchotove
- Shterivka
- Sievernyi
- Sievero-Hundorivskyi
- Simeykyne
- Slovianoserbsk
- Sofiivskyi
- Stanytsia Luhanska
- Syrotyne
- Talove
- Tatsyne
- Teple
- Toshkivka
- Troitske
- Tsentralnyi
- Uralo-Kavkaz
- Uspenka
- Valianivske
- Velykokamianka
- Velykyi Loh
- Verhulivka
- Verkhnii Naholchyk
- Volodarsk
- Voronove
- Vovchoiarivka
- Vrubivka
- Vrubivskyi
- Yashchykove
- Yasenivskyi
- Yurivka
- Yuzhna Lomuvatka
- Zaporizhzhia

=== Lviv Oblast ===
- Borynia
- Briukhovychi
- Dashava
- Dobrotvir
- Dubliany
- Hirnyk
- Hnizdychiv
- Ivano-Frankove
- Krakovets
- Krasne
- Kulykiv
- Lopatyn
- Maheriv
- Medenychi
- Nemyriv
- Novi Strilyscha
- Novyi Kalyniv
- Novyi Yarychiv
- Nyzhankovychi
- Olesko
- Pidbuzh
- Pidkamin
- Pomoriany
- Rozdil
- Rudne
- Shchyrets
- Shklo
- Skhidnytsia
- Slavske
- Stara Sil
- Velykyi Liubin
- Verkhnie Synovydne
- Zapytiv
- Zhuravno
- Zhvyrka

=== Mykolaiv Oblast ===
- Arbuzynka
- Berezanka
- Bereznehuvate
- Bratske
- Domanivka
- Kazanka
- Kostiantynivka
- Kryve Ozero
- Oleksandrivka
- Olshanske
- Pervomaiske
- Pidhorodna
- Tokarivka
- Veselynove
- Voskresenske
- Vradiivka
- Yelanets

=== Odesa Oblast ===
- Avanhard
- Berezyne
- Borodino
- Chornomorske
- Dobroslav
- Ivanivka
- Khlibodarske
- Liubashivka (1957–2024)
- Lymanske
- Mykolaivka
- Novi Biliari
- Okny
- Oleksandrivka
- Ovidiopol
- Petrivka
- Radisne
- Raukhivka
- Sarata
- Savran
- Serhiivka
- Serpneve
- Shyriaieve
- Slobidka
- Suvorove
- Tairove
- Tarutyne
- Tsebrykove
- Velyka Mykhailivka
- Velykodolynske
- Zakharivka
- Zatoka
- Zatyshshia
- Zelenohirske

=== Poltava Oblast ===
- Bilyky
- Chornukhy
- Chutove
- Dykanka
- Hoholeve
- Hradyzk
- Komyshnia
- Kotelva
- Kozelschyna
- Mashivka
- Nova Haleshchyna
- Novi Sanzhary
- Novoorzhytske
- Opishnia
- Orzhytsia
- Reshetylivka
- Romodan
- Semenivka
- Shyshaky
- Skorokhodove
- Velyka Bahachka

=== Rivne Oblast ===
- Demydivka
- Hoshcha
- Klesiv
- Klevan
- Kvasyliv
- Mizoch
- Mlyniv
- Orzhiv
- Rafalivka
- Rokytne
- Smyha
- Sosnove
- Stepan
- Tomashhorod
- Tuchyn
- Volodymyrets
- Zarichne

=== Sumy Oblast ===
- Chupakhivka
- Duboviazivka
- Esman
- Khotin
- Krasnopillia
- Kyrykivka
- Lypova Dolyna
- Mykolaivka
- Nedryhailiv
- Nyzy
- Shalyhyne
- Stepanivka
- Svesa
- Terny
- Uhroidy
- Ulianivka
- Velyka Pysarivka
- Voronizh
- Yampil
- Znob-Novhorodske

=== Ternopil Oblast ===
- Druzhba
- Hrymailiv
- Husiatyn
- Koropets
- Kozliv
- Kozova
- Melnytsia-Podilska
- Mykulyntsi
- Pidvolochysk
- Skala-Podilska
- Tovste
- Velyka Berezovytsia
- Velyki Birky
- Vyshnivets
- Zaliztsi
- Zavodske
- Zolotyi Potik

=== Vinnytsia Oblast ===
- Brailiv
- Bratslav
- Brodetske
- Chechelnyk
- Chernivtsi
- Dashiv
- Desna
- Hlukhivtsi
- Kopaihorod
- Kryzhopil
- Kyrnasivka
- Lityn
- Murovani Kurylivtsi
- Orativ
- Pischanka
- Rudnytsia
- Shpykiv
- Stryzhavka
- Sutysky
- Sytkivtsi
- Teplyk
- Tomashpil
- Trostianets
- Turbiv
- Tyvriv
- Vapniarka
- Vendychany
- Voronovytsia
- Zaliznychne

=== Volyn Oblast ===
- Blahodatne
- Dubyshche
- Holoby
- Holovne
- Ivanychi
- Kolky
- Liubeshiv
- Liublynets
- Lokachi
- Lukiv
- Manevychi
- Marianivka
- Olyka
- Ratne
- Rokyni
- Senkevychivka
- Shatsk
- Stara Vyzhivka
- Torchyn
- Tsuman
- Turiisk
- Zabolottia

=== Zakarpattia Oblast ===
- Batiovo
- Bushtyno
- Chynadiiovo
- Dubove
- Kobyletska Poliana
- Kolchyno
- Korolevo
- Mizhhiria
- Serednie
- Solotvyno
- Teresva
- Ust-Chorna
- Velykyi Bereznyi
- Velykyi Bychkiv
- Volovets
- Vylok
- Vyshkovo
- Yasinia
- Zhdeniievo

=== Zaporizhzhia Oblast ===
- Andriivka
- Balabyne
- Chernihivka
- Kamiane
- Kamianka
- Komyshuvakha (1957–2024)
- Komysh-Zoria
- Kushuhum
- Kyrylivka
- Malokaterynivka
- Mykhailivka
- Myrne
- Novomykolaivka
- Novovasylivka
- Pryazovske
- Prymorsk (1938–1967) (Note: It was known as Nohaisk until 1964.)
- Pryshyb
- Rozivka
- Stepnohirsk
- Ternuvate
- Vesele (1957–2024)
- Yakymivka
- Zaliznychne

=== Zhytomyr Oblast ===
- Bila Krynytsia
- Brusyliv
- Buchmany
- Bykivka
- Cherniakhiv
- Chervone
- Chopovychi
- Dibrova
- Dovbysh
- Druzhba
- Holovyne
- Horodnytsia
- Hranitne
- Hryshkivtsi
- Huiva
- Irshansk
- Ivanopil
- Kamianyi Brid
- Kornyn
- Liubar
- Luhyny
- Marianivka
- Myroliubiv
- Myropil
- Narodychi
- Nova Borova
- Novi Bilokorovychi
- Novohuivynske
- Novoozerianka
- Ozerne
- Pershotravensk
- Pershotravneve
- Polianka
- Popilnia
- Pulyny
- Romaniv
- Ruzhyn
- Vakulenchuk
- Velyki Korovyntsi
- Khoroshiv
- Yablunets
- Yemilchyne

== See also ==
- List of places named after people#Ukraine
- Administrative divisions of Ukraine
- Raions of Ukraine
- List of cities in Ukraine
- List of hromadas of Ukraine
- List of urban-type settlements in Belarus

== Bibliography ==
- Androshchuk, Oleksandr (2006). "Міські поселення в системі територіального устрою УРСР 40-60-х років XX ст" (PDF).
