= Vuhlehirsk urban hromada =

Vuhlehirsk urban hromada Вуглегірська міська громада
- Hromada
- Interactive map of Vuhlehirsk urban hromada
- Country: Ukraine
- Oblast: Donetsk
- Raion: Horlivka
- Settlements: 16
- Cities: 1
- Rural settlements: 9
- Villages: 1
- Towns: 5

Vuhlehirsk urban hromada (Ukrainian: Вуглегірська міська громада) is a hromada of Ukraine, located in Horlivka Raion, Donetsk Oblast. Its administrative center is the city Vuhlehirsk.

The hromada contains 16 settlements: 1 city (Vuhlehirsk), 5 urban-type settlements (Bulavynske, Oleksandrivske, Olenivka, Olkhovatka, and Pryberezhne), 1 village (Vesela Dolyna), and 9 rural-type settlements:

- Bulavyne
- Hrozne
- Danilov
- Illinka
- Kamianka
- Kayutine
- Ridkodub
- Savelyvka
- Stupakove

== See also ==
- List of hromadas of Ukraine
