= List of cities in Donetsk Oblast =

Location of cities in Donetsk Oblast, with red dots indicating Russian-occupied cities, green dots indicating Ukrainian-controlled cities and the red-green dots indicating the ongoing partial occupation of the cities.

There are 52 populated places in Donetsk Oblast, Ukraine, that have been officially granted city status (Ukrainian: місто, romanized: misto) by the Verkhovna Rada, the country's parliament. Settlements with more than 10,000 people are eligible for city status, although the status is typically also granted to settlements of historical or regional importance. As of 5 December 2001, the date of the first and only official census in the country since independence, (Note: As of 11 July 2023) the most populous city in the oblast was the regional capital, Donetsk, with a population of 1,016,194 people, while the least populous city was Sviatohirsk, with 5,136 people. The most recent settlement to receive city status is Mykolaivka, which was granted the status by the Verkhovna Rada on 18 November 2003.

From independence in 1991 to 2020, 28 cities in the oblast were designated as cities of regional significance (municipalities), which had self-government under city councils, while the oblast's remaining 24 cities were located in 18 raions (districts) as cities of district significance, which are subordinated to the governments of the raions. On 18 July 2020, an administrative reform abolished and merged the oblast's raions and cities of regional significance into eight new, expanded raions. (Note: The initial administrative reform laws passed in 2020 were not de jure enacted at the time for territories controlled by separatist forces during the Donbas war due to a provision within the laws delaying the creation of new subdivisions in those territories until the Ukrainian government regained control of them at some indeterminate future date. On 7 September 2023, an amendment to the original law entered into force which created the new subdivisions for all territories from that date, thereby making them fully legally in effect for the whole oblast since 2023.) The eight raions that make up the oblast are Bakhmut, Donetsk, Horlivka, Kalmiuske, Kramatorsk, Mariupol, Pokrovsk, and Volnovakha. (Note: Due to the occupation by separatist forces of the Donetsk, Horlivka, and Kalmiuske raions at the time of the 2020 administrative reform, the three raions have only de jure status while de facto Russian officials instead use the raions and cities of regional significance from before the 2020 reform. In new territories occupied in the oblast since 24 February 2022, Russian appointed officials have also imposed the use of the pre-reform administrative divisions.) After the enactment of decommunization laws, ten cities within the oblast were renamed in 2016 for their former names' connection to people, places, events, and organizations associated with the Soviet Union. (Note: Due to the occupation by separatist forces of Bunhe, Chystiakove, Kalmiuske, and Khrestivka at the time of the 2016 renaming, the four cities' new names have only de jure status while de facto Russian officials continue to use the pre-2016 names. In the cities occupied since 24 February 2022, Russian appointed officials have also imposed the pre-2016 names.) The renamed cities are Bakhmut, Bunhe, Chystiakove, Kalmiuske, Khrestivka, Lyman, Myrnohrad, Pokrovsk, Toretsk, and Zalizne, which were previously named Artemivsk, Yunokomunarivsk, Torez, Komsomolske, Kirovske, Krasnyi Lyman, Dymytrov, Krasnoarmiisk, Dzerzhynsk, and Artemove, respectively.

Following the Donbas war, pro-Russian separatist forces controlled all 21 cities located in the Donetsk, Horlivka, and Kalmiuske raions by 2015. After 24 February 2022, during Russia's full-scale invasion of Ukraine, an additional nineteen cities were occupied by Russian troops of which, Lyman and Sviatohirsk were recovered by Ukraine. For their contributions to the country's defense during the invasion, seven cities in the oblast were awarded with the honorary title Hero City of Ukraine: Mariupol and Volnovakha in 2022, and Druzhkivka, Kostiantynivka, Kramatorsk, Pokrovsk, and Sloviansk in 2025.

== List of cities ==
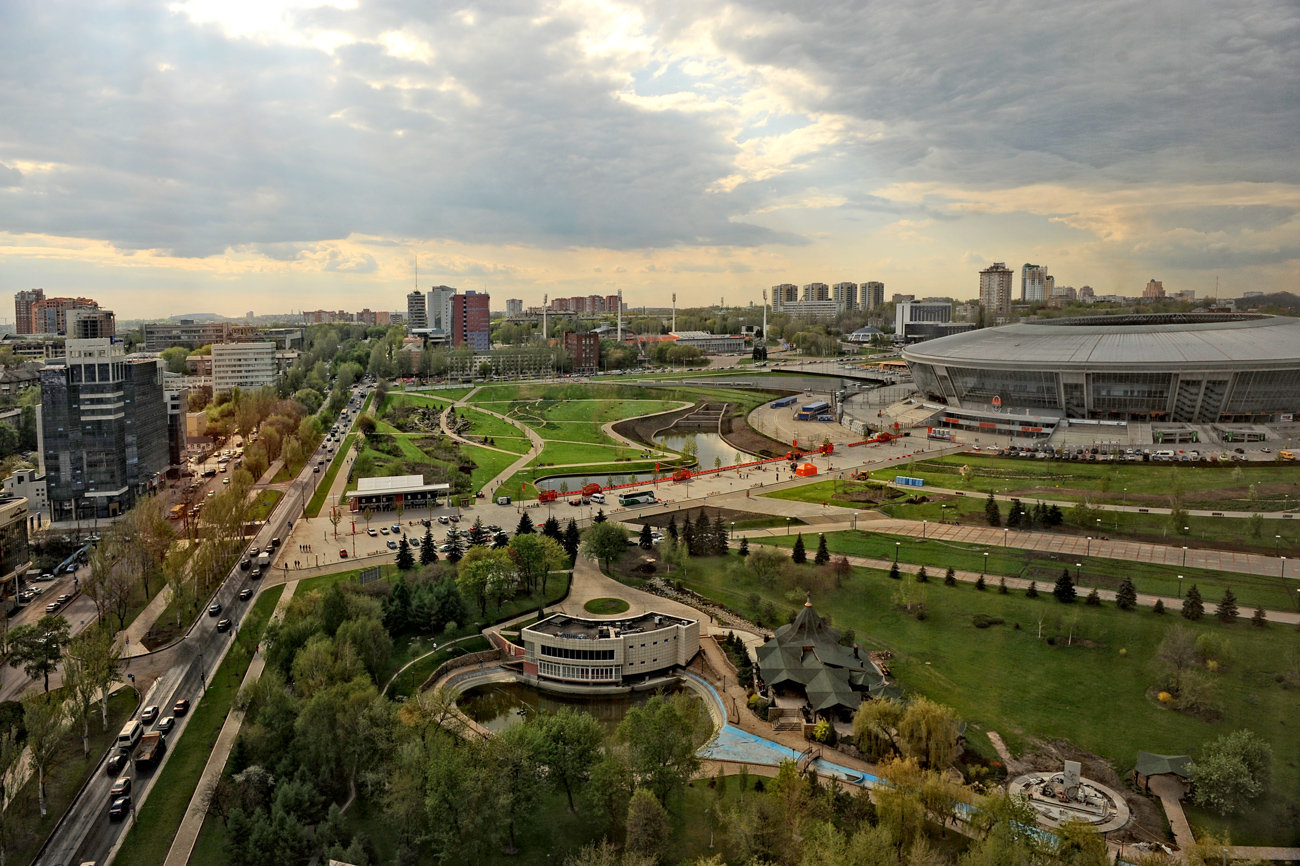
Donetsk, capital and most populous city in Donetsk Oblast

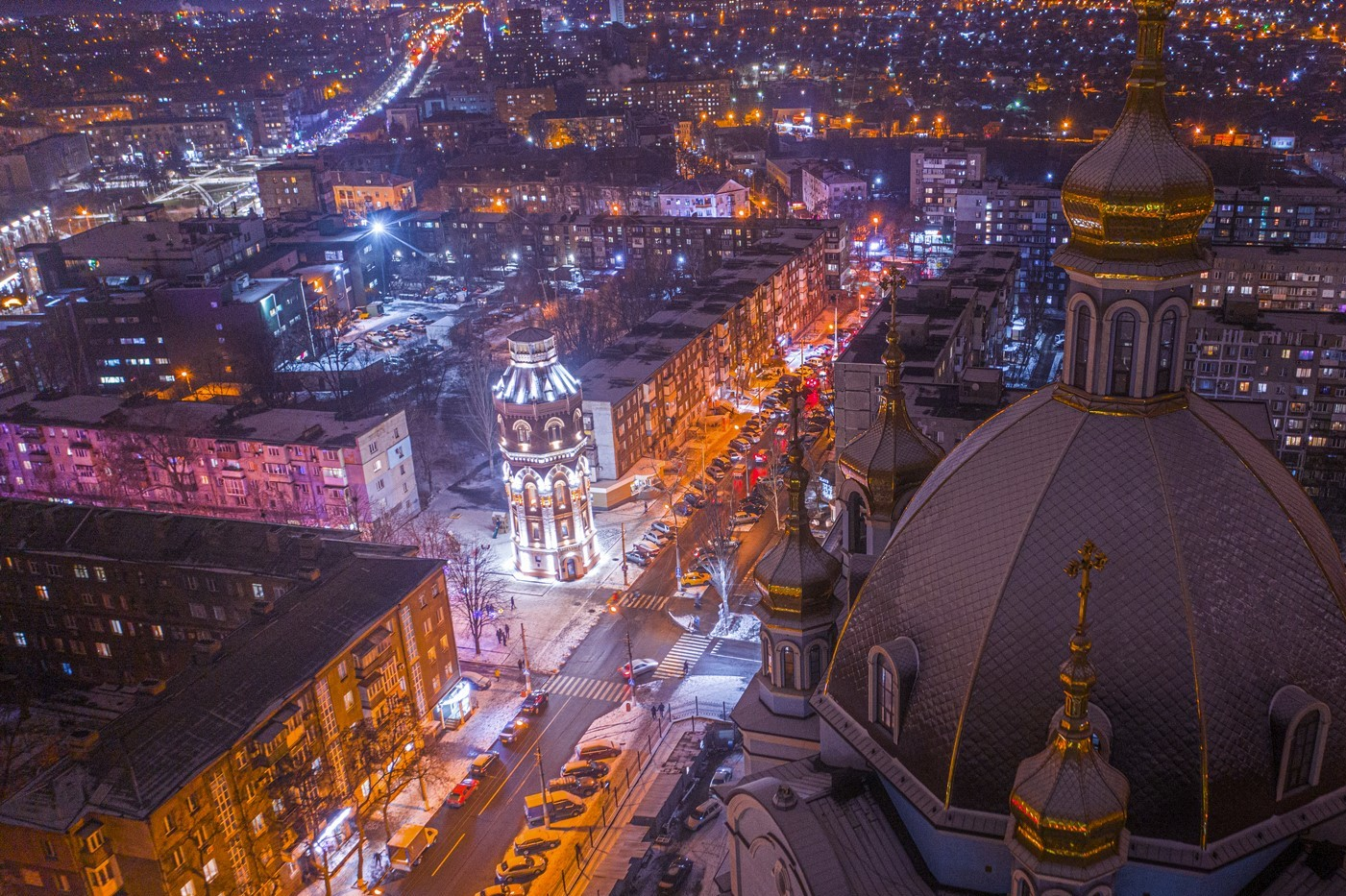
Mariupol, second most populous city and deepest port on the Sea of Azov

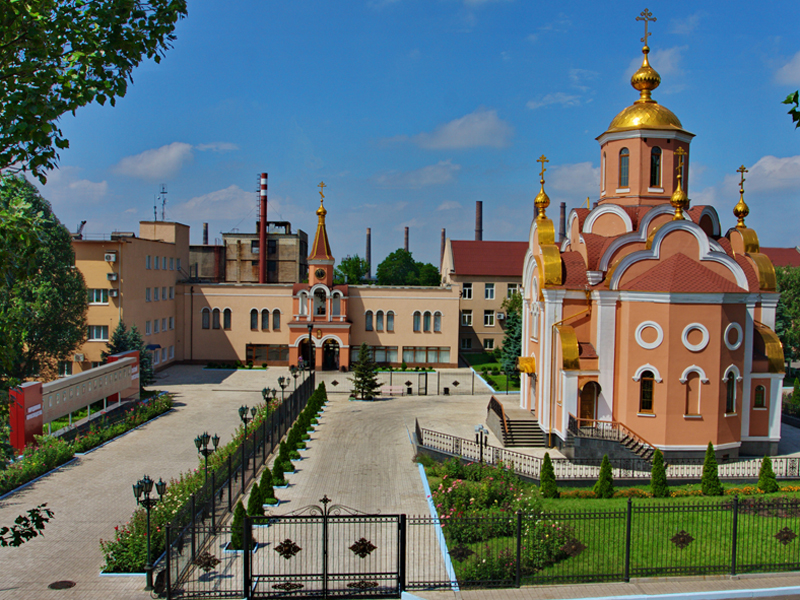
Makiivka, an industrial city in the Donetsk-Makiivka urban agglomeration

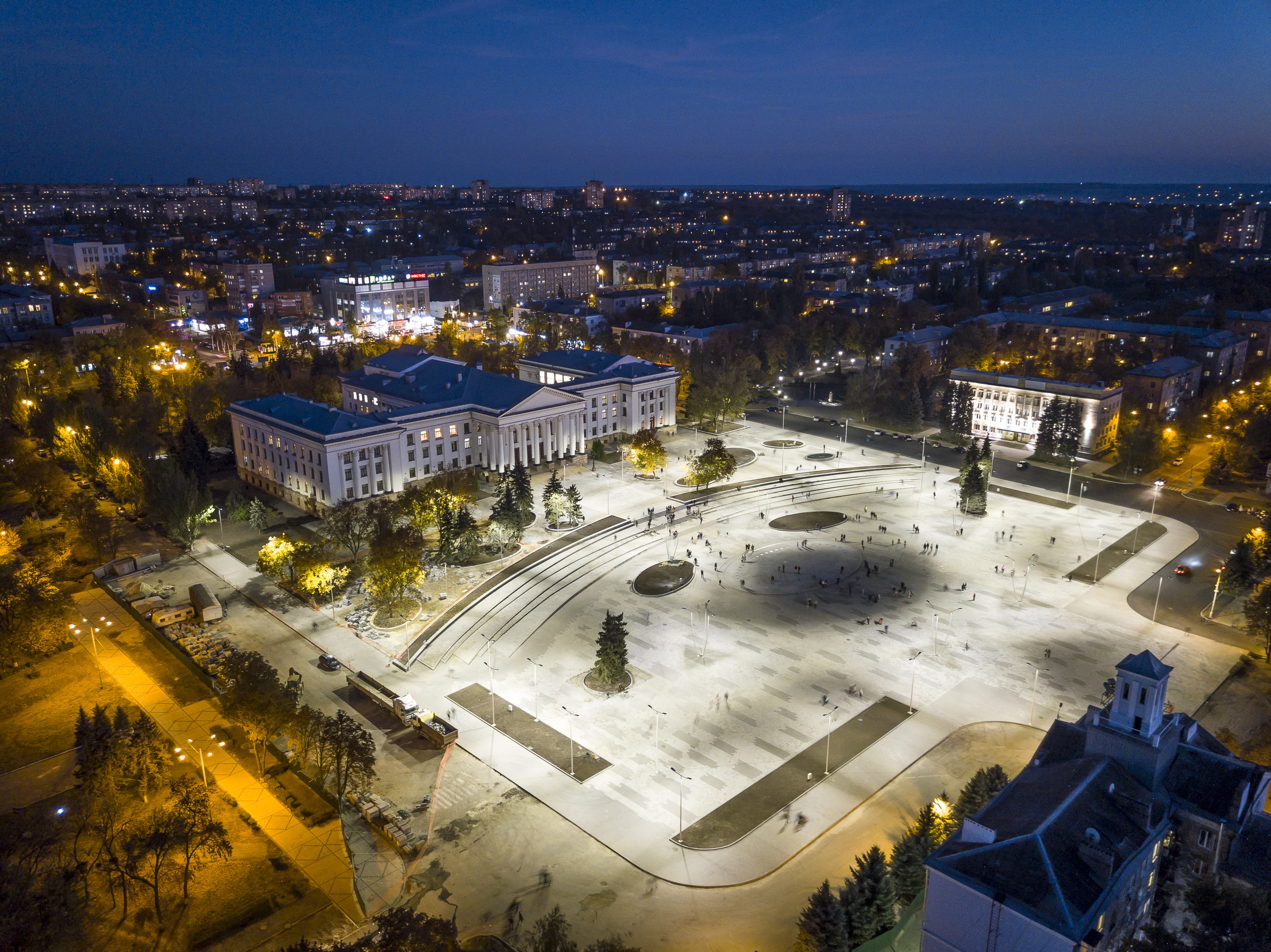
Kramatorsk, the oblast's de facto capital since the start of the Russo-Ukrainian war

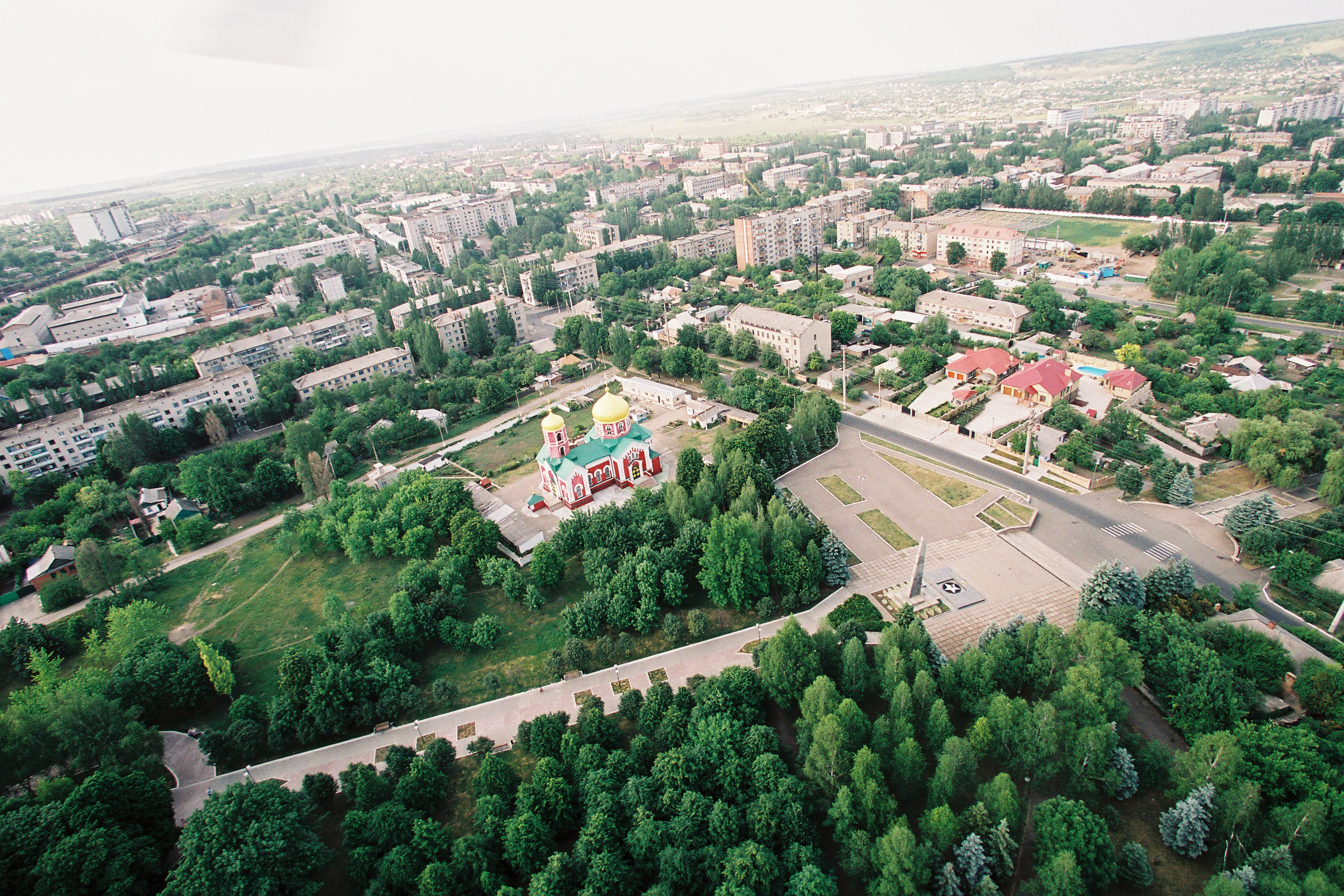
Bakhmut, a major industrial city largely destroyed during the Battle of Bakhmut

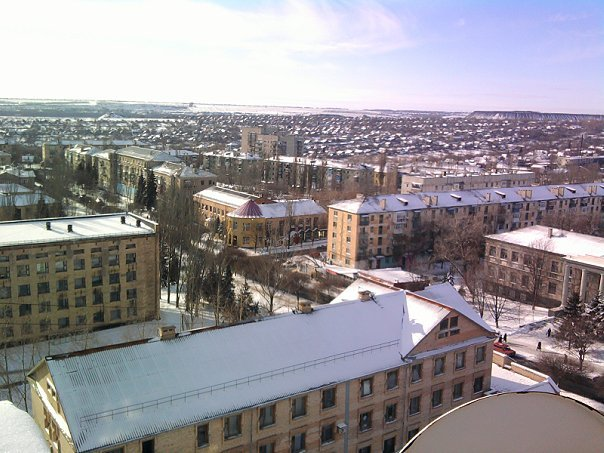
Chystiakove, a coal mining center occupied by pro-Russian separatists since 2014

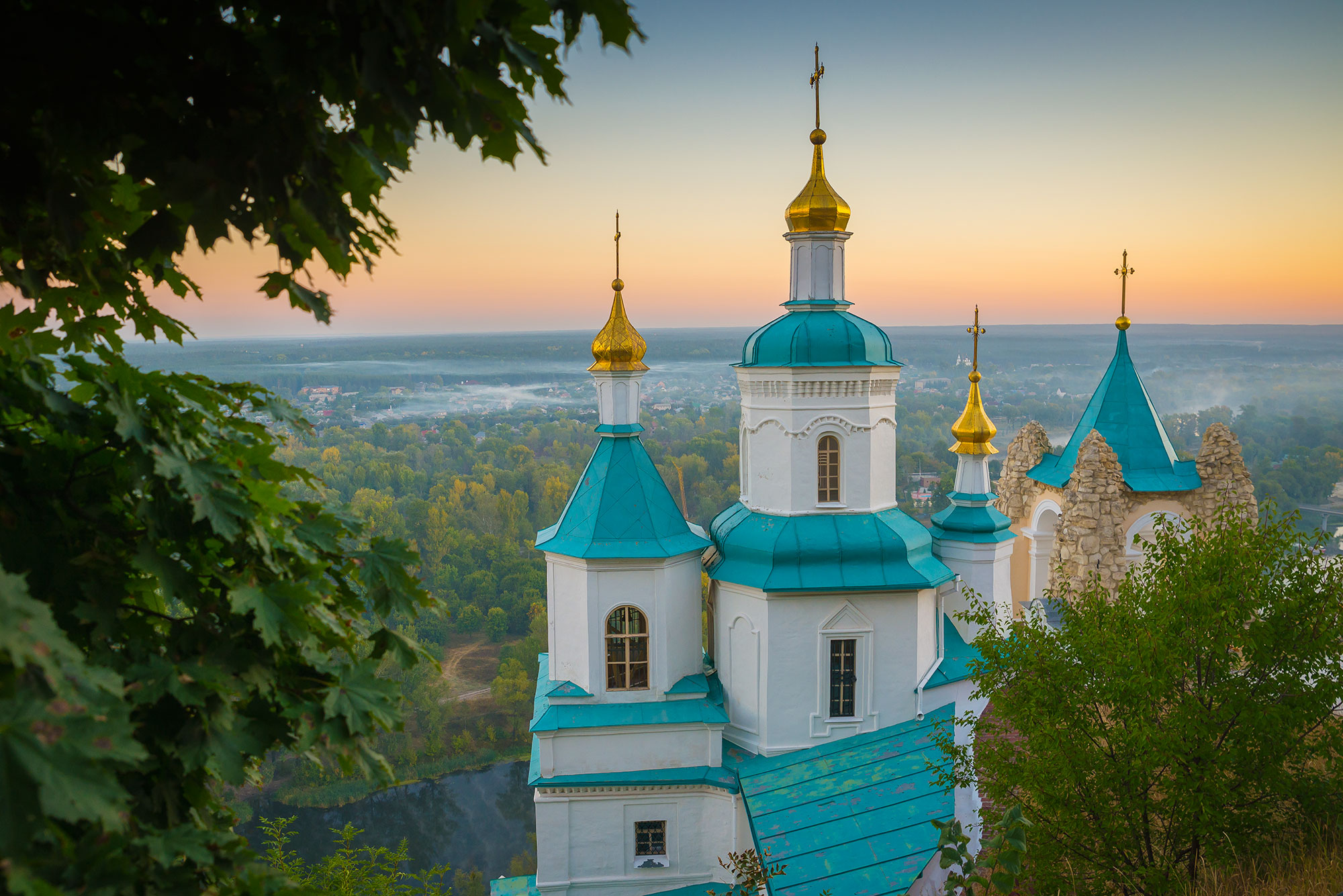
Sviatohirsk, the least populous city in the oblast and site of the 16th-century Sviatohirsk Lavra monastery

Cities in Donetsk Oblast
Name	Name (in Ukrainian) (Note: Links to the Ukrainian Wikipedia articles for each city)	Raion (district)	Population (2022 estimates)	Population (2001 census)	Population change
Amvrosiivka	Амвросіївка	Donetsk	17,998	22,130	−18.67%
Avdiivka	Авдіївка	Pokrovsk	31,392	37,210	−15.64%
Bakhmut	Бахмут	Bakhmut	71,094	82,916	−14.26%
Bilozerske	Білозерське	Pokrovsk	14,634	17,868	−18.10%
Bilytske	Білицьке	Pokrovsk	7,764	10,093	−23.08%
Bunhe	Бунге	Horlivka	13,495	17,813	−24.24%
Chasiv Yar	Часів Яр	Bakhmut	12,250	16,612	−26.26%
Chystiakove	Чистякове	Horlivka	53,462	72,346	−26.10%
Debaltseve	Дебальцеве	Horlivka	24,209	30,246	−19.96%
Dobropillia	Добропілля	Pokrovsk	28,170	35,638	−20.96%
Dokuchaievsk	Докучаєвськ	Kalmiuske	22,835	24,383	−6.35%
Donetsk	Донецьк	Donetsk	901,645	1,016,194	−11.27%
Druzhkivka	Дружківка	Kramatorsk	53,977	64,557	−16.39%
Hirnyk	Гірник	Pokrovsk	10,357	14,207	−27.10%
Horlivka	Горлівка	Horlivka	239,828	292,250	−17.94%
Ilovaisk	Іловайськ	Donetsk	15,395	17,620	−12.63%
Khartsyzk	Харцизьк	Donetsk	56,182	64,175	−12.46%
Khrestivka	Хрестівка	Horlivka	27,370	30,910	−11.45%
Kalmiuske	Кальміуське	Kalmiuske	11,422	12,813	−10.86%
Kostiantynivka	Костянтинівка	Kramatorsk	67,350	95,111	−29.19%
Kramatorsk	Краматорськ	Kramatorsk	147,145	181,025	−18.72%
Krasnohorivka	Красногорівка	Pokrovsk	14,666	16,714	−12.25%
Kurakhove	Курахове	Pokrovsk	18,220	21,479	−15.17%
Lyman	Лиман	Kramatorsk	20,066	28,172	−28.77%
Makiivka	Макіївка	Donetsk	338,968	389,589	−12.99%
Marinka	Мар'їнка	Pokrovsk	9,089	10,722	−15.23%
Mariupol	Маріуполь	Mariupol	425,681	492,176	−13.51%
Mospyne	Моспине	Donetsk	10,471	11,736	−10.78%
Mykolaivka	Миколаївка	Kramatorsk	14,210	16,620 (Note: Classified as an urban-type settlement at the time of the census)	−14.50%
Myrnohrad	Мирноград	Pokrovsk	46,098	54,787	−15.86%
Novoazovsk	Новоазовськ	Kalmiuske	11,051	12,702	−13.00%
Novohrodivka	Новогродівка	Pokrovsk	14,037	17,473	−19.66%
Pokrovsk	Покровськ	Pokrovsk	60,127	69,154	−13.05%
Rodynske	Родинське	Pokrovsk	9,850	11,996	−17.89%
Selydove	Селидове	Pokrovsk	21,521	26,793	−19.68%
Shakhtarsk	Шахтарськ	Horlivka	48,208	59,589	−19.10%
Siversk	Сіверськ	Bakhmut	10,875	14,393	−24.44%
Sloviansk	Слов'янськ	Kramatorsk	105,141	124,829	−15.77%
Snizhne	Сніжне	Horlivka	45,767	58,496	−21.76%
Soledar	Соледар	Bakhmut	10,490	13,151	−20.23%
Sviatohirsk	Святогірськ	Kramatorsk	4,226	5,136	−17.72%
Svitlodarsk	Світлодарськ	Bakhmut	11,127	13,184	−15.60%
Toretsk	Торецьк	Bakhmut	30,914	43,371	−28.72%
Ukrainsk	Українськ	Pokrovsk	10,655	13,236	−19.50%
Volnovakha	Волноваха	Volnovakha	21,166	24,647	−14.12%
Vuhledar	Вугледар	Volnovakha	14,144	17,440	−18.90%
Vuhlehirsk	Вуглегірськ	Horlivka	7,294	10,309	−29.25%
Yasynuvata	Ясинувата	Donetsk	34,144	37,552	−9.08%
Yenakiieve	Єнакієве	Horlivka	76,673	103,997	−26.27%
Zalizne	Залізне	Bakhmut	4,928	6,725	−26.72%
Zhdanivka	Жданівка	Horlivka	11,867	13,688	−13.30%
Zuhres	Зугрес	Donetsk	17,871	19,859	−10.01%

== See also ==
- List of cities in Ukraine
