= Aleksandr Bulashenko =

Russian footballer (born 1961)

Personal information
- Full name: Aleksandr Georgiyevich Bulashenko
- Date of birth: 18 November 1961 (age 64)
- Place of birth: Khartsyzk, Ukrainian SSR
- Height: 1.84 m (6 ft 1/2 in)
- Positions: Forward; midfielder

Youth career
- SDYuShOR-3 Azov
- ROShISP-10 Rostov-on-Don

Senior career*
Years	Team	Apps	(Gls)
1979–1981	FC Rostselmash Rostov-on-Don	67	(3)
1982–1984	FC SKA Rostov-on-Don	32	(8)
1985	FC Krylia Sovetov Kuybyshev	25	(3)
1986–1987	FC Nistru Chişinău	41	(5)
1987–1988	FC Torpedo Taganrog	59	(19)
1989–1992	FC Rostselmash Rostov-on-Don	126	(3)
1992	→ FC Rostselmash-2 Rostov-on-Don (loan)	2	(1)
1992–1993	Bajai LSE	12	(2)
1993	FC Rostselmash Rostov-on-Don	0	(0)
1993	→ FC Rostselmash-2 Rostov-on-Don (loan)	10	(0)
1995	FC Avangard Rostov-on-Don		
1997	FC Inter Rostov-on-Don		
- * Club domestic league appearances and goals

Aleksandr Georgiyevich Bulashenko (Russian: Александр Георгиевич Булашенко; born 18 November 1961 in Khartsyzk) is a former Russian football player.

Upon retirement as a player, he worked as a referee in the Russian Second League from 1997 to 1999.
