= Kontarne =

Urban locality in Donetsk Oblast, Ukraine

Kontarne Контарне
- Rural settlement
- Location of Kontarne within Donetsk Oblast#Location of Kontarne within Ukraine Kontarne (Ukraine)
- Coordinates: 48°05′11″N 38°30′39″E
- Country: Ukraine
- Oblast: Donetsk Oblast
- Raion: Donetsk Raion
- Elevation: 222 m (728 ft)

Population (2022)
  - Total: 1,421
- Time zone: UTC+2 (EET)
  - Summer (DST): UTC+3 (EEST)
- Postal code: 86241
- Area code: +380 6255

Kontarne (Ukrainian: Контарне) is a rural settlement in Shakhtarsk urban hromada, Horlivka Raion, Donetsk Oblast, eastern Ukraine. Population: 1,421 (2022 estimate).

== Demographics ==
Native language as of the Ukrainian Census of 2001:

- Ukrainian 9.82%
- Russian 89.42%
- Belarusian 0.10%
- Hungarian 0.05%
