= Lyman Raion =

Lyman Raion may refer to:

- Lyman Raion, Donetsk Oblast, Ukraine
- Lyman Raion, Odesa Oblast, Ukraine
