= Zalisne, Donetsk Oblast =

Urban locality in Donetsk Oblast, Ukraine

Zalisne Залісне
- Rural settlement
- Location of Zalisne Zalisne (Ukraine)
- Coordinates: 48°01′59″N 38°48′52″E
- Country: Ukraine
- Oblast: Donetsk Oblast
- Raion: Horlivka Raion
- Elevation: 270 m (890 ft)

Population (2022)
  - Total: 2,396
- Time zone: UTC+2
  - Summer (DST): UTC+3
- Postal code: 86590
- Area code: +380 6256

Zalisne (Ukrainian: Залісне) is a rural settlement in Snizhne urban hromada, Horlivka Raion, Donetsk Oblast, eastern Ukraine. Population: 2,396 (2022 estimate).

== Demographics ==
Native language as of the Ukrainian Census of 2001:

- Ukrainian 18.77%
- Russian 75.2%
- Belarusian 0.33%
- Armenian 0.07%
- Moldovan (Romanian) 0.04%
