= Nykyforove =

Urban locality in Donetsk Oblast, Ukraine

Nykyforove Никифорове
- Rural settlement
- Location of Nykyforove Nykyforove (Ukraine)
- Coordinates: 48°00′27″N 38°51′05″E
- Country: Ukraine
- Oblast: Donetsk
- Raion: Horlivka Raion
- Hromada: Snizhne urban hromada
- Elevation: 224 m (735 ft)

Population (2022)
  - Total: 354
- Time zone: UTC+2
  - Summer (DST): UTC+3
- Postal code: 86591
- Area code: +380 6256

Nykyforove (Ukrainian: Никифорове) is a rural settlement in Snizhne urban hromada, Horlivka Raion, Donetsk Oblast, eastern Ukraine. Population: 354 (2022 estimate).

== History ==
During World War II, Nykyforove was occupied by Nazi Germany between October 31, 1941 and September 1, 1943. Nykyforove received urban-type settlement status in 1957.

== Demographics ==
According to the 2001 Ukrainian census, the village had a population of 408 residents.

The majority of the population in Nykyforove speaks Russian as their first language, with 87.99% of residents stating it as their mother tongue. A smaller proportion of the population, 12.01%, identified Ukrainian as their mother tongue.

| Native Language | Percentage of Population |
|---|---|
| Ukrainian | 12.01% |
| Russian | 87.99% |
