= Lymanchuk =

Urban locality in Donetsk Oblast, Ukraine

Lymanchuk Лиманчук
- Rural settlement
- Location of Lymanchuk Lymanchuk (Ukraine)
- Coordinates: 48°00′51″N 38°49′27″E
- Country: Ukraine
- Oblast: Donetsk
- Raion: Horlivka Raion
- Hromada: Snizhne urban hromada
- Elevation: 273 m (896 ft)

Population (2022)
  - Total: 888
- Time zone: UTC+2
  - Summer (DST): UTC+3
- Postal code: 86592
- Area code: +380 6256

Lymanchuk (Ukrainian: Лиманчук) is a rural settlement in Snizhne urban hromada, Horlivka Raion, Donetsk Oblast, eastern Ukraine. Population: 888 (2022 estimate).

== Demographics ==
Native language as of the Ukrainian Census of 2001:

- Ukrainian 15.67%
- Russian 84.33%
