= Maiak, Donetsk Raion, Donetsk Oblast =

Urban locality in Donetsk Oblast, Ukraine

Maiak Маяк
- Rural settlement
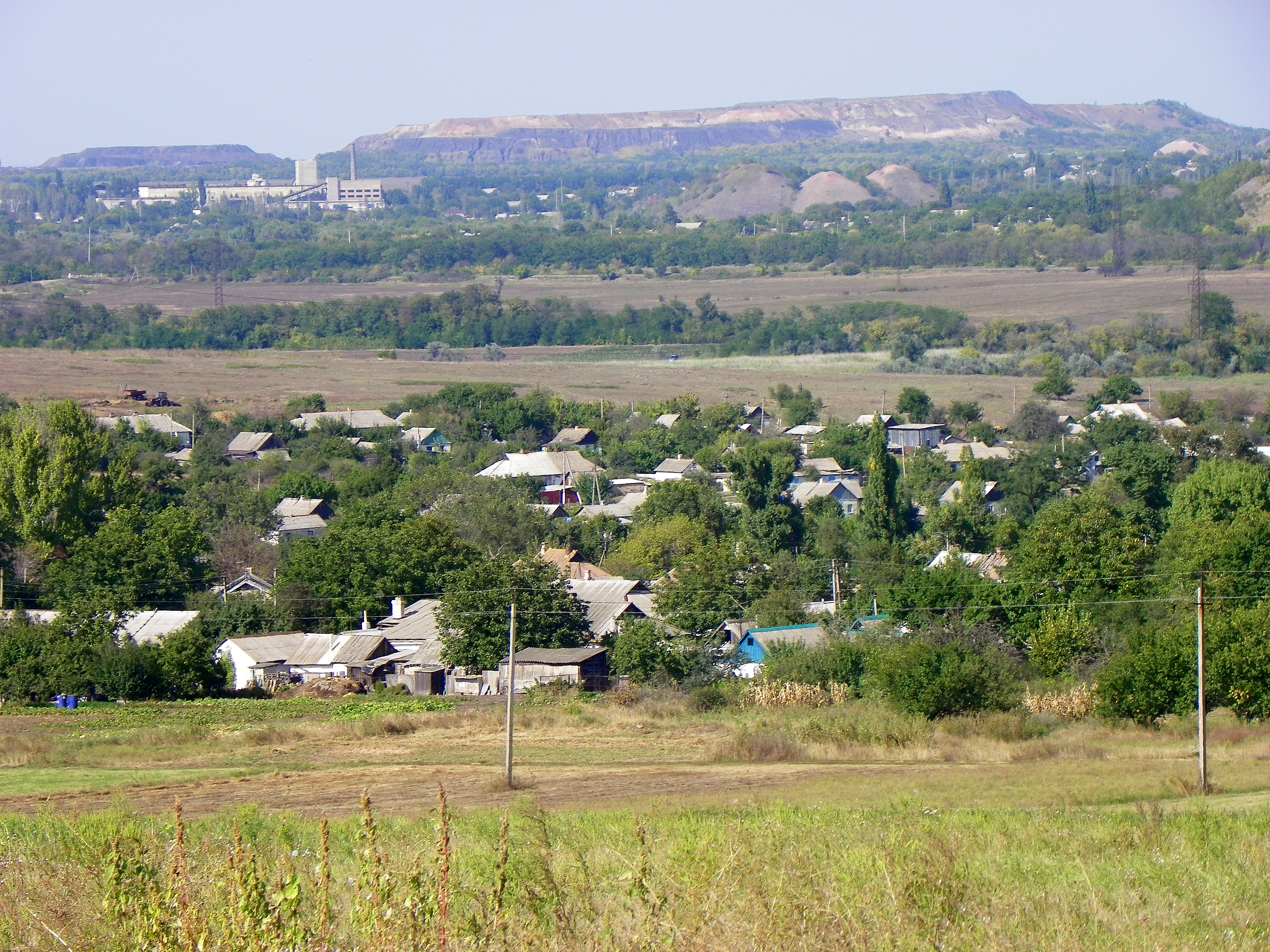

- Location of Maiak within Donetsk Oblast#Location of Maiak within Ukraine Maiak (Ukraine)
- Coordinates: 47°57′55″N 38°01′52″E
- Country: Ukraine
- Oblast: Donetsk Oblast
- Raion: Donetsk Raion
- Hromada: Makiivka urban hromada

Population (2022)
  - Total: 1,174
- Time zone: UTC+2 (EET)
  - Summer (DST): UTC+3 (EEST)
- Postal code: 86195
- Area code: +380 6232

Maiak (Ukrainian: Маяк) is a rural settlement in Makiivka urban hromada, Donetsk Raion in Donetsk Oblast of Ukraine. Population: 1,174 (2022 estimate).

== Demographics ==
Native language as of the Ukrainian Census of 2001:

- Ukrainian 14.74%
- Russian 84.93%
- Belarusian 0.33%
