= Kamianka, Horlivka Raion, Donetsk Oblast =

Kamianka Кам'янка
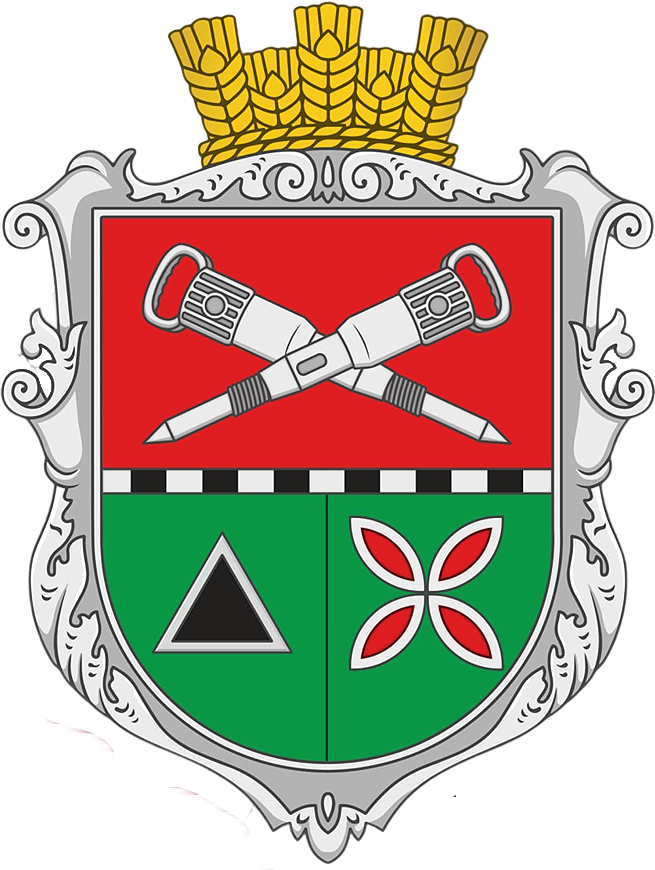
- Coat of arms

- Location of Kamianka within Ukraine
- Coordinates: 48.245556°N 38.4875°E
- Country: Ukraine
- Oblast: Donetsk Oblast
- Raion: Horlivka Raion
- Elevation: 299 m (981 ft)

Population (2001 census)
  - Total: 742
- Time zone: UTC+2 (EET)
  - Summer (DST): UTC+3 (EEST)
- Postal code: 86492
- Area code: +380 6252

Kamianka (Ukrainian: Кам'янка; Russian: Каменка) is a rural settlement in Horlivka Raion (district) in Donetsk Oblast of eastern Ukraine, at 75.6 km NNE from the centre of Donetsk city.

The War in Donbass, that started in mid-April 2014, has brought along both civilian and military casualties. A minivan, filled with explosives, was blown up at the Ukrainian check-point near the settlement on 21 July 2014, killing five Ukrainian servicemen.

== Demographics ==
Native language as of the Ukrainian Census of 2001:

- Ukrainian — 16.71%
- Russian 83.29%
