= Lisne, Donetsk Raion, Donetsk Oblast =

Urban locality in Donetsk Oblast, Ukraine

Lisne Лісне
- Rural settlement
- Location of Lisne within Donetsk Oblast#Location of Lisne within Ukraine Lisne (Ukraine)
- Coordinates: 48°05′50″N 38°08′06″E
- Country: Ukraine
- Oblast: Donetsk Oblast
- Raion: Donetsk Raion
- Hromada: Makiivka urban hromada
- Elevation: 174 m (571 ft)

Population (2022)
  - Total: 132
- Time zone: UTC+2 (EET)
  - Summer (DST): UTC+3 (EEST)
- Postal code: 86185
- Area code: +380 6232

Lisne (Ukrainian: Лісне) is a rural settlement in Makiivka urban hromada, Donetsk Raion, Donetsk Oblast, Ukraine. Population: 132 (2022 estimate).

== Demographics ==
Native language as of the Ukrainian Census of 2001:

- Ukrainian 5.81%
- Russian 94.19%
