= Brazhyne =

Urban locality in Donetsk Oblast, Ukraine

Brazhyne Бражине
- Rural settlement
- Location of Brazhyne Brazhyne (Ukraine)
- Coordinates: 47°59′55″N 38°49′38″E
- Country: Ukraine
- Oblast: Donetsk Oblast
- Raion: Horlivka Raion
- Hromada: Snizhne urban hromada
- Elevation: 241 m (791 ft)

Population (2022)
  - Total: 312
- Time zone: UTC+2
  - Summer (DST): UTC+3
- Postal code: 86594
- Area code: +380 6256

Brazhyne (Ukrainian: Бражине) is a rural settlement in Snizhne urban hromada, Horlivka Raion, Donetsk Oblast, eastern Ukraine. Population: 312 (2022 estimate).

== Demographics ==
Native language as of the Ukrainian Census of 2001:

- Ukrainian 18.72%
- Russian 81.01%
