= Khartsyzk =

City in Donetsk Oblast, Ukraine

Khartsyzk Харцизьк
- City
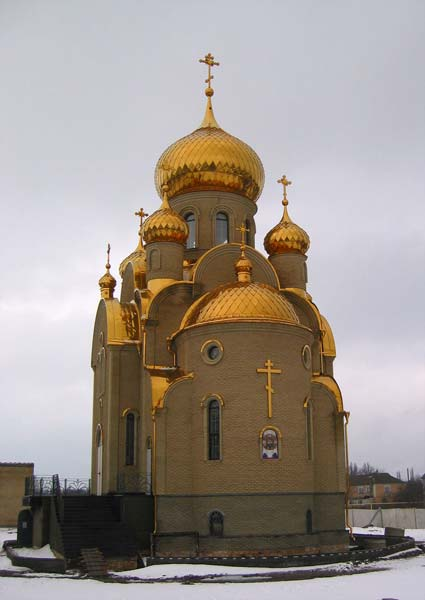
- Church of the Theotokos of Iveron

- Flag Coat of arms
- Interactive map of Khartsyzk
- Location within Donetsk Oblast Location within Ukraine
- Coordinates: 48°02′34″N 38°08′33″E
- Country: Ukraine
- Oblast: Donetsk Oblast
- Raion: Donetsk Raion
- Hromada: Khartsyzk urban hromada
- Founded: 1869
- City status: 1938

Government
  - Occupation head: Viktoria Zhukova

Area
  - Total: 19.3 km^{2} (7.5 sq mi)
- Elevation: 216 m (709 ft)

Population (2022)
  - Total: 56,182

Khartsyzk (Ukrainian: Харцизьк, pronounced [xɐrˈtsɪzʲk]; Russian: Харцызск, romanized: Khartsyzsk, pronounced [xɐrˈtsɨsːk]) is a city in Donetsk Raion, Donetsk Oblast, in eastern Ukraine. The city has a population of 56,182 (2022 estimate).

== History ==
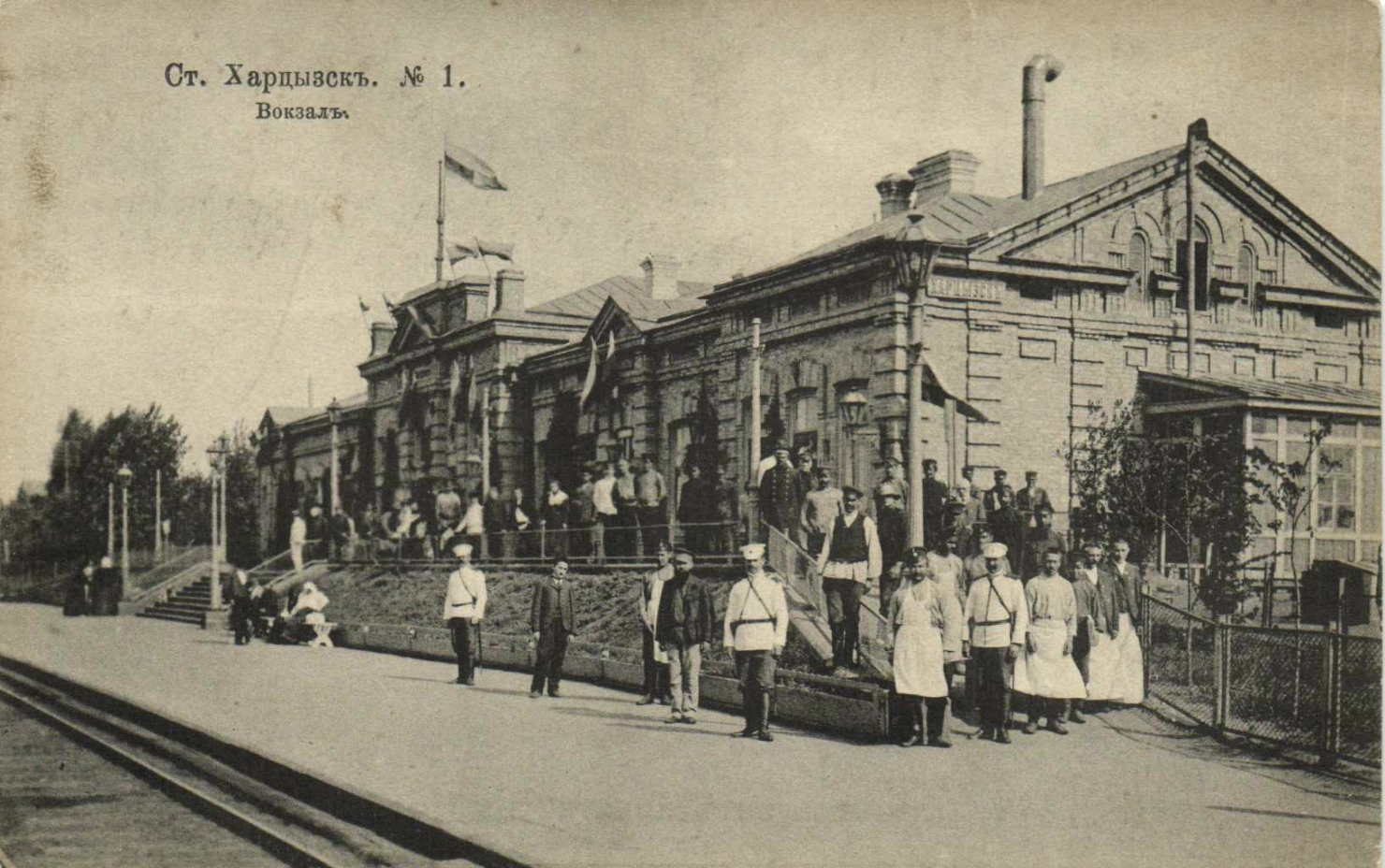
Railway station before 1917

It was founded in 1869 as a settlement at the station put into operation on the Kursk-Kharkiv-Azov railway. The Khartsyzsk settlement, which belonged to Major General Ivan Ilovaysky, was founded on the site of the modern city in 1786.

Its name comes from the word "khartsyzy" ("robbers, plunderers"), which was the name used by Turks and Tatars in the sixteenth century for fugitive peasants and Zaporizhzhia Cossacks who settled near the southern borders of the Moscow state. The places of their settlements were called "Khartsyzsk". In 1883, a railway line was laid to the Makiivka mine, and in 1884—to the Krynychna and Yasysivka stations (modern Makiivka-Pasazhyrska), and in 1898—to the Makiivka metallurgical plant "Union".

During the Ukrainian War of Independence, from 1917 to 1920, it passed between various factions. Afterwards, it was administratively part of the Donets Governorate of Ukraine.

Starting Mid-April 2014 pro-Russian separatists took control of several towns in Donetsk Oblast.

Unknown armed men took control of the Khartsyzk city hall on 13 April 2014, and declared it part of the Donetsk People's Republic.

By the beginning of Russia's large-scale invasion, Khartsyzsk was under Russian occupation. Preparing for the resumption of the active phase of hostilities, in mid-February, Russian troops staged provocations under the pretext of announcing a mobilization in the city and the occupied part of Donbas in general to join the ranks of armed groups operating in the region. Serhiy Bratchuk, a spokesperson for the Odesa Regional Military Administration, reported the destruction of a Russian military depot in the city of Khartsyzsk on 9 July 2022.

== Demographics ==
Ethnicities in the city as of the 2001 Ukrainian Census:

Ethnic groups in Khartsyzk
	percent
Ukrainians	52.4%
Russians	44.1%
Belarusians	0.9%
Azerbaijanis	0.6%
Greeks	0.3%
Armenians	0.3%
Georgians	0.2%
others	1.8%

== Notable people ==
- Serhiy Larin (born 1962), Ukrainian politician
