= Vesela Dolyna, Horlivka Raion, Donetsk Oblast =

Village in Donetsk Oblast, Ukraine

Vesela Dolyna Весела Долина
- Location of Vesela Dolyna Vesela Dolyna (Ukraine)
- Coordinates: 48°12′42″N 38°25′51″E
- Country: Ukraine
- Oblast: Donetsk Oblast
- Raion: Horlivka Raion

Population (2001)
  - Total: 5
- Postal code: 86431
- Area code: +380 6252
- Climate: Cfa

Vesela Dolyna (Ukrainian: Весела Долина) is a village in Horlivka Raion, Donetsk Oblast (province) of Ukraine. It was previously located in Bakhmut Raion.

== Demographics ==
Native language as of the Ukrainian Census of 2001:

- Ukrainian 20%
- Russian 20%
- Belarusian 60%
