= Shakhtne =

Urban locality in Donetsk Oblast, Ukraine

Shakhtne Шахтне
- Rural settlement
- Location of Shakhtne within Donetsk Oblast#Location of Shakhtne within Ukraine Shakhtne (Ukraine)
- Coordinates: 47°58′55″N 38°16′51″E
- Country: Ukraine
- Oblast: Donetsk Oblast
- Raion: Donetsk Raion
- Hromada: Khartsyzk urban hromada
- Elevation: 116 m (381 ft)

Population (2022)
  - Total: 777
- Time zone: UTC+2 (EET)
  - Summer (DST): UTC+3 (EEST)
- Postal code: 86791
- Area code: +380 6257

Shakhtne (Ukrainian: Шахтне) is a rural settlement in Khartsyzk urban hromada, Donetsk Raion, Donetsk Oblast, eastern Ukraine. Population: 777 (2022 estimate).

== Demographics ==
Native language as of the Ukrainian Census of 2001:

- Ukrainian 26.63%
- Russian 73.08%
- Belarusian and Moldovan (Romanian) 0.1%
