= Serdyte =

Urban locality in Donetsk Oblast, Ukraine

Serdyte Сердите
- Rural settlement
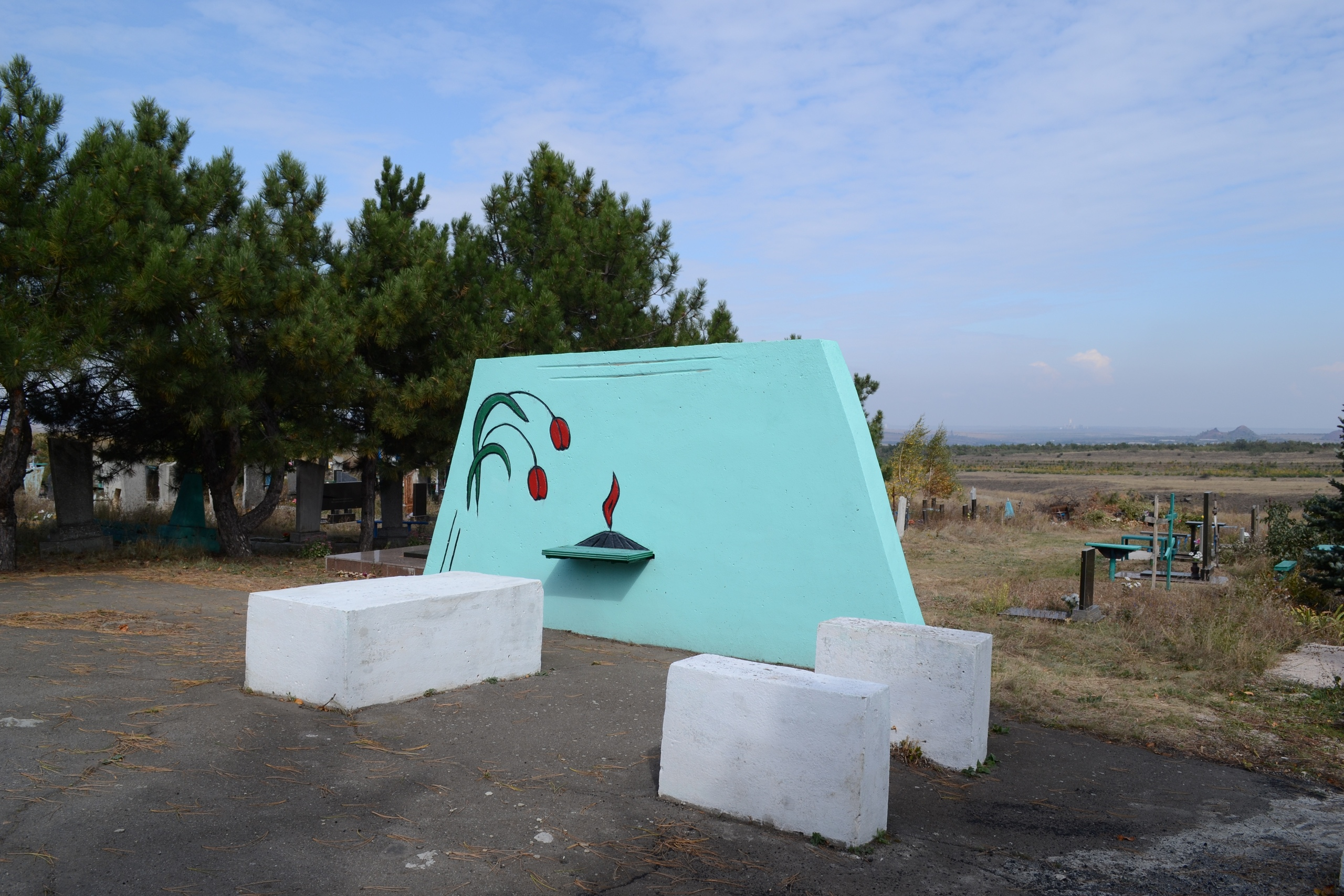

- Location of Serdyte within Donetsk Oblast#Location of Serdyte within Ukraine Serdyte (Ukraine)
- Coordinates: 48°02′30″N 38°23′18″E
- Country: Ukraine
- Oblast: Donetsk Oblast
- Raion: Horlivka Raion
- Elevation: 234 m (768 ft)

Population (2022)
  - Total: 1,928
- Time zone: UTC+2 (EET)
  - Summer (DST): UTC+3 (EEST)
- Postal code: 86250
- Area code: +380 6255

Serdyte (Ukrainian: Сердите) is a rural settlement in Shakhtarsk urban hromada, Horlivka Raion, Donetsk Oblast, eastern Ukraine. Population: 1,928 (2022 estimate).

== Demographics ==
Native language as of the Ukrainian Census of 2001:

- Ukrainian 12.41%
- Russian 86.91%
- Belarusian 0.24%
- Moldovan (Romanian) 0.1%
