= Hirnytske, Donetsk Oblast =

Urban locality in Donetsk Oblast, Ukraine

Hirnytske Гірницьке
- Rural settlement
- Location of Hirnytske Hirnytske (Ukraine)
- Coordinates: 48°00′20″N 38°49′57″E
- Country: Ukraine
- Oblast: Donetsk Oblast
- Raion: Horlivka Raion
- Elevation: 271 m (889 ft)

Population (2022)
  - Total: 1,158
- Time zone: UTC+2
  - Summer (DST): UTC+3
- Postal code: 86591
- Area code: +380 6256

Hirnytske (Ukrainian: Гірницьке) is a rural settlement in Snizhne urban hromada, Donetsk Oblast, Ukraine. Population: 1,158 (2022 estimate).

== Demographics ==
Native language as of the Ukrainian Census of 2001:

- Ukrainian 7.36%
- Russian 92.64%
