= Mezhove, Donetsk Raion, Donetsk Oblast =

Urban locality in Donetsk Oblast, Ukraine

Mezhove Межове
- Rural settlement
- Interactive map of Mezhove
- Location of Mezhove within Donetsk Oblast Mezhove (Ukraine)
- Coordinates: 47°58′00″N 38°04′15″E
- Country: Ukraine
- Oblast: Donetsk Oblast
- Raion: Donetsk Raion
- Hromada: Makiivka urban hromada
- Elevation: 154 m (505 ft)

Population (2022)
  - Total: 1,193
- Time zone: UTC+2 (EET)
  - Summer (DST): UTC+3 (EEST)
- Postal code: 86196
- Area code: +380 6232

Mezhove (Ukrainian: Межове) is a rural settlement in Makiivka urban hromada, Donetsk Raion, Donetsk Oblast, Ukraine. Population: 1,193 (2022 estimate).

== Demographics ==
Native language as of the Ukrainian Census of 2001:

- Ukrainian 15.67%
- Russian 83.87%
- Belarusian 0.15%
- Armenian 0.08%
