= Kolosnykove =

Urban locality in Donetsk Oblast, Ukraine

Kolosnykove Колосникове
- Rural settlement
- Location of Kolosnykove within Donetsk Oblast#Location of Kolosnykove within Ukraine Kolosnykove (Ukraine)
- Coordinates: 48°02′36″N 38°03′52″E
- Country: Ukraine
- Oblast: Donetsk Oblast
- Raion: Donetsk Raion
- Hromada: Makiivka urban hromada
- Elevation: 242 m (794 ft)

Population (2022)
  - Total: 597
- Time zone: UTC+2 (EET)
  - Summer (DST): UTC+3 (EEST)
- Postal code: 86192
- Area code: +380 6232

Kolosnykove (Ukrainian: Колосникове) is a rural settlement in Makiivka urban hromada, Donetsk Raion in Donetsk Oblast of Ukraine. Population: 597 (2022 estimate).

== Demographics ==
Native language as of the Ukrainian Census of 2001:

- Ukrainian 18.62%
- Russian 80.23%
- Belarusian 0.16%
