= Pobieda, Horlivka Raion, Donetsk Oblast =

Urban locality in Donetsk Oblast, Ukraine

Pobieda Побєда
- Rural settlement
- Location of Pobieda Pobieda (Ukraine)
- Coordinates: 47°58′46″N 38°48′24″E
- Country: Ukraine
- Oblast: Donetsk Oblast
- Raion: Horlivka Raion
- Elevation: 214 m (702 ft)

Population (2022)
  - Total: 542
- Time zone: UTC+2
  - Summer (DST): UTC+3
- Postal code: 86595
- Area code: +380 6256

Pobieda (Ukrainian: Побєда) is a rural settlement in Snizhne urban hromada, Horlivka Raion, Donetsk Oblast, eastern Ukraine. Population: 542 (2022 estimate).

== Demographics ==
Native language as of the Ukrainian Census of 2001:

- Ukrainian 17.35%
- Russian 82.65%
