= Velyke Orikhove =

Urban locality in Donetsk Oblast, Ukraine

Velyke Orikhove Велике Оріхове
- Rural settlement
- Location of Velyke Orikhove within Donetsk Oblast#Location of Velyke Orikhove within Ukraine Velyke Orikhove (Ukraine)
- Coordinates: 48°05′12″N 38°07′57″E
- Country: Ukraine
- Oblast: Donetsk Oblast
- Raion: Donetsk Raion
- Hromada: Makiivka urban hromada
- Elevation: 210 m (690 ft)

Population (2022)
  - Total: 591
- Time zone: UTC+2 (EET)
  - Summer (DST): UTC+3 (EEST)
- Postal code: 86185
- Area code: +380 6232

Velyke Orikhove (Ukrainian: Велике Оріхове) is a rural settlement in Makiivka urban hromada, Donetsk Raion in Donetsk Oblast of Ukraine. 591 (2022 estimate).

== Demographics ==
Native language as of the Ukrainian Census of 2001:

- Ukrainian 23.63%
- Russian 74.67%
- Belarusian 0.52%
- Romanian 0.13%
