= Vuhliar =

Urban locality in Donetsk Oblast, Ukraine

Vuhliar Вугляр
- Rural settlement
- Location of Vuhliar within Donetsk Oblast#Location of Vuhliar within Ukraine Vuhliar (Ukraine)
- Coordinates: 48°01′00″N 38°03′36″E
- Country: Ukraine
- Oblast: Donetsk Oblast
- Raion: Donetsk Raion
- Hromada: Makiivka urban hromada
- Elevation: 206 m (676 ft)

Population (2022)
  - Total: 1,087
- Time zone: UTC+2 (EET)
  - Summer (DST): UTC+3 (EEST)
- Postal code: 86194
- Area code: +380 6232

Vuhliar (Ukrainian: Вугляр) is a rural settlement in Makiivka urban hromada, Donetsk Raion in Donetsk Oblast of Ukraine. Population: 1,087 (2022 estimate).

== Demographics ==
Native language as of the Ukrainian Census of 2001:

- Ukrainian 12.93%
- Russian 86.99%
- Belarusian 0.08%
