= Troitsko-Khartsyzk =

Urban locality in Donetsk Oblast, Ukraine

Troitsko-Khartsyzk Троїцько-Харцизьк
- Rural settlement
- Location of Troitsko-Khartsyzk within Donetsk Oblast Location of Troitsko-Khartsyzk within Ukraine
- Coordinates: 47°58′05″N 38°15′59″E
- Country: Ukraine
- Oblast: Donetsk Oblast
- Raion: Donetsk Raion
- Hromada: Khartsyzk urban hromada
- Elevation: 109 m (358 ft)

Population (2022)
  - Total: 907
- Time zone: UTC+2 (EET)
  - Summer (DST): UTC+3 (EEST)
- Postal code: 86790
- Area code: +380 6257

Troitsko-Khartsyzk (Ukrainian: Троїцько-Харцизьк) is a rural settlement in Khartsyzk urban hromada, Donetsk Raion, Donetsk Oblast, Ukraine. Population: 907 (2022 estimate).

== Demographics ==
Native language as of the Ukrainian Census of 2001:

- Ukrainian: 34.46%
- Russian: 65.54%
