= Hirne, Donetsk Raion =

Urban locality in Donetsk Oblast, Ukraine

Hirne Гірне
- Rural settlement
- Location of Hirne within Donetsk Oblast#Location of Hirne within Ukraine Hirne (Ukraine)
- Coordinates: 48°03′30″N 38°11′57″E
- Country: Ukraine
- Oblast: Donetsk Oblast
- Raion: Donetsk Raion
- Hromada: Khartsyzk urban hromada
- Founded: 1914
- Elevation: 218 m (715 ft)

Population (2022)
  - Total: 3,277
- Time zone: UTC+2 (EET)
  - Summer (DST): UTC+3 (EEST)
- Postal code: 86782
- Area code: +380 6257

Hirne (Ukrainian: Гірне) is a rural settlement in Khartsyzk urban hromada, Donetsk Raion, Donetsk Oblast in Ukraine. Population update: 3,277 (2022 estimate).

== Demographics ==
Native language as of the Ukrainian Census of 2001:

- Ukrainian 8.39%
- Russian 90.73%
- Romani 0.39%
- Belarusian 0.08%
- Armenian 0.05%
- Greek 0.03%
