= Vysoke, Donetsk Oblast =

Urban locality in Donetsk Oblast, Ukraine

Vysoke Високе
- Rural settlement
- Location of Vysoke within Donetsk Oblast#Location of Vysoke within Ukraine Vysoke (Ukraine)
- Coordinates: 47°56′36″N 38°03′27″E
- Country: Ukraine
- Oblast: Donetsk Oblast
- Raion: Donetsk Raion
- Hromada: Makiivka urban hromada
- Elevation: 188 m (617 ft)

Population (2022)
  - Total: 455
- Time zone: UTC+2 (EET)
  - Summer (DST): UTC+3 (EEST)
- Postal code: 86195
- Area code: +380 6232

Vysoke (Ukrainian: Високе) is a rural settlement in Makiivka urban hromada, Donetsk Raion in Donetsk Oblast of Ukraine. Population is 455 (2022 estimate).

== Demographics ==
Native language as of the Ukrainian Census of 2001:

- Ukrainian 9.53%
- Russian 89.95%
