= Hruzko-Zorianske =

Urban locality in Donetsk Oblast, Ukraine

Hruzko-Zorianske Грузько-Зорянське
- Rural settlement
- Location of Hruzko-Zorianske within Donetsk Oblast#Location of Hruzko-Zorianske within Ukraine Hruzko-Zorianske (Ukraine)
- Coordinates: 47°56′44″N 38°05′01″E
- Country: Ukraine
- Oblast: Donetsk Oblast
- Raion: Donetsk Raion
- Hromada: Makiivka urban hromada
- Elevation: 125 m (410 ft)

Population (2022)
  - Total: 1,334
- Time zone: UTC+2 (EET)
  - Summer (DST): UTC+3 (EEST)
- Postal code: 86195
- Area code: +380 6232

Hruzko-Zorianske (Ukrainian: Грузько-Зорянське) is a rural settlement in Makiivka urban hromada, Donetsk Raion in Donetsk Oblast of Ukraine. Population: 1,334 (2022 estimate).

== Demographics ==
Native language as of the Ukrainian Census of 2001:

- Ukrainian 20.84%
- Russian 78.89%
- Belarusian 0.2%
- Moldovan (Romanian) 0.07%
