= Huselske =

Urban locality in Donetsk Oblast, Ukraine

Huselske Гусельське
- Rural settlement
- Location of Huselske within Donetsk Oblast#Location of Huselske within Ukraine Huselske (Ukraine)
- Coordinates: 47°59′39″N 38°07′18″E
- Country: Ukraine
- Oblast: Donetsk Oblast
- Raion: Donetsk Raion
- Hromada: Makiivka urban hromada
- Elevation: 150 m (490 ft)

Population (2022)
  - Total: 457
- Time zone: UTC+2 (EET)
  - Summer (DST): UTC+3 (EEST)
- Postal code: 86192
- Area code: +380 6232

Huselske (Ukrainian: Гусельське) is a rural settlement in Makiivka urban hromada, Donetsk Raion in Donetsk Oblast of Ukraine. Population: 457 (2022 estimate).

== Demographics ==
Native language as of the Ukrainian Census of 2001:

- Ukrainian 10.62%
- Russian 88.58%
- Bulgarian 0.4%
- Belarusian 0.07%
