= Olkhovatka, Ukraine =

Urban locality in Donetsk Oblast, Ukraine

Olkhovatka Ольховатка
- Rural settlement
- Location of Olkhovatka Olkhovatka (Ukraine)
- Coordinates: 48°14′44″N 38°24′17″E
- Country: Ukraine
- Oblast: Donetsk Oblast
- Raion: Horlivka Raion
- Elevation: 218 m (715 ft)

Population (2022)
  - Total: 2,972
- Time zone: UTC+2
  - Summer (DST): UTC+3
- Postal code: 86490-86491
- Area code: +380 6252

Olkhovatka (Ukrainian: Ольховатка) is a rural settlement in Horlivka Raion, Donetsk Oblast, eastern Ukraine. Population: 2,972 (2022 estimate).

== Demographics ==
Native language as of the Ukrainian Census of 2001:

- Ukrainian 13.46%
- Russian 86.08%
- Belarusian 0.28%
- Bulgarian and Hungarian) 0.03%
