= Vuhlehirsk =

City in Donetsk Oblast, Ukraine

Vuhlehirsk Вуглегірськ
- City
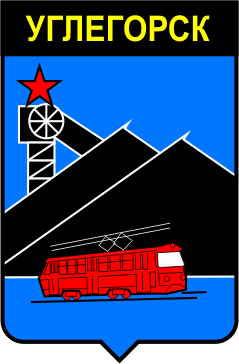
- Seal
- Interactive map of Vuhlehirsk
- Location within Donetsk Oblast Location within Ukraine
- Coordinates: 48.31°N 38.27°E
- Country: Ukraine
- Oblast: Donetsk Oblast
- Raion: Horlivka Raion
- Hromada: Vuhlehirsk urban hromada
- Founded: 1878

Population (2022)
  - Total: 7,294
- Time zone: UTC+2 (EET)
  - Summer (DST): UTC+3 (EEST)

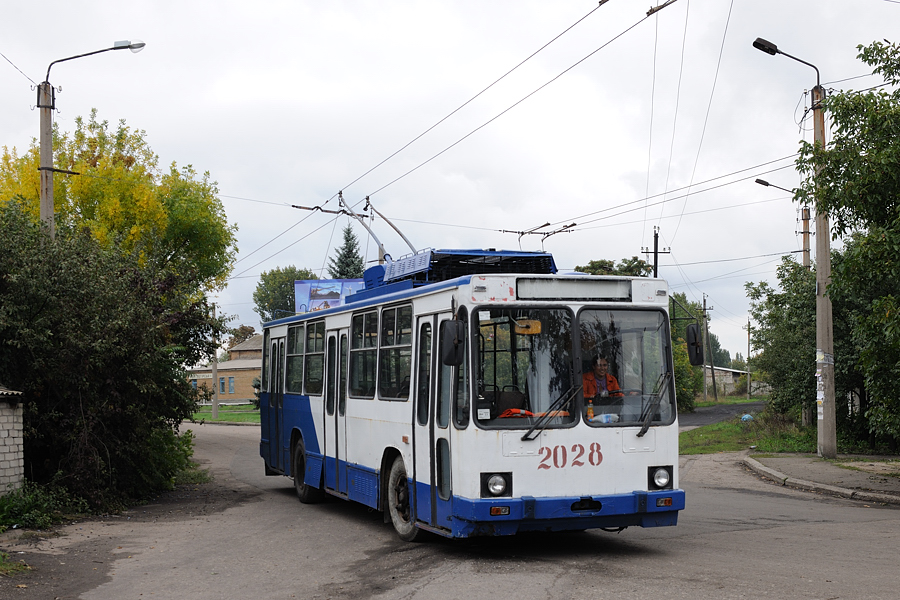
Vuhlehirsk trolleybus

Vuhlehirsk (Ukrainian: Вуглегірськ, pronounced [wʊɦleˈɦirsʲk]; Russian: Углегорск, romanized: Uglegorsk) is a city in Horlivka Raion, Donetsk Oblast (province) of Ukraine. Vuhlehirsk had a population of 8,226 in 2011; more recently, its population was estimated to be 7,294 (2022 estimate).

Vuhlehirsk is a district-level city in the Donetsk region, subordinated to the Yenakiieve city council. Vuhlehirsk is located in the south-eastern part of Ukraine at the distance of 61 km from the regional centre of Donetsk and 750 km from the capital of Ukraine, Kyiv. Its official date of foundation is 1879 – the year of the opening of the Khatsepetivka railway station (Vuhlehirsk was called Khatsepetivka village until 1958). In 2015, during the Battle of Debaltseve, the city was captured by pro-Russian separatists, who annexed the city into the self-declared Donetsk People's Republic. After a highly disputed referendum, the region was annexed by Russia in 2022. As of 2026, Russia has full control of the city.

== History ==
In February 2015, during the war in Donbas, the city was captured by separatist forces of the self-declared Donetsk People's Republic during the Battle of Debaltseve.

== Administrative status ==
On 11 December 2014, the city municipality of Vuhlehirsk, including the city of Vuhlehirsk, five other settlements (Bulavyne, Hrozne, Kayutyne, Krasny Pakhar, Savelivka), and two town municipalities (Olkhovatske and Bulavynske), were transferred from Yenakiieve Municipality to Bakhmut Raion.

The city was transferred to Horlivka Raion in July 2020, however, the pro-Russian occupation authorities of the Donetsk People's Republic do not recognize this new status.

== Transportation ==
Vuhlehirsk formerly had a tram and trolleybus system. Its tramway system operated from 10 November 1958 to 28 June 1980 and was serviced by KTM/KTP-1 trams and a few KTM/KTP-2 trams. Its trolleybus network operated from 8 July 1982 to 12 August 2014. The contact network was destroyed by the war in Donbas, a year after the successful addition of another trolleybus on the route, for a maximum of two vehicles during the peak.

== Demographics ==
The city's population was 10,309 in 2001. The majority of the town's population is ethnic Ukrainian, while Russians make up the second largest group in the city. In terms of native languages, a majority considers Russian to be their first language, while 40% speak Ukrainian natively. Other spoken languages are Belarusian and Armenian.

Ethnic composition as of the Ukrainian Census of 2001:

Ethnic groups in Vuhlehirsk
	percent
Ukrainians	61.95%
Russians	35.11%
Belarusians	1.61%
Tatars	0.37%
Moldovans	0.13%
others	0.83%

Native language as of the Ukrainian Census of 2001:

Native languages in Vuhlehirsk
	percent
Russian	58.9%
Ukrainian	40.1%
Others	0.5%
