= Malomykolaivka =

Malomykolaivka (Ukrainian: Маломиколаївка) may refer to the following places in Ukraine:

- Malomykolaivka, Dnipropetrovsk Oblast, village in Synelnykove Raion
- Malomykolaivka, Luhansk Oblast, urban-type settlement in Antratsyt Raion
