= Bulavynske =

Urban locality in Donetsk Oblast, Ukraine

Bulavynske Булавинське
- Rural settlement
- Location of Bulavynske Bulavynske (Ukraine)
- Coordinates: 48°15′18″N 38°20′01″E
- Country: Ukraine
- Oblast: Donetsk Oblast
- Raion: Horlivka Raion
- Elevation: 228 m (748 ft)

Population (2022)
  - Total: 3,070
- Time zone: UTC+2
  - Summer (DST): UTC+3
- Postal code: 86487
- Area code: +380 6252

Bulavynske (Ukrainian: Булавинське) is a rural settlement in Horlivka Raion, Donetsk Oblast, eastern Ukraine. Population: 3,070 (2022 estimate).

== Demographics ==
Native language as of the Ukrainian Census of 2001:

- Ukrainian 16.98%
- Russian 82.75%
- Belarusian 0.05%
- Moldovan (Romanian), Armenian, Polish and Jewish 0.03%
