= Krynychna =

Urban locality in Donetsk Oblast, Ukraine

Krynychna Кринична
- Rural settlement
- Location of Krynychna within Donetsk Oblast#Location of Krynychna within Ukraine Krynychna (Ukraine)
- Coordinates: 48°07′48″N 38°01′56″E
- Country: Ukraine
- Oblast: Donetsk Oblast
- Raion: Donetsk Raion
- Hromada: Makiivka urban hromada
- Elevation: 251 m (823 ft)

Population (2022)
  - Total: 4,459
- Time zone: UTC+2 (EET)
  - Summer (DST): UTC+3 (EEST)
- Postal code: 86183
- Area code: +380 6232

Krynychna (Ukrainian: Кринична) is a rural settlement in Makiivka urban hromada, Donetsk Raion in Donetsk Oblast of Ukraine. Population: 4,459 (2022 estimate).

== Demographics ==
Native language as of the Ukrainian Census of 2001:

- Ukrainian 12.61%
- Russian 87.09%
- Belarusian 0.15%
- Jewish 0.02%
