= Olenivka, Horlivka Raion, Donetsk Oblast =

Urban-type settlement in Ukraine

Olenivka Оленівка
- Rural settlement
- Interactive map of Olenivka
- Location in Donetsk Oblast Olenivka (Ukraine)
- Coordinates: 48°15′40″N 38°16′18″E
- Country: Ukraine
- Oblast: Donetsk Oblast
- Raion: Horlivka Raion
- Current form: 1938

Olenivka (Ukrainian: Оленівка; Russian: Оленовка) is a rural settlement in Donetsk Oblast, eastern Ukraine. Legally, it is administratively located in Horlivka Raion, but de facto administered by the Russian occupation administration as part of Bakhmut Raion. It has a population of 751 (2022 estimate).

== History ==
The settlement dates back from at least 1859, when it was mentioned in documents of the Ministry of the Interior of the Russian Empire.

In 2014 Olenivka was seized by the Russian-backed Donetsk People's Republic.

In the 2022 Russian invasion of Ukraine, Russian forces conducted "filtering" of people from occupied Mariupol in the settlement. All relatives of the Ukrainian military of the Armed Forces, former law enforcement officers, activists, journalists, and "suspicious" people were taken to the former penal colony No. 52 in Olenivka or to Izolyatsia prison in Donetsk.

== Demographics ==
According to the 2001 Ukrainian census, the settlement had a population of 964. Their native languages were 12.55% Ukrainian, 87.45% Russian.
