= Hruzko-Lomivka =

Rural settlement in Donetsk Oblast, Ukraine

Hruzko-Lomivka Грузько-Ломівка
- Rural settlement
- Location of Hruzko-Lomivka within Donetsk Oblast#Location of Hruzko-Lomivka within Ukraine Hruzko-Lomivka (Ukraine)
- Coordinates: 47°54′48″N 38°06′12″E
- Country: Ukraine
- Oblast: Donetsk Oblast
- Raion: Donetsk Raion
- Hromada: Makiivka urban hromada
- Elevation: 107 m (351 ft)

Population (2022)
  - Total: 614
- Time zone: UTC+2 (EET)
  - Summer (DST): UTC+3 (EEST)
- Postal code: 86197
- Area code: +380 6232

Hruzko-Lomivka (Ukrainian: Грузько-Ломівка) is a rural settlement in Makiivka urban hromada, Donetsk Raion in Donetsk Oblast of Ukraine. Population: 614 (2022 estimate).

== Demographics ==
Native language as of the Ukrainian Census of 2001:

- Ukrainian 47.41%
- Russian 52.31%
- Moldovan (Romanian) 0.14%
