= Krasnotorka =

Krasnotorka Красноторка
- Rural settlement
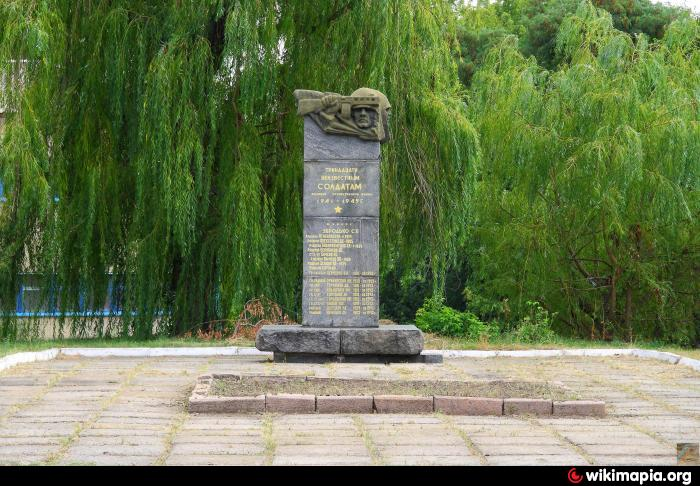

- Location of Krasnotorka Krasnotorka (Ukraine)
- Coordinates: 48°41′09″N 37°31′36″E
- Country: Ukraine
- Oblast: Donetsk Oblast
- Raion: Kramatorsk Raion
- Hromada: Kramatorsk urban hromada
- Elevation: 97 m (318 ft)

Population (2022)
  - Total: ▼2,915
- Time zone: UTC+2 (EET)
  - Summer (DST): UTC+3 (EEST)
- Postal code: 84395
- Area code: +380 626

Krasnotorka (Ukrainian: Красноторка) is a rural settlement in Kramatorsk Raion, Donetsk Oblast, eastern Ukraine, with a population of 2,915 (2022 estimate).

== Demographics ==
Native language as of the Ukrainian Census of 2001:

- Ukrainian 54.70%
- Russian 44.74%
- Belarusian and Armenian 0.22%
