= Oleksandrivske =

Urban locality in Donetsk Oblast, Ukraine

Oleksandrivske Олександрівське
- Rural settlement
- Location of Oleksandrivske Oleksandrivske (Ukraine)
- Coordinates: 48°16′26″N 38°17′09″E
- Country: Ukraine
- Oblast: Donetsk Oblast
- Raion: Horlivka Raion
- Elevation: 217 m (712 ft)

Population (2022)
  - Total: 1,524
- Time zone: UTC+2
  - Summer (DST): UTC+3
- Postal code: 86488
- Area code: +380 6252

Oleksandrivske (Ukrainian: Олександрівське) is a rural settlement in Horlivka Raion, Donetsk Oblast, eastern Ukraine. Population: 1,524 (2022 estimate).

== Demographics ==
Native language as of the Ukrainian Census of 2001:

- Ukrainian 12.28%
- Russian 86.82%
- Belarusian 0.50%
- Moldovan (Romanian) 0.10%
