= Hostre =

Urban locality in Donetsk Oblast, Ukraine

Hostre Гостре
- Rural settlement
- Interactive map of Hostre
- Location of Hostre Hostre (Ukraine)
- Coordinates: 47°59′30″N 37°24′07″E
- Country: Ukraine
- Oblast: Donetsk Oblast
- Raion: Pokrovsk Raion
- Elevation: 160 m (520 ft)

Population (2022)
  - Total: 557
- Time zone: UTC+2
  - Summer (DST): UTC+3
- Postal code: 85493
- Area code: +380 6237

Hostre (Ukrainian: Гостре; Russian: Острое, romanized: Ostroye) is a rural settlement in Pokrovsk Raion, Donetsk Oblast, eastern Ukraine. The population is 557 (2022 estimate).

During the Russian invasion of Ukraine, Russian forces claimed to have taken control over the settlement on 25 September 2024.

== Demographics ==
Native language as of the Ukrainian Census of 2001:

- Ukrainian 28.59%
- Russian 71.41%
