= Yasynivka, Donetsk Oblast =

Urban locality in Donetsk Oblast, Ukraine

Yasynivka Ясинівка
- Rural settlement
- Location of Yasynivka within Donetsk Oblast#Location of Yasynivka within Ukraine Yasynivka (Ukraine)
- Coordinates: 48°8′9″N 37°55′49″E
- Country: Ukraine
- Oblast: Donetsk Oblast
- Raion: Donetsk Raion
- Hromada: Makiivka urban hromada
- Elevation: 174 m (571 ft)

Population (2022)
  - Total: 3,588
- Time zone: UTC+2 (EET)
  - Summer (DST): UTC+3 (EEST)
- Postal code: 86181
- Area code: +380 6232

Yasynivka (Ukrainian: Ясинівка) is a rural settlement in Makiivka urban hromada, Donetsk Raion in Donetsk Oblast of Ukraine. Population: 3,588 (2022 estimate).

== Demographics ==
Native language as of the Ukrainian Census of 2001:

- Ukrainian 62.8%
- Russian 37.03%
- Belarusian 0.14%
