= Vvedenka =

Vvedenka Введенка
- Settlement
- Location within Voronezh Oblast Location within Russia
- Coordinates: 51°42′N 40°50′E
- Country: Russia
- Region: Voronezh Oblast
- District: Ertilsky District
- Time zone: UTC+3:00

Vvedenka (Russian: Введенка) is a rural locality (a settlement) in Pervoertilskoye Rural Settlement, Ertilsky District, Voronezh Oblast, Russia. The population was 331 as of 2010. There are 4 streets.

== Geography ==
Vvedenka is located 15 km south of Ertil, the district's administrative centre, by road. Pervomaysky is the nearest rural locality.
