= Lyman Raion, Donetsk Oblast =

Lyman Raion Лиманський район
- Raion
- Coordinates: 48°55′56″N 37°56′33″E
- Country: Ukraine
- Region: Donetsk Oblast
- Established: N/A
- Admin. center: Lyman
- Subdivisions: List: — city councils; — settlement councils; — rural councils; Number of localities: — cities; — urban-type settlements; 31 — villages; — rural settlements

Area
  - Total: 1,018 km^{2} (393 sq mi)

Population
  - Total: 21,881
  - Density: 21.49/km^{2} (55.67/sq mi)
- Time zone: UTC+02:00 (EET)
  - Summer (DST): UTC+03:00 (EEST)
- Postal index: 873-XX
- Area code: 380
- Website: Verkhovna Rada website

Lyman Raion (Ukrainian: Лиманський район, romanized: Lymans'kyi raion; Russian: Лиманский район, romanized: Limanskiy raion) was a raion (district) within Donetsk Oblast in eastern Ukraine. Its administrative center was Lyman, which was separately incorporated as a city of oblast significance and did not belong to the district. Its area was 1,018 km^{2} (393 sq mi) and its population was approximately 21,881 (2013 est.).

In 2016, Lyman Raion was abolished and merged into Lyman municipality (Lyman urban hromada, formerly Krasnyi Lyman United Territorial Community).

== History ==
Before 1917, the raion was part of the Kharkov Governorate.

Until May 2016, raion was known as Krasnyi Lyman Raion (Ukrainian: Краснолиманський район). On 19 May 2016, Verkhovna Rada adopted a decision to rename Krasnyi Lyman Raion to Lyman Raion according to the law prohibiting names of Communist origin. Krasnyi Lyman was previously renamed to Lyman according to the same law.

== Demographics ==
As of the 2001 Ukrainian census:

Ethnicity

- Ukrainians: 83.3%
- Russians: 15%

== Environment ==
The national nature park Svyati Hory is 404.48 km^{2} and it contains plant life from the region of the Seversky Donets River. The park contains over 1,008 different plants, almost 20% of them being endemic plants. Forty-six plants that grow here and 50 types of animals are entered into the Ukraine's Red Book of Rare Species. The fauna contains 43 types of mammals, 194 types of birds, 10 types of reptiles, 9 types of amphibians and 40 types of fish.

Another nature preserve is the Melova Flora. Known for its plant life, the preserve has an area of 11.34 km^{2}.

== See also ==
- Administrative divisions of Donetsk Oblast
