= Pryberezhne, Donetsk Oblast =

Urban locality in Donetsk Oblast, Ukraine

Pryberezhne Прибережне
- Rural settlement
- Location of Pryberezhne Pryberezhne (Ukraine)
- Coordinates: 48°15′09″N 38°19′07″E
- Country: Ukraine
- Oblast: Donetsk Oblast
- Raion: Horlivka Raion
- Elevation: 209 m (686 ft)

Population (2022)
  - Total: 152
- Time zone: UTC+2
  - Summer (DST): UTC+3
- Postal code: 86487
- Area code: +380 6252

Pryberezhne (Ukrainian: Прибережне) is a rural settlement in Yenakiieve urban hromada, Horlivka Raion, Donetsk Oblast, eastern Ukraine. Population: 152 (2022 estimate).

== Demographics ==
Native language as of the Ukrainian Census of 2001:

- Ukrainian 48.21%
- Russian 50.00%
- Belarusian and Moldovan (Romanian) 0.61%
