= Novohryhorivka, Kramatorsk Raion, Donetsk Oblast =

Novohryhorivka Новогригорівка
- Rural settlement
- Location of Novohryhorivka Novohryhorivka (Ukraine)
- Coordinates: 48°34′44″N 37°25′17″E
- Country: Ukraine
- Oblast: Donetsk Oblast
- Raion: Kramatorsk Raion
- Hromada: Druzhkivka urban hromada
- Elevation: 94 m (308 ft)

Population (2022)
  - Total: 325
- Time zone: UTC+2 (EET)
  - Summer (DST): UTC+3 (EEST)
- Postal code: 84292
- Area code: +380 6267

Novohryhorivka (Ukrainian: Новогригорівка) is a rural settlement in Kramatorsk Raion, Donetsk Oblast, eastern Ukraine. Population: 325 (2022 estimate).

== Demographics ==
Native language as of the Ukrainian Census of 2001:

- Ukrainian 90.62%
- Russian 8.40%
- Armenian 0.99%
