= Volodymyrivka, Volnovakha Raion, Donetsk Oblast =

Urban locality in Donetsk Oblast, Ukraine

Volodymyrivka Володимирівка
- Rural settlement
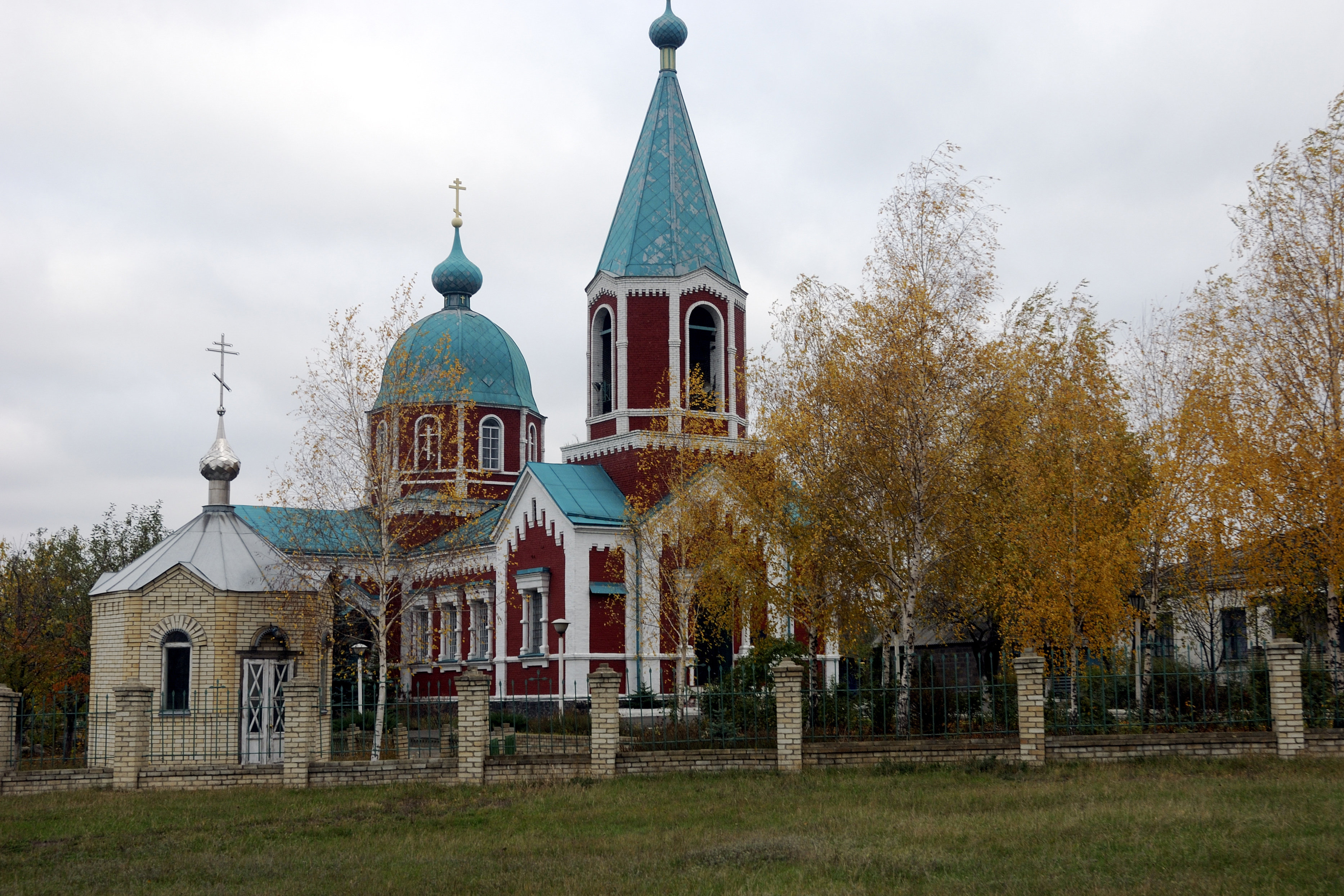

- Location of Volodymyrivka within Donetsk Oblast#Location of Volodymyrivka within Ukraine Volodymyrivka (Ukraine)
- Coordinates: 47°43′38″N 37°24′22″E
- Country: Ukraine
- Oblast: Donetsk Oblast
- Raion: Volnovakha Raion
- Founded: 1840
- Elevation: 188 m (617 ft)

Population (2022)
  - Total: 6,047
- Time zone: UTC+2 (EET)
  - Summer (DST): UTC+3 (EEST)
- Postal code: 85721
- Area code: +380 6244

Volodymyrivka (Ukrainian: Володимирівка; Russian: Влади́мировка) is an urban-type settlement in Volnovakha Raion, Donetsk Oblast, eastern Ukraine. Population: 6,047 (2022 estimate).
