= Hrafske, Donetsk Oblast =

Urban locality in Donetsk Oblast, Ukraine

Hrafske Графське
- Rural settlement
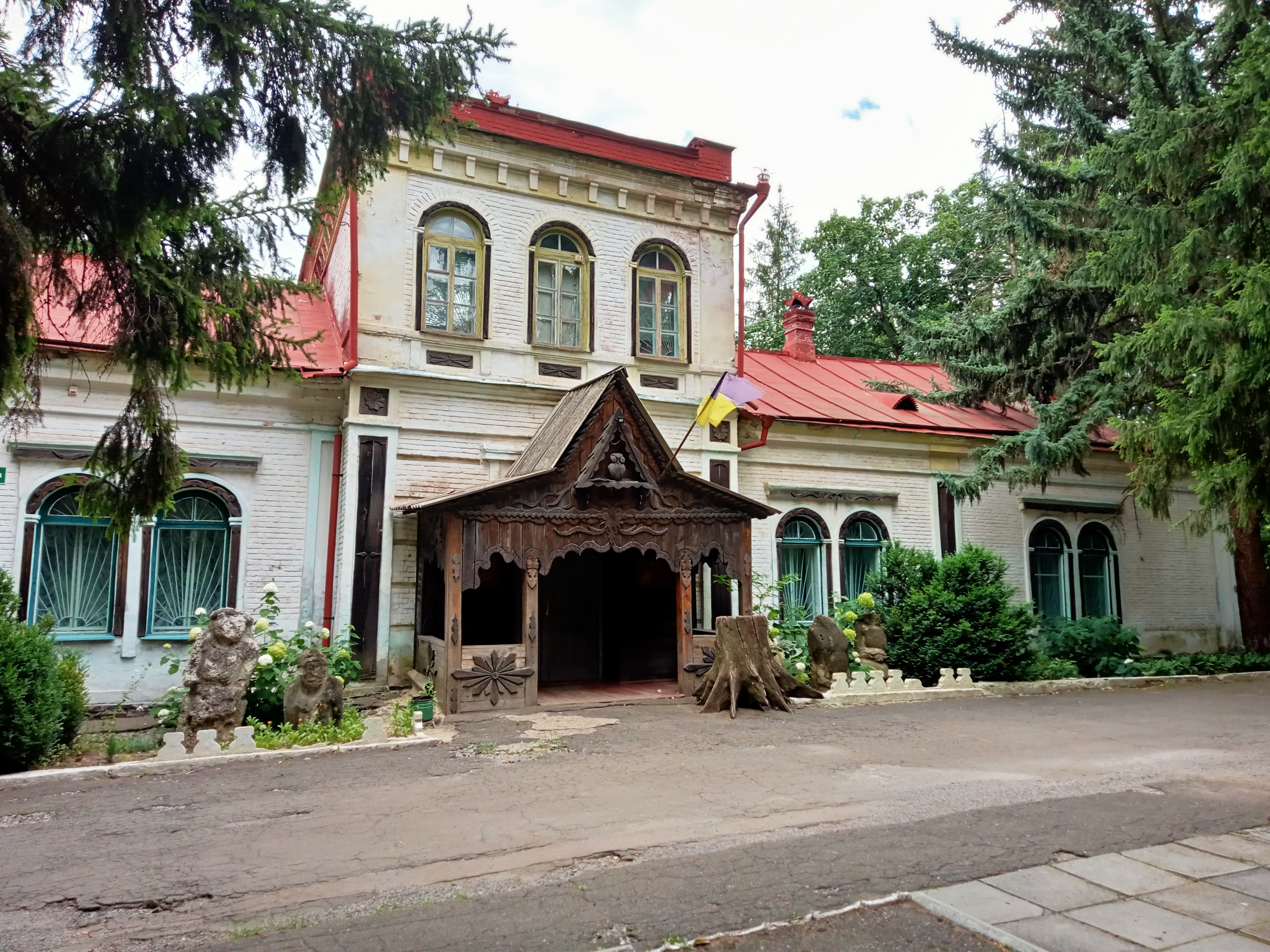
- Interactive map of Hrafske
- Location of Hrafske within Donetsk Oblast#Location of Hrafske within Ukraine Hrafske (Ukraine)
- Coordinates: 47°40′17″N 37°24′39″E
- Country: Ukraine
- Oblast: Donetsk Oblast
- Raion: Volnovakha Raion
- Elevation: 233 m (764 ft)

Population (2022)
  - Total: 380
- Time zone: UTC+2 (EET)
  - Summer (DST): UTC+3 (EEST)
- Postal code: 85725
- Area code: +380 6244

Hrafske (Ukrainian: Графське) is a rural settlement in Volnovakha Raion, Donetsk Oblast, eastern Ukraine. Population: 380 (2022 estimate).
