= Novomykolaivka, Druzhkivka urban hromada, Kramatorsk Raion, Donetsk Oblast =

Novomykolaivka Новомиколаївка
- Rural settlement
- Location of Novomykolaivka Novomykolaivka (Ukraine)
- Coordinates: 48°33′44″N 37°22′14″E
- Country: Ukraine
- Oblast: Donetsk Oblast
- Raion: Kramatorsk Raion
- Hromada: Druzhkivka urban hromada
- Elevation: 88 m (289 ft)

Population (2022)
  - Total: 78
- Time zone: UTC+2 (EET)
  - Summer (DST): UTC+3 (EEST)
- Postal code: 84297
- Area code: +380 6267

Novomykolaivka (Ukrainian: Новомиколаївка; Russian: Новониколаевка, romanized: Novonikolaevka) is a rural settlement in Kramatorsk Raion, Donetsk Oblast, eastern Ukraine. Population: 78 (2022 estimate). By 14 August 2026, it was captured by Russian forces.

== Demographics ==
Native language as of the Ukrainian Census of 2001:

- Ukrainian 69.49%
- Russian 30.51%
