= Horlivka Raion =

Subdivision of Donetsk Oblast, Ukraine

Coordinates: 48°13′N 38°27′E

Horlivka Raion Горлівський район
- Raion
- Interactive map of Horlivka Raion
- Country: Ukraine
- Oblast: Donetsk Oblast
- Established: 2020
- Admin. center: Horlivka
- Subdivisions: 9 hromadas

Area
  - Total: 2,468.4 km^{2} (953.1 sq mi)

Population (2021)
  - Total: 662,069
  - Density: 268.22/km^{2} (694.68/sq mi)

Horlivka Raion (Ukrainian: Горлівський район, romanized: Horlivskyi raion; Russian: Горловский район, romanized: Gorlovsky rayon) is a prospective raion (district) of Donetsk Oblast, Ukraine. It was formally created in July 2020 as part of the reform of administrative divisions of Ukraine. The center of the raion is in the town of Horlivka. Population: 662,069 (2022 estimate). The area of the raion is occupied by Russia, which continues to use the old, pre-2020 administrative divisions of Ukraine. Prior to the 2022 Russian invasion of Ukraine, portions of the northern Maiorsk district of Horlivka were the only notable areas of the raion under Ukrainian government control.

== Subdivisions ==
Raion consists of 9 hromadas:

- Chystiakove urban hromada
- Debaltseve urban hromada
- Horlivka urban hromada
- Khrestivka urban hromada
- Shakhtarsk urban hromada
- Snizhne urban hromada
- Vuhlehirsk urban hromada
- Yenakiieve urban hromada
- Zhdanivka urban hromada
