= Donetsk Raion =

Subdivision of Donetsk Oblast, Ukraine

Coordinates: 47°55′N 38°17′E

Donetsk Raion Донецький район
- Raion
- Interactive map of Donetsk Raion
- Country: Ukraine
- Oblast: Donetsk Oblast
- Established: 2020
- Admin. center: Donetsk
- Subdivisions: 6 hromadas

Area
  - Total: 2,895.1 km^{2} (1,117.8 sq mi)

Population (2022)
  - Total: 1,484,514
  - Density: 512.77/km^{2} (1,328.1/sq mi)

Donetsk Raion (Ukrainian: Донецький район, romanized: Donetskyi raion; Russian: Донецкий район) is a prospective raion (district) of Donetsk Oblast, Ukraine. It was formally created in July 2020 as part of the reform of administrative divisions of Ukraine. The center of the raion is in the city of Donetsk. Population: 1,484,514 (2022 estimate). Most of the area of the raion is occupied by Russia, which continues to use the old, pre-2020 administrative divisions of Ukraine. Much of the raion was occupied by Russian-controlled militias during the Donbas war until the village of Kruta Balka was the only unoccupied locality. In the 2022 Russian invasion, the remainder was occupied.

== Subdivisions ==
Raion consists of 6 hromadas:

- Amvrosiivka urban hromada
- Donetsk urban hromada
- Ilovaisk urban hromada
- Khartsyzk urban hromada
- Makiivka urban hromada
- Yasynuvata urban hromada
