= Rural settlement =

Settlement in an area defined as rural

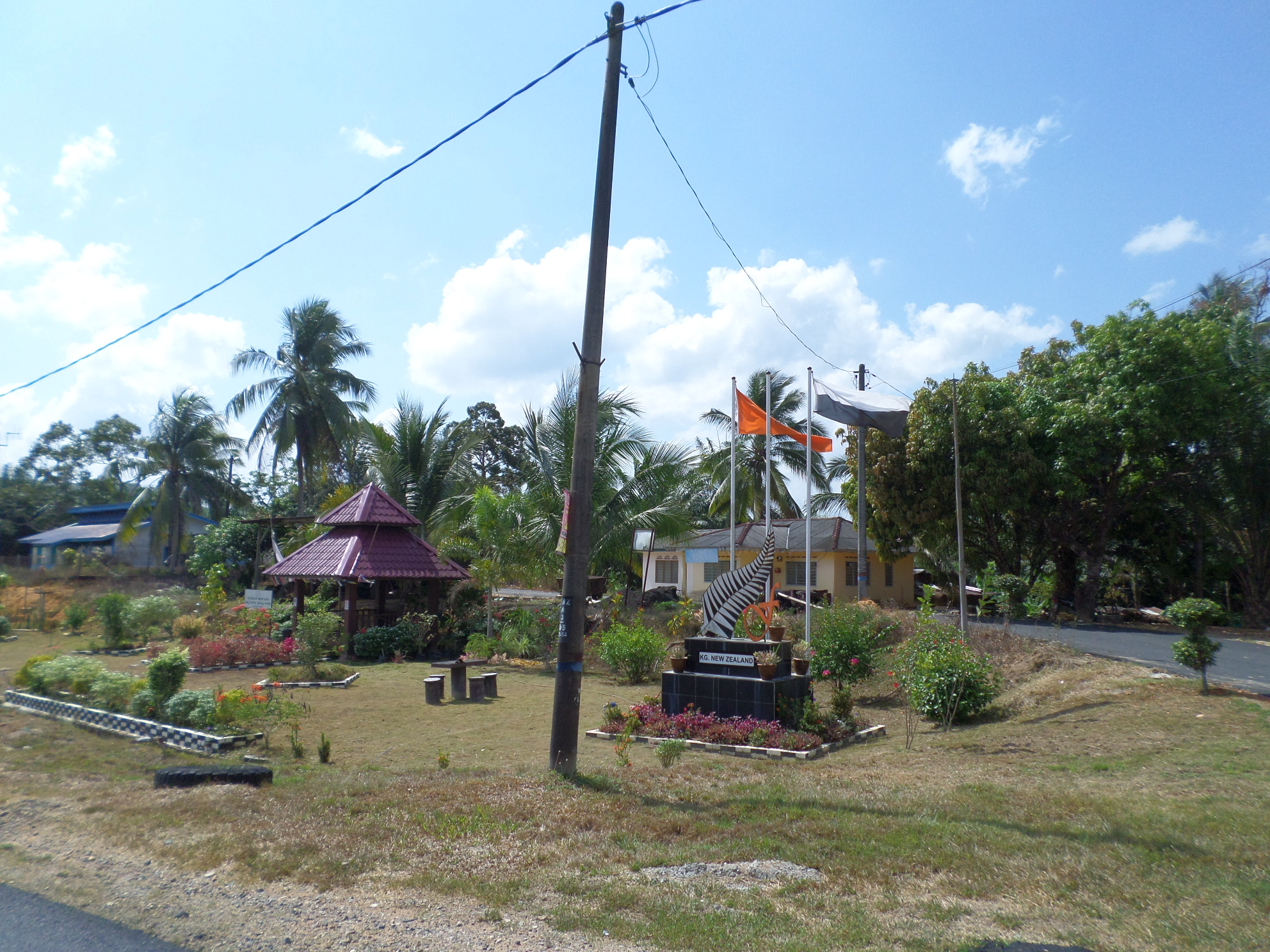
A rural settlement in Pahang, Malaysia.

The definition of a rural settlement depends on the country, in some countries, a rural settlement is any settlement in the areas defined as rural by a governmental office, e.g., by the national census bureau. This may include even rural towns. In some others, rural settlements traditionally do not include towns.

Common types of rural settlements are villages, hamlets, and farms. They may be dispersed.

Traditionally, rural settlements were associated with agriculture. In modern times other types of rural communities have been developed.

The settlement where the occupation of majority of people relate to the local natural resources are called rural settlement for example, (1) settlement of fisheries along a sea coast, (2) settlement of tribal people in a forest area and (3) settlement of farmers along the banks of rivers.

Rural settlements show the reciprocal relationship of human occupance features and environment.

== Malaysia ==
Since 6 July 1956 in then-Malaya, rural settlements in Malaysia are handled by the Federal Land Development Authority.

== Russia ==
A municipal rural settlement in Russia is a type of municipal formation.

The term "rural settlement" is also sometimes used either as a synonym for all rural localities, or for settlements of rural type in particular.

== See also ==
- Urban settlement (disambiguation)
