= Minuta slavy =

Russian television talent show

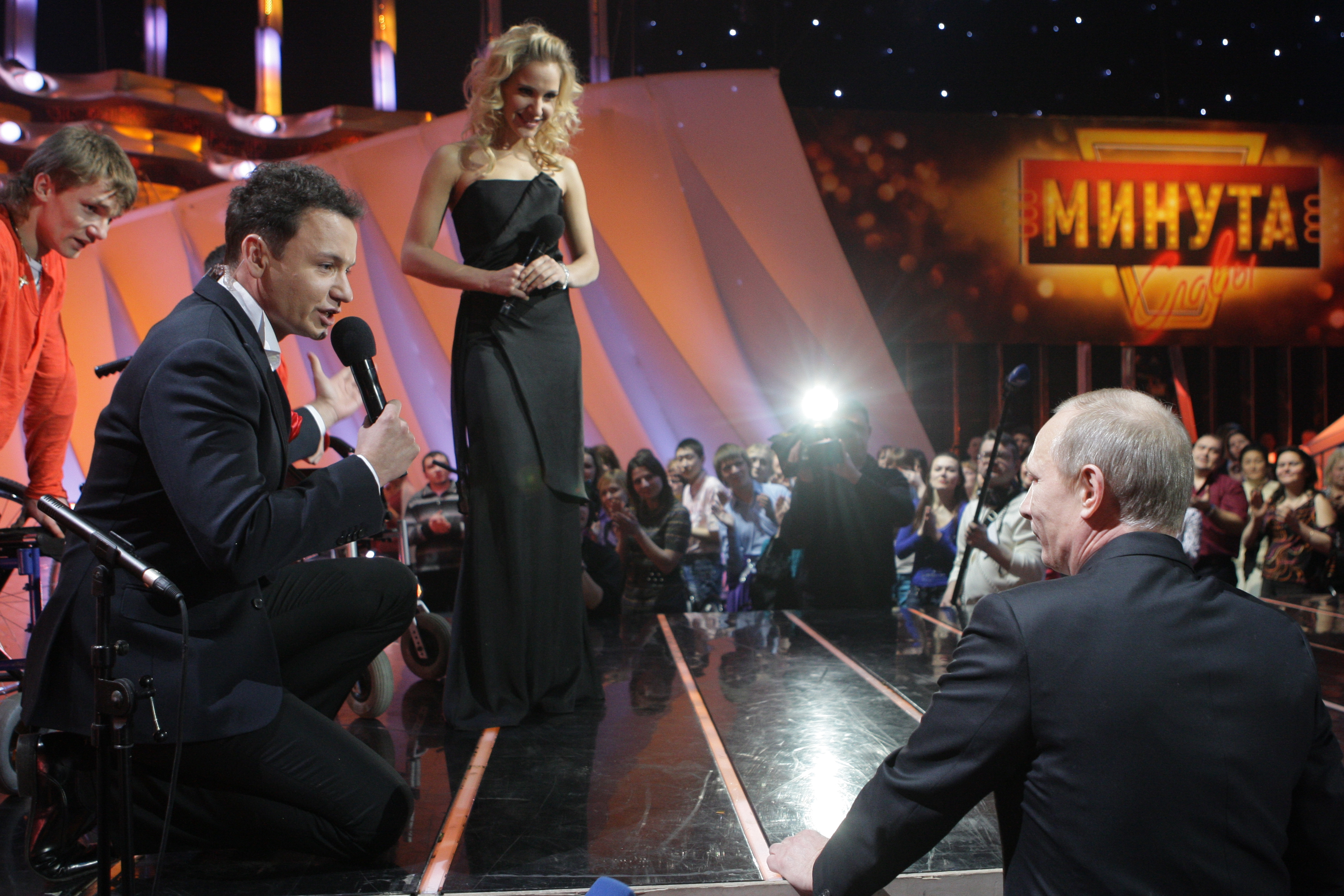
- Russian: Минута славы
- Presented by: Garik Martirosyan (seasons 1-2); Alexander Tsekalo (season 3); Alexander Oleshko (seasons 4-8); Ville Haapasalo (season 4); Yuliya Kovalchuk (seasons 5-7); Dmitry Shepelev (seasons 6-8); Mikhail Boyarsky (season 9)
- Judges: Alexander Maslyakov (seasons 1-8); Larisa Guzeyeva (seasons 6-8); Tatyana Tolstaya (seasons 1-2); Leonid Parfyonov (season 4); Maria Shukshina (season 5); Sergei Yursky (seasons 7, 9); Sergei Svetlakov (season 9); Renata Litvinova (season 9); Vladimir Posner (season 9)
- Country of origin: Russia
- No. of seasons: 9
- No. of episodes: 164

Production
- Producers: Krasnyi Kvadrat (2009–present); Belaya Studiya (2009–present); Soho Production (2007–2008); VID (2007–2008)
- Production location: Moscow
- Running time: 110 minutes

Original release
- Network: 1TV
- Release: 17 February 2007 – 29 April 2017

Minute of Fame (Russian: Минута славы, romanized: Minuta slavy, IPA: [mʲɪˈnutə ˈslavɨ]) is a Russian television talent show competition originating from the Got Talent series and which started in February 2007 on 1TV. For the first two seasons it was hosted by Garik Martirosyan, replaced in the 3rd season by Alexander Tsekalo, then in the 4th season the hosts were Alexander Oleshko and Ville Haapasalo, and in the 5th and 6th seasons Julia Kovalchuk took over from Haapasalo.

== Judges ==
- Alexander Maslyakov, host of KVN, head judge, seasons 1-8;
- Leonid Parfyonov, journalist, season 4.
- Tatyana Tolstaya, writer, seasons 1-3.
- Mariya Shukshina, TV host show season 5.
- Larissa Guzeyeva, TV host show seasons 6-8.
- In the first season, the role of third judge was filled by different visitor, but in the second season a third permanent judge appeared is Alexander Tsekalo. In the third and following seasons, the third judge was again a series of visitors.
- Sergei Yursky, actor, seasons 7 and 9.
- Sergei Svetlakov, actor, TV host, season 9.
- Renata Litvinova, actress, TV host, season 9.
- Vladimir Posner, TV journalist, writer and political thinker, season 9.

== Rules ==
In the qualifying rounds participants appear before the judges and an audience to demonstrate their talent, and from there are either rejected by the judges or moved on to the next round. In the 1st season each judge had the ability to call a halt to the demonstration with a rejection button, if all 3 judges pressed the button, the demonstration was interrupted and the participant rejected. In the 2nd this was removed and each participant could perform their full demonstration, after which each judges voted «yes» or «no», with the majority ruling and the head judge acting as tie-breaker.

Beginning with the 2nd season the semi-finals were removed, participant who passed the qualifying rounds went straight to the final round.

In the 1st-3rd seasons, the winner of the show received 1,000,000 rubles.

In the 4th season the winner of the show received 10,000,000 rubles.

From the middle of the 4th season (from October 5 to December 29, 2009) per week from network «Eldorado» played out cash prizes among viewers.

In the 5th season the winner of the show received 1,000,000 rubles, 1 kg of gold and a contract with the Moscow Circus.

In the 6th season, the show underwent a major change. Firstly the name was changed to «Minute of Fame - Dreams Come True». At the end of each qualifying round the jury picks 1 act, not necessarily one who passed on to audience voting, and gives them a choice: either have their dream fulfilled, or be entered directly into the finals without requiring the audience to vote them there, meaning they still have a chance to win the 1,000,000 rubles prizel. Second, the participants were given mentors. Carmen Rust and Edgard Zapashny, then Svetlana Druzhinina and Igor Zhizhikin from the 9th qualifying round onwards, would instruct participants in circus genres, and Anastasia Zavorotnyuk and Yegor Druzhinin would mentor those in other artistic genres.

In the 7th season of the show on the new scenario, part of the participants' «Minute of Fame» now is not removed in the studio and outdoors. This time, the organizers decided that participants must represent Russia, and therefore the motto of the project at this time is «Minute of Fame is sweeping the country». The participation of foreign visitors is now excluded. In honor of the five-year anniversary of the producers even changed the standard rules of the program. Now the film crew travels to cities in Russia and filmes unique acts right away from the contestants who for various reasons can't come to Moscow. By new rules it's for such numbers jury does not vote. Vote for them audience in the hall. In the semifinal get those participants for whom the vote of at least 15% of the audience in the studio. There is also no mentors, who had previously supported the contestants.

In the 8th Olympic season participants compete for the right to participate in the opening ceremony of the Winter Olympic Games in Sochi and to win one million rubles. In this season in the chair member of the jury, along with the usual three judges in each issue necessarily representative of the sport was alone, as this is Olympic season. Also in the VIP-box in each issue were present different guests with their exclusive gifts that they in the end of the tour participant were presented to get noticed. In the semifinals, participants fought a duel in the end only one of the duel taking place in the final, and the rest are eliminated. The finale was divided in two parts: in the first, participants fought for a million rubles, while the second are for participating in the opening ceremony of XXII Olympic Winter Games in Sochi.

In 9th Anniversary season the rules has changed. To advance the next rounds, the contestant have to get no less than three jury's «yes». If the contestant gets two «yes» and two «no», his destiny is in his own hands, he ought to toss a «coin of fame». If the side of a coin is the white, then the contestant won't leave the game, bu if it is the red, he is eliminated. Top prize is 5,000,000 rubles (second place — 3,000,000 rubles, third place — 1,000,000 rubles).

== Series overview ==
=== Season 1 (2007) ===
Finals

- 18.05.2007, Guest judge - Michael Zadornov.

№	Participant	City	Talent	Alexander Maslyakov	Tatiana Tolstaya	Michael Zadornov	Result
1	Svetlana and Sergei Chuyko	Moscow	performance with bubbles	-	-	-	-
2	Aznavur	Sochi	violinist	-	-	-	-
3	"Cristal harmony"	Saint Petersburg	game on glasses	-	-	-	-
4	Artyom Shchukin	Saratov	magician	-	-	-	-
5	"Lemon-show"	Moscow	breakdancers	-	-	-	-
6	Ravil Nasyrov	Kazan	psychic	-	-	-	-
7	Roman Rogolev	Novosibirsk	balalaika	-	-	-	-
8	Simon Oganisyan	Lipetsk	juggler	-	-	-	-
9	"Udi"	Omsk	dancers	-	-	-	favorite

- 19.05.2007, Guest judge - Michael Zadornov.

№	Participant	City	Talent	Alexander Maslyakov	Tatiana Tolstaya	Michael Zadornov	Result
1	Irina Kazakova	Moscow	gymnast	-	-	-	-
2	Alexander and Lilia Kurdyumovs	Odesa	musicians	-	-	-	-
3	"Mad heels"	Vladimir	степ	-	-	-	-
4	Daniel and Kirill Kalutskikh	Moscow	acrobats	-	-	-	favorites
5	"Duke time"	Odesa	singers	-	-	-	-
6	Maksim Tokayev	Shchekino	accordionist	-	-	-	winner
7	Georgy Oganisyan	Lipetsk	juggler	-	-	-	-
8	"3 sisters"	Ivanovo	singers	-	-	-	-
9	Garik	Saint Petersburg	magician	-	-	-	-
14	Ilya Strakhov and Lolita	Odesa	acrobat and singer	-	-	-	-

- 25.05.2007, Superfinal.

№	Participant	City	Talent	Alexandr Abdulov	Natalya Lagoda	Oleg Jankovskij	Marina Golub
1	Maria Maksimchuk and Igor Nikolayev	Mytishchi	singers	7	10	6	9
2	Alexander Yachmenyov and Kristina Orbakayte	Omsk	singer and saxophonist	7	10	7	9
3	Denis Prilipko and "Duna" group	Yekaterinburg	ballet and singers	9	10	8	9
4	Levan Belauri and Tamik Bayev, Anita Tsoy	Vladikavkaz	drummers and singer	8	10	8	10
5	Georgy Oganisyan and Eugeny Aldonin	Lipetsk	jugglers	9	10	9	10
6	Alexandra Kozlova and Soso Pavliashvili	Moscow	singers	9	10	8	9
7	Aznavur and "Gorod 312"	Sochi	violinist and musicians	7	10	6	10
8	Alexander Kurdyumov and Vladimir Kuzmin	Odesa	musician and singer	7	10	9	10
9	Eugeny Kuznetsov, Ravil Nasyrov, Alexander Markov, Simon Oganisyan and "Fabrika" group	Russia	dangerous stunts, psychic, stunts, juggler and singers	9	10	9	10
10	Garik and "Tea for two"	Saint Petersburg	robo-cop and singers	9	10	6	9
11	"Duke time" group and Tatyana Ovsiyenko	Odesa	singers	8	10	9	10
12	"Cristal harmony" and Nikolas Tsiskaridze	Saint Petersburg	playing music on glasses and singer	8	10	9	10
13	Scott Scotch and Nox Raul	-	singers	8	10	8	10

- 26.05.2007, Award winners

№	Participant	City	Talent	Alexandr Tsekalo	Ludmila Senchina	Muslim Magomaev	Dima Bilan
1	Maxim Tokayev and Stas Piekha	Shchekino	accordionist and singer	10	10	10	10
2	Irina Kazakova and Dmitry Malikov	Moscow	gymnast and singer	10	10	9	10
3	Michael Ilyayev, Lia Pogosyan, Alexander Fazylzyanov and "Blestyashchiye" group	Russia	dancers and singers	9	10	7	9
4	Roman Rogalyov and "Ivanushki International" group	Novosibirsk	balalaika and singers	8	10	6	9
5	Anastasia Kovalenko and Boris Moiseyev	Moscow	singers	8	10	7	9
6	Olga Bibik and the symphonic ensemble "Elegans"	Moscow	singer and musicians	9	10	8	10
7	Artyom Shchukin and Amayak Akopyan	Saratov	magicians	9	10	9	10
8	Julia Kova & Nox and "Udi" group	Tomsk	singers and dancers	8	10	7	9
9	Daniil and Kirill Kalutskikh and Vladimir Turchnsky	Moscow	acrobats and sportsman	9	10	9	10
10	Olesya Pivova and "Dinamit" group	Perm	dancer and singers	8	10	7	9
11	Ramil Shakirov and Oleg Bezinskikh	Kartaly	singers	8	10	6	9
12	Viktor Tsaryov and Dmitry Sychyov	Khabarovsk	jugglers	8	10	7	9
13	"Udi" group and "Reflex" group	Tomsk	dancers and singers	9	10	8	10
14	"Mad hells" and Alexander Buynov	Vladimir	step and singer	9	10	8	10
15	"3 sisters" group and "Chelsi" group	Ivanovo	singers	9	10	9	10

=== Season 2 (2007) ===
Finals

- 11.11.2007

№	Participant	City	Talent	Alexander Maslyakov	Tatyana Tolstaya	Alexander Tsekalo	Result
1	"Udi-junior"	Tomsk	break dancer	-	-	-	-
2	"Constellation"	Moscow	singers	-	-	-	-
3	Maya Kolodina	Moscow	singer	-	-	-	-
4	Alexei Goloborodko	Tula	plastic	-	-	-	favorite
5	Sosnov boarding school for orphans	Tambov region	dancers	-	-	-	favorite
6	Dmitry Bubin	Salaspils	juggler	-	-	-	-
7	Ivan Bokov and Alina Vilinskaya	Domodedovo	stunts	-	-	-	-
8	Yegor Kupriyanov	Izhevsk	plastic	-	-	-	-
9	Narek Akopyan	Volzhsky	singer	-	-	-	-
10	"Twins"	Riga	dancers	-	-	-	favorite

- 25.11.2007

№	Participant	City	Talent	Alexander Maslyakov	Tatyana Tolstaya	Alexander Tsekalo	Result
1	Galina Chogovadze	Moscow	tricks with a dog	-	-	-	-
2	Anastasia Sorokova	Podolsk	singer	-	-	-	favorite
3	Sergei Melnikov and Oksana Grigorenko	Moscow	disguises	-	-	-	-
4	Denis Fatkin	Penza	appearance with the ladder	-	-	-	favorite
5	Margarita Kim	Moscow	dancer	-	-	-	-
6	Quartet "Akrofly"	Moscow region	acrobats	-	-	-	-
7	Rustem Valeyev	Kazan	musician	-	-	-	-
8	"Takeoff" ensemble	Omsk	mutewomen	-	-	-	favorite
9	Rafael Zotov	Moscow	magician	-	-	-	-
10	"Quadrate"	г. Bolshaya Glushitsa	a fashion show of the waste	-	-	-	-
11	Leysan Zagrutdinova	Sestroretsk	singer	-	-	-	-
12	Oleg Khavronich	Moscow	snakes charmer	-	-	-	-
13	"Hope"	Izhevsk	dancers	-	-	-	-

- 02.12.2007

№	Participant	City	Talent	Alexander Maslyakov	Tatyana Tolstaya	Alexander Tsekalo	Result
1	Gigant show	Yevpatoria	dancers	-	-	-	-
2	Oksana Lepskaya	Riga	singer	-	-	-	-
3	Valeria Semyokhina, Marina Larichkina, Gulnara Bayramova	Kaluga	jugglers	-	-	-	-
4	Marat Shaydulin	Kazan	juggler	-	-	-	-
5	Michael Mashko	Ufa	singer	-	-	-	-
6	Roman Timofeyev	Irkutsk	balalaika	-	-	-	-
7	Yekaterina and Svetlana Zaytsevs	Shuya	acrobats	-	-	-	-
8	Eugeny Korytchinkov	Ryazan	limericks	-	-	-	-
9	Albert Verkholyak	Petrozavodsk	step	-	-	-	favorite
10	Alexander Ovsyannikov	Melitopol	plastic	-	-	-	-
11	Ryotr and Kirill Levins	Novosibirsk	stunts	-	-	-	-
12	"APL show"	Moscow	fire show	-	-	-	favorite
13	Dmitry Bulkin	Kubinka	equilibrist	-	-	-	favorite

- 09.12.2007, Super Final

№	Participant	City	Talent	Alexander Tsekalo	Kristina Orbakaite	Ilya Reznik	Dima Bilan
1	"APL show"	Moscow	fire show	6	10	9	7
2	Anastasia Sorokova	Podolsk	singer	6	10	7	9
3	"Twins" and Denis Prilipko	Riga and Yekaterinburg	dancers	6	10	8	8
4	Rafael Zotov and Artyom Shchukin	Moscow	magic	3	10	3	7
5	"Hope" collective	Izhevsk	dancers	4	10	4	6
6	Simon and Georgy Oganesyans and Denis Fatkin	Penza	jugglers and ladder tricks	9	10	9	8
7	"Takeoff" ensemble and "Stars factory-7"	Omsk	singers	9	10	7	8
8	Sultan Khamdulayev and Eliza Annam	Makhachkala and Moscow	dancers	3	10	6	9
9	Oksana Lepskaya, Svetlana and Sergei Chuyko	Riga	singer, soapbubble show	4	10	7	5
10	Alexei Goloborodko and "Crystal harmony"	Tula	plastic, glass game	9	10	9	9
11	"Udi-junior" and "Udi"	Tomsk	dancers	8	10	4	6
12	Dmitry Bubin and Ravil Nasyrov	Salaspils	juggler, psychic	6	10	2	8
13	Maxim Tokayev and Maya Kolodina	Shchekino and Moscow	accordionist and singer	9	10	7	6
14	Albert Verkholyak and "Mad heels"	Vladimir	step	7	10	9	6
15	Sosnov boarding school for orphans and Olesya Pivova	Tambov region	dancers	7	10	9	9
16	Pyotr and Kirill Levins	Novosibirsk	stunts	6	10	8	5
17	Dmitry Bulkin and Irina Kazakova	Kubinka	equilibrists	9	10	9	10
18	Dmitry Bulkin	Kubinka	equilibrist	10	10	10	10

=== Season 3 (2008) ===
Finals

- 07.12.2008, Guest judge - Sergey Zhigunov.

№	Participant	City	Talent	Alexander Maslyakov	Tatyana Tolstaya	Sergey Zhigunov	Result
1	family of Borovikovs	Moscow	-	-	-	-	-
2	Nikolas Nigay	Nadym	-	-	-	-	-
3	Anna Tishchenko	Saratov	-	-	-	-	-
4	Sergei Levashov	Kineshma	-	-	-	-	-
5	collective "Anshlag"	Nizhny Tagil	-	-	-	-	-
6	ensemble "Talent"	Tashkent	-	-	-	-	-
7	Alexander Koblikov	Kyiv	-	-	-	-	favorite
8	Helen and Alexei Pivovs	Perm	-	-	-	-	-
9	Igor and Helen Berestovs	Bryansk	-	-	-	-	-
10	collective "E-Dance"	Yekaterinburg	-	-	-	-	-

- 14.12.2008, Guest judge - Zhanna Friske.

№	Participant	City	Talent	Alexander Maslyakov	Tatyana Tolstaya	Zhanna Friske	Result
1	Armen and Arsen Oveyans	Tyumen	-	-	-	-	favorites
2	Yury Kanagin	Moscow	-	-	-	-	-
3	collective "Shaytane"	Pervouralsk	-	-	-	-	-
4	"Parallels" studio	Lipetsk	-	-	-	-	-
5	Alexei Chaynikov	Shchelkovo	-	-	-	-	-
6	Dmitry Ponomaryov	Perm	-	-	-	-	-
7	Mergen Isyayev	Elista	-	-	-	-	-
8	Dilya Abdullayeva	Nizhny Novgorod	-	-	-	-	-
9	Ivan and Lisa Koroteyevs	Moscow	-	-	-	-	-
10	ensemble "The new wheel"	Moscow	-	-	-	-	-

- 21.12.2008, Guest judge - Filipp Kirkorov.

№	Participant	City	Talent	Alexander Maslyakov	Tatyana Tolstaya	Filipp Kirkorov	Result
1	Paul Masalkin and Valeria Shishukova	Perm	-	-	-	-	-
2	Olga Kalinina	Vologda	-	-	-	-	-
3	Ensemble "Ethnos"	Yuzhno-Sakhalinsk	-	-	-	-	-
4	Georgy Syrchin	Russkoye settlement	-	-	-	-	-
5	collective "Grace"	Perm	-	-	-	-	favorites
6	Daria Snegovskaya	Sergeyevka	-	-	-	-	-
7	Anna Makarova	Zhukovsky	-	-	-	-	-
8	ensemble "Ding-dong"	Tula	-	-	-	-	-
9	Ahmed Surkhatilov	Makhachkala	-	-	-	-	-

- 28.12.2008, Jurors were not present at the gala.

№	Participant	City	Talent	Filipp Kirkorov	Alena Vinnitskaya	Lev Leschenko	Sergey Zhigunov
1	Nikolas Nigay Nikolas Gnatyuk	Russia	singers	9	10	7	10
2	brothers Oveyans and Zara	Russia	singers	8	10	10	9
3	Anastasia Podzyum and group "Tea together"	Russia	singers	10	10	9	9
4	"Ikar" and Joseph Kobzon	Russia	singers	10	10	10	10
5	Grandmother Sima and Seryoga	Russia	singers	7	10	8	9
6	Olga Shubina's repair-shop and Anastasia Prokhodko	Russia	singers	8	10	8	10
7	"Giants' show" and Alexander Buynov	Russia	singers and stilts	7	10	8	8
8	family of Pivovs and the "Quatro" group	Russia	singers and skateboarders	8	10	8	9
9	Sergei Ferjulyan and the "Factory" group	Russia	singers and jugglers	9	10	9	8
10	collective "APL-show" and Khelga	Russia	fire-show and singer	8	10	9	9
11	collective "Grace" and the "In-Yan" group	Russia	acrobats and singers	9	10	8	8
12	collective "Ikar" and Jasmine	Russia	singers	9	10	9	9
13	Alexander Koblikov and Viktoria Dayneko	Russia	juggler and singer	8	10	7	10
14	collective "The yellow case" and the "BIS" group	Russia	singers	7	10	8	10
15	Alexander Yachmenyov and Tatyana Bulanova	Russia	singers	9	10	9	10
16	collective "Bravo" and Irina Allegrova	Russia	singers	10	10	10	10
17	Edith Piekha	Russia	singer	10	10	10	10

==== Russia's Got Talent. The best (22 acts of 1-3 seasons) (16.05.2009) ====
Top	Participant
22	Slava Svetlov (Novosibirsk)
21	Mark Vishnya (Novosibirsk)
20	Eugeny Korytchinkov (Ryazan)
19	Sergei and Svetlana Chuyko (Moscow)
18	Eugeny Kuznetsov (Dzerzhinsk)
17	Anastasia Sorokova (Podolsk)
16	Dmitry Bubin (Salaspils)
15	«Lemon-show» (Moscow)
14	Maya Kolodina (Moscow)
13	Timofei Zheludkov (Kyiv)
12	Garik (Saint Petersburg)
11	Oleg Khavronich (Moscow)
10	Artyom Shchukin (Saratov)
9	Nadezhda Yefimova (Krasnodar)
8	Mongush family (Kyzyl)
7	ensemble «Vzlyot» (Omsk)
6	Georgy Syrchin (Russkoye settlement)
5	Viktor Minasov (Moscow)
4	Daniil and Kirill Kalutskikh (Moscow)
3	Denis Prilipko (Yekaterinburg)
2	Nikolai Nigai (Nadym)
1	Dmitry Bulkin (Kubinka)

=== Season 4 (2009-2010) ===
Finals

- 06.03.2010, Guest judge - Larisa Guzeyeva.

№	Participant	City	Talent	Leonid Parfyonov	Alexander Maslyakov	Larisa Guzeyeva	Result
1	Tatyana Konobas	Yalta	juggler	-	-	-	-
2	Alexander and Sergei Grinchenko	Pervomaysk	acrobats	-	-	-	favorites
3	"Vostorg" collective	Pavlovgrad	dancers	-	-	-	-
4	Vitaly Chvanin	Monino	bike stunts	-	-	-	-
5	Dmitry Kuzenyatkin	Saint Petersburg	singer	-	-	-	-
6	Sergei Listopad	Letny Otdykh	magician	-	-	-	-
7	Alexander Kvarta	Kharkiv	singer	-	-	-	-
8	Polina Volchek	Moscow	acrobat	-	-	-	-
9	Otay Omurzakov	Karakol	robot	-	-	-	-
10	Ilya Svetlichny	Gora-Podol	drummer	-	-	-	-

- 26.03.2010, Guest judge - Valentina Tolkunova.

№	Participant	City	Talent	Leonid Parfyonov	Alexander Maslyakov	Valentina Tolkunova	Result
1	"Dance Magic Show" collective	Ashkelon	dancers	-	-	-	-
2	Natalya Shugayeva	Borispol	plastic	-	-	-	-
3	ensemble "LAD"	Novosibirsk	musicians	-	-	-	-
4	Sergei Ignatyev	Moscow	plastic	-	-	-	-
5	David Kalandiya	Riga	singer	-	-	-	favorite
6	Daria Abdukhasova and Dana Rysbekova	Astana	dancers	-	-	-	-
7	"Flying foots" collective	Luhansk	dancers	-	-	-	-
8	Vitaly Tatarinov	Moscow	singer	-	-	-	-
9	"Trampo brothers" collective	Kyiv	jumping on a trampoline	-	-	-	-
10	Maxim Maksimov	Riga	magic	-	-	-	-

- 16.04.2010, Guest judge - Lyudmila Maksakova.

№	Participant	City	Talent	Leonid Parfyonov	Alexander Maslyakov	Lyudmila Maksakova	Result
1	Ksenia Simonova	Yevpatoriya	sand drawings	-	-	-	-
2	veterans choir	Rostov-on-Don	choir	-	-	-	-
3	Oleg and Julia Pospelovs	Kyiv	aerialists	-	-	-	-
4	"Genchlik" collective	Crimea	drummers	-	-	-	-
5	Vitaly Shimansky and Oleg Klimenko	Rostov-on-Don	jugglers	-	-	-	favorites
6	"Mad sports" collective	Moscow	jugglers	-	-	-	-
7	Erki-Andres Nuut	Tallinn	playing unusual instruments	-	-	-	-
8	Albert Arslanov	Petropavlovsk-Kamchatsky	ball stunts	-	-	-	-
9	"White lotus" collective	Mariupol	martial arts	-	-	-	-
10	Valentin Lysenko	Vladimir-Volynsky	stunts	-	-	-	-

- 23.04.2010, Guest judge - Galina Volchek.

№	Participant	City	Talent	Leonid Parfyonov	Alexander Maslyakov	Galina Volchek	Result
1	"Artvan" collective	Giaginskaya	acrobats	-	-	-	-
2	Anastasia Kravchuk	Moscow	sand drawings	-	-	-	-
3	Sos Petrosyan	Moscow	magician	-	-	-	-
4	Irina Pitsur	Kyiv	hula hoop	-	-	-	-
5	Ivan Samovarov	Moscow	musician	-	-	-	-
6	Denis Nikitin	Moscow	bike stunts	-	-	-	-
7	duet "Step-accord"	Samara	musicians	-	-	-	-
8	Edvin Narsisyan	Moscow	singer	-	-	-	-
9	Dmitry Nadolinsky and Ruslan Gilmulin	Simferopol	dangerous stunts	-	-	-	favorites
10	Gagik Aydinyan	Sochi	double Michael Jackson	-	-	-	-

- 30.04.2010, International gala, Guest judges - Barbara Brylska and Pierre Richard.

№	Participant	City	Talent	Leonid Parfyonov	Alexander Maslyakov	Barbara Brylska	Pierre Richard	Result
1	Roman Rogalyov	Russia	balalaika	4	5	4	4	17
2	Emilien Tsankovsky	France	statue	4	4	3	4	16
3	Daniel Sylvester	United States	humour	4	4	4	4,5	16,5
4	"Cristal harmony"	Russia	playing music on glasses	5	5	5	5	20

- 14.05.2010, Rewards Gala, Guest judges - Barbara Brylska, Pierre Richard.

№	Participant	City	Talent	Leonid Parfyonov	Alexander Maslyakov	Barbara Brylska	Pierre Richard	Result
1	Beautiful Jules	Sweden	sword swallowers	4	4	5	5	18
2	brothers Kalutskikh	Russia	acrobats	5	5	5	5	20
3	Chris Chiliano	Germany	aerialist	4	4	5	5	18
4	Atay Omurzakov	Kyrgyzstan	dancer	5	5	5	5	20

=== Season 5 (2010-2011) ===
Finals

- 11.06.2011, Guest judge - Filipp Kirkorov.

№	Participant	City	Talent	Maria Shukshina	Alexander Maslyakov	Filipp Kirkorov	Result
1	Leonid Belyakov	Ivanovo	performance with animals	-	-	-	-
2	Lev Rozhuleya	Nizhny Novgorod	juggler	-	-	-	-
3	Yerkesh Khasen	Astana	singer	-	-	-	-
4	Oktay and Telman Novruzovs	Gyanja	acrobats	-	-	-	-
5	Yang Ge	Beijing	singer	-	-	-	-
6	Aron Kotlyar	Nataniya	original talent	-	-	-	-
7	Alexander Krasnopolsky and Anna Yastremskaya	Berdichev	gymnasts	-	-	-	-
8	Alexander Skichko	Cherkassy	parodist	-	-	-	-
9	Alexei Turchenko	Voronezh	gymnast	-	-	-	-

- 18.06.2011, Guest judge - Nadezhda Babkina.

№	Participant	City	Talent	Maria Shukshina	Alexander Maslyakov	Nadezhda Babkina	Result
1	theatre plastic hands "Hand made"	Saint Petersburg	plastic	-	-	-	-
2	Aydyn Israfilov	Moscow	juggler	-	-	-	-
3	Konstantin Naumov	Ufa	singer	-	-	-	-
4	Dmitry Vasilenko	Satka	magician	-	-	-	-
5	"Matryokha" group	Samara	singers	-	-	-	-
6	Alexey Kichikov	Vityazevo	musician	-	-	-	-
7	Vladimir Nedyalko	Kaluga	stunts	-	-	-	-
8	Alexander Novak	Kyiv	juggler	-	-	-	-
9	Denis Chertovsky	Moscow	juggler	-	-	-	-

- 25.06.2011, Guest judge - Zurab Sotkilava.

№	Participant	City	Talent	Maria Shukshina	Alexander Maslyakov	Zurab Sotkilava	Result
1	Andranik Aleksanyan	Khmelnitsky	singer	-	-	-	-
2	Stanislav Obertayev	Elektrostal	original talent	-	-	-	-
3	Tatyana Artamonova	Moscow	portrayal	-	-	-	-
4	Alexander Bozhik	Lviv	musician	-	-	-	-
5	Vasily Trifonov	Krasnoyarsk	singer	-	-	-	-
6	Eugenia Orekhova, Nikita Nagornov, Stanislav Plotnikov	Minsk	acrobats	-	-	-	-
7	Viktor Kochkin and Daniel Anastasyin	Nizhny Novgorod	breakdancers	-	-	-	-
8	Andrei Makovoz	Pervomaysk	acrobat	-	-	-	-
9	Santekhnik's jazz	Nizhny Novgorod	musicians	-	-	-	-

- 02.07.2011, Guest judge - Vladimir Vinokur.

№	Participant	City	Talent	Maria Shukshina	Alexander Maslyakov	Vladimir Vinokur	Result
1	"Nutcracker" collective	Moscow	dancers	-	-	-	favorites
2	Alexander Barmin and Andrei Sapkevich	Saint Petersburg	singers	-	-	-	-
3	duet "Tempo rouge"	Kyiv	aerialists	-	-	-	-
4	"Карлос & Пиндос" group	Kyiv	singers	-	-	-	-
5	Alisa Solovyova and Roman Petukhov	Saint Petersburg, Ivanovo	dancers	-	-	-	-
6	Alexander Ostanin	Odesa	step	-	-	-	favorite
7	Paul Sklyarov	Kyiv	singer	-	-	-	-
8	Tatyana Balakhnina	Luhansk	plastic	-	-	-	-
9	Zakhar Demidov	Mytishchi	dancers	-	-	-	-
10	Duo flash	Kyiv	step	-	-	-	favorites

- 09.07.2011, International, Guest judges - Sergei Garmash, Marina Neyolova, Irina Rodnina and Emir Kusturitsa.

№	Participant	City	Talent	Sergei Garmash	Marina Neyolova	Irina Rodnina	Emir Kusturitsa	Result
1	Johan Wellton	Sweden		9	9	8	8	34
2	Damon Scott	Great Britain		9	10	10	9	38
3	Joche Schell Kreisel	Germany		9	10	10	9	38
4	Skating Duo Aratas	United States		7	8	9	8	32

- 16.07.2011, Rewards, Guest judges - Sergei Garmash, Marina Neyolova, Irina Rodnina and Emir Kusturitsa.

№	Participant	City	Talent	Sergei Garmash	Marina Neyolova	Irina Rodnina	Emir Kusturitsa	Result
5	Leonid Belyakov	Ivanovo		9	9	9	9	36
6	Yang Ge	Beijing	singer	10	10	10	10	40
7	Dickson Oppong	France	water stunts	9	9	9	9	36
8	"African's boys"	South Africa	dancers	9	10	10	9	38

==== Russia's Got Talent. The Best (24 acts of season 6) (13 November 2011) ====
Top	Participant	Talant
24	Sergei Zaranik, Minsk	traffic cop
23	Diana Kozakevich, Dnipropetrovsk	verses
22	Andrei Katkov, Berlin	dancer-equilibrist
21	«IBAND» band, Kazan	play on iPhone
20	Ilya Polyakov, Saint Petersburg	jumping-rope
19	Michael Corbonaro, United States	performance with the foam
18	Girls Community, Moscow	dancers
17	Anastasia Kazakova, Krasnogorsk	musician
16	Alexander Kenig, Sumy	singer
15	Rigolo, United States	Magic reeds with coconut
14	Yury Gorobets, Khmelnytskyi	singer
13	Amik Keningshtein, Israel	juggler
12	Vasily Koval, Odesa	horse
11	Olga Sivakova, Feodosia	singer
10	Pavel Domansky, Mykolaiv	dancer
9	«Maden Show» duet, Vinnytsia	visual arts
8	Igor Butorin, Kemerovo	hula hoops
7	Denis Lavrin, Moscow	singer
6	Ionela Tserush and Mikhai Unguryanu, Chișinău	dancers
5	Larisa Larina, Sevastopol	dancer
4	Vitaly Ostroverkhov, Odesa	walking on a wire
3	Pavel Boyarinov, Switzerland	tricks with the small elephant
2	«4th reaktor» band, Moscow and Kharkiv	musicians
1	Alexander Anikeyev, Donetsk	singer

==== Russia's Got Talent. The best (20.11.2011) ====
Nomination	Top	Participant (nominant)	Talent
Voice of reason	5	Nadezhda Dosmagambetova, Balakovo	singer
	5	«Just name» band, Volgograd	dancers
	4	Roman Rogalyov, Novosibirsk	balalaika player
	3	Irina Gurina, Moscow	singer
	3	Valeriya Markova, Moscow	juggler
	2	Maksim Cruel Addict Doshi, Odesa	interpreter of songs on the go
	1	Kristina Antonova, Moscow	singer
Rightabout face	5	Viktor Breda, Yushkovo settlement	singer
	4	Georgy Syrchin, Russkoye settlement	dancer
	3	«Otava Yo» band, Saint Petersburg	musicians
	2	«3 sisters», Ivanovo	singers
	1	Mikhail Nekrasov, Ruza	in the top
The voice of Fame	5	Pavel Sklyarov, Kyiv	singer
	4	Konstantin Naumov, Ufa	singer
	3	«Shpilyasti» band, Ukraine	play on bandura
	3	Igor Matviyenko with the song «You Bring me a river»	singer
	2	Yang Ge, Beijing	singer
	1	Valentina Tolkunova	singer
Choosing a heart	3	Leonid Belyakov and dog Chakha, Ivanovo	act with the dog
	2	Ivona, Kyiv	singer
	1	Andranik Aleksanyan, Khmelnitsky	singer

==== Russia's Got Talent. The best (acts for seasons 1-6) (27.11.2011) ====
Nomination	Season	Participant	Talent
finalist (the mass of fascination)	1	Denis Prilipko, Yekaterinburg	ballet («pink begemotik»)
finalist	1	Kalutskikh brothers, Moscow	acrobats
	1	Mongush family, Kyzyl	singers
	2	Oksana Lepskaya, Riga	singer
	2	Oleg Khavronich, Moscow	act with the snakes
	3	Alexander Koblikov, Kyiv	juggler
	3	Voktor Minasov, Moscow	act with the ball
	4	Ilya Svetlichny (3 years-old), Gora Podol	drummer
	4	Maksim Maksimov, Riga	magic with spoons and forks
	4	Vitaly Chvanin, Monino	bicycle show
finalist (prince of humor)	5	Alexander Skichko, Cherkassy	parodist
finalist	5	Eugenia Orekhova, Nikita Nagornov, Stanislav Plotnikov, Minsk	aeralists
	5	Alexander Ostanin, Odesa	step
Winner	1	Maksim Tokayev, Shchekino	accordionist
	2	Dmitry Bulkin, Kubinka	aeralist
	3	«Gratsiya» band, Perm	hymnasts
	4	Alexander and Sergei Grinchenko, Pervomaysk	acrobats
	5	Daniil Kochkin and Viktor Anastasyin, Nizhny Lomov	breakdancers

=== Season 6 (2011–2012) ===
Semifinals

- 15.04.2012, Guest judges - Mikhail Boyarsky and Svetlana Zhiltsova.

№	Participant	City	Genre	Larisa Guzeyeva	Alexander Maslyakov	Mikhail Boyarsky	Svetlana Zhiltsova	Result	
1	Igor Butorin	Kemerovo	hula hoops	10	10	9	10	39	
2	Yury Mamchich	Poltava	equilibrist	10	9	9	9	38	
3	Olga Sivakova	Feodosia	singer	8	8	8	9	33	-
4	Anastasia Kazakova	Krasnogorsk	singer	10	7	9	10	36	
5	Olga Sivakova and Vladimir Presnyakov	-	singers	10	9	8	9	36	
6	"Duo Freedom"	Odesa	acrobatists	9	7	7	10	33	
7	"Crazy Flight"	Kryvyi Rih	equilibrists	9	7	8	9	33	

- 06.05.2012, Guest judges - Pavel Astakhov and Vitaly Klichko

№	Participant	City	Talent	Vitaly Klichko	Larisa Guzeeva	Pavel Astakhov	Alexander Maslyakov	Result
1	Shadow's theatre "Fireflies"	Chernihiv	shadows	9	10	9	10	38
2	"Shpilyasti" group	Ukraine	musicians	9	10	9	10	38
3	Andrei Katkov	Berlin	acrobatist	8	10	10	9	37
4	Alexander Yermakov	Kyiv	acrobatist	8	9	9	10	36
5	Oleg Krikun	Rostov-on-Don	singer	10	9	9	8	36
6	Suzanna Selem	Kyiv	singer	9	10	10	8	36

- 27.05.2012, Guest judges — Igor Zhizhikin, Svetlana Druzhinina, Anastasia Zavorotnyuk, Yegor Druzhinin

№	Participant	City	Talent	Svetlana Druzhinina	Anastasia Zavorotnyuk	Igor Zhizhikin	Yegor Druzhinin	Result
1	Alexander Char	Moscow	magician	10	10	10	8	38
2	Mikhail Vasilyev	Cheboksary	magniteman	10	10	8	9	37
3	"IBand" and Larissa Dolina	-	singers	10	10	9	8	37
4	Ionela Tserush and Mikhai Unguryanu	Chișinău	dancers	10	10	9	10	39
5	Diana Kozakevich	Dnipropetrovsk	verses	10	10	8	8	36
6	Oleg Krikun and Tamara Gverdtsiteli	-	singers	10	10	9	7	36
7	Alexander Kenig	Sumy	singer	10	10	7	9	36
8	Yury Pikula	Krasnodar	singer	10	10	9	9	38

Finals

- 03.06.2012 (international, part 1), Guest judges — Gennady Khazanov, Ville Haapasalo, Carmen Rust, Sergei Makovetsky

№	Participant	Country	Talent	Gennady Khazanov	Ville Haapasalo	Carmen Rust	Sergei Makovetsky	Result
1	Busty Heart	Czech Republic	Breaking things-feeding	10	8	10	7	35
2	Yury Pikula and Olga Aroseva	-	singers	10	10	10	10	40
3	Professor Splash	Great Britain	jumping from a height of 7.3 m	10	9	8	10	37
4	Marina Golub, Vyacheslav Manucharov, "Shpilyasti" band	-	musicians	10	10	10	10	40
5	Kai Lecrerc	Germany	walking upside down	10	9	8	9	36
6	Artyom Ivanov, Yelena Kuletskaya, Andrei Katkov	-	acrobatists	10	10	10	10	40
7	Liu Wei	China	pianist	10	10	10	10	40

- 17.06.2012 (international, part 2) Guest judges - Gennady Khazanov, Ville Haapasalo, Carmen Rust, Sergei Makovetsky

№	Participant	Country	Talent	Gennady Khazanov	Ville Haapasalo	Carmen Rust	Sergei Makovetsky	Result
1	Big Mouth	Philippines	zoowoman	8	8	6	6	28
2	Ionela Tserush, Mikhai Unguryanu, Julia Kovalchuk, Yegor Druzhinin	-	dancers	10	10	10	10	40
3	Gighting Gravity	United States	dancers	9	7	6	8	30
4	Susanna and Gennady Khazanov	-	singers	10	10	10	10	40
5	Daniil Anastasyin and Viktor Kochkin	Russia	breakdance	10	10	10	10	40
6	Igor Butman	-	saxophonist	10	10	10	10	40
7	Dmitry Malikov, Dmitry Shepelev and quartet "Crazy Flight"	-	acrobatists	10	10	10	10	10
8	Igor Butorin	-	hula hoops	10	10	10	10	40(победитель)

==== Russia's Got Talent. The best of 6 season (01.07.2012) ====
Nomination	Top	Participant
Voltage	3	Dmitry Petrov, Kyiv
	2	Ivona, Kyiv
	1	Talgat Aripov, Chimkent
Happiness	3	Vladimir Anikeyev, Donetsk
	2	Diana Kozakevich, Kyiv
	1	Oleg Krikun and Tamara Gverdtsiteli
Pain	3	Busty Heart, Czech Republic
	2	Irina Nikulina, Nizhny Novgorod
	1	Pavel Boyarinov, Moscow
Surprise	3	Alekseyevs family, Saint Petersburg
	2	Yury Pikula, Krasnodar
	1	"Crazy Flight", Dmitry Shepelev, Dmitry Malikov
Shame	3	Leonid Magnificent, New York
	2	"4th reactor", Moscow and Kharkiv
	1	Karina "Barbie" Sharobokova, Moscow
Pride	3	Ionela Tserush and Mikhai Unguryanu, Chișinău
	2	"Almost seriously" trio, Ryazan
	1	Alexander Oleshko

=== Season 7 (2012–2013) ===
Semifinals

- 15.12.2012, Guest judges - Ingeborga Dapkūnaitė.

Nomination	Participant	City	Genre	Larisa Guzeyeva	Alexander Maslyakov	Sergei Yursky	Ingeborga Dapkūnaitė	Result
Skill	"I Team"	Rostov-on-Don	jumping on a trampoline	9	9	9	9	finalists
	"Awakened snakes" collective	Ulan-Ude	equilibrists	9	9	8	9	-
Voice	Olit Tevlyanaut	Anadyr	throat singing	9	9	9	9	finalist
	Sergei Rybachyov and dog Dick	Novovoronezh	the singing dog	9	8	8	9	-
Courage	Sergei Novikov	Kyiv	aeralist	9	8	8	9	-
	duet "Gold art"	Odesa	acrobats	9	8	8	9	-
Teamwork	"Mimikriya" theatre	Tyumen	theatre	9	9	9	9	finalists
	"Children of the Corn" collective	Moscow	dancers	9	9	8	9	-

- 22.12.2012, Guest judges - Dmitry Nagiyev.

Nomination	Participant	City	Genre	Larisa Guzeyeva	Alexander Maslyakov	Sergei Yursky	Dmitry Nagiyev	Result
Power	"Triglav" collective	Kamianets-Podilskyi	dangerous tricks	8	8	8	8	-
	"Traktorshow"	Cheboksary	performance of tractors	8	8	8	8	-
Power of sound	Aram Avedikyan	Sukhumi	duduk player	9	8	8	8	-
	"Drum Time" group	Saint Petersburg	drummers	9	8	9	8	-
Skill	Maksim Popazov	Moscow	equilibrist	9	9	9	9	finalist
	Oleksandr Yenivatov	Montmirail	frogman	9	8	8	9	-

Finals

- 06.01.2013, Guest judges - Yury Kuklachyov.

№	Participant	City	Genre	Larisa Guzeyeva	Alexander Maslyakov	Sergei Yursky	Yury Kuklachyov	Score	Result
1	Sampion Buglione	France	juggler-stepist	10	7	8	10	35	-
2	Maksim Popazov	Moscow	equilibrist	10	10	10	10	40	32.7% (top 2)
3	Rajesh Ambrali	India	pole dance	10	9	8	10	37	-
4	"Mimikriya" theatre	Tyumen	theatre	10	9	9	10	38	13.4% (top 4)
5	Dergin Tokmak	Germany	breakdancing on the crutches	10	10	9	10	39	-
6	Olit Tevlyanaut	Anadyr	throat singing	10	10	10	10	40	18.5% (top 3)
7	"Shaolin monks" collective	China	Kung Fu	10	7	8	10	35	-
8	"I_Team" group	Rostov-on-Don	jumping on a trampoline	10	10	10	10	40	35.4% (winners)

==== Russia's Got Talent. Gold pages (part 1) (12.01.2013) ====
This special series was commented by Alexander Oleshko and Anna Shatilova

Nomination	Top	Winner of nomination
-	-	"I_Team" group (Rostov-on-Don)
The falling star	20	Georgy Syrchin (Russkoye settlement)
Soul's mirror	19	Oleg Usov (Minsk)
The most untwisted	18	Oleksandr Yenivatov (Montmirail)
The smallest	17	Ilya Svetlichny (Gora-Podol)
The most fast-speaking	16	Psoy Korolenko (Moscow)
Puppeteers	15	"Mimikriya" theatre (Tyumen)
The spaciousest	14	Dickson Oppong (France)
The imperturbablest	13	Leonid Belyakov and dog Chakha (Ivanovo)
A risk kings	12	"Shar smelosti" (Ivanovo)
The most positive	11	Raisa Larina ("Granny Raya") (Sevastopol)
The puzzlingest	10	Maksim Chechnyov (Volgograd)
Start in life	9	Alexander Yermakov (Moscow)
The most shocking	8	Mikhail Nekrasov (Ruza)
The most charming	7	Busty Heart (Czech Republic)
The voice of nature	6	Gennady Tkachenko-Papizh (Saint Petersburg)
The one	5	"Crazy Flight" (Krivoy Rog)
The tradition's keepers	4	Mongush family (Kyzyl)
The most vociferous	3	Olga Aroseva and Yury Pikula (Krasnodar)
The most gracious	2	"Traktor show" (Cheboksary)
The final accord	1	girl's story from Limpopovsk city

==== Russia's Got Talent. Gold pages (part 2) (19.01.2013) ====
This series was commented by Alexander Oleshko and Larisa Guzeyeva.

Nomination	Top	Winner of nomination
Year's event	3	Igor Butorin (Moscow)
	2	Sergei Yursky
	1	Alexander Maslyakov's birthday
Year's scandal	3	Andrei Chekanyuk (Kyiv)
	2	Olga Vlasova (Yeysk)
	1	"A&A" duet (Sochi)
Year's present	3	Angelina Vovk's present from "Buranovskiye Babushki"
	2	Aram Avedikyan (Sukhumi)
	1	Anastasia Sukhoverkova (Tomsk)
The tears of happiness	3	Maxim Popazov (Moscow)
	2	"Awakened snakes" collective (Ulan-Ude)
	1	Olit Tevlyanaut (Anadyr)
Private showing	3	Nikolai Peregudov (Moscow)
	2	David Kartvelishvili (Sochi)
	1	Ambartsumyan brothers (Moscow)
Path to glory	3	"Triglav" collective (Kamianets-Podilskyi)
	2	"M&L" duet (Likino-Dulyovo)
	1	"I_Team" group (Rostov-on-Don)
Old man brigands	3	Vasily Pushin (Izhevsk)
	2	Sakinat Khanapiyeva (Kizilyurt)
	1	Lev Proskuryakov (Perm)

=== Season 8 (2013-2014) ===
Semifinals

- 14.12.2013, Guest judges — Gennady Khazanov, Alexander Schirwindt.

№	Participant	City	Genre	Larissa Guzeyeva	Alexander Maslyakov	Gennady Khazanov	Alexander Schirwindt	Result
1	Vakhtang Kalandadze	Moscow	beatbox	9	9	9	9	finalist
2	Boleslav Goncharuk	Omsk	rapper	9	8	8	8	-
3	The shadows theater «Teulis»	Kyiv	theater	9	9	9	9	finalists
4	Studio Theater "Relax"	Khanty-Mansiysk	theater	9	9	7	9	-
5	acrobatic trio «Russia Team»	Krasnodar	acrobats	10	9	8	7	-
6	"Terra Incognita"	Kyiv	theater	10	9	6	7	-
7	Olga Trifonova	Saint Petersburg	aeralist	9	8	7	9	finalist

- 28.12.2013, Guest judges — Irina Viner, Laima Vaikule.

№	Participant	City	Genre	Larissa Guzeyeva	Alexander Maslyakov	Irina Viner	Laima Vaikule	Result
1	"Zoya and Valera" duet	Brest	musicians	10	9	10	10	finalists
2	"Marusya" Folk group	Krasnodar	Russian people songs	10	9	10	10	finalists
3	Alexei Bus'ko and Anastasiya Kharchenko	Kyiv	theater	10	9	10	10	finalists
4	Vyacheslav Avramoglo	Tiraspol	dancer	9	8	9	10	-

- 11.01.2014, Guest judges — Lyudmila Maksakova, Dmitri Sautin.

№	Participant	City	Genre	Larissa Guzeyeva	Alexander Maslyakov	Lyudmila Maksakova	Dmitri Sautin	Result
1	Alexander Magala	Saint Petersburg	swords swallower	10	8	10	9	finalist
2	Nikita Izmaylov	Moscow	juggler	10	9	10	9	finalist
3	Emili Moskalenko	Poltava	gymnastics	10	6	10	7	-
4	Lyonya Shilovsky	Novosibirsk	drummer	10	9	10	9	finalist
5	Yura Kim	Yeysk	singer	10	7	10	6	-

- 18.01.2014 (additional), Guest judges - Larisa Golubkina, Efim Shifrin

№	Participant	City	Genre	Larisa Guzeyeva	Alexander Maslyakov	Larisa Golubkina	Efim Shifrin	Result
1	Artyom and Yevgeny Kibenko	Kursk	acrobats	10	9	10	9	finalists
2	Dmitry Politov	Michurinsk	aeralist	9	7	9	6	-
3	Hưng Nguyễn Văn	Vinh	singer	8	7	9	6	-
4	"Orietarhythm" trio (Katsumi Sakakura)	Tokyo	martial arts	9	7	9	7	-
5	Alexei Khilya	Moscow	aeralist	9	6	9	7	-
6	Oleg Valko	Kyiv	aeralist	9	6	9	6	-
7	Andreas Vessels	Berlin	juggler	9	7	9	8	-

Finals

- 25.01.2014, Guest judges - Marina Neyolova, Yelena Isinbayeva.

№	Participant	City	Genre	Larissa Guzeyeva	Alexander Maslyakov	Marina Neyolova	Yelena Isinbayeva	Result
1	Olga Trifonova	Saint Petersburg	aeralist	10	10	10	10	winner (35.82%)
2	Lyonya Shilovsky	Novosibirsk	drummer	8	7	8	9	-
3	Vakhtang Kalandadze	Tbilisi	beatbox	9	7	9	9	
4	"Zoya and Valera" duet	Brest	singers	9	8	9	9	-
5	Volk-group "Marusya"	Krasnodar	Russian people songs	9	8	9	9	-

- 01.02.2014, Guest judges - Marina Neyolova, Yelena Isinbayeva.

№	Participant	City	Genre	Larissa Guzeyeva	Alexander Maslyakov	Marina Neyolova	Yelena Isinbayeva	Result
1	Alexei Bus'ko and Anastasiya Kharchenko	Kyiv	acrobats	8	7	8	8	-
2	Alexander Magala	Saint Petersburg	swords swallower	10	10	10	10	winner
3	"Teulis" shadow theater	Kyiv	theater	9	7	9	9	-
4	Artyom and Eugeny Kibenko	Kursk	acrobats	8	6	8	8	-
5	Nikita Izmaylov	Moscow	juggler	10	10	10	10	winner

=== Season 9 (2017) ===
On September 21, 2016 Channel One announced the casting for the new anniversary season.

Semifinals

- 18.03.2017, Guest judges — Sergei Yursky, Sergei Svetlakov, Renata Litvinova, Vladimir Posner.

№	Participant	City	Genre	Svetlakov	Yursky	Litvinova	Posner	Result
1	Vlad Komissarov	Moscow	slacklining	yes	yes	yes	yes	finalist
2	«Circus of trained dogs»	Obninsk	ballet	yes	yes	yes	yes	-
3	Tina Mamonova	Berezniki	dance	yes	no	yes	no	finalist (rescued by the host)
4	Viktor Shishko	Mogilev	illusionist	yes	yes	yes	yes	finalist
5	«Yuvisens» duet	Shanghai	air gymnastics	yes	yes	yes	yes	-
6	Sonia Raine	Saint Petersburg	lyrics	no	yes	yes	yes	-
7	«Unknown» duet	Yekaterinburg	acrobatics	no	yes	yes	no	-
8	Alina Pisyach	Novosibirsk	air mesh participation	yes	yes	yes	yes	-

- 25.03.2017, Guest judges — Sergei Yursky, Sergei Svetlakov, Renata Litvinova, Vladimir Posner.

№	Participant	City	Genre	Svetlakov	Yursky	Litvinova	Posner	Result
1	Vladislava Yerofeyeva	Moscow	melange act	yes	yes	yes	yes	-
2	Yegor Churakov	Kirov	free-pylon equilibrium	no	yes	yes	no	-
3	Roman Halafyan	Moscow	magician	yes	yes	yes	yes	finalist
4	Gevorg and Andranik Vardanyan	Moscow	power acrobatics	yes	yes	yes	yes	finalists
5	Viktoriya and Anna Starikovs	Nizhny Tagil	singer	yes	yes	yes	yes	-
6	Yevgeny Vasilenko	Las Vegas	equilibrium on a free wire	yes	yes	yes	yes	finalist
7	Igor Smolnikov and Alena Semochkina	Tyumen	soap bubbles show	no	no	yes	no	-

- 01.04.2017, Guest judges — Sergei Yursky, Sergei Svetlakov, Renata Litvinova, Vladimir Posner.

№	Participant	City	Genre	Svetlakov	Yursky	Litvinova	Posner	Result
1	Anfisa Kurabtseva	Sergiyev Posad	appearance on air canvases	yes	yes	yes	yes	finalist
2	Grigory Bondarevsky and Nikita Izmaylov	Moscow	paired juggling	no	yes	no	no	-
3	Alexey Gigauri	Moscow	focus with iphone	yes	no	yes	yes	finalist
4	Kristina Denisova	Chapayevsk	free-chain acrobatics	yes	no	yes	no	-
5	Kirill Sverchkov	Penza	juggling diabolo	yes	no	yes	yes	finalist
6	«Resonance» duet	Las Vegas	equilibrium	yes	yes	yes	yes	-
7	Vladislav Kostyuchenko	Gomel	the football freestyle	no	no	no	no	-
8	Alexander Zagidullin	Kazan	dance on head	yes	no	yes	yes	-
9	Yuliya Reutova	Moscow	acrobatics	yes	yes	yes	no	-

- 08.04.2017, Guest judges — Sergei Yursky, Sergei Svetlakov, Renata Litvinova, Vladimir Posner.

№	Participant	City	Genre	Svetlakov	Yursky	Litvinova	Posner	Result
1	Dmitry Politov	Michurinsk	pylon	yes	yes	yes	yes	finalist
2	Ivan and Andrey Kucherenko	Odesa	trampolining	yes	no	yes	yes	-
3	Anastasiya Koreneva	Tyumen	aerial acrobatics on the ring and canvases	yes	no	yes	yes	-
4	Pavel Fadeyev	Minsk	dance in growth dolls	no	yes	no	no	-
5	«Udi»	Tomsk	dance-acrobatics	yes	yes	yes	yes	finalists
6	Oksana Demyanchuk	Petrozavodsk	Indian dance	no	no	no	no	-
7	Nikita Sadov	Verkhny Ufaley	participation on canvases	yes	yes	no	yes	-
8	Anastasiya Brezhneva	Stavropol	pylon	no	yes	yes	no	-

- 15.04.2017, Guest judges — Sergei Yursky, Sergei Svetlakov, Renata Litvinova, Vladimir Posner.

№	Participant	City	Genre	Svetlakov	Yursky	Litvinova	Posner	Result
1	«Spartak Crew»	Saint Petersburg	hip hop	yes	yes	yes	yes	-
2	Svetlana Tulasi	Moscow	Indian dance	yes	yes	yes	yes	-
3	Ilia Zinevich	Kaliningrad	flexing	yes	no	yes	yes	finalist
4	«Nas100burskikh»	(many cities)	dance	yes	no	yes	yes	-
5	«Plastilinovy Dozhd»	Samara	pantomime on stilts	no	no	yes	no	-
6	Yekaterina Lesovaya and Anastasiya Shapochkina	Krasnodar	song	yes	no	yes	no	-
7	Vavan and «Rayon»	Perm and Kirov	song	yes	no	no	no	-
8	MC Munstar	Saint Petersburg	rap improvisation	no	no	yes	no	-
9	«Kuular»	Kyzyl	Tuvan throat singing	yes	no	yes	no	-

Finals

- 22.04.2017, Guest judges — Sergei Yursky, Sergei Svetlakov, Renata Litvinova, Vladimir Posner.

№	Participant	City	Genre	Svetlakov	Yursky	Litvinova	Posner	Result (points)
1	Yevgeny Vasilenko	Las Vegas	free-wheel equilibrium	8	10	9	9	36
2	Viktor Shishko	Mogilev	illusion with displacement	8	8	10	7	33
3	Dmitry Politov	Michurinsk	pylon	0	0	0	0	0 (injury)
4	Alexey Gigauri and Roman Khalafyan	Moscow	magicians	9	8	10	10	37
5	Ilya Zinevich	Kaliningrad	flexing	6	6	8	5	25
6	Vardanyan brothers	Moscow	power pair	10	10	10	10	40
7	«Udi»	Tomsk	dance	10	10	10	8	38
8	Vladislav Komissarov	Moscow	slacklining	7	6	8	7	28
9	Kirill Sverchkov	Penza	juggling diabolo	8	7	9	7	31
10	Tina Mamonova	Berezniki	air acrobatics	5	5	4	3	17
11	Anfisa Kurabtseva	Sergiyev Posad	participate on air blinds with blindfolds	8	6	10	7	31

- 29.04.2017, Guest judges — Sergei Yursky, Sergei Svetlakov, Renata Litvinova, Vladimir Posner.

№	Participant	City	Genre	Yursky	Svetlakov	Litvinova	Posner	Result (points)
1	Yevgeny Vasilenko	Las Vegas	free-wheel equilibrium	9	10	10	10	39
2	Anfisa Kurabtseva	Sergiyev Posad	participate on air blinds with blindfolds	8	8	10	9	35
3	Alexey Gigauri and Roman Khalafyan	Moscow	magicians	10	8	10	10	38
7	«Udi»	Tomsk	dance	10	10	9	10	39
5	Vardanyan brothers	Moscow	power pair	9	10	10	10	39
6	Kirill Sverchkov	Penza	juggling diabolo	8	6	9	8	31
7	Viktor Shishko	Mogilev	illusion with displacement	8	10	10	9	37

== Winners ==
- Maxim Tokayev (accordionist), season 1
- Dmitry Bulkin (professional acrobat), season 2
- Team «Gratsiya» (plastic), season 3
- Aleksander and Sergey Grinchenko (acrobats), season 4
- Viktor Kochkin and Daniil Anastasyin (break dancers), season 5
- Igor Butorin (hula hoops), season 6
- «I_Team» group (jumping on a trampoline), season 7
- Olga Trifonova (air gymnast), season 8
- Vardanyan brothers (power acrobatics), season 9

== International Competition ==
1. On January 3, 2010 an international competition was held for the participants of the "Got Talent" shows from Israel, Russia, United States, France, Germany and Argentina. Foreign participants were assessed by Russian judges Alexander Maslyakov, Leonid Parfyonov and Vera Alentova and Russian participants were assessed by judges from the other nations, with scores were given out of 10.

Hosting the contest were singer Philip Kirkorov and actor Dmitry Nagiyev with co-hosts Alexander Oleshko and Ville Haapasalo, both actors.

Between the participants performances various Russian artists performed, including Philip Kirkorov, Lyudmila Gurchenko and Dima Bilan, Alexander Oleshko and Ekaterina Starshova, Sergey Lazarev and Lera Kudryavtseva, Dmitry Nagiyev, and VIA Gra.

The winner was a Russian participant - Gagik Aidinyan (double Michael Jackson).

2. July 9 and July 16, 2011 in the season 5 of the show "Minute of Fame" was hosted the international tournament in 2 parts, where the participants were from Russia, Sweden, United States, Germany, Great Britain, France, China and South Africa. Participants were evaluated by Sergei Garmash, Marina Neyolova, Irina Rodnina and Emir Kusturica. This contest was won by guests from South Africa, while gaining the most points - 40 points and taken the "2010-2011 Minutes of Fame" International Cup. This contest was hosted by Alexander Oleshko and Julia Kovalchuk.

3. September 4, 2011 in Russia was the opening of the season 6 of the project with a grand premiere of "Russia vs America", which had held Alexander Oleshko, Julia Kovalchuk, Valdis Pelsh and Yana Churikova. Referees rated using a 10-point scale: Russian participants were evaluated by the American jury, and Americans were evaluated by Russian jury: Alexander Tsekalo, Kristina Orbakaitė, Alexander Maslyakov and Carmen Rust. As a result, Alexander and Sergei Grinchenko (Russia) and Rigolo (America) have scored 40 points.

4. June 3 and June 17, 2012, an international competition held for the first time on two scenes in the form of 2 grand finals, where the finalists competed in 2011 from the Czech Republic, the UK, Germany, China, the United States, the Philippines and Russia. Russian Jury evaluated them on a 10-point scale. In the first final was won by participant Liu Wei from China, and in the second final was won by Victor Kochkin and Daniel Anastasin (Russia, winners of the season 5) which have scored 40 points.

This grand final was hosted by Dmitry Shepelev and Julia Vysotskaya.

== Reruns ==
- From July 6 to August 31, 2014, Season 8 reruns were aired.
- April 5, 2015 in the 20th anniversary of Channel One in «Channel One Collection», the Season One final was aired as the charts.

== Sources ==
1. The newspaper New Life. "Interview with Dmitry Bulkin"
2. "Wild meanness" Minute of Fame
3. "Falling of the Filip Kirkorov"
4. "The fall of the Minute of Fame. Participant dropped from a height of 5 meters"
5. "Member of the Minutes of Fame was almost killed in his speech"
6. "The participant Minutes of Fame was taken from the show on Ambulance"
7. Minute of Fame. "Olympic season"
