= Pervomaysky District =

Pervomaysky District may refer to:

- Pervomaysky District, Russia, several districts and city districts in Russia

== Alternative spelling ==
- Pyershamayski District (Pervomaysky District), a city district of Minsk, Belarus
- Birinchi May District, Bishkek (Pervomaysky District), a city district of Bishkek, Kyrgyzstan
- Pervomaiske Raion (Pervomaysky District), a district of the Autonomous Republic of Crimea, Ukraine
- Pervomaiskyi Raion, Kharkiv Oblast (Pervomaysky District), a former district of Kharkiv Oblast, Ukraine
- Pervomaisk Raion (Pervomaysky District), a district of Mykolaiv Oblast, Ukraine

== See also ==
- Pervomaysky (disambiguation)
