= Pervomaysky District, Russia =

Pervomaysky District is the name of several administrative and municipal divisions of Russia. The districts are generally named for International Workers' Day, which is celebrated on May 1.

== Districts of the federal subjects ==
Federal subjects of Russia which have an entity called Pervomaysky District

- Pervomaysky District, Altai Krai, an administrative and municipal district of Altai Krai
- Pervomaysky District, Orenburg Oblast, an administrative and municipal district of Orenburg Oblast
- Pervomaysky District, Tambov Oblast, an administrative and municipal district of Tambov Oblast
- Pervomaysky District, Tomsk Oblast, an administrative and municipal district of Tomsk Oblast
- Pervomaysky District, Yaroslavl Oblast, an administrative and municipal district of Yaroslavl Oblast
- Pervomaysky District, Republic of Crimea, a district in the Republic of Crimea, a territory disputed between Russia and Ukraine

== City divisions ==
- Pervomaysky City District, Izhevsk, a city district of Izhevsk, the capital of the Udmurt Republic
- Pervomaysky City District, Kirov, a city district of Kirov, the administrative center of Kirov Oblast
- Pervomaysky Administrative Okrug, an administrative okrug of the city of Murmansk, the administrative center of Murmansk Oblast
- Pervomaysky City District, Novosibirsk, a city district of Novosibirsk, the administrative center of Novosibirsk Oblast
- Pervomaysky City District, Penza, a city district of Penza, the administrative center of Penza Oblast
- Pervomaysky City District, Rostov-on-Don, a city district of Rostov-on-Don, the administrative center of Rostov Oblast
- Pervomaysky City District, Vladivostok, a city district of Vladivostok, the administrative center of Primorsky Krai
Cities in Russia with a city division called "Pervomaysky"

== Historical districts ==
- Pervomaysky District, Nizhny Novgorod Oblast, a former administrative and municipal district of Nizhny Novgorod Oblast; in terms of the administrative divisions transformed into a town of oblast significance, and in terms of the municipal divisions transformed into an urban okrug in July 2012

== See also ==
- Pervomaysky (disambiguation)
- Pervomaysky Okrug (disambiguation)
- Pervomaysk (disambiguation)
- Pervoye Maya (disambiguation)
