= Pervomaisk, Ukraine =

Pervomaisk (Ukrainian: Первома́йськ) is a popular toponym in Ukraine. It is a loan from Russian Pervomaysk, but it is more popular than its natively Ukrainian analogues.

== Populated places ==
Urban localities

- Pervomaisk, Luhansk Oblast (officially known as Sokolohirsk)
- Pervomaisk, Mykolaiv Oblast

Rural localities

- The former name of Stanytsia Tashlyk
- The former name of Popivka, Starobilsk Raion
- The former name of Travneve, Svatove Raion

== Administrative divisions ==
- Pervomaisk Raion, one of raions of Ukraine centered in Pervomaisk, Mykolaiv Oblast

== See also ==
- Pershotravensk
- Pershe Travnia
- Pershotravneve
- Pervomaiske
