= Pervomaysky =

Pervomaysky (masculine), Pervomayskaya (feminine), or Pervomayskoye (neuter) is a Russian language toponym that commemorates the International Labor Day holiday (First of May) and may refer to:

== Former Soviet Union ==
- Pervomaysky District (disambiguation), several districts in the countries of the former Soviet Union

== Azerbaijan ==
- Pervomaysky, former name of Birinci Mayak
- Pervomayskoye, alternative name of Bəhramtəpə, a village

== Belarus ==
- Pyershamayskaya (Minsk Metro) (in Belarusian, Pyershamayskaya), a station in Minsk Metro

== Kazakhstan ==
- Pervomayskiy, Kazakhstan, a village in the Almaty Province

== Kyrgyzstan ==
- Pervomayskoye, Panfilov, a village in the Panfilov District, Chuy Province
- Birinchi May District, district of Bishkek, called "Pervomaysky" in Russian

== Russia ==
- Pervomaysky, Maykopsky District
- Pervomaysky Okrug (disambiguation), name of various divisions
- Pervomaysky Urban Settlement (or Pervomayskoye Urban Settlement), several municipal urban settlements
- Pervomaysky, Russia (Pervomayskaya, Pervomayskoye), several inhabited localities
- Pervomayskaya (Moscow Metro), a station of the Moscow Metro, Moscow
- Pervomayskaya (closed) (1954–1961), a former station of the Moscow Metro, Moscow
- Pervomayskaya (Ufa Metro), a station in Ufa Metro, which has not yet been completed

== Ukraine ==
The Ukrainian variant of the name is Pervomaiskyi (Ukrainian: Первомайський). Locations with the name include:

- Pervomaiskyi, Donetsk Oblast
- The former name of Zlatopil, Kharkiv Oblast
- Kozachyi Island, island in the Dnieper-Bug Estuary, formerly known as Pervomaiskyi Island

== See also ==
- Pervomaysk (disambiguation)
- Pervomaiske (disambiguation)
- Pervomaisc (disambiguation)
- Pervomaiscoe (disambiguation)
- Pervoye Maya (disambiguation)
- Prvomajska
