= Pervomaiske =

Pervomaiske (Ukrainian: Первомайське) is a Ukrainian toponym. Places with the name include:

- Pervomaiske, Crimea
- Pervomaiske, Horlivka Raion, Donetsk Oblast
- Pervomaiske, Mykolaiv Oblast
- The former name of Avdiivske
- The former name of Bolharka, Rozdilna Raion, Odesa Oblast

The toponym literally means "the first of May", in reference to the International Workers' Day holiday that takes place on that date. It shares the same etymology with the toponyms Pershotravenka, Pershotravensk, Pershotravneve, and Pershe Travnia, among others. Due to the law "On the Condemnation and Prohibition of Propaganda of Russian Imperial Policy in Ukraine and the Decolonization of Toponymy", signed in April 2023 by Ukrainian president Volodymyr Zelenskyy, all localities in Ukraine with the name "Pervomaiske" or other May Day-related toponyms were set to be renamed. The Ukrainian Institute of National Memory has described toponyms related to May Day as "a clear example of massive Soviet ideological toponymic nomination aimed at glorifying the proletariat as the hegemon of the class struggle, the driving force of the October Revolution of 1917 and the future 'world revolution.'" The majority of such settlements were renamed in September 2024.

== See also ==
- Pervomaiske Raion, a former raion of the Autonomous Republic of Crimea
- Pervomaysk (disambiguation)
- Pervomaysky (disambiguation)
