= Pyervamaysk =

Pyervamaysk (Belarusian: Первамайск, Russian: Первомайск) may also refer to the following localities in Belarus:

- Pyervamaysk, Dokshytsy district, Vitebsk region
- Pyervamaysk, Lyelchytsy district, Gomel region
- Pyervamaysk, Loyew district, Gomel region
- Pyervamaysk, Drybin district, Mogilev region
- Pyervamaysk, Usda district, Minsk region

== See also ==
- Pyershamaysk (populated place)
- Pervomaysk (disambiguation)
