= Zudilovo =

Zudilovo Зудилово
- Rural locality
- Interactive map of Zudilovo
- Location of Zudilovo Zudilovo (Altai Krai)
- Coordinates: 53°29′8″N 83°53′8″E
- Country: Russia
- Federal subject: Altai Krai
- Administrative district: Pervomaysky District
- Selsoviet: Zudilovskiy
- Founded: 1734

Population (2010 Census)
  - Total: 4,025
  - Estimate (2021): 5,155 (+28.1%)
- Time zone: UTC+7 (MSK+4)
- Postal code: 658042
- Dialing code: +7 38532
- OKTMO ID: 01632434101

Zudilovo (Russian: Зуди́лово) is a selo in Pervomaysky District of Altai Krai, Russia.

It is an administrative center of Municipal division Zudilovski Selsoviet.

Among local people the selo is divided into Old-Zudilovo and New-Zudilovo, with the border being the railway.

== Geography ==
The selo is located in 33 km from the city of Barnaul.

The climate is continental with cold winters and warm summers.

In the natural landscapes valleys and forests, both mixed coniferous and softwood prevail. The main species of trees: Pinus sylvestris, Betula, Populus tremula and other broad-leaved trees. Shrubs: Sorbus and Padus.

The Big Cheremshanka River flows over the territory of the selo.

== Transportation ==
The closest cities: Novoaltaysk — 7 km, Barnaul — 33 km, Biysk — 159 km, Novosibirsk — 205 km.

Two railways traverse the selo, connecting West and East of Russia, and also R256 highway runs through the locality.

The selo is directly reachable from Novoaltaysk by bus and from Barnaul by bus and EMU.

== Economy ==
Apart from the «Sosnoviy Bor» sanatorium, the "Orlenok" summer camp, a skiing center, and several grocery stores, there are no enterprises, therefore residents mainly work in the cities around.

== Gallery ==
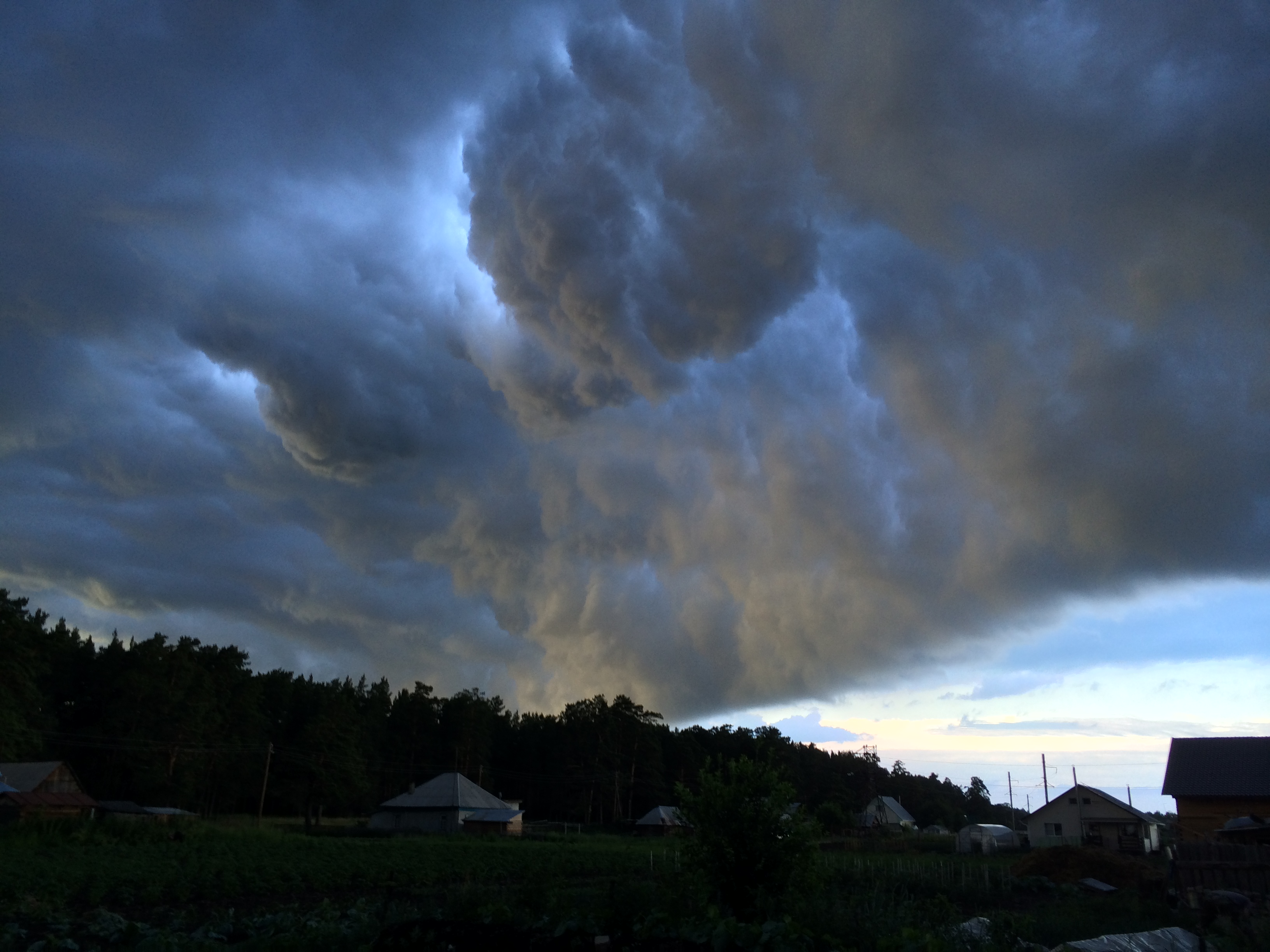
Storm in Zudilovo, Altai Krai

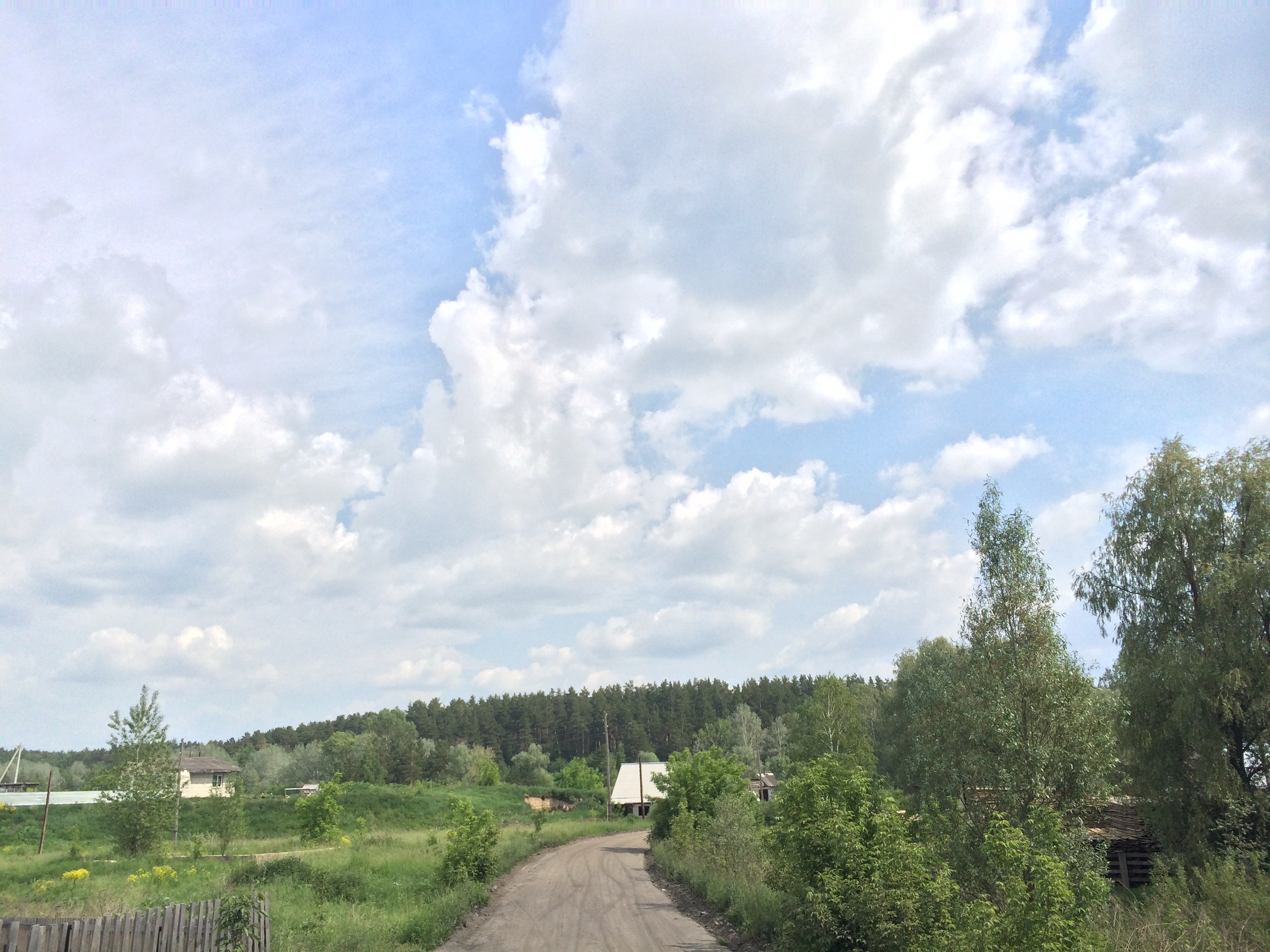
Summer in Zudilovo, Altai Krai

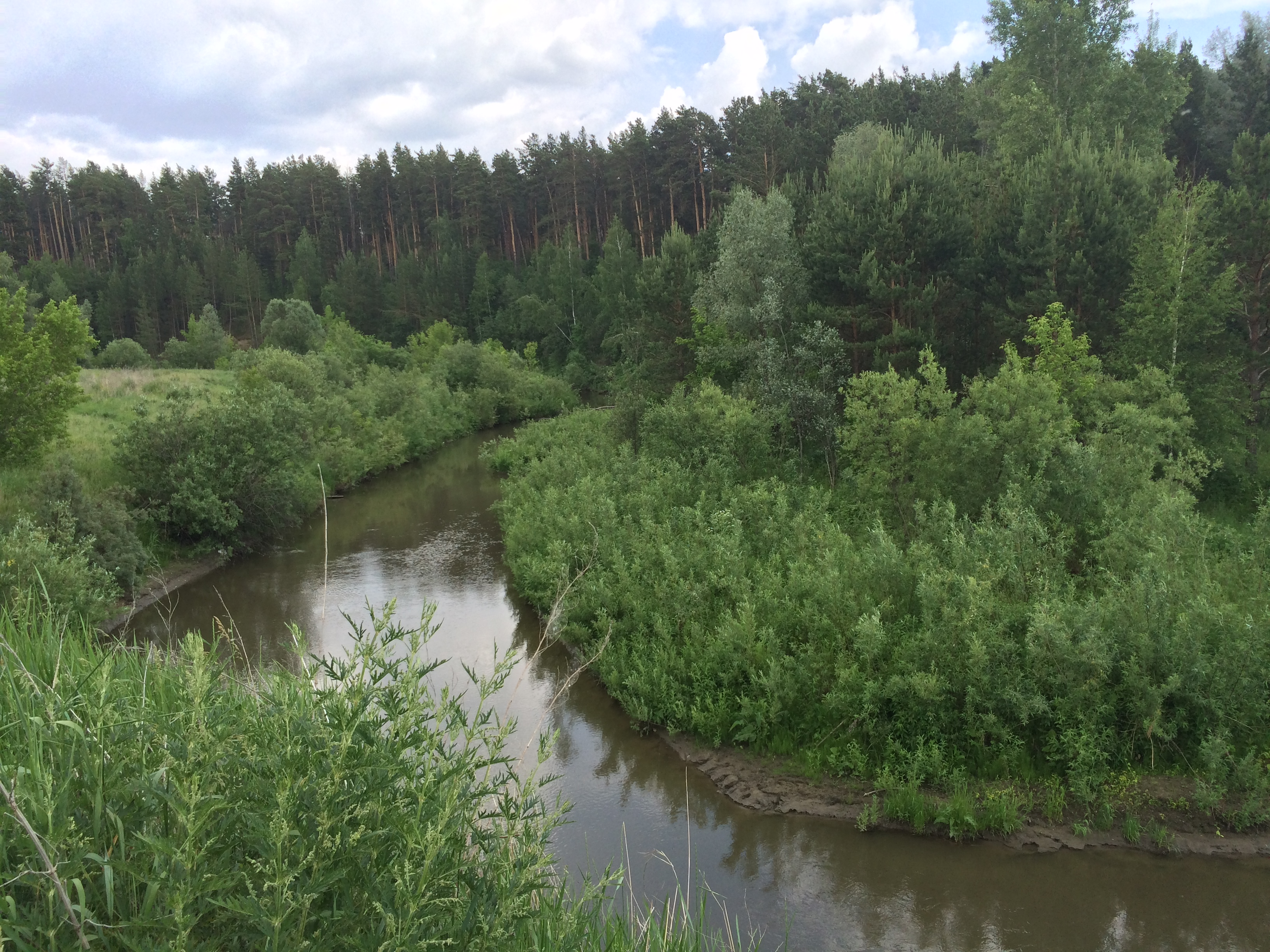
Big Cheremshanka River in Zudilovo, Altai Krai

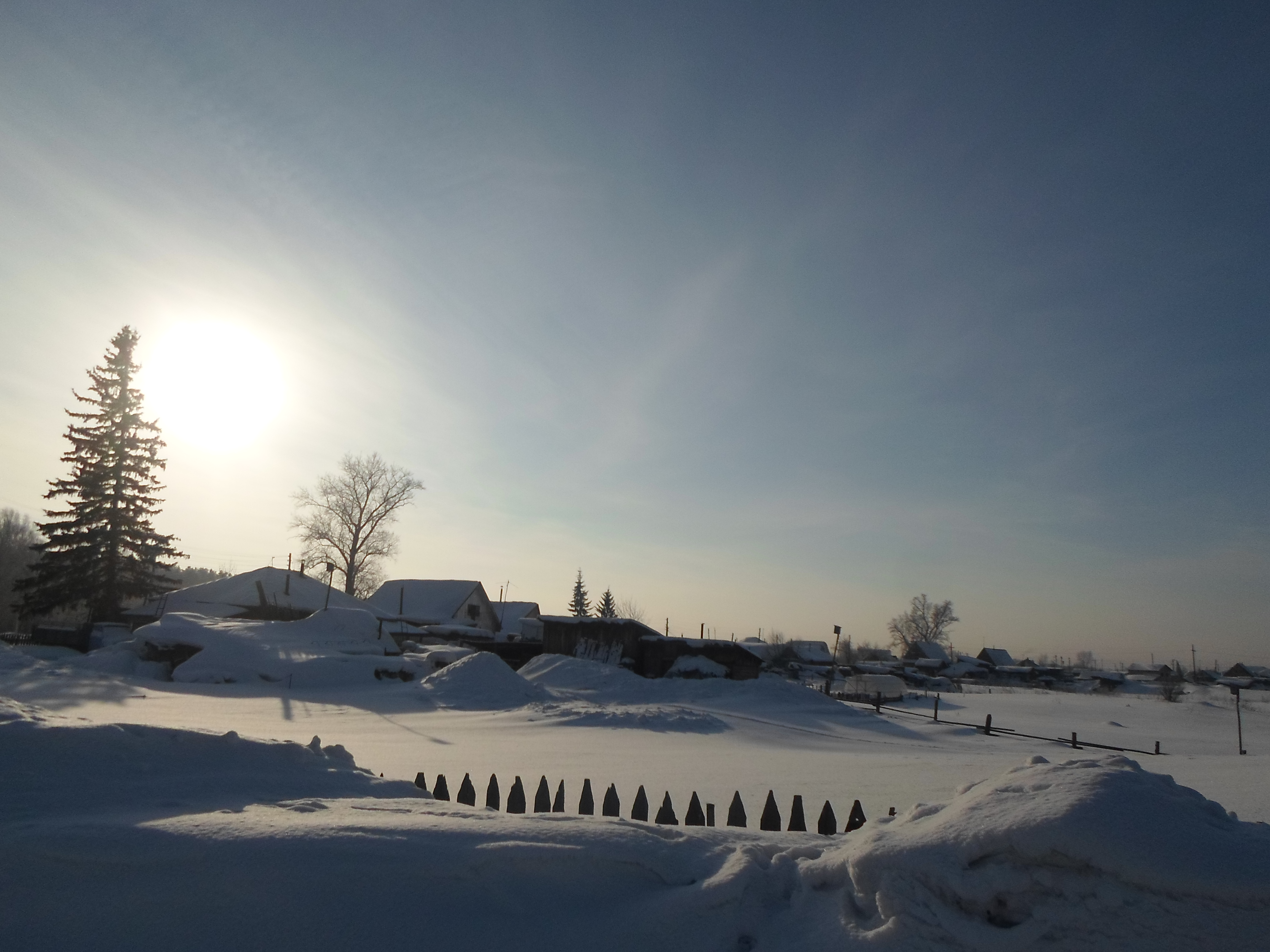
Cold sunny day in Zudilovo

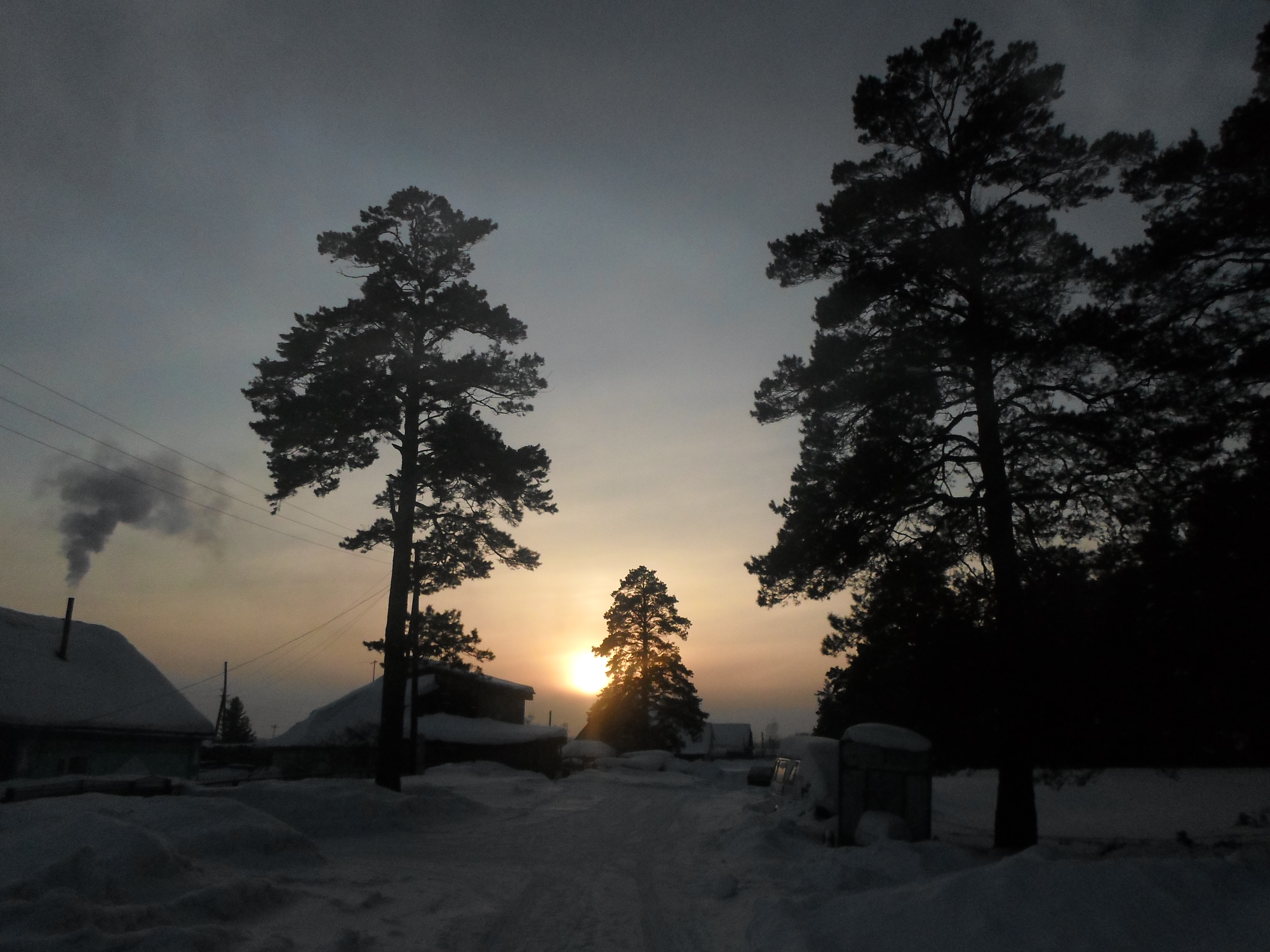
Sunset, Lesnaya St, Zudilovo, Altai Krai

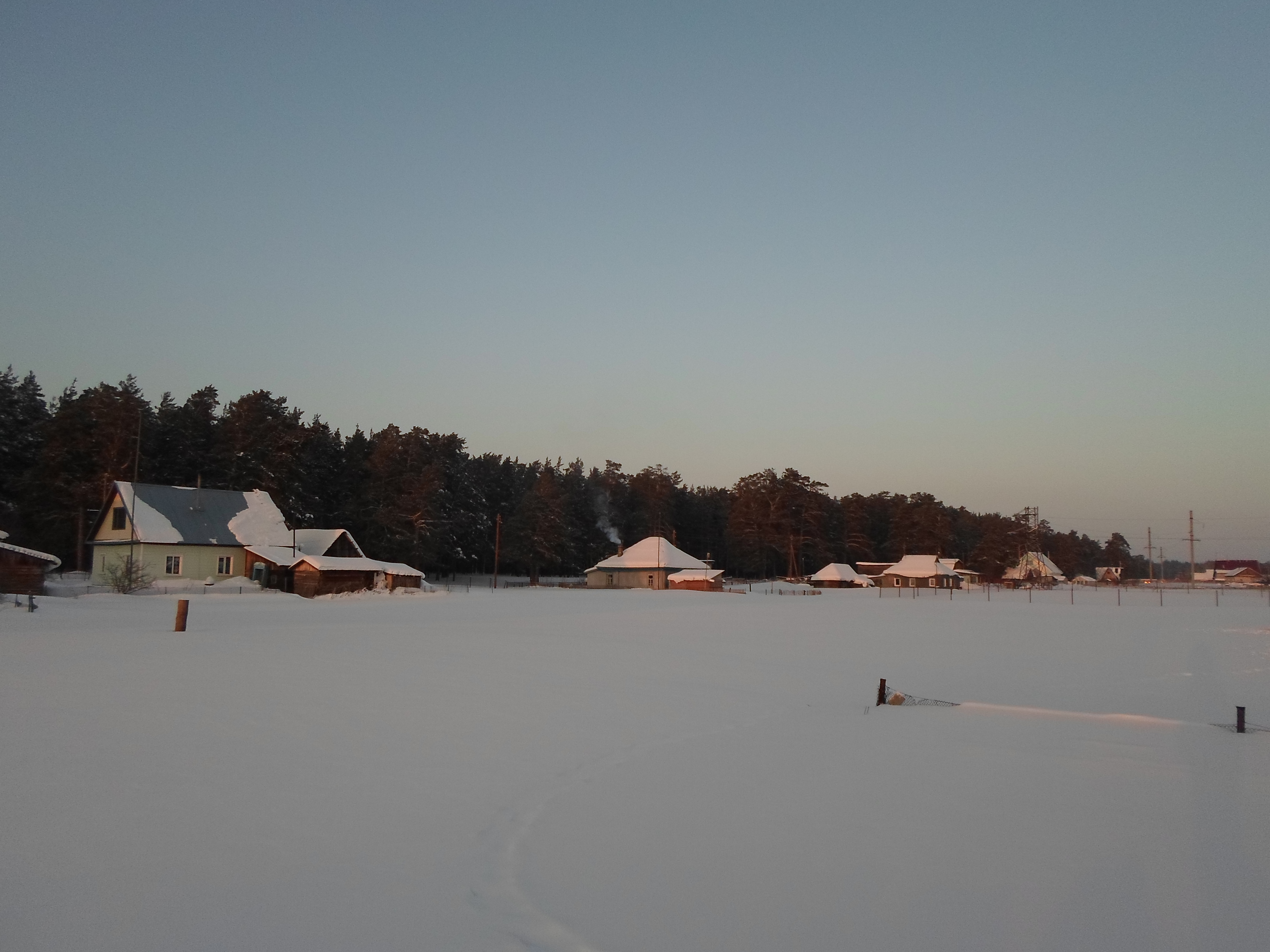
Houses at Lesnaya St, Zudilovo, Altai Krai
