= Pyershamaysk (populated place) =

Pyershamaysk is an agrotown in Shchuchin district, Grodno oblast, Belarus.

Pyershamaysk (Belarusian: Першамайск, Russian: Первомайск) may also refer to the following localities in Belarus:

- Pyershamaysk, Drahichyn district, Brest region
- Pyershamaysk, Stolin district, Brest region
- Pyershamaysk, Zhlobin district, Gomel region
- Pyershamaysk, Karavatsichy rural council, Gomel region
- Pyershamaysk, Kamsamolsk rural council, Gomel region
- Pyershamaysk, Khoyniki district, Gomel region
- Pyershamaysk, Salihorsk district, Minsk region

== See also ==
- Pyervamaysk (populated place)
- Pervomaysk (disambiguation)
