= Pervomaisc =

Pervomaisc may refer to several places in Moldova:

- Pervomaisc, Căuşeni, a commune in Căuşeni district
- Pervomaisc, Transnistria, a commune in Transnistria
- Pervomaisc, a village in Pompa Commune, Făleşti district
- Pervomaisc, a village in Lenin, Transnistria
- Pervomaisc, the Soviet-era name of Marienfeld village, Ialpujeni Commune, Cimişlia district

== See also ==
- Pervomaiscoe (disambiguation)
- Pervomaysk (disambiguation)
- Pervomaysky (disambiguation)
