= Pervoye Maya, Russia =

Pervoye Maya (Russian: Пе́рвое Ма́я) is the name of several inhabited localities in Russia.

Urban localities

- Pervoye Maya, Nizhny Novgorod Oblast, a work settlement in Balakhninsky District of Nizhny Novgorod Oblast

Rural localities

- Pervoye Maya, Astrakhan Oblast, a settlement in Privolzhsky District of Astrakhan Oblast
- Pervoye Maya, Ivanovo Oblast, a village in the Furmanovsky District of Ivanovo Oblast
- Pervoye Maya, name of several other rural localities
