= Ivan Yatskin =

Ukrainian political prisoner kept in Russia (born 1979)

Ivan Hryhorovych Yatskin
- Іван Григорович Яцкін
- Born: 22 October 1979 (age 46); Voikove, Pervomaiske Raion, Crimean Oblast, Ukrainian SSR, Soviet Union
- Known for: Arrest, criminal prosecution and torture by Russian authorities
- Criminal charge: treason
- Criminal penalty: 11 years in prison
- Criminal status: Incarcerated
- Spouse: Gulnara Kadyrova
- Children: 3 (Arsen, Rinat, Riana)

Ivan Hryhorovych Yatskin (Ukrainian: Іван Григорович Яцкін; born 1979) is a Ukrainian citizen from the Crimean Pervomaiske district, who is currently being held as a political prisoner in the Russian Federation.

== Early life ==
Yatskin was born and raised in the village of Voikove in Central Crimea. Before his arrest, Yatskin and his family lived in the regional capital of Simferopol. He is married and has three children.

Following the beginning of the Russian occupation of Crimea, Yatskin continued to display his pro-Ukrainian stances, despite the threat of possible repressions like arbitrary arrest, torture, kidnapping and criminal prosecution, which are commonly applied by Russian-installed authorities in order to suppress the display of pro-Ukrainian sentiment on the peninsula.

== Arrest, trial and imprisonment ==
On 16 October 2019, Yatskin was arrested when FSB agents raided his home and seized multiple electronical devices and his Ukrainian documents. Denys Didenko, a Ukrainian judge of the Kyivskyi District Court in Simferopol, who switched sides after the Russian takeover, charged Yatskin with "treason" under Article 275 of the Criminal Code of the Russian Federation and placed him under pre-trial custody for two months. For further legal proceedings, Yatskin was immediately transferred to Russia. The Lefortovo District Court in the Russian capital of Moscow extended his pre-trial arrest seven times and refused to grant him medical treatment, despite Yatskin's deteriorating health condition and signs of frostbite.

On 9 April 2021, he was transferred back to Simferopol, where his criminal case would start 11 days later. On 21 May, Ivan Yatskin was sentenced 11 years in a high-security penal colony. His appeal was dismissed four months later. Following his sentence, he was transferred back to Russia, where he was temporarily held in Krasnodar and Saratov, while he entered a hunger strike, before being relocated to the Belovo Penal Colony in the Siberian Kemerovo Oblast. On 27 January 2022, a Russian court prohibited a visit for Yatskin by the Ukrainian Consul in Novosibirsk. As of August 2024, Yatskin remains in Russian captivity.

== Torture & human rights abuses ==
In addition to torture, the Kharkiv Human Rights Protection Group and the Crimean Human Rights Group noted that Russian authorities were not only systematically denying Yatskin access to medical care, but also kept him in insanitary conditions, despite him suffering from thrombophlebitis, frostbite and vascular ulcers. According to his family, Yatskin is also exposed to violence, death threats and humiliation from the prison staff, as well as arbitrary punishment, such as solitary confinement.
