= Pervomaysky Urban Settlement =

Pervomaysky Urban Settlement or Pervomayskoye Urban Settlement is the name of several municipal formations in Russia.

- Pervomaysky Urban Settlement, a municipal formation which the Work Settlement of Pervomaysky in Gorodetsky District of Nizhny Novgorod Oblast is incorporated as
- Pervomaysky Urban Settlement, a municipal formation which Pervomaysky Settlement Council in Pervomaysky District of Tambov Oblast is incorporated as
- Pervomaysky Urban Settlement, a municipal formation which the Urban-Type Settlement of Pervomaysky in Shchyokinsky District of Tula Oblast is incorporated as
- Pervomayskoye Urban Settlement, a municipal formation which the Work Settlement of Pervomaysky in Korkinsky District of Chelyabinsk Oblast is incorporated as
- Pervomayskoye Urban Settlement, a municipal formation which the urban-type settlement of Pervomaysky and three rural localities in Shilkinsky District of Zabaykalsky Krai are incorporated as

== See also ==
- Pervomaysky (disambiguation)
