= Pervomaysk, Russia =

Pervomaysk (Russian: Первома́йск) is the name of several inhabited localities in Russia.

Urban localities

- Pervomaysk, Nizhny Novgorod Oblast, a town in Pervomaysky District of Nizhny Novgorod Oblast

Rural localities

- Pervomaysk, Republic of Bashkortostan, a village in Pervomaysky Selsoviet of Nurimanovsky District of the Republic of Bashkortostan
- Pervomaysk, Chuvash Republic, a settlement in Khormalinskoye Rural Settlement of Ibresinsky District of the Chuvash Republic
- Pervomaysk, Kirov Oblast, a settlement in Sinegorsky Rural Okrug of Nagorsky District of Kirov Oblast
- Pervomaysk, Krasnoyarsk Krai, a settlement in Pervomaysky Selsoviet of Motyginsky District of Krasnoyarsk Krai
- Pervomaysk, Republic of Mordovia, a selo in Pervomaysky Selsoviet of Lyambirsky District of the Republic of Mordovia
- Pervomaysk, Orenburg Oblast, a village in Pervomaysky Selsoviet of Kuvandyksky District of Orenburg Oblast
- Pervomaysk, Sakhalin Oblast, a selo in Smirnykhovsky District of Sakhalin Oblast
- Pervomaysk, Samara Oblast, a selo in Pokhvistnevsky District of Samara Oblast
- Pervomaysk, Tomsk Oblast, a village in Bakcharsky District of Tomsk Oblast
- Pervomaysk, Tver Oblast, a village in Konakovsky District of Tver Oblast
- Pervomaysk, Udmurt Republic, a village in Karakulinsky Selsoviet of Karakulinsky District of the Udmurt Republic

== See also ==
- Pervomaysk (disambiguation)
