= Pershe Travnia =

Pershe Travnia (Ukrainian: Перше Травня) is a Ukrainian toponym. Places that formerly held the name include:

- The former name of Kompaniiske, Cherkasy Oblast
- The former name of Leontovychi, Donetsk Oblast
- The former name of Novokostiantynivka, Sumy Oblast
- The former name of Ozarianivka, Donetsk Oblast
- The former name of Serbynivka, Poltava Oblast
- The former name of Zdorivka, Kirovohrad Oblast

== Etymology ==
It literally means "the first of May", in reference to the International Workers' Day holiday that takes place on that date. It shares the same etymology with the toponyms Pershotravenka, Pershotravensk, and Pervomaiske, among others. In the Ukrainian language, the adjective for something or someone related to a place named Pershe Travnia is pershotravnenskyi (перошотравненський).

== Controversy and removal ==
The holiday itself that these localities are named after has long been regarded in Ukraine as not integral to actual Ukrainian traditions, and as an imposition by the government of the Soviet Union that ruled Ukraine for much of the 20th century. "Pershe Travnia" has been described as a "typical Soviet oeconym, not so much red as pink, not so much communist as social democratic."

In 2016, as part of laws enacting decommunization in Ukraine, the settlement of Pershe Travnia in Bakhmut Raion, Donetsk Oblast was renamed to Ozarianivka. Due to the law "On the Condemnation and Prohibition of Propaganda of Russian Imperial Policy in Ukraine and the Decolonization of Toponymy", signed in April 2023 by Ukrainian president Volodymyr Zelenskyy, all remaining localities in Ukraine with the name "Pershe Travnia" or other May Day-related toponyms is set to be renamed by 27 January 2024. The Ukrainian Institute of National Memory described Pershe Travnia, along with the other toponyms related to May Day, as "a clear example of massive Soviet ideological toponymic nomination aimed at glorifying the proletariat as the hegemon of the class struggle, the driving force of the October Revolution of 1917 and the future 'world revolution.'"

Most Ukrainian populated places named after May Day were renamed in September 2024.
