= Pervomaiscoe =

Pervomaiscoe may refer to several places in Moldova:

- Pervomaiscoe, Drochia, a commune in Drochia district
- Pervomaiscoe, Hînceşti, a commune in Hînceşti district

== See also ==
- Pervomaisc (disambiguation)
- Pervomaysky (disambiguation)
