= Bolshaya Glushitsa =

Bolshaya Glushitsa (Russian: Большая Глушица) is the name of several rural localities in Russia:

- Bolshaya Glushitsa, Samara Oblast, a selo in Bolsheglushitsky District of Samara Oblast
- Bolshaya Glushitsa, Volgograd Oblast, a khutor in Yeterevsky Selsoviet of Mikhaylovsky District of Volgograd Oblast
