= Melnychne, Crimea =

Village in Crimea, Ukraine

Melnychne Мельничне
- Village
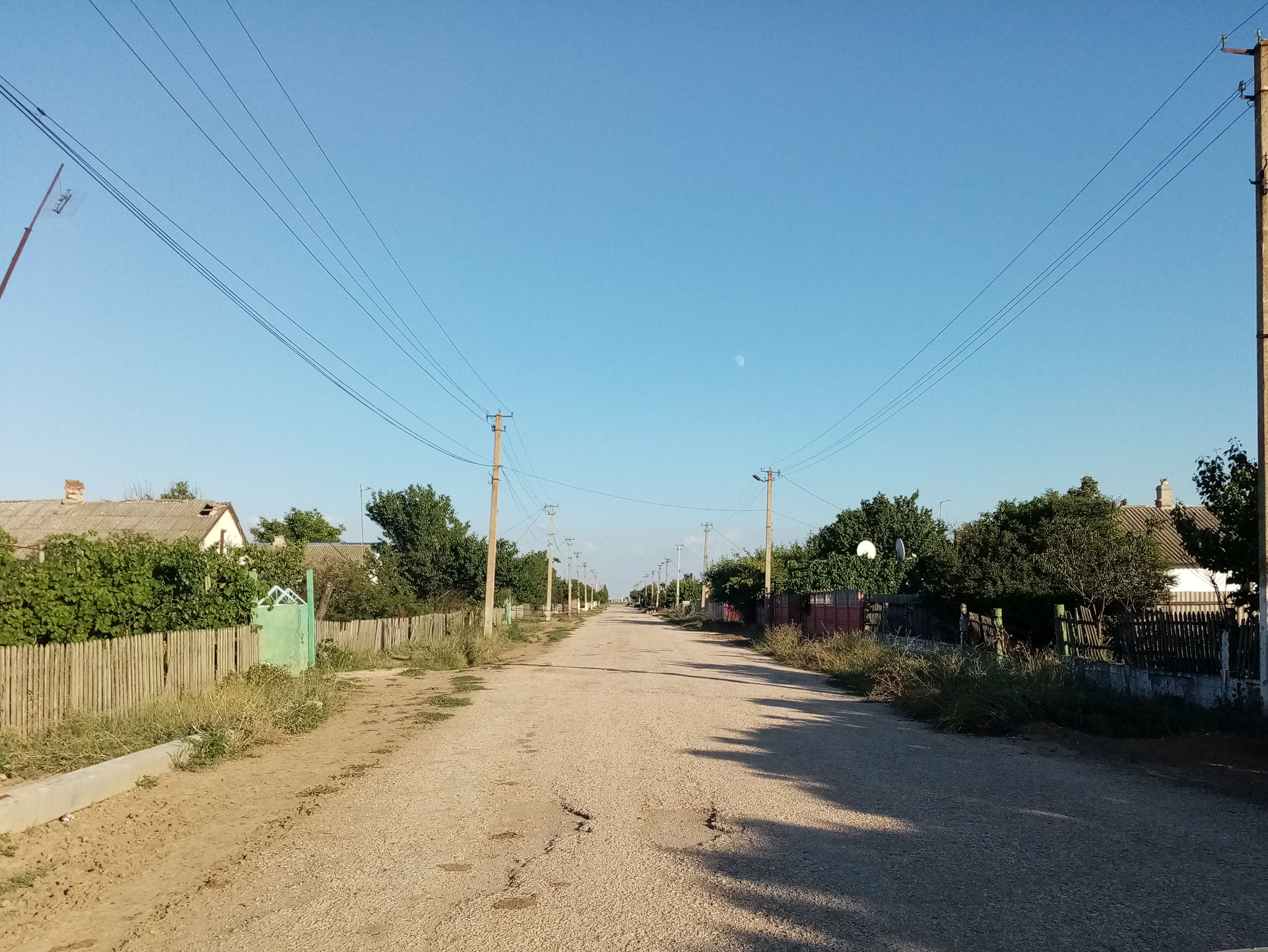

- Location within Crimea Location within Ukraine
- Coordinates: 45°45′52″N 34°2′5″E
- Country: Ukraine (occupied by Russia)
- Republic: Autonomous Republic of Crimea
- Raion: Pervomaiske Raion

Government
  - Mayor: Anatoliy Leonidovych Kolyesnik

Area
  - Total: 0.64 km^{2} (0.25 sq mi)
- Elevation: 11 m (36 ft)

Population (2001)
  - Total: 391
  - Density: 610/km^{2} (1,600/sq mi)
- Time zone: UTC+2 (EET)
  - Summer (DST): UTC+3 (EEST)
- Postal code: 96315
- Area code: +380 6552
- Vehicle registration: AK/KK/01

Melnychne (Ukrainian: Мельничне; Russian: Мельничнoе; German: Alexanderfeld; Crimean Tatar: Kütüke), is a village in the Pervomaiske Raion, Autonomous Republic of Crimea, Ukraine. Due to the Russian occupation of Crimea and its subsequent unilateral annexation of the region, the settlement is subject to an ongoing territorial dispute between Ukraine and the Russian Federation, and remains under de facto Russian control since early 2014.

== History ==
The settlement was established in 1878 as a joint Lutheran-Mennonite colony by ethnic German settlers under the German name of Alexanderfeld (Russian: Kumyuke Nemetskoye). As of the first Soviet census in 1926, the village had a total population of 116 inhabitants, of whom 109 were ethnic Germans, 4 Ukrainians and 3 Jews. As the result of the Second World War, the German population was ethnically cleansed from the settlement, and subsequently deported to the territory of the Kazakh SSR.

On 27 February 2014, following the Revolution of Dignity, which ousted the Russia-friendly Ukrainian President Viktor Yanukovych, unmarked Russian troops invaded and occupied the Crimean peninsula. On 16 March, Russian-installed authorities conducted a referendum, which was overwhelmingly considered to be sham vote. The vote resulted in the unilateral annexation of the entirety of the Autonomous Republic of Crimea, yet the annexation remains vastly unrecognized.

== Demographics ==
As of the 2001 Ukrainian census, Melnychne had a population of 391 inhabitants, a negligible decrease from 392 in 1989. The settlement is mostly Ukrainophone, while large Russian-speaking and Crimean Tatar speaking minorities exist in the village. In terms of ethnicities, it is estimated that ethnic Ukrainians constitute a large majority in Melnychne, while ethnic Russians, Crimean Tatars and Belarusians make up significant minority groups. The exact native language composition was as follows:

Native languages in Melnychne
	percent
Ukrainian	50.4%
Russian	34.5%
Crimean Tatar	14.1%
Belarusian	0.5%
others	0.5%
