= Svetlana Zhiltsova =

Soviet television presenter (1936–2026)

- Светлана Жильцова
- Born: 30 November 1936; Moscow, Russian SFSR, USSR
- Died: 3 February 2026 (aged 89); Moscow, Russia
- Occupation: television presenter

Svetlana Alekseevna Zhiltsova (Russian: Светла́на Алексе́евна Жильцо́ва; 30 November 1936 – 3 February 2026) was a Soviet television presenter who was awarded the title Honored Artist of the RSFSR (1978).

== Life and career ==
Svetlana Alekseevna Zhiltsova was born in Moscow on 30 November 1936.

As a schoolgirl, she attended the art studio at the Moscow Pioneers Palace. After high school, she enrolled on the Institute of Foreign Languages (English Language Faculty). After graduation she got a job in television, initially as a program guide broadcaster.

Svetlana Zhiltsova hosted numerous children's programs, including Funny Notes, Alarm Clock, Good Night, Little Ones!, the magazine show Pioneer, and various quiz shows for youngsters.

In 1961, she became the co-presenter of the popular comedy game show KVN, alongside Alexander Maslyakov.

She participated in several training programs in the English language. In Japan she twice hosted Russian-language educational TV projects.

In 1993, she left television. Later, she taught at the Higher National School of Television, until retirement.

In 2011, she was awarded the Order of Honor.

Zhiltsova died on 3 February 2026, at the age of 89.
