= Pershotravneve =

Pershotravneve is Ukrainian toponym. Pershotravneve, literally meaning 'May Day', 'International Workers' Day', may also refer to several other settlements in Ukraine:

- The former name of Kamianka, Polohy Raion, Zaporizhzhia Oblast
- The former name of Kvartsytne
- The former name of Manhush, Donetsk Oblast

== See also ==
- Pershotravensk, a former name of Shakhtarske, Dnipropetrovsk Oblast
- Pervomaiske, a synonymous Ukrainian toponym loaned from the Russian language
