= Sergeyevka, Podgorensky District, Voronezh Oblast =

Sergeyevka Сергеевка
- Selo
- Location within Voronezh Oblast Location within Russia
- Coordinates: 50°25′N 39°48′E
- Country: Russia
- Region: Voronezh Oblast
- District: Podgorensky District
- Time zone: UTC+3:00

Sergeyevka (Russian: Серге́евка) is a rural locality (a selo) and the administrative center of Sergeyevskoye Rural Settlement, Podgorensky District, Voronezh Oblast, Russia. The population was 1,096 as of 2010. There are 8 streets.

== Geography ==
Sergeyevka is located 15 km east of Podgorensky (the district's administrative centre) by road. Morozovka is the nearest rural locality.
