= Bolshaya Glushitsa, Volgograd Oblast =

Bolshaya Glushitsa Большая Глушица
- Khutor
- Location within Volgograd Oblast Location within Russia
- Coordinates: 50°14′N 43°35′E
- Country: Russia
- Region: Volgograd Oblast
- District: Mikhaylovka Urban Okrug
- Time zone: UTC+4:00

Bolshaya Glushitsa (Russian: Большая Глушица) is a rural locality (a khutor) in Mikhaylovka Urban Okrug, Volgograd Oblast, Russia. The population was 105 as of 2010. There are 5 streets.

== Geography ==
Bolshaya Glushitsa is located 37 km northeast of Mikhaylovka. Sennoy is the nearest rural locality.

== History ==
As of 1859, Bolshaya Glushitsa was in the list of settlements of the Don Cossacks under No. 1787. There were 10 households in the village, 27 men and 30 women.
