= Ozarianivka =

Coordinates: 48°27′02″N 37°57′19″E

Ozarianivka (Ukrainian: Озарянівка), known as Pershe Travnia (Ukrainian: Перше Травня) before 2016, is a rural settlement in Toretsk urban hromada, Bakhmut Raion, Donetsk Oblast, Ukraine. It had a population of 413 in 2001. It is located 15 kilometres (9.3 mi) southwest of Bakhmut.

== History ==
Before 2016, the settlement was known as Pershe Travnia. On 18 February 2016, the Verkhovna Rada of Ukraine passed a law renaming Pershe Travnia to Ozarianivka as part of decommunization in Ukraine.

During the battle of Bakhmut of the Russian invasion of Ukraine, Russian forces captured Ozarianivka in November 2022.

== Demographics ==
According to the 2001 Ukrainian census, the population was 413, of whom 36.56% spoke Ukrainian, and 62.95% spoke Russian.
