= Pervomaysk, Republic of Bashkortostan =

Pervomaysk Первомайск
- Village
- Location within Bashkortostan Location within Russia
- Coordinates: 55°24′N 57°03′E
- Country: Russia
- Region: Bashkortostan
- District: Nurimanovsky District
- Time zone: UTC+5:00

Pervomaysk (Russian: Первомайск) is a rural locality (a village) and the administrative centre of Pervomaysky Selsoviet, Nurimanovsky District, Bashkortostan, Russia. The population was 355 as of 2010. There are 3 streets.

== Geography ==
Pervomaysk is located 53 km northeast of Krasnaya Gorka (the district's administrative centre) by road. Sarva is the nearest rural locality.
