= Pervomaysk =

Pervomaysk, or Pervomaisk, is a popular toponym in countries of the former Soviet Union that is derived from the holiday May Day (Russian: Первое Мая, Pervoye Maya), the International Workers' Day.

Pervomaysk or Pervomaisk may refer to:

- Pervomaysk, Russia, multiple places in Russia
- Pervomaisk, Ukraine, multiple places in Ukraine

== See also ==
- Pervomaisc (disambiguation), toponyms in Moldova
- Pervoye Maya (disambiguation)
- Pervomaysky (disambiguation)
- Pervomaiske (disambiguation)
- Pervomaiske Raion, a district in Crimea, Ukraine
