= Alexander Oleshko =

Russian actor and singer (born 1976)

- Александр Олешко
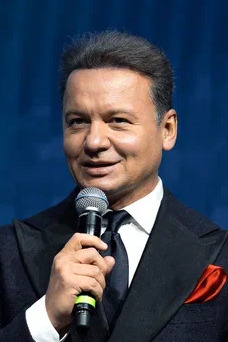
- Oleshko in 2024
- Born: Alexander Vladimirovich Oleshko; 23 July 1976 (age 49); Chișinău, Moldavian SSR, Soviet Union
- Citizenship: Russian
- Occupations: Actor; TV presenter; singer; parodist
- Years active: 1991–present
- Height: 1.80 m (5 ft 11 in)
- Spouse(s): Olga Belova (m. 1998–2000, divorced)
- Parent(s): Vladimir Oleshko, Lyudmila Oleshko
- Website: oleshko.info

Alexander Vladimirovich Oleshko (Russian: Алекса́ндр Влади́мирович Оле́шко; born 23 July 1976) is a Russian theater and film actor, TV presenter, singer, parodist. Honored Artist of Russia (2015). Member of the Union of Theatre Workers of the Russian Federation. People's Artist of the Russian Federation (2025).

== Biography ==
Oleshko was born on 23 July 1976 in Chișinău.

His years of childhood and adolescence were in Moldova. In 1991, aged 15, he moved to Moscow, where he entered the State College of Circus and Variety Art and graduated from it, receiving a red diploma with honors. In 1999 he graduated from the Boris Shchukin Theatre Institute (course of Vladimir Ivanov). Since that year he has been in the troupe of the Moscow Satire Theatre. From 2000 to 2010, in the group of the Sovremennik Theatre. As a guest actor he plays in the plays of the Vakhtangov State Academic Theatre.

Teacher of acting at the State College of Circus and Variety Art.

From autumn 2009 until early 2017 he worked as a leading entertainer of a number of entertainment programs on Channel One Russia. In the summer of 2017, he moved to the NTV, since on the Channel One there were no suitable projects for him.

In April and May 2022, Oleshko participated in a series of concerts organized in order to support the 2022 Russian invasion of Ukraine.
