= Irina Kazakova =

Russian rhythmic gymnast

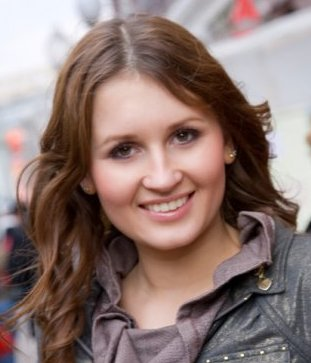

Personal information
- Born: September 23, 1986 (age 39)

Gymnastics career
- Discipline: Rhythmic gymnastics
- Country represented: Russia

Irina Kazakova (Russian: Ирина Валерьевна Казакова; born September 23, 1986) is known as one of the world's most flexible rhythmic gymnasts. She specializes in contortion and rhythmic gymnastics on Russia's national team. She is trained with a personal trainer, with whom she works on her oversplits. Her most popular performance is her "Snake Dance". As a rhythmic gymnast, she has performed with the ball, clubs, hoop, and ribbons.

Kazakova currently resides in Los Angeles. She is a certified free diver & scuba diver, and has worked in underwater modeling performance.

She is also known for underwater and fashion/portrait photography.

== Awards and honors ==
- 2002: Honored Master of Sports in Rhythmic Gymnastics, Russian Award, Government of Russia (The highest national honor for achievements in this field)
- 2002–2007: Russian National Rhythmic Gymnastics Team member
- 2003: 1st Place – Russian Open Cup Rhythmic Gymnastics
- 2003: “Miss Cleopatra” rhythmic gymnastics award, Alexandria, Egypt
- 2007: Finalist, The Minute of the Glory (Russian version of America's Got Talent)
- 2007: Record winner of The Show of Russian Records 2010
- 2008 "Shock News" TV show - Featured, Contortionist, Tokyo, Japan
- 2007-2009 "Golden Ice of Stradivary" tour, "The road to Vancouver" tour, "King of Ice". Aerialist tour, Contortionist
- 2009 "Art on Ice" - Aerialist, Contortionist, Zurich, Lausanne, Switzerland
- 2010 Launching "Material Girl" Madonna's new clothing line and new single

Contortionist, New York

- 2010 "MTV Music Awards" - Contortionist, Miami Beach, FL
- 2012 Theater "Belini" by Cipriani, Contortionist, Ibiza, Spain
- 2012 Snoop Dogg Presents : The Bad Girls of Comedy (TV movie, netflix) Contortionist, Los Angeles

Featured on MSNBC

- 2013 Talent, Contortionist in Dance nation - Los Angeles, California
- 2013 Movie Pain & Gain ( directed by Michael Bay) Contortionist, Miami Beach, FL
- 2010-2019 ULTRA - Aerialist, contortionist, Miami, FL2014
- 2013 Featured on Discovery Channel - Photo exhibition, Art collaboration with Gino Tozzi LMNT Gallery, Miami, FL
- 2016-2017 C'est Rouge Circus-Cabaret Show - Contortionist/ Aerialist, Faena Theater, Miami Beach, FL
- 2017 Die Antwoord's music video "FFFF" - Contortionist, Los Angeles, California
- 2017 - Die Antwoord's short comedy horror film "Tommy can't sleep". Contortionist, Los Angeles, California
- 2017-2018 "Sensatia" Circus / Cabaret - Contortionist - Faena Theater, Miami Beach, FL
