= Pervomaiske, Crimea =

Pervomaiske Russian: Первомайское Ukrainian: Первомайське Crimean Tatar: Curçı
- Urban-type settlement
- Interactive map of Pervomaiske
- Location of Pervomaiske in Crimea
- Coordinates: 45°42′58″N 33°51′28″E
- Republic: Crimea
- District: Pervomaiske Raion
- Town status: 1959

Government
  - Town Head: Volodymyr Kobylitsa
- Elevation: 30 m (98 ft)

Population (2014)
  - Total: 8,470
- Time zone: UTC+3 (MSK)
- Postal code: 96300 — 96304
- Area code: +380 6552
- Website: http://rada.gov.ua/

Pervomaiske (Ukrainian: Первомайське; Russian: Первомайское; Crimean Tatar: Curçı) (until 1944, Curçı) is an urban-type settlement in the Autonomous Republic of Crimea, a territory recognized by a majority of countries as part of Ukraine and incorporated by Russia as the Republic of Crimea. The town also serves as the administrative center of the Pervomaiske Raion (district), housing the district's local administration buildings.

As of the 2001 Ukrainian Census, its population was 9,384. Current population: 8,470 (2014 Census).

== Notable people ==
- Serhiy Kostynskyi (born 1982), Ukrainian journalist, soldier and political adviser
