= Alexander Maslyakov =

Soviet and Russian television presenter (1941–2024)

- Александр Масляков
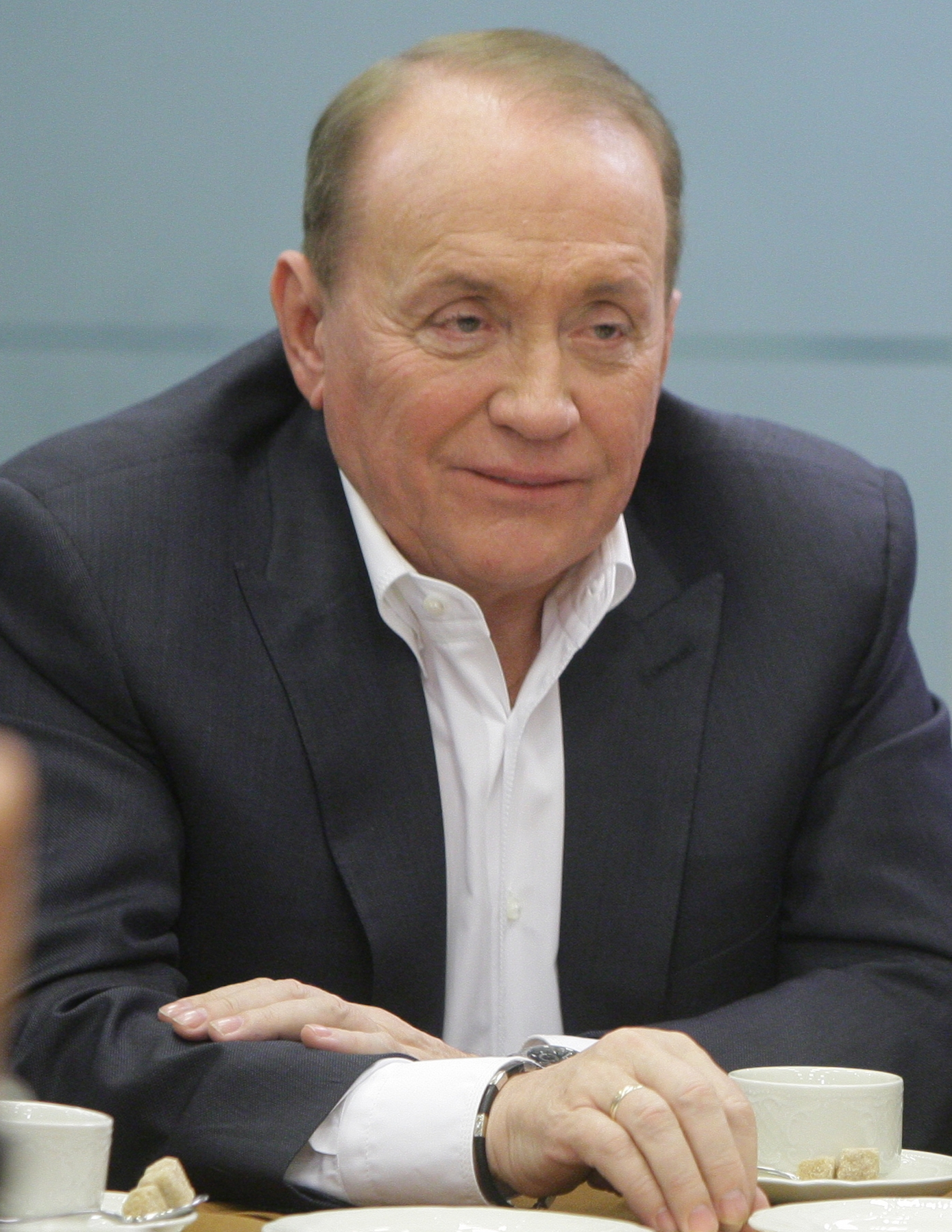
- Maslyakov in 2011
- Born: 24 November 1941; Sverdlovsk, Russian SFSR, USSR
- Died: 8 September 2024 (aged 82); Moscow, Russia
- Education: Moscow State University of Railway Engineering
- Years active: 1964–2022
- Known for: KVN

Alexander Vasilyevich Maslyakov (Russian: Александр Васильевич Масляков; 24 November 1941 – 8 September 2024) was a Soviet and Russian television game show host. Maslyakov's most notable as the leader and presenter of the TV show KVN from 1964 to 2022.

== Game shows ==
Maslyakov had been working in television since 1964. He had hosted numerous game shows in this time, including Hello, We Looking for Talents, Addresses of Young Ones, Fun Kids, the long-running Come on, Girls, in which young women competed against one another in skills such as cooking, dancing, or milking cows, and its short-lived counterpart for young men, Come on, Guys. He was also the first host (1974) of what subsequently became one of Russia's longest-running game shows, What? Where? When?.

Maslyakov was the regular host of Soviet coverage of World Festivals of Youth and Students, held in such major world capitals as Sofia, Havana, (East) Berlin, Pyongyang, and Moscow, as well as hosting a number of popular Soviet Eurovision-style lip-synching song competitions over the years.

== KVN ==
Maslyakov was most famous, however, for his involvement in the game show KVN (Club of the happy and inventive), a game show nearly as long-lived as What? Where? When?, in which teams of enthusiastic and clever young people (usually university students) compete against one another in a series of improvised and rehearsed comedic and musical skits and witty repartee (and occasionally cutting-edge politically risque satire and social commentary) in front of a live audience and a jury of stars of stage and screen. KVN went on the air in 1961, and Maslyakov became its host in 1964, while still a student himself. He remained at the helm ever since, and ran the production company that owns the show itself and all spinoff rights. Maslyakov was the president of the International Union of KVN and the host of all the games of the Major League of KVN as well as of the annual KVN festivals in Sochi and Jūrmala until his retirement in 2022.

== Education and awards ==
Maslyakov graduated in 1966 from the Moscow Institute of Transport Engineers and in 1968 he completed Higher Courses for Television Workers. He was a Merited Figure of the Arts of the Russian Federation, 1994 laureate of the Ovation prize, and a member of the Academy of Russian Television. In 2002 he was awarded the highest honor of the Academy of Russian Television, the TEFI For individual contribution to the development of domestic television. In 2006, in commemoration of the 45th anniversary of KVN, the then-president of the Russian Federation conferred the Order of Merit for the Fatherland Grade IV on Maslyakov for a significant contribution to the development of domestic television and many years of creative activity.

== Personal life and death ==
Maslyakov was born in Sverdlovsk (now Yekaterinburg) on 24 November 1941. He was married to Svetlana and had a son, Alexander, who also entered the entertainment industry.

Maslyakov died from lung cancer in Moscow, on 8 September 2024, at the age of 82.

== Filmography ==
- Arch-chi-medes! (1975) as entertainer
- I Don't Want to Be an Adult (1982) as TV presenter
- How to Become Happy (1985) as competition host
