= Pervomaysky Okrug =

Pervomaysky Okrug may refer to:

- Pervomaysky Urban Okrug, a municipal formation of the closed urban-type settlement of Pervomaysky, Kirov Oblast, Russia
- Pervomaysky Administrative Okrug, a city division of Murmansk, Russia
