= Pervoye Maya =

Pervoye Maya (Russian: Первое Мая, lit. '1st of May', 'the International Workers' Day').

It may refer to:

- Pervoye Maya, Russia, name of several inhabited localities in Russia
- Pervoye Maya, Almaty, Kazakhstan
- Pervoye Maya, Jalal-Abad, a village in Bazar-Korgon District, Jalal-Abad Region, Kyrgyzstan
- Pervoye Maya, Kara-Kulja, a village in Kara-Kulja District, Osh Region, Kyrgyzstan
- Pervoye Maya, alternative name of Bir May, a village in Azerbaijan
