= Birinchi May District, Bishkek =

Birinchi May District Биринчи май району
- district
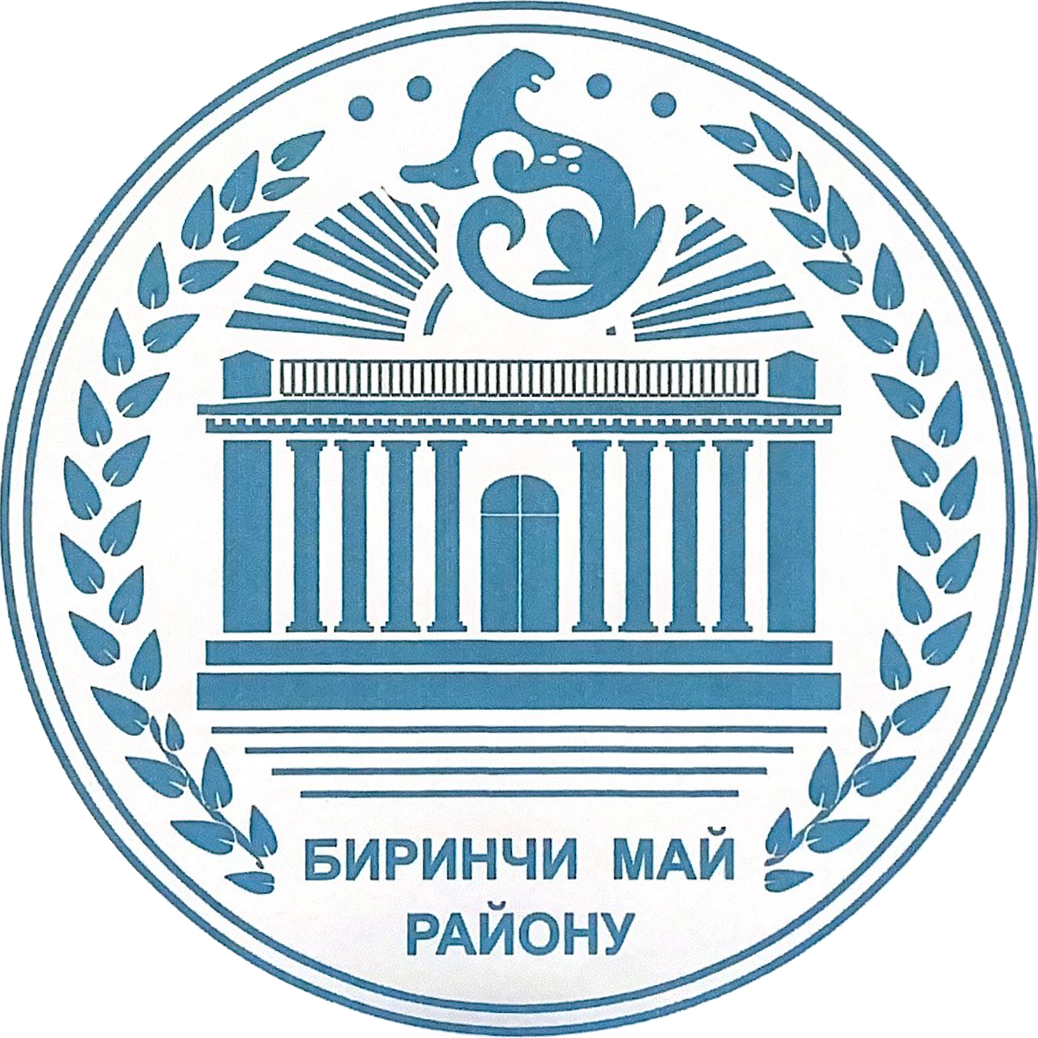
- Coat of arms

- Location within Kyrgyzstan
- Coordinates: 42°53′N 74°36′E
- Country: Kyrgyzstan
- Region: Bishkek City

Government
  - Akim: Yrsaliev Jamalbek Samarbekovich

Population (2009)
  - Total: 171,467

The Birinchi May District (Kyrgyz: Биринчи май району, romanized: Birinchi may rayonu, Russian: Первомайский район, romanized: Pervomaysky rayon, First of May) is a district of the capital city of Bishkek in northern Kyrgyzstan. Its resident population was 171,467 in 2009. It covers the city centre and the northwestern part of the city.

== Demographics ==
Historical populations in Birinchi May District
Year	Pop.	±% p.a.
1970	132,361	—
1979	136,394	+0.33%
1989	138,258	+0.14%
1999	156,326	+1.24%
2009	171,467	+0.93%
Note: resident population; Source:

=== Ethnic composition ===
According to the 2009 Census, the ethnic composition (residential population) of the Birinchi May District was:

Ethnic group	Proportion
Kyrgyzs	70.2%
Russians	20.5%
Koreans	1.8%
Tatars	1.2%
Uzbeks	1.2%
Kazakhs	1.0%
Ukrainians	0.9%
Other groups	3.2%
