= Pervomaiske Raion =

Coordinates: 45°42′54″N 33°51′24″E

Pervomaiske Raion Первомайський район
- Raion
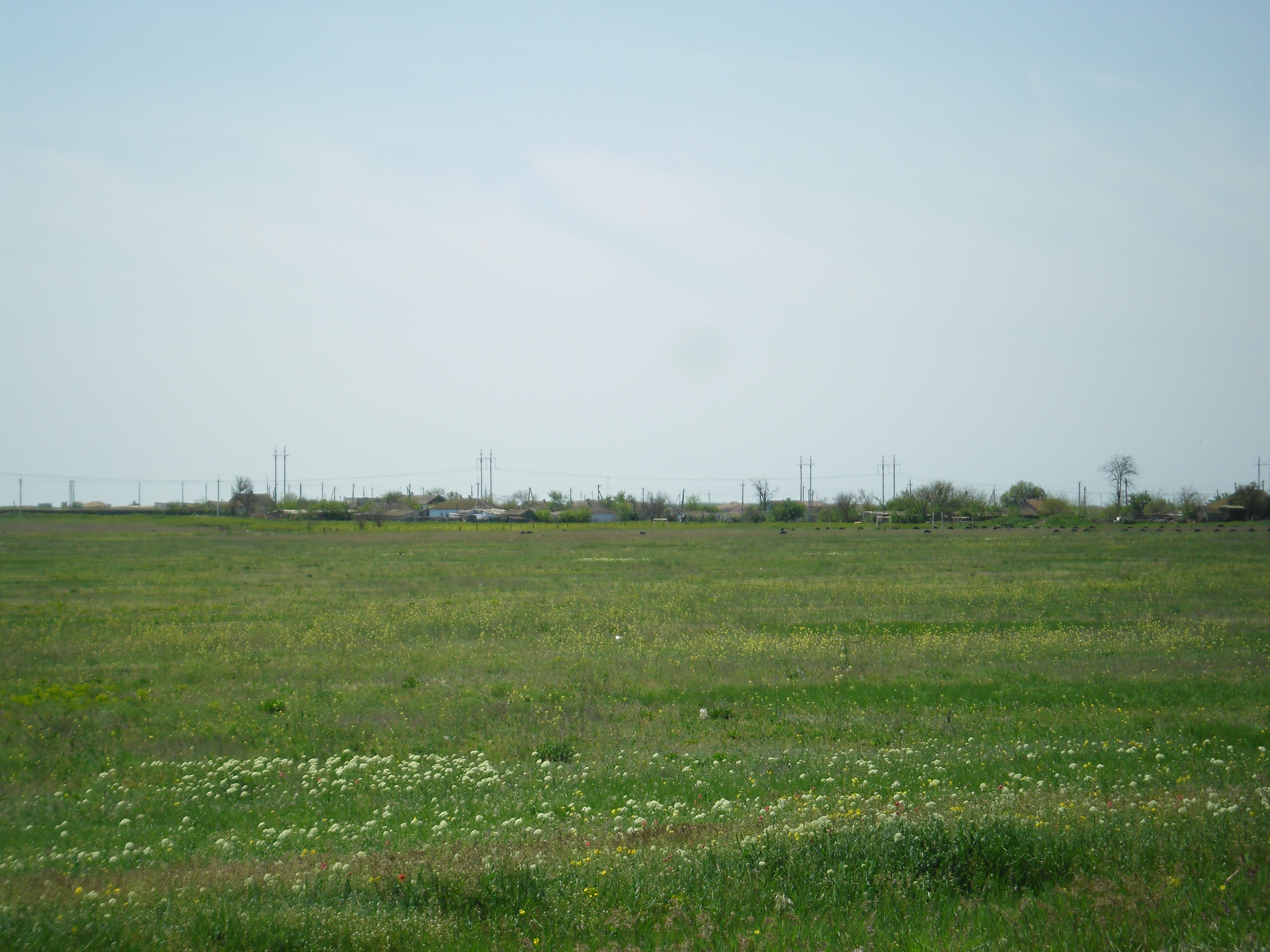
- Village (selo) Vidkryte, Pervomaiske District

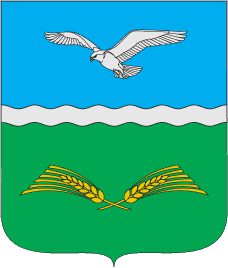
- Flag Seal
- Raion location within Crimea
- Country: Ukraine (Russian-occupied)
- Republic: Crimea
- Capital: Pervomaiske
- Subdivisions: List: 0 cities; 1 towns; 39 villages

Area
  - Total: 1,474 km^{2} (569 sq mi)

Population (2013)
  - Total: 32,789
  - Density: 22.24/km^{2} (57.61/sq mi)
- Time zone: UTC+2 (EET)
  - Summer (DST): UTC+3 (EEST)
- Dialing code: +380-

Pervomaiske Raion (Ukrainian: Первомайський район, Russian: Первомайский район, Crimean Tatar: Curçı rayonı) was one of the twenty-five regions of the Autonomous Republic of Crimea, Ukraine until its abolition in 2020. Russia, which has occupied the entire Crimean Peninsula since 2014, continues to use it as part of its administration, the Republic of Crimea. It is situated in the north-western part of the peninsula. The raion is named after its administrative center, the urban-type settlement of Pervomaiske. Population: 32,789 (2014 Census).

== History ==
=== 2020 Ukrainian administrative reform ===
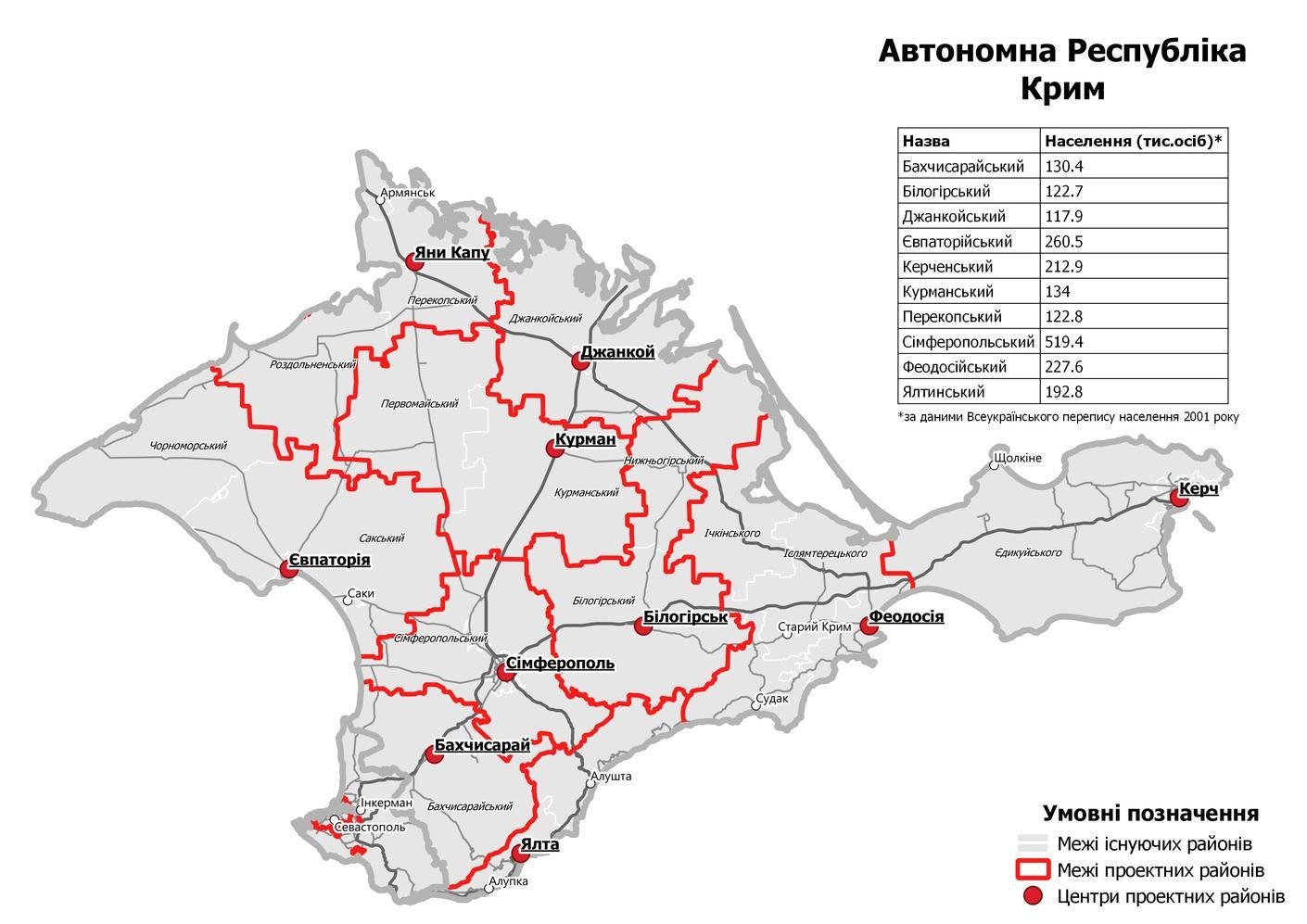
In July 2020, the Verkhovna Rada approved an administrative reform in Crimea

In July 2020, Ukraine conducted an administrative reform throughout its de jure territory. This included Crimea, has been occupied by Russia since 2014. Crimea was reorganized from 14 raions and 11 municipalities into 10 raions, with municipalities abolished altogether.

Pervomaiske Raion was abolished, and its territories to become a part of Qurman Raion, but this has not yet been implemented due to the ongoing Russian occupation.

== Demographics ==
As of the 2001 Ukrainian census, the district had a population of 40,367 inhabitants. In terms of ethnicities, Ukrainians make up a relative majority, followed by large ethnic Russian and Crimean Tatar minorities, as well as smaller Belarusian, Tatar, Polish, Moldovan and Armenian communities. In terms of spoken languages, Russian is the most common language in the district and is primarily spoken in population centers, while Ukrainian and Crimean Tatar is the dominant language in a significant number of settlements.

Ethnic makeup according to the 2001 Ukrainian census:

Ethnic composition of Pervomaiske Raion
	percent
Ukrainians	37.9%
Russians	35.1%
Crimean Tatars	21.5%
Belarusians	1.7%
Tatars	0.7%
Armenians	0.3%
Moldovans	0.3%
Poles	0.3%
Uzbeks	0.3%

Linguistic makeup according to the 2001 Ukrainian census:

Native languages (2001)
	percent
Russian	58.4%
Crimean Tatar	19.9%
Ukrainian	19.3%
Belarusian	0.4%
Moldovan	0.1%
Armenian	0.1%
others	1.4%

=== Settlements in the district ===
- Abrykosove
- Arbuzove
- Bratske
- Chapayeve
- Chernove
- Dalnye
- Dmytrivka
- Frunze
- Hryshyne
- Hvardyiske
- Kalinine
- Kamianka
- Kashtanivka
- Kormove
- Krestianivka
- Krylovka
- Levitanivka
- Makarivka
- Matviivka
- Melnychne
- Nova Derevnya
- Oktyabrske
- Oleksiivka
- Olenivka
- Ostrovske
- Panfilovka
- Pervomaiske
- Pravda
- Pryvilne
- Pshenychne
- Rivne
- Sary-Bash
- Snihurivka
- Stakhanivka
- Stepne
- Susanine
- Sverdlovske
- Tykhonivka
- Uporne
- Vidkryte
- Voikove
- Vypasne

== Notable people ==
- Yuriy Hotsanyuk (born 1966), Ukrainian politician who defected to Russia during the Russian occupation of Crimea
- Rehina Kharchenko (born 1990), Ukrainian politician (Servant of the People), who is currently serving as the mayor of Zaporizhzhia
- Serhiy Kostynskyi (born 1982), Ukrainian journalist, soldier and political adviser
- Ivan Yatskin (born 1979), Ukrainian political prisoner kept by the Russian Federation
