= Stakhanov (disambiguation) =

Stakhanov usually refers to Alexei Stakhanov (1906–1977), a Soviet worker noted for his diligence and the model for the Stakhanovite movement.

Stakhanov may also refer to:

- Stakhanov (surname), a Russian surname
- Kapitalna coal mine, Ukraine, formerly named Stakhanov coal mine
- Stakhanov Railway Car Building Works, Ukraine
- Kadiivka, a city in Ukraine, formerly named Stakhanov
