= Kadiivka =

City in Luhansk Oblast, Ukraine

Kadiivka Кадіївка
- City
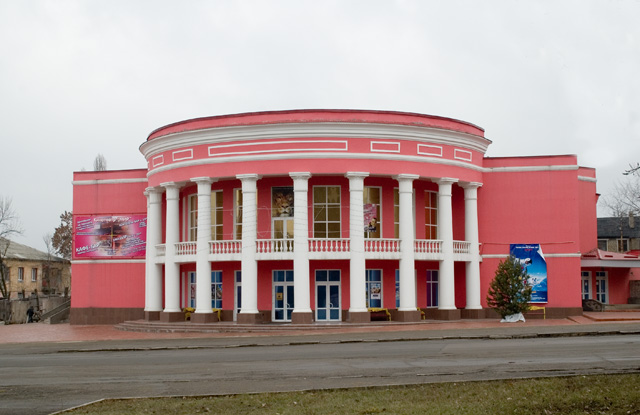
- Mir Cinema

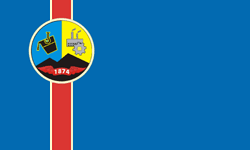
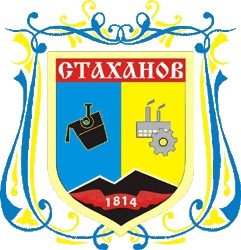
- Flag Coat of arms
- Interactive map of Kadiivka
- Location within Luhansk Oblast Location within Ukraine
- Coordinates: 48°34′05″N 38°39′31″E
- Country: Ukraine
- Oblast: Luhansk Oblast
- Raion: Alchevsk Raion
- Hromada: Kadiivka urban hromada
- Founded: 1814

Area
  - Total: 91.81 km^{2} (35.45 sq mi)
- Elevation: 251 m (823 ft)

Population (2019)
  - Total: 74,546
  - Density: 812.0/km^{2} (2,103/sq mi)
- Time zone: UTC+2 (EET)
  - Summer (DST): UTC+3 (EEST)
- Postal code: 940ХХ
- Area code: +380 06435
- Climate: Dfb

Kadiivka (Ukrainian: Кадіївка) or Stakhanov (Russian: Стаханов), is a city in Alchevsk Raion, Luhansk Oblast, Donbas, eastern Ukraine. Residence of Kadiivka urban hromada. It is located on the Komyshuvakha River, a right tributary of the Luhan. On the decision of the Verkhovna Rada (Ukrainian parliament) the city was renamed back to Kadiivka in 2016. However, due to the Russian occupation of eastern Ukraine since early 2014, the Russian administration has kept the 1978 Soviet name of the city.

Following their 2022 annexation referendum, Russia claimed the entire Luhansk Oblast, including Stakhanov (Kadiivka), as part of their Lugansk People's Republic (LPR / LNR). Kadiivka's population is approximately 73,248 (2022 estimate). Russia maintains the name Stakhanov, after the famous Soviet miner Alexei Stakhanov, and all city signage remains in the name of Stakhanov.

== History ==
=== Origins and name ===
Kadiivka has its origins in the mid-19th century in the settlement of Shubynka, when coal mining was developing in the region. It became known as Kadiivka (Ukrainian: Кадіївка; Russian: Кадиевка, romanized: Kadiyevka) in 1898. The city was briefly renamed Serho, after Bolshevik leader Sergo Ordzhonikidze (Ukrainian: Серго) between 1937 and 1940, before returning to the name Kadiivka from 1940 to 1978. On 15 February 1978, the city was renamed Stakhanov (Ukrainian: Стаханов; Russian: Стаханов) after the famous Soviet miner Alexei Stakhanov, who started his career there. On 12 May 2016, Ukraine's Verkhovna Rada voted to change its name back to Kadiivka as a result of decommunization laws; however, as the Luhansk People's Republic, who control the city, have not recognized this decision and maintain the name Stakhanov, the name change has only had a symbolic, and political meaning.

=== Ukrainian Soviet Union to Ukraine ===
The city was part of the Ukrainian Soviet Socialist Republic from its founding in 1922. In January 1928, the town became the center of Kadiivka Raion. A local newspaper has been published in the settlement since September 1930. In 1919, the population of the city was 38,000. Kadiivka received city status in 1932. In April 1932, the Kadiivka Raion was, along with five other raions, restructured into Kadiivka Municipality. By 1940, the population of Kadiivka had risen to 95,000.

During the Second World War, the city was occupied by German troops from July 1942 until September 1943. A Soviet labor camp for German prisoners of war operated at Kadiivka during the Second World War. In November 1944, three districts (city district councils) were created: Illichivskyi, Bryanskyi, and Golubivskyi. In the 1950s, the city encompassed settlements that were later separated into separate cities - Brianka, Pervomaisk, and Kirovsk.

The city was renamed in 1978 in honor of Alexei Stakhanov, a Soviet coal miner famous for purportedly setting a new record of coal mining output using his own innovative working methods and inspiring the Stakhanovite movement.

The city was incorporated by Ukraine as a city of oblast significance. With the fall of the Soviet Union, in 1991, then Stakhanov became part of independent Ukraine. In the 32 years, from 1991, to 2013, Stakhanov would experience a sharp population fall, from 112,700 in 1991, to 77,593 in 2013.

=== 2014–2022 ===
From April 2014, pro-Russia separatists started taking over parts of the south and east of Ukraine. In April and early May 2014, Luhansk and the surrounding area, including Kadiivka, was taken over by Russian-backed forces of the self-proclaimed Luhansk People's Republic (LPR / LNR). The Ukrainian Government launched their Anti-Terrorist Operation in mid-April 2014, with the aim of taking back all territories under separatist control. In May, the 2014 Donbass status "referendums" were held. The "referendums" returned an overwhelming majority vote to cede from Ukraine into the Donetsk and Lugansk People's Republics, however they were condemned by the west, and did not obtain international recognition.

In autumn 2014, with separatist leader Pavel Dremov controlling Kadiivka, there was talk of the area being a breakaway 'Cossack Republic' within the breakaway Luhansk People's Republic. While remaining a part of the LPR, Dremov and his militia were among the most outspoken against LPR authorities. Any possibility of a breakaway 'Cossack Republic' ended with Dremov's death in a car explosion in late 2015.

In October 2015, the OSCE Special Monitoring Mission to Ukraine opened a Forward Patrol Base in the city, meaning that a small number of OSCE international monitors were based full-time in the city. From 2016 until 2022, Stakhanov was not an active scene of war. The OSCE left the city shortly before the 2022 Russian invasion of Ukraine began.

=== 2022–present ===
Following the Russian invasion of Ukraine, in February 2022, Kadiivka has been a significant, although not central location. In 2022, Russia's Wagner Group were reported to have significant bases in Kadiivka, and these were repeatedly targeted by Ukrainian strikes.

== Economy and education ==
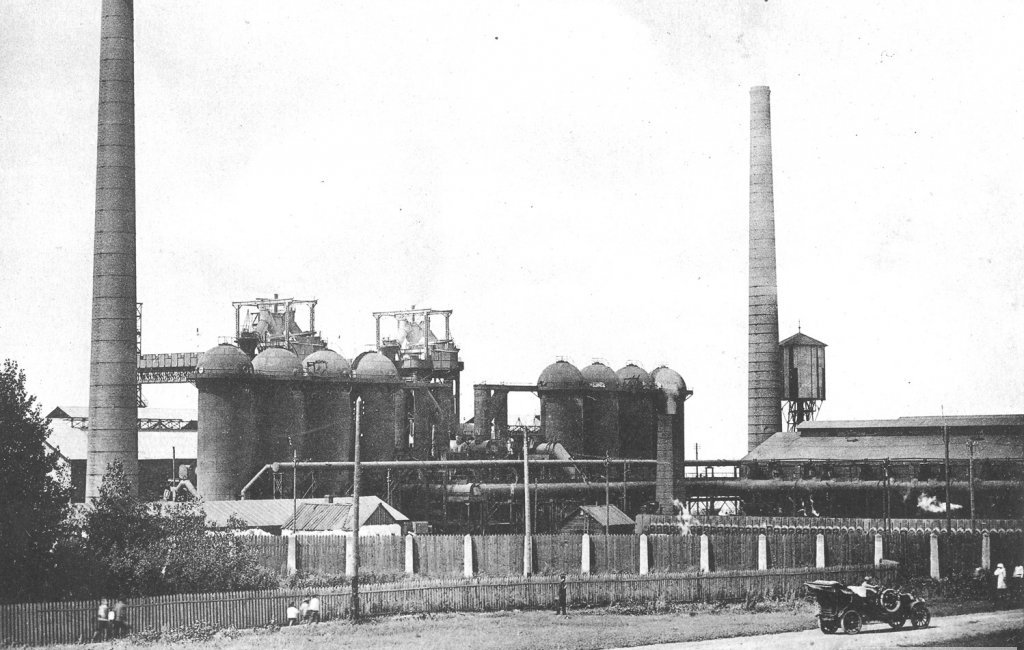
A metallurgical plant in Kadiivka, pictured in the early 1900s

In Soviet times, the city was an important industrial centre. In 1984, there were four coal mines, a processing plant, a machine-building plant, a car building plant, the Stakhanov Railway Car Building Works, an ore repair plant, the Stakhanov Coke Plant, a rubber products plant, a carbon black plant, the Stakhanov Ferroalloy Plant, the Stakhanovsky Yunost Mechanical Plant, the Stakhanovsky Experimental Mechanical Plant, a sewing factory, a meat processing plant, a refrigerating plant, and a dairy.

In 1985, in the Soviet Union, the city was awarded the Order of the Red Banner of Labour. Kadiivka's economy has been severely affected by ongoing war, and it is unclear what is still operational. In 2016, Vice described the city as a 'depressed mining town'.

There is a branch of the Kommunarsky Mining and Metallurgical Institute, an evening engineering college, a mining college, a medical school, a pedagogical college, seven vocational schools, 24 secondary schools, 17 medical institutions, a children's sanatorium.

=== Sports and culture ===
Stakhanov has a Palace of Culture, 75 libraries, 10 clubs, two cinemas, a historical and art museum, and a mining museum named after Vladimir Lenin. There are three sports stadiums in the city (Pobeda, Yunost, and Vagonostroitel), and the Dolphin swimming pool.

The Bulgarian politician Grisha Filipov (1919–1994) was born in Kadiivka.

== Geography ==
Kadiivka is situated between the cities of Pervomaisk, to its north, and Alchevsk, to the south. The area around is traditionally known for mining, and richness of natural resources.

=== City municipality ===
The municipality of Kadiivka also includes two other cities, in the nearby area -

- Almazna
- Irmino

=== Transport ===
The city formerly had both trams and trolleybuses. Tram traffic opened on February 15, 1937. The number of trams dwindled over the years before the trams stopped running in 2007. The trolleybuses stopped running in 2011.

== Demographics ==
Historical population
Year	Pop.	±%
1926	17,837	—
1939	67,974	+281.1%
1959	180,205	+165.1%
1970	137,138	−23.9%
1979	108,043	−21.2%
1989	112,023	+3.7%
2001	90,152	−19.5%
2011	79,010	−12.4%
2022	73,248	−7.3%

As per the Ukrainian Census of 2001, the ethnicity of Kadiivka was: Ukrainians: 46.1%, Russians: 50.1%, Belarusians: 1%, Other: 2.9%. The languages spoken were: Russian: 85.3%, Ukrainian: 13.0%, Belarusian: 0.1%, Armenian: 0.1%.
