= Kirovsk, Luhansk Oblast =

City in Luhansk Oblast, Ukraine

Holubivka Голубівка
- City
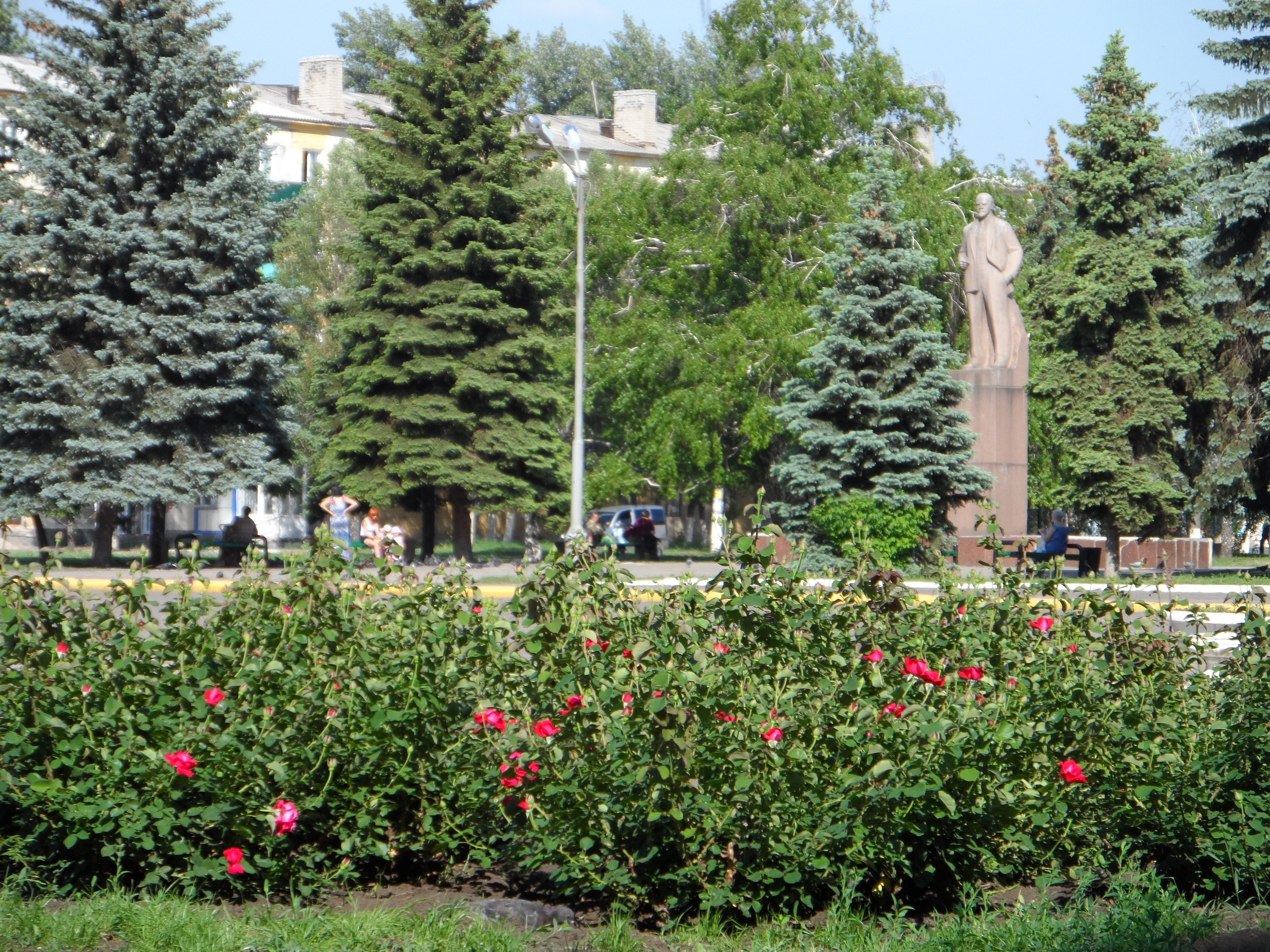
- Small park

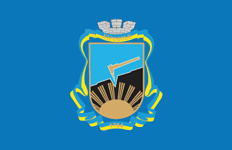
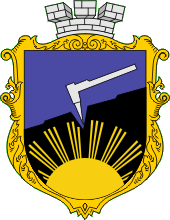
- Flag Seal
- Interactive map of Holubivka
- Location within Luhansk Oblast Location within Ukraine
- Coordinates: 48°38′15″N 38°38′36″E
- Country: Ukraine
- Oblast: Luhansk Oblast
- Raion: Alchevsk Raion
- Hromada: Kadiivka urban hromada
- Founded: 1764
- City status: 1962

Area
  - Total: 3,496 km^{2} (1,350 sq mi)
- Elevation: 189 m (620 ft)

Population (2022)
  - Total: 26,654
- Climate: Dfb

Kirovsk (Ukrainian: Кіровськ; Russian: Кировск) or Holubivka (Ukrainian: Голубівка; Russian: Голубовка, romanized: Golubovka) is a city in Kadiivka urban hromada, Alchevsk Raion (district), Luhansk Oblast (region), Ukraine. It is incorporated as a city of oblast significance. Population: 26,654 (2022 estimate); 28,529 (2013 est.). It has been occupied by Russia and its proxy the Luhansk People's Republic since 2014.

== Geography ==
Kirovsk is located on the Luhan river. The landscape around the town is notable for pyramid-shaped manmade hills, by-products of the coal mining industry.

== History ==
The settlement was founded in 1764 as a village named Holubivka by the Russian colonel Peter Golub. Coal was discovered in the area in the 1830s. When coal mines were developed in the area, the village became known as Holubivskyi Rudnyk (Ukrainian: Голубівський Рудник).

During World War II, Holubivskyi Rudnyk was occupied by Nazi Germany from 12 July 1942 to 3 September 1943. After the area was recaptured from Nazi Germany, in September 1944 the mining settlement was incorporated into Kadiivka as the Holubivskyi District. In 1962, Holubivskyi District was made an independent city, named Kirovsk.

In 2014, Kirovsk was captured by the Luhansk People's Republic, an unrecognized breakaway state.

The city was renamed back to Holubivka by Ukrainian authorities in 2016; however, as the settlement was under the control of the Luhansk People's Republic, who did not recognise this, the renaming has been largely symbolic.

== Demographics ==
As of the 2001 Ukrainian census:

Ethnicity

- Ukrainians: 56.9%
- Russians: 40.7%
- Belarusians: 1%

Language

- Russian: 84.6%
- Ukrainian: 14.9%
- Belarusian: 0.2%

== Government ==
The Kirovsk Municipality represented by the Kirovsk City council consists of two urban settlements (towns, Donetskyi and Krynychanske) and two rural settlements (hamlets, Krynychne and Tavrychanske) that belonged to Chervonohvardiiske Municipality.

== Notable people ==
- Maksym Dehtyarov (born 1993), Ukrainian professional football player of the club Desna Chernihiv in Ukrainian Premier League.
- Oleh Naumenko (born 1986), Ukrainian paralympic fencer
- Vadym Plotnykov (born 1968), Ukrainian football player
