= Irmino =

City in Luhansk Oblast, Ukraine

Irmino Ірміно
- City
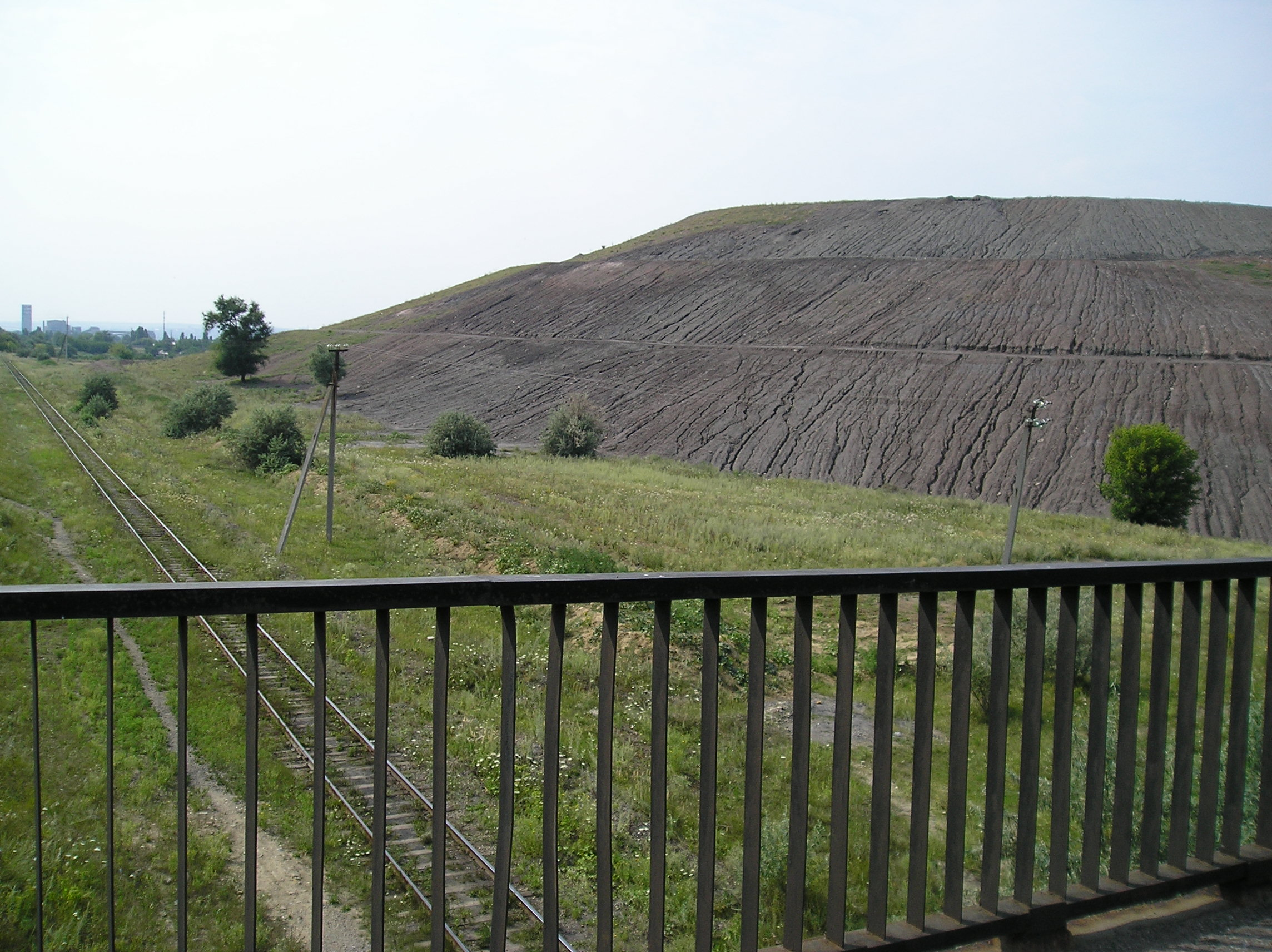
- Irmino mine slag heap

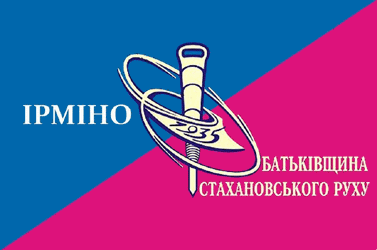
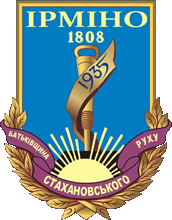
- Flag Coat of arms
- Interactive map of Irmino
- Location within Luhansk Oblast Location within Ukraine
- Coordinates: 48°35′48″N 38°34′58″E
- Country: Ukraine
- Oblast: Luhansk Oblast
- Raion: Alchevsk Raion
- Hromada: Kadiivka urban hromada
- Founded: 1808

Population (2022)
  - Total: 9,270
- Area code: (+380)
- Vehicle registration: BB / 13
- Climate: Dfb

Irmino (Ukrainian: Ірміно) is a city in Kadiivka urban hromada, Alchevsk Raion (district), Luhansk Oblast (region), Ukraine. Irmino is located 55 km west of Luhansk. It is part of the agglomeration Alchevsk-Kadiivka, in Donbas. It is located on the banks of the river Luhan. The population is 9,270 (2022 estimate), 10,044 (2013 est.).

Since the War in Donbas began in 2014, Irmino has been under the control of the Luhansk People's Republic. Following the 2022 annexation referendums in Russian-occupied Ukraine, the Luhansk People's Republic became a federal subject of Russia.

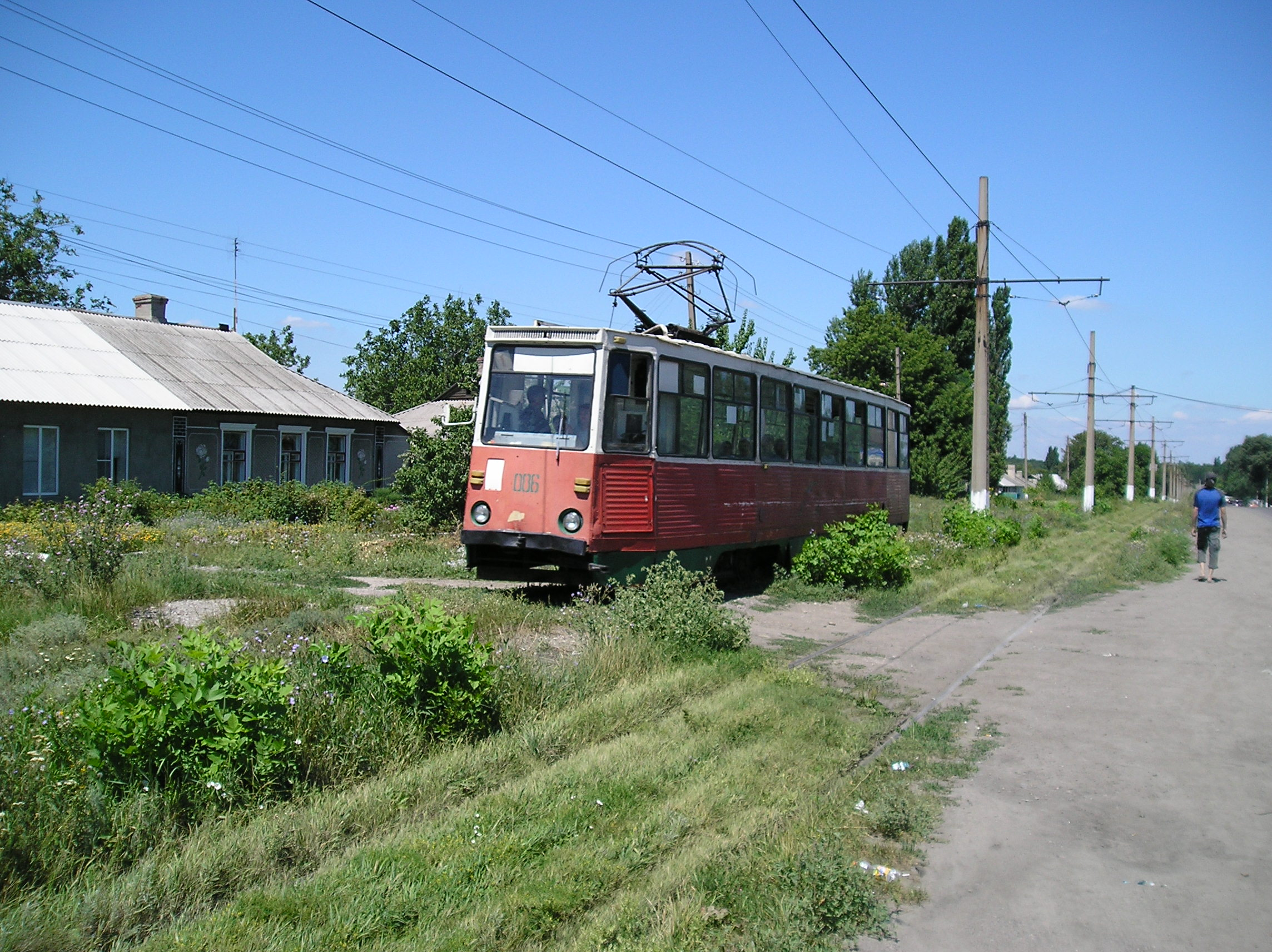
Sole tramcar on the Kadiivka-Irmino line

== History ==
Irmino was the first village of Petrovka/Petrivka (Петрівка) founded in 1808 on the right bank of the Luhan by peasants from the Poltava region and renamed Irminka in 1898, and later Irmyne (Ukrainian: Ірмине) or Irmino (Russian: Ирмино) around 1910, after the coal mine named after Irma, daughter of the mine owner.

It was in Irmino, at the “Tsentralna-Irmino” mine, where Alexei Stakhanov had been working since 1927, that the legendary miner reportedly managed to extract 102 t (100 long tons; 112 short tons) of coal, i.e. 14 times the norm, on the night of 30–31 August 1935. At the time, the village of Irmino depended on Kadiivka, and Stakhanov's registration would have been made at the Tsentralna-Irmino mine in Kadiivka.

In 1936, the village achieved city status and took on the name Teplohirsk (Ukrainian: Теплогірськ) in 1977. On 8 July 2010 the town was renamed Irmino after a local referendum. The name Irmino is based on the Russian language and does not conform with the norms of the Ukrainian language.

== Name ==
- 1808–1900 — Petrivka,
- 1900–1962 — Irmyne/Irmino,
- 1977–2010 — Teplohirsk,
- since 2010 — Irmino

== Demographics ==
- 1923 - 2,794
- 1926 - 5,276
- 1939 - 15,327
- 1959 - 21,512
- 1979 - 19,090
- 1989 - 18,549
- 2001 - 13,053
- 2012 - 10,200
- 2013 - 10,044
- 2014 - 9,886
- 2015 - 9,764
- 2016 - 9,687
- 2021 - 9,343

== Transport ==
Irmino is 116 km from Luhansk by rail and 75 km by road.
