= Donetskyi =

Urban locality in Luhansk Oblast, Ukraine

Donetskyi Донецький
- Rural settlement
- Location of Donetskyi within Ukraine Donetskyi (Luhansk Oblast)
- Coordinates: 48.7°N 38.673056°E
- Country: Ukraine
- Oblast: Luhansk Oblast
- Raion: Alchevsk Raion
- Hromada: Kadiivka urban hromada
- Founded: 1904
- Status: 1963

Area
  - Total: 5.35 km^{2} (2.07 sq mi)
- Elevation: 158 m (518 ft)

Population (2022)
  - Total: 3,490
  - Density: 652/km^{2} (1,690/sq mi)
- Time zone: UTC+2 (EET)
  - Summer (DST): UTC+3 (EEST)
- Postal code: 93890
- Area code: +380 6446

Donetskyi (Ukrainian: Донецький; Russian: Донецкий) is a rural settlement in Kadiivka urban hromada, Alchevsk Raion (district), Luhansk Oblast (region), Ukraine, at about 50 km WNW from the centre of Luhansk city, on the right bank of the Luhan. Population: 3,490 (2022 estimate).

It is part of the Kirovsk Municipality.
