= Krynychanske =

Urban locality in Luhansk Oblast, Ukraine

Krynychanske Криничанське
- Rural settlement
- Interactive map of Krynychanske
- Location of Chervonohvardiiske Krynychanske (Ukraine)
- Coordinates: 48°35′41″N 38°45′15″E
- Country: Ukraine
- Oblast: Luhansk Oblast
- Raion: Alchevsk Raion
- Hromada: Kadiivka urban hromada
- Founded: 1948
- Elevation: 283 m (928 ft)

Population (2022)
  - Total: 1,323
- Postal code: 93892
- Area code: +380 6446

Krynychanske (Note: Ukrainian: Криничанське; Russian: Криничанское, romanized: Krinichanskoye) or Chervonohvardiiske (Note: Ukrainian: Червоногвардійське; Russian: Червоногвардейское, romanized: Chervonogvardeyskoye) is a rural settlement in Kadiivka urban hromada, Alchevsk Raion (district), Luhansk Oblast (region), Ukraine. Population: 1,323 (2022 estimate)

== Geography ==
Chervonohvardiiske is located 13 kilometres (8.1 mi) from Kirovsk, Luhansk Oblast, and 10 kilometres (6.2 mi) from the railway station at Sentianivka.

== History ==
The settlement was founded as Krynychanske in 1948 in connection with the "Krynychanska-Pivdenna" coal mine. It was subordinated to the nearby city Kirovsk. In 1953, Krynychanske was renamed to Krasnohvardeisk. (Note: Ukrainian: Красногвардейськ; Russian: Красногвардейское, romanized: Krasnogvardeyskoye) In 1965, it was renamed again, to Chervonohvardiiske.

During the war in Donbas, Chervonohvardiiske was taken over by the Luhansk People's Republic (LPR), an unrecognized breakaway state widely described as a Russian puppet state. In 2016, though it was still occupied by the LPR, the city was renamed Krynychanske by the Ukrainian government as part of decommunization in Ukraine.

On 12 June 2020, in accordance with nationwide administrative reforms, Krynychanske, along with all other settlements subordinated to the Kirovsk city council, (Note: In the legal documents, the council is alternatively referred to as Holubivka city council, after the official Ukrainian name for the city.) was nominally assigned to Kadiivka urban hromada by the Ukrainian government. On 17 July the same year, Kadiivka urban hromada was reassigned to the newly created Alchevsk Raion.

== Economy ==
According to official Soviet-era sources, the average daily output of the Krynychanska-Pivdenna coal mine, located in the town, was 650 tons of coal. The Luhansk Winery is also located in the town.
