= Kalynove =

Urban locality in Luhansk Oblast, Ukraine

Kalynove Калинове
- Rural settlement
- Interactive map of Kalynove
- Location of Kalynove within Ukraine Kalynove (Ukraine)
- Coordinates: 48.541944°N 38.498333°E
- Country: Ukraine
- Oblast: Luhansk Oblast
- Raion: Alchevsk Raion
- Hromada: Kadiivka urban hromada
- Founded: 1720

Area
  - Total: 26.33 km^{2} (10.17 sq mi)
- Elevation: 240 m (790 ft)

Population (2022)
  - Total: 2,926
  - Density: 111.1/km^{2} (287.8/sq mi)
- Time zone: UTC+2 (EET)
  - Summer (DST): UTC+3 (EEST)
- Postal code: 93350
- Area code: +380 6474

Kalynove (Ukrainian: Калинове; Russian: Калиново) is a rural settlement in Kadiivka urban hromada, Alchevsk Raion (district), Luhansk Oblast (region), Ukraine, at about 62 km WSW from the centre of Luhansk city. Population: 2,926 (2022 estimate).

Kalynove stands on the Luhan river. In Soviet times it belonged to the Popasna Raion. The settlement was taken under control of pro-Russian forces during the War in Donbass, that started in 2014.

== Demographics ==
In 2001 the settlement had 3,862 inhabitants, native language distribution as of the Ukrainian Census of 2001:

Native languages in Kalynove
| | percent |
| Ukrainian | 80.99% |
| Russian | 18.49% |
| others | 0.52% |
