= Molodizhne, Alchevsk Raion, Luhansk Oblast =

Molodizhne Молодіжне
- Rural settlement
- Interactive map of Molodizhne
- Location of Molodizhne within Ukraine Molodizhne (Ukraine)
- Coordinates: 48.641667°N 38.475556°E
- Country: Ukraine
- Oblast: Luhansk Oblast
- Raion: Alchevsk Raion
- Hromada: Kadiivka urban hromada
- Founded: 1974

Area
  - Total: 0.736 km^{2} (0.284 sq mi)
- Elevation: 240 m (790 ft)

Population (2001 census)
  - Total: 367
  - Density: 499/km^{2} (1,290/sq mi)
- Time zone: UTC+2 (EET)
  - Summer (DST): UTC+3 (EEST)
- Postal code: 93344
- Area code: +380 6474

Molodizhne (Ukrainian: Молодіжне; Russian: Молодёжное) is a rural settlement in Kadiivka urban hromada, Alchevsk Raion (district), Luhansk Oblast (region), Ukraine, at about 65 km WNW from the centre of Luhansk city.

The settlement was taken under control of pro-Russian forces during the War in Donbass, that started in 2014.

== Demographics ==
In 2001 the settlement had 367 inhabitants. Native language distribution as of the Ukrainian Census of 2001:

- Ukrainian: 13.62%
- Russian: 86.38%
