= Lomuvatka =

Urban locality in Luhansk Oblast, Ukraine

Lomuvatka Ломуватка
- Rural settlement
- Location of Lomuvatka within Luhansk Oblast#Location of Lomuvatka within Ukraine Lomuvatka (Ukraine)
- Coordinates: 48°27′13″N 38°33′26″E
- Country: Ukraine
- Oblast: Luhansk Oblast
- Raion: Alchevsk Raion
- Hromada: Kadiivka urban hromada
- Elevation: 298 m (978 ft)

Population (2022)
  - Total: 881
- Time zone: UTC+2 (EET)
  - Summer (DST): UTC+3 (EEST)
- Postal code: 94195
- Area code: +380 6443

Lomuvatka (Ukrainian: Ломуватка) is a rural settlement in Kadiivka urban hromada, Alchevsk Raion (district), Luhansk Oblast (region), Ukraine. Population: 881 (2022 estimate)

== Demographics ==
Native language distribution as of the Ukrainian Census of 2001:

- Ukrainian: 78.67%
- Russian: 21.33%
