= Brianka =

Brianka Брянка
- City
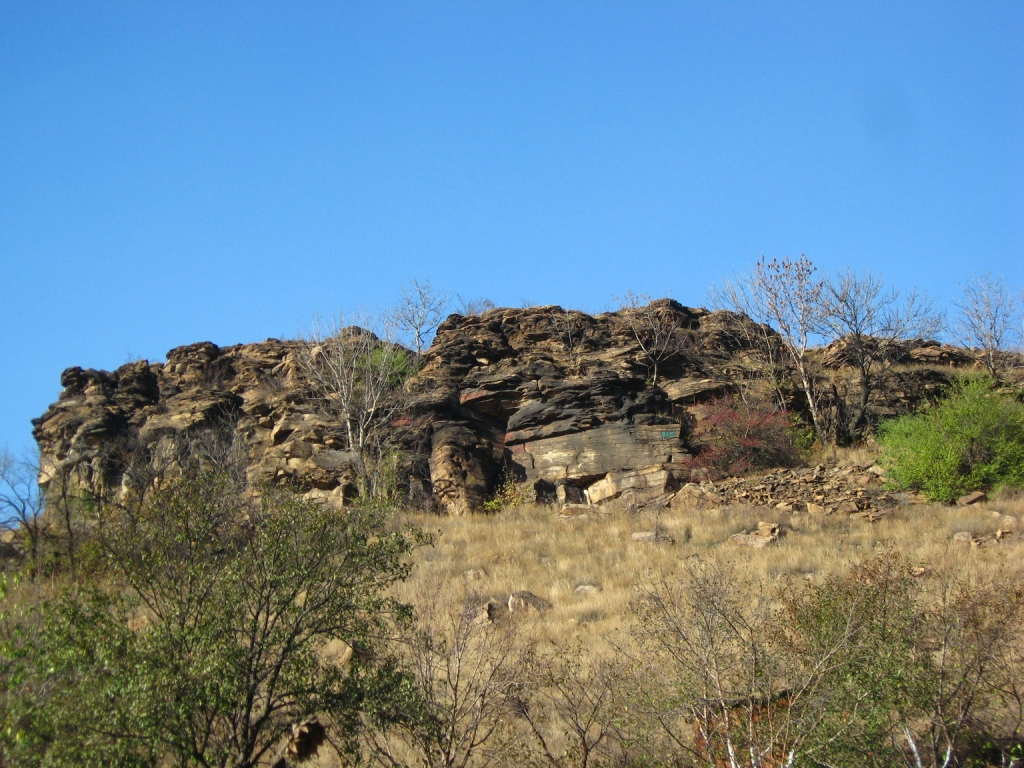
- Maryin cliff

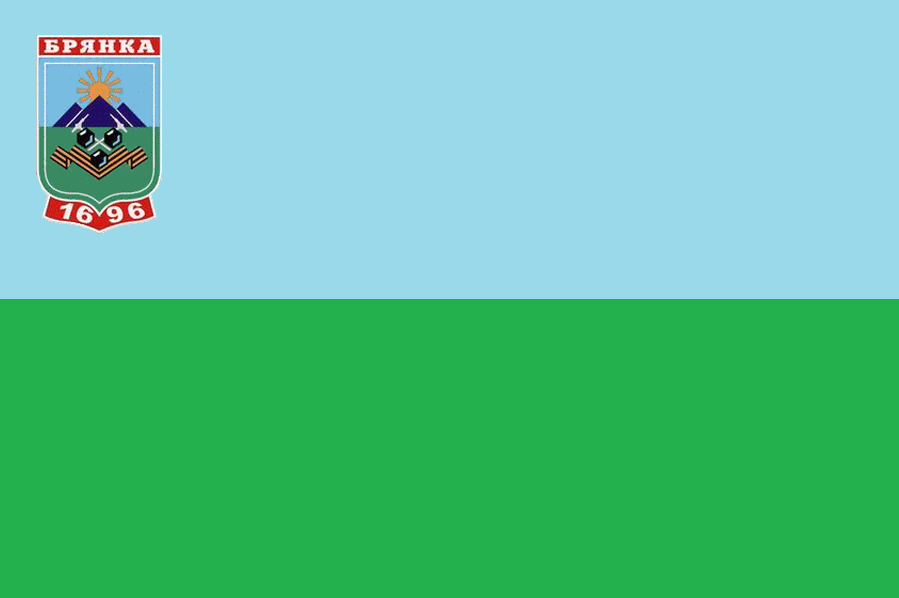
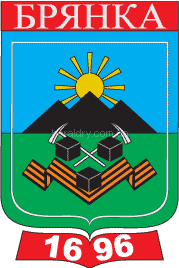
- Flag Coat of arms
- Interactive map of Brianka
- Location within Luhansk Oblast Location within Ukraine
- Coordinates: 48°30′48″N 38°38′35″E
- Country: Ukraine
- Oblast: Luhansk Oblast
- Raion: Alchevsk Raion
- Hromada: Kadiivka urban hromada
- Founded: 1696
- City status since: 1962

Government
  - Body: Bryankivska City Council (Ukrainian: Брянківська міська рада)

Area
  - Total: 635 km^{2} (245 sq mi)
- Elevation: 183 m (600 ft)

Population (2022)
  - Total: 44,760
- Demonym: Bryankivska
- Climate: Dfb
- Website: Bryankovsky city council

Brianka (Ukrainian: Брянка, Russian: Брянка, romanized: Bryanka) is a city in Kadiivka urban hromada, Alchevsk Raion (district), Luhansk Oblast (region), Ukraine. It is located in the Donbas region, between the cities of Kadiivka and Alchevsk. Brianka is incorporated as a city of oblast significance. The population: 44,760 (2022 estimate), 47,512 (2013 est.).

Since 2014, Bryanka has been under the control of the Russian-backed Luhansk People's Republic (LPR/LNR). In 2022, Russia declared its annexation of the region.

== History ==
The settlement traces its history to small settlements of Zaporizhian Cossacks, zymivnyky, that appeared in place of future Brianka in 1696.

The settlement developed further into a miners' settlement around the local Brianka Quarry since the end of 19th century. After the World War II, in 1944–1962 it was a suburb of neighboring city of Kadiivka. Brianka became a city in its own right in 1962. A local newspaper has been published in the city since April 1965.

During the Russian invasion of Ukraine reports have emerged about Russian soldiers who refused to continue fighting being held captive in the city.

== Demographics ==
=== Population ===
As of 2021, the population is 44,987 people.

Historical population
Year	Pop.	±%
1959	7,600	—
1989	64,800	+752.6%
1991	64,000	−1.2%
2017	46,040	−28.1%
2021	44,987	−2.3%

=== Ethnicity ===
As of the Ukrainian Census of 2001:

- Ukrainians: 54.9%
- Russians: 42.7%
- Belarusians: 0.8%

=== Language ===
As of the Ukrainian Census of 2001:

- Russian: 87.01%
- Ukrainian: 12.65%
- Belarusian: 0.09%

== Notable people ==
- Heorhiy Sudakov (born 2002), Ukrainian footballer, former Shakhtar Donetsk player, currently plays for Benfica, with also obtaining the call up from the Ukrainian national team.
- Kostyantyn Morozov (born 1944), Ukrainian politician

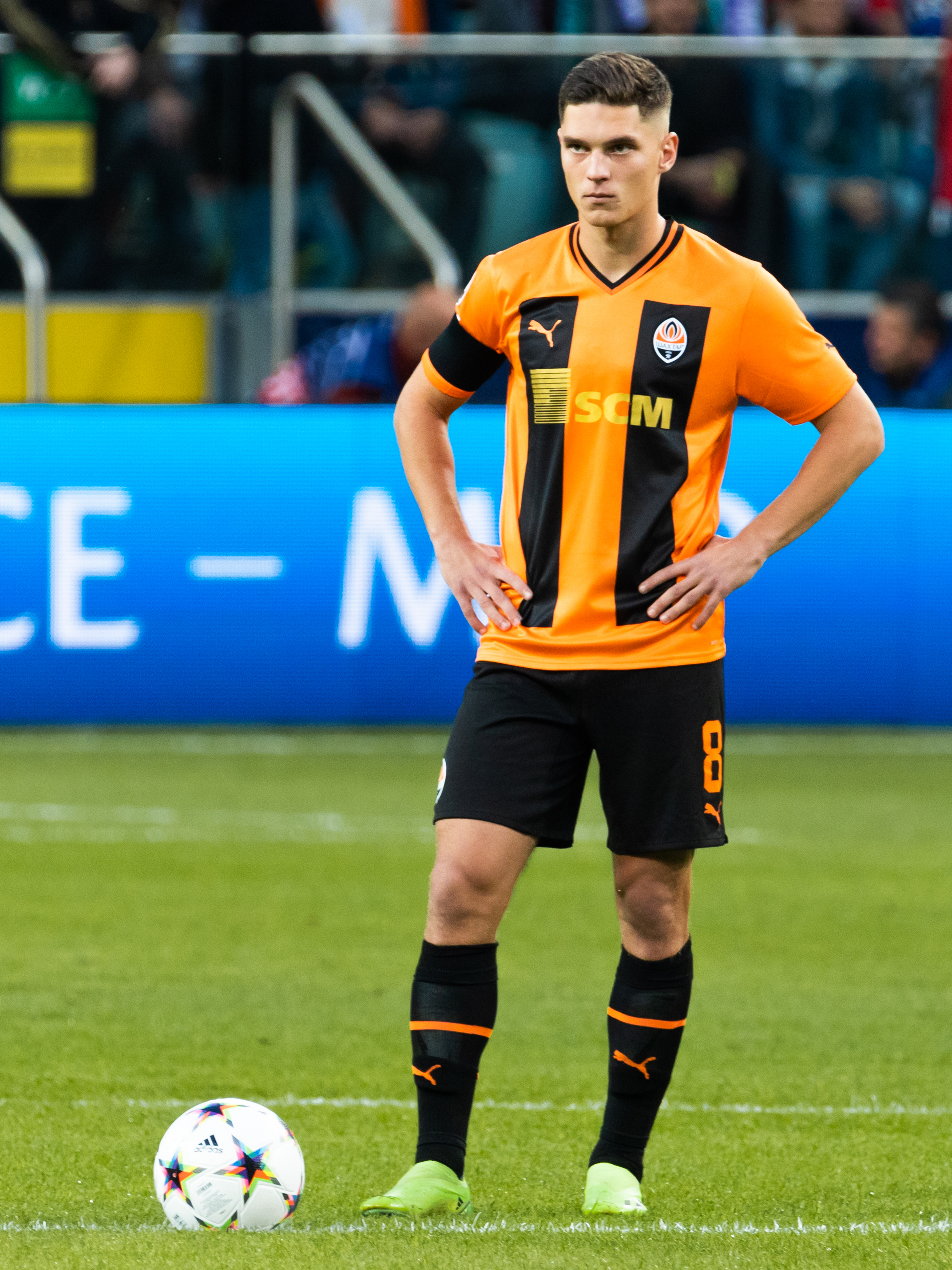
Heorhiy Sudakov in Shakhtar Donetsk
