= Yuzhna Lomuvatka =

Urban locality in Luhansk Oblast, Ukraine

Yuzhna Lomuvatka Южна Ломуватка
- Rural settlement
- Location of Yuzhna Lomuvatka within Luhansk Oblast Location of Yuzhna Lomuvatka within Ukraine
- Coordinates: 48°26′15″N 38°31′52″E
- Country: Ukraine
- Oblast: Luhansk Oblast
- Raion: Alchevsk Raion
- Hromada: Kadiivka urban hromada
- Founded: 1953
- Elevation: 318 m (1,043 ft)

Population (2022)
  - Total: 3,310
- Time zone: UTC+2 (EET)
  - Summer (DST): UTC+3 (EEST)
- Postal code: 94194
- Area code: +380 6443

Yuzhna Lomuvatka (Ukrainian: Южна Ломуватка) is a rural settlement in Kadiivka urban hromada, Alchevsk Raion (district), Luhansk Oblast (region), Ukraine. Population: 3,310 (2022 estimate)

== Demographics ==
Native language distribution as of the Ukrainian Census of 2001:

- Ukrainian: 9.15%
- Russian: 90.73%
- Others: 0.06%
