= Sentianivka =

Sentianivka Сентянівка
- Rural settlement
- Interactive map of Sentianivka
- Location of Sentianivka within Ukraine Sentianivka (Ukraine)
- Coordinates: 48.675833°N 38.765°E
- Country: Ukraine
- Oblast: Luhansk Oblast
- Raion: Alchevsk Raion
- Hromada: Kadiivka urban hromada
- Founded: 1867
- Elevation: 66 m (217 ft)

Population (2022)
  - Total: 3,140
- Time zone: UTC+2 (EET)
  - Summer (DST): UTC+3 (EEST)
- Postal code: 93720
- Area code: +380 6473

Sentianivka (Ukrainian: Сентянівка; Russian: Сентяновка), known as Frunze (Ukrainian: Фрунзе) from 1930 to 2016, is a rural settlement in Kadiivka urban hromada, Alchevsk Raion (district), Luhansk Oblast (region), Ukraine, at about 43 km WNW from the centre of Luhansk city, on the banks of the Luhan River. Population: 3,140 (2022 estimate)

== History ==
=== 19th and 20th century ===
The origins of Sentianivka go back to the 1860s-1880s in the Russian Empire, when three villages named Sentianivka, Novoselivka, and Krasnohorivka were founded on the lands of a retired military officer with the surname Sentianin, who had served in the Bakhmut hussar regiment. In 1901, there were riots in Sentianivka against mistreatment by a landlord. Rioters burned down a brick factory and granaries. Cossack authorities suppressed the rebellion. A railway station was built in Sentianivka in 1908-1910.

In 1930, during the times of the Soviet Union, Sentianivka, Novoselivka, and Krasnohorivka - in addition to another village named Taisivka and a number of hamlets - were united into a new urban-type settlement named Frunze, in honor of the communist revolutionary Mikhail Frunze.

Frunze was temporarily occupied by Nazi Germany during World War II. The citizens waged partisan warfare against the Nazis.

=== 21st century ===
Frunze was taken under control of pro-Russian forces during the war in Donbas that started in mid-April 2014.

During the decommunization in Ukraine that began after the 2014 Revolution of Dignity, the Ukrainian parliament attempted to return the historical name of the village, Sentianivka. However, due to a clerical error, the initial law actually renamed the town to Sentiakivka. This was quickly fixed in an amendment, officially returning the historical name to Sentianivka.

== Demographics ==
In 2001 the settlement had 3,752 inhabitants. Native language as of the Ukrainian Census of 2001:

- Ukrainian — 61.0+%
- Russian — 37.87%
- Others — 1.04%
