= Hannivka =

Hannivka (Ukrainian: Ганнівка) may refer to several places in Ukraine:

== Dnipropetrovsk Oblast ==
- Hannivka, Kamianske Raion, Dnipropetrovsk Oblast, village in Kamianske Raion
- Hannivka, Kryvyi Rih Raion, Dnipropetrovsk Oblast, village in Kryvyi Rih Raion
- Hannivka, Novomoskovsk Raion, Dnipropetrovsk Oblast, village in Novomoskovsk Raion
- Hannivka, Nikopol Raion, Dnipropetrovsk Oblast, village in Nikopol Raion

== Donetsk Oblast ==
- Hannivka, Dobropillia urban hromada, Pokrovsk Raion, Donetsk Oblast, village in Pokrovsk Raion
- Hannivka, Marinka urban hromada, Pokrovsk Raion, Donetsk Oblast, village in Pokrovsk Raion

== Luhansk Oblast ==
- Hannivka, Alchevsk Raion, Luhansk Oblast, urban-type settlement in Alchevsk Raion
- Hannivka, Rovenky Raion, Luhansk Oblast, village in Rovenky Raion
- Hannivka, Starobilsk Raion, Luhansk Oblast, village in Starobilsk Raion

== Poltava Oblast ==
- Hannivka, Hradyzk settlement hromada, Kremenchuk Raion, Poltava Oblast, village in Kremenchuk Raion
- Hannivka, Kozelshchyna settlement hromada, Kremenchuk Raion, Poltava Oblast, village in Kremenchuk Raion

== Rivne Oblast ==
- Hannivka, Derazhne rural hromada, Rivne Raion, Rivne Oblast, village in Rivne Raion
- Hannivka, Korets urban hromada, Rivne Raion, Rivne Oblast, village in Rivne Raion

== Zaporizhzhia Oblast ==
- Hannivka, Novovasylivka settlement hromada, Melitopol Raion, Zaporizhzhia Oblast, village in Melitopol Raion
- Hannivka, Yakymivka settlement hromada, Melitopol Raion, Zaporizhzhia Oblast, village in Melitopol Raion

== Zhytomyr Oblast ==
- Hannivka, Korosten Raion, Zhytomyr Oblast, village in Korosten Raion
- Hannivka, Zviahel Raion, Zhytomyr Oblast, village in Zviahel Raion
