= Hlybokyi =

Urban locality in Luhansk Oblast, Ukraine

Hlybokyi Глибокий
- Rural settlement
- Location of Hlybokyi within Luhansk Oblast Location of Hlybokyi within Ukraine
- Coordinates: 48°28′31″N 38°35′11″E
- Country: Ukraine
- Oblast: Luhansk Oblast
- Raion: Alchevsk Raion
- Hromada: Kadiivka urban hromada
- Elevation: 285 m (935 ft)

Population (2022)
  - Total: 210
- Time zone: UTC+2 (EET)
  - Summer (DST): UTC+3 (EEST)
- Postal code: 94192
- Area code: +380 6443

Hlybokyi (Ukrainian: Глибокий) is a rural settlement in Kadiivka urban hromada, Alchevsk Raion (district), Luhansk Oblast (region), Ukraine. Population: 210 (2022 estimate)

== Demographics ==
Native language distribution as of the Ukrainian Census of 2001:

- Ukrainian: 5.79%
- Russian: 93.80%
- Others 0.41%
