= City of oblast significance =

City of oblast significance (or importance) is a type of an administrative division in some countries of the former Soviet Union.

- in Russia; see city of federal subject significance
- in Ukraine; see city of regional significance (Ukraine)
