= Novooleksandrivka, Alchevsk Raion, Luhansk Oblast =

Novooleksandrivka Новоолександрівка
- Village
- Location of Novooleksandrivka within Ukraine Novooleksandrivka (Ukraine)
- Coordinates: 48°36′56″N 38°25′42″E
- Country: Ukraine
- Oblast: Luhansk Oblast
- Raion: Alchevsk Raion
- Hromada: Kadiivka urban hromada
- Founded: 1900

Area
  - Total: 2.471 km^{2} (0.954 sq mi)
- Elevation: 173 m (568 ft)

Population (2001 census)
  - Total: 124
  - Density: 50.2/km^{2} (130/sq mi)
- Time zone: UTC+2 (EET)
  - Summer (DST): UTC+3 (EEST)
- Postal code: 93309
- Area code: +380 6474

Novooleksandrivka (Ukrainian: Новоолександрівка; Russian: Новоалександровка) is a village in Kadiivka urban hromada, Alchevsk Raion (district), Luhansk Oblast (region), Ukraine. The village borders in NW with Popasna city.

During the war in Donbas, that started in mid-April 2014, the separation line between the warring parties has been located in the vicinity of the settlement. In January 2018 the Ukrainian military regained control over the village.

== Demographics ==
Native language as of the Ukrainian Census of 2001:

- Ukrainian 93.55%
- Russian 6.45%
