= Verhulivka =

Urban locality in Luhansk Oblast, Ukraine

Verhulivka Вергулівка (Ukrainian) Вергулёвка (Russian) Vergulyovka, Vergulevka
- Rural settlement
- Location of Verhulivka within Luhansk Oblast#Location of Verhulivka within Ukraine Verhulivka (Ukraine)
- Coordinates: 48°23′58″N 38°32′04″E
- Country: Ukraine
- Oblast: Luhansk Oblast
- Raion: Alchevsk Raion
- Hromada: Kadiivka urban hromada
- Founded: 1777
- Elevation: 310 m (1,020 ft)

Population (2022)
  - Total: 1,258
- Time zone: UTC+2 (EET)
  - Summer (DST): UTC+3 (EEST)
- Postal code: 94191
- Area code: +380 6443

Verhulivka (Ukrainian: Вергулівка), also known as Vergulevka or Vergulyovka (Russian: Вергулёвка), is a rural settlement in Kadiivka urban hromada, Alchevsk Raion (district), Luhansk Oblast (region), Ukraine. It has a population of around 1,258 (2022 estimate).

== Demographics ==
Native language distribution as of the Ukrainian Census of 2001:

- Ukrainian: 12.81%
- Russian: 87.12%
- Others 0.07%
