= Almazna =

City in Luhansk Oblast, Ukraine

Almazna Алмазна
- City
- Interactive map of Almazna
- Location within Ukraine Location within Luhansk Oblast
- Coordinates: 48°31′N 38°35′E
- Country: Ukraine
- Oblast: Luhansk Oblast
- Raion: Alchevsk Raion
- Hromada: Kadiivka urban hromada

Population (2022 est.)
  - Total: 4,148
- Demonyms: Almaznyánin; Almazniánka; Almaznyáni; Ukrainian: Aлмазня́нин; Aлмазня́нка; Aлмазня́ни

Almazna (Ukrainian: Алмазна, Russian: Алмазная, romanized: Almaznaya) is a small city in Kadiivka urban hromada, Alchevsk Raion (district), Luhansk Oblast (region), Ukraine. The population of Almazna was estimated to be 4,148 (2022 estimate). Industries within Almazna include metallurgy and manufacturing; a coal mine is also located near the city.

Since 2014, Almazna has been under the effective control of the self-proclaimed Luhansk People's Republic.

== Geography ==
Almazna is situated 65 km away from Luhansk, and 597.9 km away from Kyiv. The city is the source of the river Komyshuvakha, which originates in its eastern part, while the river Lomuvatka flows 1 km west of the city. The railway station Stakhanov (formerly known as Almazna), is located 2 km away from the city.

== Demographics ==
As of the 2001 Ukrainian census, Almazna had a population of 5,099 inhabitants. The absolute majority of the population are Ukrainians, yet a significant minority, which accounts for over 40% of the population claims to have an ethnic Russian background. The exact distribution of the population by ethnicity was as follows:

Ethnic groups in Almazna
	percent
Ukrainians	56.72%
Russians	41.28%
Belarusians	0.86%
Moldovans	0.22%
