= Kadiivka urban hromada =

Kadiivka urban hromada Кадіївська міська громада
- Hromada
- Interactive map of Kadiivka urban hromada
- Country: Ukraine
- Oblast: Luhansk
- Raion: Alchevsk
- Settlements: 35
- Cities: 6
- Villages: 20
- Towns: 9

Kadiivka urban hromada (Ukrainian: Кадіївська міська громада) is a hromada of Ukraine, located in Alchevsk Raion, Luhansk Oblast. Its administrative center is the city Kadiivka.

The hromada contains 35 settlements: 6 cities (Almazna, Brianka, Holubivka, Irmino, Kadiivka, and Pervomaisk), 10 rural settlements (Donetskyi, Hannivka, Hlybokyi, Kalynove, Krynychanske, Lomuvatka, Molodizhne, Sentianivka, Verhulivka, Yuzhna Lomuvatka), and 19 villages:

- Berdianka
- Berezivske
- Bohdanivka
- Veselohorivka
- Vesnyane
- Holubivske
- Dachne
- Zarichne
- Kalynove-Borshchuvate
- Krynychne
- Nadarivka
- Novyi
- Novooleksandrivka
- Olenivka
- Polove
- Stare
- Stepanivka
- Tavrychanske
- Chervonyi Lyman

== See also ==
- List of hromadas of Ukraine
