= Pervomaisk, Luhansk Oblast =

City in Luhansk Oblast, Ukraine

Pervomaisk Сокологірськ
- City
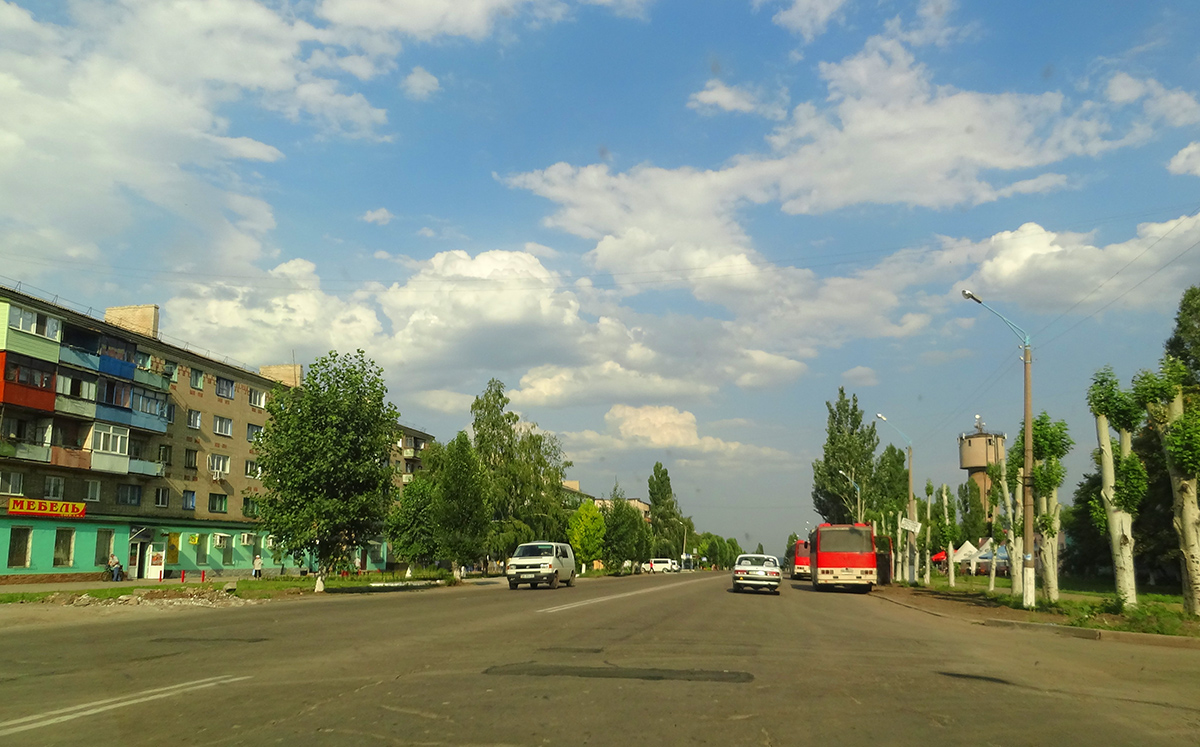
- Central Pervomaisk

- Flag Coat of arms
- Interactive map of Pervomaisk
- Location within Luhansk Oblast Location within Ukraine
- Coordinates: 48°37′47″N 38°33′43″E
- Country: Ukraine
- Oblast: Luhansk Oblast
- Raion: Alchevsk Raion
- Hromada: Kadiivka urban hromada

Area
  - Total: 88.54 km^{2} (34.19 sq mi)
- Elevation: 199 m (653 ft)

Population (2022)
  - Total: 36,091
  - Density: 407.6/km^{2} (1,056/sq mi)
- Time zone: UTC+2
- Postal code: 93200-279
- Area code: +380-6455
- Climate: Dfb
- Website: https://pervomaysklnr.su/

Pervomaisk (Ukrainian: Первомайськ, IPA: [perwɔˈmai̯sʲk]; Russian: Первомайск), also known as Sokolohirsk (Сокологірськ), is a city in Luhansk Oblast, Ukraine, on the left bank of the Luhan River. Pervomaisk is located 71 kilometres (44 mi), by road, from Luhansk, 133 kilometres (83 mi) from Izvaryne, where there is the de jure international border between Ukraine and Russia, and 736 kilometres (457 mi) from the capital Kyiv.

Pervomaisk came under the control of the breakaway Luhansk People's Republic (LPR) in early 2014, following which the city became a focal point of the war in Donbas, sustaining heavy destruction in the conflict. In 2022, Russia declared its annexation of the entirety of Luhansk Oblast, including Pervomaisk, as part of the LPR. The population of Pervomaisk is 36,091 (2022 estimate).

== History ==
=== Founding and early development (1765–1916) ===
The history of the city begins with the village of Aleksandrovka, which was founded in 1765, and from the beginning of the 19th century it was part of the Slavyanoserbsk uezd of the Yekaterinoslav Governorate. In the second half of the 19th century, coal mining began in the settlement; by then, the settlement was named Petro-Maryevka. In 1872, the Petromaryevsky mine was opened and the Petro-Maryevsky Coal Industry Society was created.

=== Soviet era (1917–1990) ===
In November 1917, the city was captured by Soviet forces. In 1920, the settlement was renamed Pervomaisk, in honor of International Workers' Day. In 1930, a local newspaper was established.

In 1932, the first cutting machine was developed and tested by Aleksey Bakhmutsky in Pervomaisk. The first analogue of a tunneling machine was also developed in Pervomaysk by Nikolay Chikhachev. In 1934, the first domestic Soviet tunelling machine was assembled at the repair shops of the Pervomaiskugol trust.

During World War II, on 12 July 1942, the town was occupied by advancing German troops. By November 1942, the Germans had exterminated nearly the entire Jewish population of Pervomaisk. On 3 September 1943, it was liberated by units of the 266th Rifle Division (led by Major General Kornei Rebrikov) of the 32nd Rifle Corps of the 3rd Guards Army of the Southwestern Front during the Donbas strategic offensive.

By 1954, the town's economy was based on coal mining. There was also an electromechanical plant, two evening schools for working youth, five secondary schools, four seven-year schools, two primary schools, six libraries, a cinema, four clubs, and a pioneer house. By 1974, the population reached 45,400 people; in addition, the town now also had a reinforced concrete plant, a shoe factory, a medical school, an evening electromechanical technical school, and a branch of the Kadievka evening mining technical school.

The peak population of 51,025 was reached in January 1989.

=== Independent Ukraine (1991–12013) ===
Pervomaisk remained part of the Ukrainian SSR until its dissolution in 1991, and was from then part of Ukraine. In May 1995, the Government of Ukraine approved a decision on the privatization of the town's housing and communal services department. In 1997, the local branch of the Stakhanov Medical School was transformed into the Pervomaisk Medical School. In September 2012, the Government of Ukraine authorized the privatization of four local coal mines: Pervomaiskaya, Zolotoye, Karbonit, and Toshkovskaya. As of 1 January 2013, the population of Pervomaisk was 38,435.

=== War in Donbas (2014–12021) ===
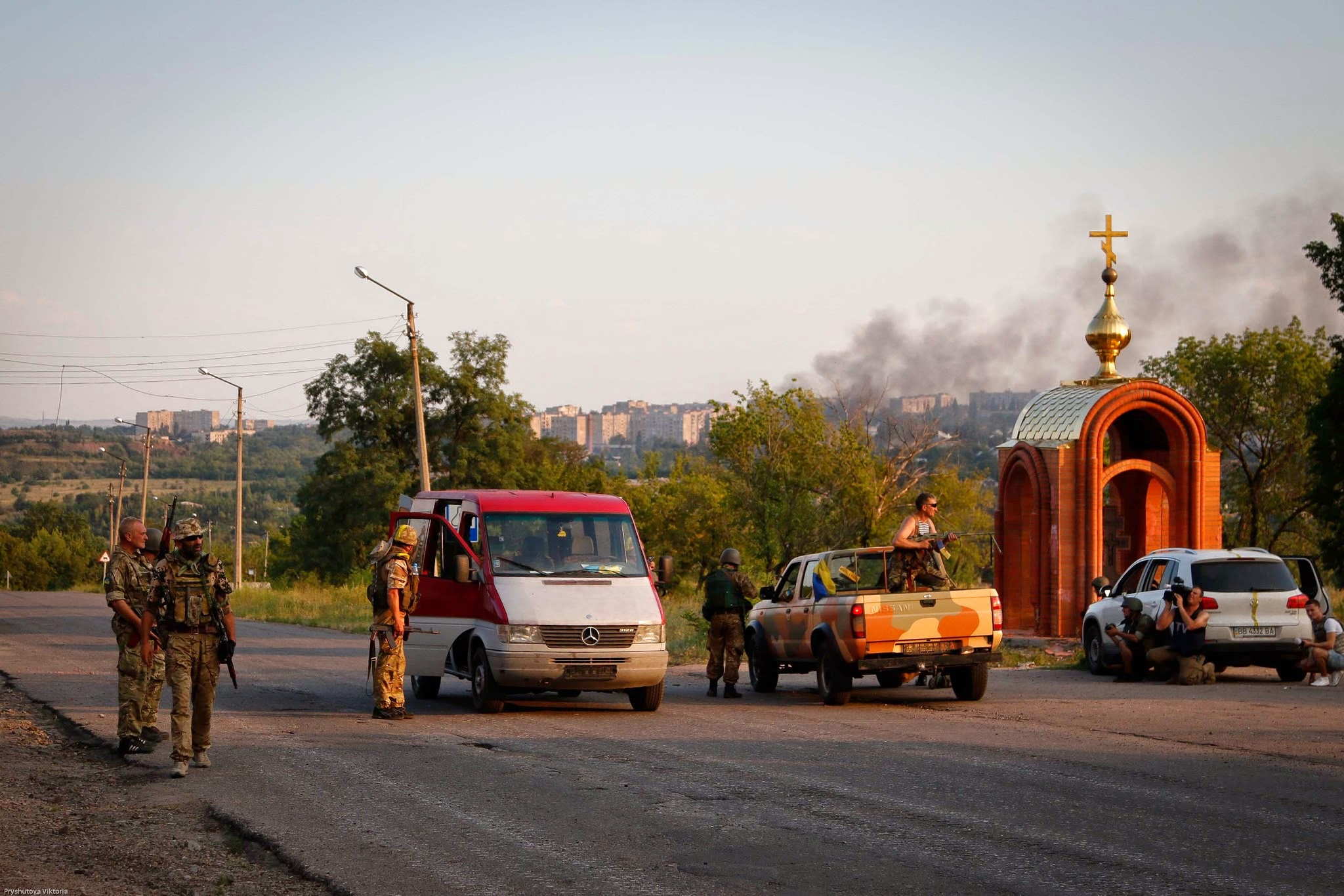
Ukrainian military roadblock near Pervomaisk in 2014

From 2014, Pervomaisk, as all of Donbas, became caught up in the aftermath of Euromaidan. From April 2014, pro-Russia separatists started taking over parts of the south and east of Ukraine. In April and early May 2014, Luhansk and the surrounding area, including Pervomaisk, was taken over by Russian-backed forces of the self-proclaimed Luhansk People's Republic (LPR / LNR). The Ukrainian Government launched their Anti-Terrorist Operation in mid-April 2014, with the aim of taking back all territories under separatist control. In May, the 2014 Donbass status referendums were held. The referendums returned an overwhelming majority vote to cede from Ukraine into the Donetsk and Lugansk People's Republics, however they were condemned and considered sham by the west, and did not obtain international recognition.

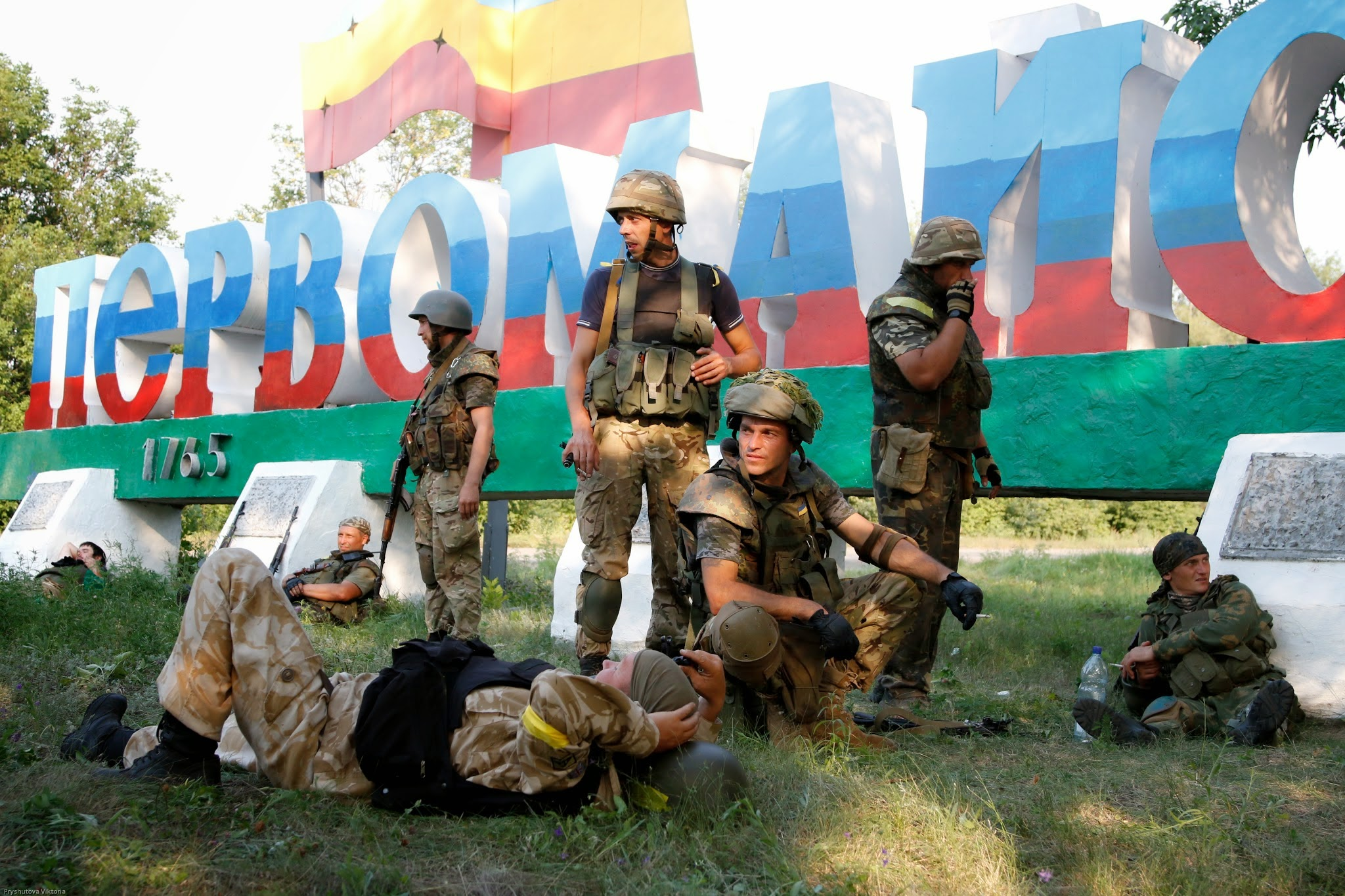
Donbas Battalion near Pervomaisk on 31 July 2014

After several months of little military progress, in July 2014 the Ukrainian forces made sweeping territorial gains, capturing swathes of territory from pro-Russia rebels across Donbas. On 25 July 2014 the Kyiv Post reported that the Ukrainian army push for the city was imminent, and that the separatists had been "chased" by the Ukrainian army from nearby settlements and intended to make Pervomaisk their "last stand". Intense fighting for control of Pervomaisk between the pro-Russia separatists and the Ukrainian army broke out on 28 July 2014, and would wage on throughout August, with both sides claiming control of the city. It would later be established that, despite heavy bombardment, the separatists had held Pervomaisk for the whole time. By September 2014, separatist control of Pervomaisk was undisputed.

Throughout 2014, and 2015 there was heavy shelling by the Ukrainian army of Pervomaisk. In early January 2015 the civilian population of the city was estimated at between 10,000 and 20,000, down from a pre-war population of 38,435. Pervomaisk attracted international attention in 2015 due to the large-scale level of destruction, the first time that level of destruction of a city had been seen in the war in Donbas. Between 2014 and 2022, the city was effectively a frontier settlement, with the frontlines near the city limits, between Pervomaisk and Popasna. In the years from 2015 to 2022, Pervomaisk would see sporadic shelling, from the Ukrainian side.

=== Russian invasion of Ukraine (2022–present) ===
Following the 2022 Russian invasion of Ukraine, Pervomaisk has been hit numerous times by Ukrainian shelling, with multiple civilian casualties and fatalities.

After the 2022 battle of Popasna, between March and May, in which the nearby city of Popasna was completely destroyed, Popasna's status as an independent city was abolished in March 2023 by the Russian occupation authorities due to the extent of the destruction, and Popasna, along with several other surrounding areas, was incorporated into Pervomaisk's administrative area. Pervomaisk and Russia's Kaluga Oblast signed a cooperation agreement in June 2022. In mid-2023, it was reported that repairs were being carried out to buildings in Pervomaisk which had been damaged by shelling. Russian authorities reported that it was planned to repair or rebuild 29 apartment houses, five social infrastructure facilities and 11 infrastructural assets in Pervomaisk. The repairs were being carried out by Kaluga Oblast, which is partnered with Pervomaisk.

On April 3, the Committee on the Organization of State Power, Local Self-government, Regional Development, and Urban Planning in the Verkhovna Rada stated their support for renaming the city to Sokolohirsk. On 19 September 2024, the Verkhovna Rada voted to rename Pervomaisk to Sokolohirsk.

== Demographics ==
Population history
Year	Pop.	±% p.a.
1989	51,025	—
2001	38,800	−2.26%
2013	38,435	−0.08%
2015	15,000	−37.53%
2022	36,091	+13.36%

Ethnicity as of the Ukrainian Census of 2001:

- Ukrainians: 65.9%
- Russians: 27.3%
- Belarusians: 1.1%

Native language as of the 2001 census:

- Russian: 71.2%
- Ukrainian: 23.3%
- Belarusian: 0.2%

== Economy ==
The city's pre-war economy was focused on the mining industry, with several working mines around Pervomaisk.

=== Mines ===
- Zolotoye
- Gorskaya
- Karbonit
- Toshkovskaya
- Pervomaiskaya

=== Factories ===
- Pervomaisk Mechanical Plant
- Pervomaisk Electromechanical Plant
- Repair and Mechanical Plant

=== Other businesses ===
- Pervomaisk Mine-boring Department for Drilling Shafts and Wells
- Pervomaisk Mine Construction Department
- Mikhailovskaya Central Processing Plant

Due to the ongoing war, many mines, factories and businesses in Pervomaisk are either closed, or not in operation. The static inverter plant of HVDC Volgograd–Donbass is located to the northeast of the city.

== Geography ==
Pervomaisk is located in a traditional mining region, and surrounded by mines.

Pervovmaisk is 63 kilometres (39 mi) from Izvaryne, where there is the de jure international border between Ukraine and Russia, however during the war in Donbas, the LPR took control of the border, in autumn 2014. From autumn 2014 until late 2022, Izvaryne would serve as a border between the LPR and Russia. After Russia's annexation referendums of September 2022, Izvaryne has served as a checkpoint between the LPR, and Rostov Oblast.

== Notable people ==
- Oleksandr Beresch (1977–2004), Ukrainian gymnast
