= Stakhanov (surname) =

Stakhanov (Russian: Стаханов) is a Russian surname which has derived from the Turkic name Stakhan, another version states that the name has derived from Greek: Στάχυς - as Stachys the Apostle or Evstakhiy.

- Alexey Stakhanov, a famous Russian innovator of mining industry in the Soviet Union and founder of the Stakhanovite movement
- Nikolai Stakhanov, a commander of border forces of the USSR during World War II, a minister of Internal Affairs of the USSR and the Russian SFSR
