= Hannivka, Alchevsk Raion, Luhansk Oblast =

Urban locality in Luhansk Oblast, Ukraine

Hannivka Ганнівка
- Rural settlement
- Location of Hannivka within Luhansk Oblast#Location of Hannivka within Ukraine Hannivka (Ukraine)
- Coordinates: 48°28′54″N 38°32′54″E
- Country: Ukraine
- Oblast: Luhansk Oblast
- Raion: Alchevsk Raion
- Hromada: Kadiivka urban hromada
- Founded: 1915
- Elevation: 180 m (590 ft)

Population (2022)
  - Total: 241
- Time zone: UTC+2 (EET)
  - Summer (DST): UTC+3 (EEST)
- Postal code: 94193
- Area code: +380 6443

Hannivka (Ukrainian: Ганнівка) is a rural settlement in Kadiivka urban hromada, Alchevsk Raion (district), Luhansk Oblast (region), Ukraine. Population: 241 (2022 estimate)

== Demographics ==
Native language distribution as of the Ukrainian Census of 2001:

- Ukrainian: 89.42%
- Russian: 9.19%
- Others 0.28%
