= City of regional significance (Ukraine) =

Type of second-level unit of the administrative division of Ukraine

Cities of regional significance
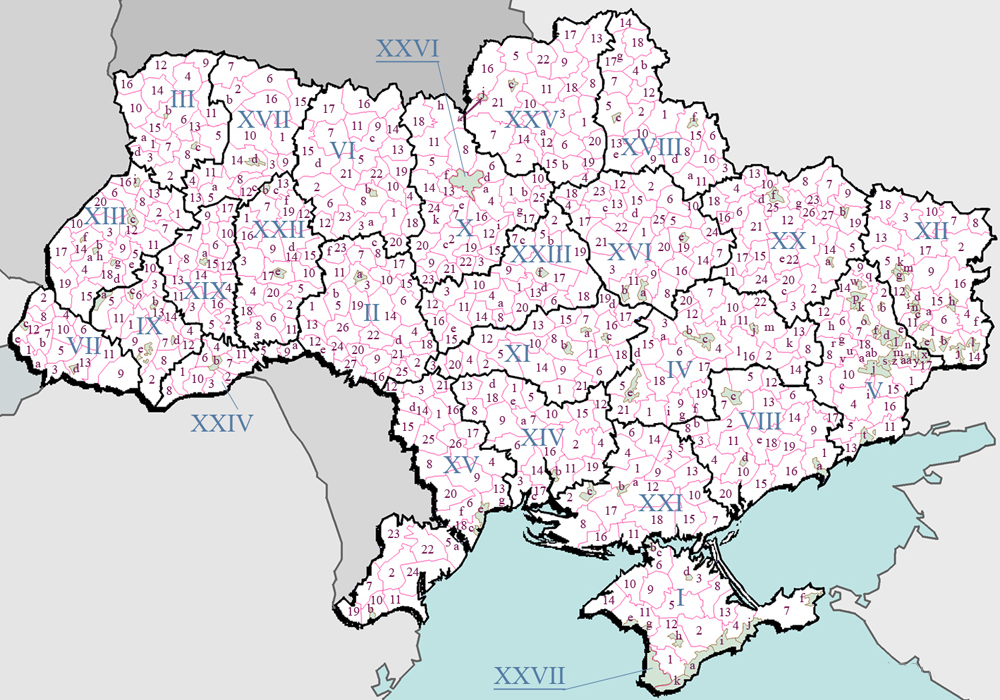
- The cities are marked with Latin alphabet lettering.
- Category: Second-level subdivision
- Location: Ukraine
- Created: 1932
- Abolished: 2020
- Number: 187 (as of 2020)
- Government: City council
- Subdivisions: Urban districts Councils (municipalities)

A city of regional significance (Ukrainian: місто обласного значення, romanized: misto oblasnoho znachennia) in Ukraine was a type of second-level administrative division or municipality, the other type being raions (districts). In the first-level division of oblasts, they were referred to as cities of oblast significance; in the first-level autonomous republic of Crimea, they were cities of republican significance. The designation was created with the introduction of oblasts in 1932. It was abolished in a 2020 reform that merged raions together and integrated the city municipalities into them.

Such city municipality was complex and usually combined the city proper and adjacent populated places. The city of regional (oblast) significance was governed by a city council known as mis'krada, which was chaired by a mayor. There were instances where a municipality might have included only the city alone (city proper), while in others instances a municipality might have consisted of its own subdivisions such as districts in city, similarly to the cities with special status or even other cities which carried the designation of cities of district significance.

== Definition ==
Each region had at least one city of regional significance as its administrative center. A city was usually granted the status for being an economic and cultural center that has a developed industry, utilities, a considerable amount of state provided housing, and a population of over 50,000, and if for further economic and social development of a city it was appropriate to establish a direct management by regional organizations.

In some cases, a city with a population of less than 50,000 could be a city of regional significance if it had industrial, social-cultural, and historical significance, or a propensity for further economical and social development and population increase. These exceptions were usually granted on a decision of the Verkhovna Rada (the Supreme Council of Ukraine).

The city could be divided into districts at the city's authorities' discretion. Along with the raions of a region, the cities of regional significance are the second level of administrative-territorial division of Ukraine. Beside having districts, the city can be divided into various municipal councils (rada, often considered its extended metropolitan area and suburbs) such as smaller city councils, town councils, or rural councils. A city of regional significance can simply be composed of one settlement itself.

In 2012, there were 178 cities of regional significance across the different regions of Ukraine, ranging from Donetsk Oblast, which has the highest number of cities at 28. On average there are seven cities in each oblast or Crimea.

== List of cities by oblast ==
Population statistics are from the 2001 Ukrainian Census. An asterisk (*) indicates cities that have district division.

small city category

=== Autonomous Republic of Crimea ===
| # | Name | Year | Area (km^{2}.) | Population | Density | No. of settlements | |
| # | Name | Year | Area (km^{2}.) | Population | Density | Urban | Rural |
|---|---|---|---|---|---|---|---|
| a | Alushta | 1964 | 600 | 53,727 | 90 | 2 | 24 |
| b | Armiansk | 1993 | 162 | 26,187 | 162 | 1 | 3 |
| c | Krasnoperekopsk | 1976 | 22 | 31,023 | 1,410 | 1 | |
| d | Dzhankoi | 1963 | 26 | 43,343 | 1,667 | 1 | |
| e | Yevpatoria | 19?? | 65 | 120,638 | 1,856 | 4 | |
| f | Kerch | 19?? | 108 | 157,007 | 1,454 | 1 | |
| g | Saky | 1979 | 29 | 29,416 | 1,014 | 1 | |
| h | Simferopol* | 19?? | 107 | 363,597 | 3,398 | 5 | 1 |
| i | Sudak | 19?? | 539 | 28,319 | 53 | 2 | 14 |
| j | Feodosia | 19?? | 350 | 108,571 | 310 | 6 | 11 |
| k | Yalta | 19?? | 283 | 144,434 | 510 | 23 | 9 |

=== Cherkasy Oblast ===
| # | Name | Year | Area (km^{2}.) | Population | Density | No. of settlements | |
| # | Name | Year | Area (km^{2}.) | Population | Density | Urban | Rural |
|---|---|---|---|---|---|---|---|
| a | Vatutine | 1992 | 11 | 20,971 | 1,906 | 1 | 1 |
| b | Zolotonosha | 1992 | 45 | 29,925 | 665 | 1 | 3 |
| c | Kaniv | 19?? | 17 | 26,657 | 1,568 | ? | ? |
| d | Smila | 19?? | 40 | 69,720 | 1,743 | 1 | 1 |
| e | Uman | 19?? | 41 | 88,735 | 2,164 | ? | ? |
| f | Cherkasy* | 19?? | 78 | 296,191 | 3,797 | 1 | 1 |

=== Chernihiv Oblast ===
| # | Name | Year | Area (km^{2}.) | Population | Density | No. of settlements | |
| # | Name | Year | Area (km^{2}.) | Population | Density | Urban | Rural |
|---|---|---|---|---|---|---|---|
| a | Nizhyn | 19?? | 43 | 76,625 | 1,782 | ? | ? |
| b | Pryluky | 19?? | 40 | 64,861 | 1,622 | ? | ? |
| c | Chernihiv* | 19?? | 71 | 304,994 | 4,296 | ? | ? |
| d | Novhorod-Siverskyi | ???? | 11.81 | 15,175 | 1,285 | ? | ? |

=== Chernivtsi Oblast ===
| # | Name | Year | Area (km^{2}.) | Population | Density | No. of settlements | |
| # | Name | Year | Area (km^{2}.) | Population | Density | Urban | Rural |
|---|---|---|---|---|---|---|---|
| a | Novodnistrovsk | 2000 | 3 | 10,342 | 3,447 | ? | ? |
| b | Chernivtsi* | 19?? | 153 | 240,621 | 1,573 | ? | ? |

=== Dnipropetrovsk Oblast ===
| # | Name | Year | Area (km^{2}.) | Population | Density | No. of settlements | |
| # | Name | Year | Area (km^{2}.) | Population | Density | Urban | Rural |
|---|---|---|---|---|---|---|---|
| a | Vilnohirsk | 1990 | 10 | 23,782 | 2,378 | ? | ? |
| b | Kamianske* | 193? | 150 | 262,704 | 1,751 | 2 | 1 |
| c | Dnipro* | 19?? | 397 | 1,080,846 | 2,723 | 2 | 0 |
| d | Zhovti Vody | 1957 | 34 | 54,370 | 1,599 | 1 | 1 |
| e | Kryvyi Rih* | 19?? | 422 | 712,507 | 1,688 | 1 | 5 |
| f | Marhanets | 19?? | 36 | 50,591 | 1,405 | 2 | 1 |
| g | Nikopol | 1937 | 50 | 136,280 | 2,726 | ? | ? |
| h | Novomoskovsk | 19?? | 36 | 72,439 | 2,012 | ? | ? |
| i | Pokrov | 19?? | 26 | 46,532 | 1,790 | 3 | 0 |
| j | Pavlohrad | 19?? | 59 | 118,816 | 2,014 | ? | ? |
| k | Pershotravensk | 1989 | 3 | 29,140 | 9,713 | ? | ? |
| l | Synelnykove | 1979 | 23 | 32,302 | 1,404 | ? | ? |
| m | Ternivka | 1990 | 18 | 29,253 | 1,625 | 1 | 1 |

=== Donetsk Oblast ===
| # | Name | Raion or city (Ukrainian Wikipedia) | Area (km^{2}.) | Population | Density | No. of settlements |
| # | Name | Raion or city (Ukrainian Wikipedia) | Area (km^{2}.) | Population | Density | Urban ! width=10%|Rural |
|---|---|---|---|---|---|---|
| a | Avdiivka | Авдіївка | 29 | 37,210 | 1,283 | |
| b | Bakhmut | Бахмут | 74 | 113,360 | 1,532 | |
| c | Vuhledar | Вугледар | 5 | 17,440 | 3,488 | |
| d | Horlivka | Горлівка | 422 | 314,660 | 746 | |
| e | Debaltseve | Дебальцеве | 38 | 52,214 | 1,374 | |
| f | Toretsk | Торецьк | 62 | 87,024 | 1,404 | |
| g | Myrnohrad | Мирноград | 23 | 55,815 | 2,427 | |
| h | Dobropillia | Добропілля | 20 | 71,695 | 3,585 | |
| i | Dokuchaievsk | Докучаєвськ | 119 | 25,265 | 212 | |
| j | Donetsk | Донецьк | 571 | 1,033,424 | 1,810 | |
| k | Druzhkivka | Дружківка | 47 | 74,901 | 1,594 | |
| l | Yenakiieve | Єнакієве | 425 | 161,535 | 380 | |
| m | Zhdanivka | Жданівка | 2 | 14,793 | 7,397 | |
| n | Khrestivka | Хрестівка | 7 | 30,910 | 4,416 | |
| o | Kostiantynivka | Костянтинівка | 66 | 95,111 | 1,441 | |
| p | Kramatorsk | Краматорськ | 356 | 216,162 | 607 | |
| q | Lyman | Лиман | 192 | 29,610 | 154 | |
| r | Pokrovsk | Покровськ | 39 | 83,251 | 2,135 | |
| s | Makiivka | Макіївка | 426 | 432,830 | 1,016 | |
| t | Mariupol | Маріуполь | 244 | 514,548 | 2,109 | |
| u | Novohrodivka | Новогродівка | 6 | 17,473 | 2,912 | |
| v | Selydove | Селидове | 108 | 62,589 | 580 | |
| w | Sloviansk | Словянськ | 74 | 146,585 | 1,981 | |
| x | Snizhne | Сніжне | 189 | 82,609 | 437 | |
| y | Chystiakove | Чистякове | 105 | 95,632 | 911 | |
| z | Khartsyzk | Харцизьк | 207 | 114,105 | 551 | |
| aa | Shakhtarsk | Шахтарськ | 51 | 71,658 | 1,405 | |
| ab | Yasynuvata | Ясинувата | 19 | 37,552 | 1,976 | |

=== Ivano-Frankivsk Oblast ===
| # | Raion or city | Raion or city (Ukrainian Wikipedia) | Area (km^{2}.) | Population (1 December 2001) | Density (people on 1 km^{2}.) | Centre | Important cities |
|---|---|---|---|---|---|---|---|
| a | Bolekhiv | Болехів | 300 | 21,219 | 71 | | |
| b | Ivano-Frankivsk | Івано-Франківськ | 84 | 233,418 | 2,779 | | |
| c | Kalush | Калуш | 65 | 67,902 | 1,045 | | |
| d | Kolomyia | Коломия | 41 | 61,989 | 1,512 | | |
| e | Yaremcha | Яремча | 657 | 21,450 | 33 | | |
| f | Burshtyn | Бурштин | 32.71 | 15,298 | 467 | | |

=== Kyiv Oblast ===
| # | Raion or city | Raion or city (Ukrainian Wikipedia) | Area (km^{2}.) | Population (1 December 2001) | Density (people on 1 km^{2}.) | Centre | Important cities |
|---|---|---|---|---|---|---|---|
| a | Boryspil | Бориспіль | 20 | 54,591 | 2,730 | | |
| b | Berezan | Березань | 33 | 17,367 | 526 | | |
| c | Bila Tserkva | Біла Церква | 34 | 200,131 | 5,886 | | |
| d | Brovary | Бровари | 34 | 86,839 | 2,554 | | |
| e | Vasylkiv | Васильків | 21 | 39,722 | 1,892 | | |
| f | Irpin | Ірпінь | 38 | 101,761 | 2,678 | | |
| g | Pereiaslav | Переяслав | 32 | 31,634 | 989 | | |
| h | Pripyat | Прип'ять | 6 | 0 | 0 | | |
| i | Rzhyschiv | Ржищів | 36 | 8,447 | 235 | | |
| j | Slavutych | Славутич | 21 | 24,402 | 1,162 | | |
| k | Fastiv | Фастів | 43 | 51,976 | 1,209 | | |
| l | Bucha* | Буча | 26 | 28,533 | 1,100 | | |
| m | Obukhiv* | Обухів | 24 | 32,737 | 1,400 | | |

^{*} - Not shown on map

=== Kirovohrad Oblast ===
| # | Raion or city | Raion or city (Ukrainian Wikipedia) | Area (km^{2}.) | Population (1 December 2001) | Density (people on 1 km^{2}.) | Centre | Important cities |
|---|---|---|---|---|---|---|---|
| a | Znamianka | Знам'янка | 15 | 35,569 | 2,371 | | |
| b | Kropyvnytskyi | Кропивницький | 103 | 262,543 | 2,549 | | |
| c | Oleksandriia | Олександрія | 61 | 104,461 | 1,712 | | |
| d | Svitlovodsk | Світловодськ | 45 | 57,609 | 1,280 | | |

=== Kharkiv Oblast ===
| # | Raion or city | Raion or city (Ukrainian Wikipedia) | Area (km^{2}.) | Population (1 December 2001) | Density (people on 1 km^{2}.) | Centre | Important cities |
|---|---|---|---|---|---|---|---|
| a | Izium | Ізюм | 40 | 56,114 | 1,403 | | |
| b | Kupiansk | Куп’янськ | 33 | 62,620 | 1,898 | | |
| c | Lozova | Лозова | 18 | 73,098 | 4,061 | | |
| d | Liubotyn | Люботин | 31 | 26,945 | 869 | | |
| e | Pervomaiskyi | Первомайський | 30 | 33,016 | 1,101 | | |
| f | Kharkiv | Харків | 306 | 1,470,902 | 4,807 | | |
| g | Chuhuiv | Чугуїв | 13 | 37,715 | 2,901 | | |

=== Kherson Oblast ===
| # | Raion or city | Raion or city (Ukrainian Wikipedia) | Area (km^{2}.) | Population (1 December 2001) | Density (people on 1 km^{2}.) | Centre | Important cities |
|---|---|---|---|---|---|---|---|
| a | Kakhovka | Каховка | 31 | 38,238 | 1,233 | | |
| b | Nova Kakhovka | Нова Каховка | 223 | 74,599 | 335 | | |
| c | Kherson | Херсон | 423 | 367,188 | 868 | | |
| d | Hola Prystan | Гола Пристань | 9 | 16,028 | 1,780 | | |

=== Khmelnytskyi Oblast ===
| # | Raion or city | Raion or city (Ukrainian Wikipedia) | Area (km^{2}.) | Population (1 December 2001) | Density (people on 1 km^{2}.) | Centre | Important cities |
|---|---|---|---|---|---|---|---|
| a | Kamianets-Podilskyi | Кам'янець-Подільський | 26 | 99,610 | 3,831 | | |
| b | Netishyn | Нетішин | 66 | 34,340 | 520 | | |
| c | Slavuta | Славута | 22 | 34,358 | 1,562 | | |
| d | Starokostiantyniv | Старокостянтинів | 17 | 35,206 | 2,071 | | |
| e | Khmelnytskyi | Хмельницький | 86 | 253,994 | 2,953 | | |
| f | Shepetivka | Шепетівка | 38 | 48,212 | 1,269 | | |

=== Luhansk Oblast ===
| # | Raion or city | Raion or city (Ukrainian Wikipedia) | Area (km^{2}.) | Population (1 December 2001) | Density (people on 1 km^{2}.) | Centre | Important cities |
|---|---|---|---|---|---|---|---|
| a | Alchevsk | Алчевськ | 49 | 119,193 | 2,433 | | |
| b | Antratsyt | Антрацит | 61 | 90,835 | 1,489 | | |
| c | Brianka | Брянка | 64 | 61,357 | 959 | | |
| n | Kadiivka | Кадіївка | 92 | 108,266 | 1,177 | | |
| d | Holubivka | Голубівка | 35 | 45,012 | 1,286 | | |
| e | Khrustalnyi | Хрустальний | 154 | 145,129 | 942 | | |
| f | Sorokyne | Сорокине | 77 | 118,168 | 1,535 | | |
| g | Lysychansk | Лисичанськ | 96 | 133,258 | 1,388 | | |
| h | Luhansk | Луганськ | 286 | 503,248 | 1,760 | | |
| i | Pervomaisk | Первомайськ | 89 | 80,622 | 906 | | |
| j | Rovenky | Ровеньки | 217 | 91,712 | 423 | | |
| k | Rubizhne | Рубіжне | 34 | 65,322 | 1,921 | | |
| l | Dovzhansk | Довжанськ | 84 | 110,159 | 1,311 | | |
| m | Sievierodonetsk | Сєверодонецьк | 58 | 129,752 | 2,237 | | |

=== Lviv Oblast ===
| # | Raion or city | Raion or city (Ukrainian Wikipedia) | Area (km^{2}.) | Population (1 December 2001) | Density (people on 1 km^{2}.) | Centre | Important cities |
|---|---|---|---|---|---|---|---|
| a | Boryslav | Борислав | 37 | 40,434 | 1,093 | | |
| b | Drohobych | Дрогобич | 41 | 99,982 | 2,439 | | |
| c | Lviv* | Львів | 171 | 758,526 | 4,436 | | |
| d | Morshyn | Моршин | 2 | 6,482 | 3,241 | | |
| e | Novyi Rozdil | Новий Розділ | 8 | 28,227 | 3,528 | | |
| f | Sambir | Самбір | 15 | 36,556 | 2,437 | | |
| g | Stryi | Стрий | 17 | 62,479 | 3,675 | | |
| h | Truskavets | Трускавець | 8 | 31,037 | 3,880 | | |
| i | Chervonohrad | Червоноград | 17 | 85,359 | 5,021 | | |

=== Mykolaiv Oblast ===
| # | Raion or city | Raion or city (Ukrainian Wikipedia) | Area (km^{2}.) | Population (1 December 2001) | Density (people on 1 km^{2}.) | Centre | Important cities |
|---|---|---|---|---|---|---|---|
| a | Voznesensk | Вознесенськ | 23 | 42,634 | 1,854 | | |
| b | Mykolaiv | Миколаїв | 260 | 514,136 | 1,977 | | |
| c | Ochakiv | Очаків | 13 | 16,929 | 1,302 | | |
| d | Pervomaisk | Первомайськ | 25 | 70,170 | 2,807 | | |
| e | Yuzhnoukrainsk | Южноукраїнськ | 24 | 38,206 | 1,592 | | |

=== Odesa Oblast ===
| # | Raion or city | Raion or city (Ukrainian Wikipedia) | Area (km^{2}.) | Population (1 December 2001) | Density (people on 1 km^{2}.) | Centre | Important cities |
|---|---|---|---|---|---|---|---|
| a | Bilhorod-Dnistrovskyi | Білгород-Дністровський | 31 | 58,436 | 1,885 | | |
| b | Chornomorsk | Чорноморськ | 25 | 63,726 | 2,549 | | |
| c | Izmail | Ізмаїл | 53 | 84,815 | 1,600 | | |
| d | Odesa | Одеса | 139 | 1,029,049 | 7,403 | | |
| e | Podilsk | Подільськ | 15 | 40,718 | 2,715 | | |
| f | Teplodar | Теплодар | 3 | 8,830 | 2,943 | | |
| g | Yuzhne | Южне | 9 | 23,977 | 2,664 | | |
| h | Balta | Балта | 22.97 | 19,962 | 869 | | |
| i | Biliaivka | Біляївка | 14.554 | 14,294 | 982 | | |

=== Poltava Oblast ===
| # | Raion or city | Raion or city (Ukrainian Wikipedia) | Area (km^{2}.) | Population (1 December 2001) | Density (people on 1 km^{2}.) | Centre | Important cities |
|---|---|---|---|---|---|---|---|
| a | Horishni Plavni | Горішні Плавні | 174 | 54,313 | 312 | | |
| b | Kremenchuk | Кременчук | 96 | 234,073 | 2,438 | | |
| c | Lubny | Лубни | 30 | 52,572 | 1,752 | | |
| d | Myrhorod | Миргород | 29 | 42,886 | 1,479 | | |
| e | Poltava | Полтава | 104 | 317,998 | 3,058 | | |
| f | Hadiach | Гадяч | 17.78 | 22,698 | 1275 | | |

=== Rivne Oblast ===
| # | Raion or city | Raion or city (Ukrainian Wikipedia) | Area (km^{2}.) | Population (1 December 2001) | Density (people on 1 km^{2}.) | Centre | Important cities |
|---|---|---|---|---|---|---|---|
| a | Dubno | Дубно | 27 | 39,146 | 1,450 | | |
| b | Ostroh | Острог | 10 | 14,801 | 1,480 | | |
| c | Rivne | Рівне | 58 | 248,813 | 4,290 | | |
| d | Varash | Вараш | 4 | 38,830 | 9,708 | | |

=== Sumy Oblast ===
| # | Raion or city | Raion or city (Ukrainian Wikipedia) | Area (km^{2}.) | Population (1 December 2001) | Density (people on 1 km^{2}.) | Centre | Important cities |
|---|---|---|---|---|---|---|---|
| a | Hlukhiv | Глухів | 84 | 36,056 | 429 | | |
| b | Konotop | Конотоп | 103 | 97,296 | 945 | | |
| c | Lebedyn | Лебедин | 167 | 29,710 | 178 | | |
| d | Okhtyrka | Охтирка | 31 | 50,713 | 1,636 | | |
| e | Romny | Ромни | 29 | 50,929 | 1,756 | | |
| f | Shostka | Шостка | 36 | 87,130 | 2,420 | | |
| g | Sumy | Суми | 146 | 295,847 | 2,026 | | |

=== Ternopil Oblast ===
| # | Raion or city | Raion or city (Ukrainian Wikipedia) | Area (km^{2}.) | Population (1 December 2001) | Density (people on 1 km^{2}.) | Centre | Important cities |
|---|---|---|---|---|---|---|---|
| a | Ternopil | Тернопіль | 59 | 227,755 | 3,860 | | |
| b | Chortkiv | Чортків | 30 | 29,057 | 969 | | |
| c | Kremenets | Кременець | 18.14 | 22,051 | 1,216 | | |
| d | Berezhany | Бережани | 18 | 17,617 | 979 | | |

=== Vinnytsia Oblast ===
| # | Raion or city | Raion or city (Ukrainian Wikipedia) | Area (km^{2}.) | Population (1 December 2001) | Density (people on 1 km^{2}.) | Centre | Important cities |
|---|---|---|---|---|---|---|---|
| a | Vinnytsia | Вінниця | 61 | 356,665 | 5,847 | | |
| b | Zhmerynka | Жмеринка | 18 | 37,349 | 2,075 | | |
| c | Koziatyn | Козятин | 9 | 27,643 | 3,071 | | |
| d | Ladyzhyn | Ладижин | 11 | 23,456 | 2,132 | | |
| e | Mohyliv-Podilskyi | Могилів-Подільський | 22 | 33,138 | 1,506 | | |
| f | Khmilnyk | Хмільник | 20 | 27,898 | 1,395 | | |

=== Volyn Oblast ===
| # | Raion or city | Raion or city (Ukrainian Wikipedia) | Area (km^{2}.) | Population (1 December 2001) | Density (people on 1 km^{2}.) | Centre | Important cities |
|---|---|---|---|---|---|---|---|
| a | Volodymyr-Volynskyi | Володимир-Волинський | 17 | 38,256 | 2,250 | | |
| b | Kovel | Ковель | 47 | 66,401 | 1,413 | | |
| c | Lutsk | Луцьк | 42 | 208,816 | 4,972 | | |
| d | Novovolynsk | Нововолинськ | 17 | 58,688 | 3,452 | | |

=== Zakarpattia Oblast ===
| # | Raion or city | Raion or city (Ukrainian Wikipedia) | Area (km^{2}.) | Population (1 December 2001) | Density (people on 1 km^{2}.) | Centre | Important cities |
|---|---|---|---|---|---|---|---|
| a | Berehove | Берегове | 15 | 27,235 | 1,816 | | |
| b | Mukachevo | Мукачево | 28 | 82,346 | 2,941 | | |
| c | Uzhhorod | Ужгород | 33 | 117,317 | 3,555 | | |
| d | Khust | Хуст | 11 | 32,348 | 2,941 | | |
| e | Chop | Чоп | 2 | 8,919 | 4,460 | | |

=== Zaporizhzhia Oblast ===
| # | Raion or city | Raion or city (Ukrainian Wikipedia) | Area (km^{2}.) | Population (1 December 2001) | Density (people on 1 km^{2}.) | Centre | Important cities |
|---|---|---|---|---|---|---|---|
| a | Berdiansk | Бердянськ | 83 | 124,959 | 1,506 | | |
| b | Enerhodar | Енергодар | 64 | 56,242 | 879 | | |
| c | Zaporizhzhia | Запоріжжя | 236 | 817,882 | 3,466 | | |
| d | Melitopol | Мелітополь | 42 | 160,657 | 3,825 | | |
| e | Tokmak | Токмак | 32 | 36,275 | 1,134 | | |

=== Zhytomyr Oblast ===
| # | Raion or city | Raion or city (Ukrainian Wikipedia) | Area (km^{2}.) | Population (1 December 2001) | Density (people on 1 km^{2}.) | Centre | Important cities |
|---|---|---|---|---|---|---|---|
| a | Berdychiv | Бердичів | 36 | 87,575 | 2,433 | | |
| b | Zhytomyr | Житомир | 61 | 284,236 | 4,660 | | |
| c | Korosten | Коростень | 30 | 66,669 | 2,222 | | |
| d | Novohrad-Volynskyi | Новоград-Волинський | 27 | 56,259 | 2,084 | | |
| e | Malyn | Малин | 61 | 27,083 | 0,346 | | |

== See also ==
- Administrative divisions of Ukraine
- City of district significance (Ukraine), similar category for smaller cities
- Consolidated city-county
- List of cities in Ukraine, sortable list of cities by region and population
- List of places named after people (Ukraine)
