= Stakhanov Railway Car Building Works =

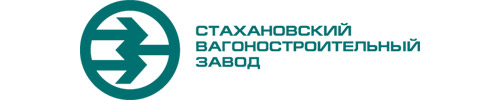
- Type: Public Joint-Stock Company
- Industry: Mechanical engineering
- Founded: 1962; 64 years ago
- Headquarters: 94013, Ukraine, Luhansk Oblast, Kadiivka, 67 Lenina ave.
- Key people: Head Vitaly Kasinov
- Products: Production of railway cars
- Website: www.stakhanovvz.com

Public Joint-Stock Company Stakhanov Railway Car Building Works (Ukrainian: ПАТ Стахановський вагонобудівний завод, romanized: PAT Stakhanovskyi vahonobudivnyi zavod) is an industrial enterprise of Ukraine, located in the city of Kadiivka, Luhansk Oblast, producing freight cars. By 2016, due to the War in Donbas, the plant was seized by the LNR and turned into an insurgent base, with the plant equipment partially dismantled and removed.

== History ==
The factory was founded as a weldments plant in 1962. On 29 June 1965 the first phase of the plant was put into operation with carrying capacity of 10 tons per year of steel constructions for tower cranes, draglines, elevator crane jibs and other equipment.

Since 1967, the plant has specialized in metal cages large capacity boilers for the construction of thermal and hydroelectric power. In December 1969, the plant was reconstructed for the production of mainline freight cars. Already in early 1970, the factory produced the first railway flat car with carrying capacity of 63 tons, mastered the production of wheels and rail carriages.

In 1976, the production of cars for mineral fertilizers was started.

In subsequent years, the design engineering bureau of the plant developed technical documentation for differently functioning cars and special vehicles with carrying capacity of 63 400 tones.

The enterprise mastered the production of railway carriers areal type, sunken-type, articulated, platform and coupling types, wagons for timber, cement, aluminum, construction materials, pelletized polymer materials, flour, containers with carrying capacity of 20 tons of bulk cargo and cement, long-platforms for transportation of large containers and wheeled vehicles, special conveyors, carrying capacity up to 240 tons for the carriage of heavy-duty power transformer and large power equipment, special vehicles for transportation of spent nuclear fuel from nuclear power plants, trucks (dump cars) with carrying capacity of 66 tons, 105 tons, 143 tons, 150 tons of wheel sets for freight wagons two-axle trucks and other products.

During the period 1987–88, the plant was awarded with several prizes of the Ministry of Heavy and Transport Engineering for the development of cost-cutting rolled in serial production of lightweight wagon axles, for the design, development and production of rail transporter of areal type with carrying capacity of 120 tons of mod. 14-6063, for the design, development and production of cars for granular polymer mod. 17-495 and wagons for mineral fertilizer mod. 19-923.

In 1987, the Council of Ministers of Ukraine gave the plant the title "Enterprise of high quality."

In 1990 a group of plant workers was awarded by the Council of Ministers for the work "Complex research, development, industrial development and introduction into the operation of highly efficient heavy railway carriers." For the creation of the best examples of new technique plant was awarded with diplomas, medals and valuable gifts (cars) ENEA.

From 1988 to 1992, on request of the French firm Transmashlink plant produced and delivered 40,000 tons of welded steel constructions for building of a tunnel under the English Channel. Welding work on this contract is certified by Bureau Veritas (France).

The plant gained positive experience in supplying products to foreign partners: to Germany – metal items (flange), to Israel – welded steel, Iran – trucks and wheel sets 1435 mm, South Korea - 16-axle railway carrier of articulated type with carrying capacity of 170 tons.

On commission of the Federal Agency for Atomic Energy of Russia in the shortest time two railway carriers for transportation of nuclear fuel waste TK-13M were made.

In 2003 the serial production of new cars was started: hopper car with enlarged volume of a body, a hopper car unloading in space between the rails, tank wagons for transportation of light petroleum products, open-top car with blank body and open-top car with bottom discharge, which meet all the requirements demanded from the cars of new generation.

For 46 years the plant produced more than 100,000 freight cars, which operate in many countries around the world. Production of the plant is supplied to the public and private transport companies and industrial enterprises in Ukraine, CIS countries and abroad.

All products of PJSC Stakhanov Railway Car Building Works are made in accordance with Intergovernmental standards (GOST), State standards of Ukraine (DSTU) and international and European standards, is certified in the SS FZHT. The enterprise develops a quality management system in accordance with the requirements of МС ISO 9001:2008.

== Events ==
=== 100,000th carriage ===
A few commemorative events held on September 30, 2010, were dedicated to the production of the 100,000th railway wagon, produced by PJSC Stakhanov Railway Car Building Works. Perspectives of Stakhanov Railway Car Building Works contrasts today sharply with the difficult situation of crisis of previous years. The emergence of a new owner of a group of Finance and credit businessman Konstantin Zhevago, after which Stakhanov Wagon Works became a part of the holding company AvtoKrAZ, Vitaly Kasinov compared this event with the second birth of the company. Since 2005, the shareholders have invested to the development of the plant more than 60 million dollars, due to which the volumes of production have increased more than twice compared to the best years of car production in the Soviet times. Today, having constant one hundred percent workload with orders from the company VTB-Leasing, which holds the key position in the leasing segments of Russian railway equipment, Stakhanov builders of wagons reached the stable production of 660 cars per month. Subject to the continuation of investment inflow to the enterprise, the production will be developed, new jobsites will be created. Nowadays one can see that the specialists who were forced to leave the company in times of crisis returned to the plant. An increase of employees this year was 1500. Today, all products of Stakhanov builders of wagons are exported. But the administration of Stakhanov Railway Car Building Works hopes that their products will be of demand on the domestic market as well.

=== A record number of carriages ===
In 2010 Stakhanov Railway Car Building Works reached a record volume of output of products, which totaled 7,434 units of freight rolling stock – an unprecedented result for the entire 45-year-old history of the company. Compared with the 2009 the production of carriages was increased by 4.7 times or for 5,850 cars. In particular, 7,134 open-top cars and 300 hopper cars for the transportation of fertilizers were produced. The owner of the seven thousandth car became one of the largest leasing companies in Russia - VTB-Leasing, which is now a strategic partner of the company.

=== А universal gondola car of model 12-963 ===
Specialists of the Design Management of SVGZ offer consumers of railway equipment a new model of gondola universal model 12 - 963, which fully meets the requirements for the cars of a new generation.

In comparison with the mass-produced gondola car of model 12-9046, a new model has an all-metal welded body volume which is increased by 2 cubic meters to 87 cubic meters. The cover of the side and the end walls is made of smooth sheet instead of the curved profile. On the end wall two zones and five efforts of the P-shaped cross section are set, which ensure high rigidity for the perception of stress in the collisions. Tare weight of the gondola car is reduced per ton. Bearing metal frame, body, parts of the brake linkage, cover of the body, the hatch covers are made of low-alloyed steel according to GOST 19281-89 14 category, the strength class of which is not less than 390. Centre girder is equipped with more technologically advanced and reliable in operation welded lugs. The running gear of the gondola car consists of 2 two-axle bogies of model 18-7020, which are equipped with elastic-rolling runner skids of a new system. In order to improve traffic safety the gondola is equipped with a new system of separate braking carts. Overhaul of the new gondola is increased to 32 years, whereas mileage of nowadays produced analogues is 22 years.

A prototype model of a new gondola car has passed a set of static and dynamic tests and the gondola car was recommended by the inter-ministerial commission for the certification in UkrCEPRO (Ukrainian Certification of Production) and RC FRT (Register on certification of the Federal Railway Transport).

=== Kasinov V.I. ===
Vitaly Kasinov headed PJSC "Stakhanov Railway Car Building Works" since 2004. Under his leadership has started a new stage of development of the company – production of commercial products increased 4-fold, from year to year are created a new work-places. From a simple manufacturer of freight rolling stock SVZ has turned to care of the consumer, proved by comprehensive analysis of the needs of cargo owners and carriers. The company is actively working to develop models of the new generation of cars, to implement the program of modernization of production.

Throughout its history, in 2010, SVZ entered the record indicators in production and social spheres.

Through ongoing work on product quality, market expansion, and new programs, Stakhanov Railway Car Building Works is listed among the leading machine-building enterprises in Ukraine and contributes to the socio-economic development of the region and country.

Vitaly's professional activities made a number of international contacts of SVZ with companies in the Mediterranean countries, the Baltic, the Caspian region become more active. Vitaly also assisted in renewal and expansion of manufacturing of welded metalwork.

At the same time one of the most significant events in his career in 2011, Vitaly Ivanovich considers the nomination of the winner of the XVI National Program "Man of the Year - 2011". March 24, 2012. During the 16th national ceremony-award "Man of the Year - 2011" among the three winners the Kasinov V.I. won the prestigious title of "Industrialist of the Year".

"I am grateful to the organizers of the National Program" Man of the Year "and the Higher Academic Council for this award. But it's not quite true, since it is a merit, first of all, and the collective enterprise, and members of the Supervisory Board and the Joint-stock staff, and all those who are making every effort to develop and operate an enterprise for the benefit of our country "- commented his victory at the National Palace of Arts "Ukraine" Vitaly Kasinov.

This victory was a result of the professional hard work of Vitaly Kasinov and the almost five-thousand collective people headed by him.

"To be successful today is to be professional in your field, have a reliable partners and work for the result," - said Vitaly Ivanovich.

== Production and services ==
=== Production ===
As of 2011 all enterprise production are exported.

Production of car building:

- hopper cars
- gondolas
- box cars
- tank cars
- flat cars
- platforms
- dump cars
- cars bunker type
- schnabel cars

Also mastered the production of undercarriages of the cars:

- Wheelsets
- two-axle bogies

Metal constructions:

- lattice and solid columns
- column ties
- pitched and secondary trusses
- crane runway and gantry girders
- hammer beam
- wind trusses
- beams
- enclosure structures
- brake runway and trusses
- bunkers of different capacities
- stairs, fields, enclosures and other structures.

Services:

- Development and coordination of design documents for freight wagons of various purposes, including transporters of various types of capacity up to 400 tons, special rail vehicles for PID (internal transport) and spare parts for freight cars, including load-carrying constructions for Schnabel cars
- Development of design documentation stage of CMD on working drawings of the customer under the CM for building metal constructions (columns, trusses, beams, bridge construction, etc.)
- Bending works
- Mechanical working of parts
- Mechanical working of wood and metal
- Mechanical working of castings
- Metal-roll heat treatment
- Gear-cutting work
- Lathes work
- Works in thermal stations and facilities of high electro-and high-frequency
- Electricity, gas-welding operation, control of weld
- Works with manual and electrical tools and pneumatic tools and instruments
- Locksmithing
- Turning and boring work
- Round-grinding work
- Machining of large parts
- Metal cutting
- Treatment of joints
- Blasting surface treatment
- Surface work
- Gear- grinding Work
- Gear- grinding Work
- Varnish-and-paint work, primer, coat-work, anti-corrosion surface treatment
- Service batteries, galvanic work
- Works related to the annealing of steel, alloys and castings
- Mechanical installation
- Manufacturing and testing of slings
- Manufacturing of compression tank
