= Alexei Stakhanov =

Soviet miner (1906–1977)

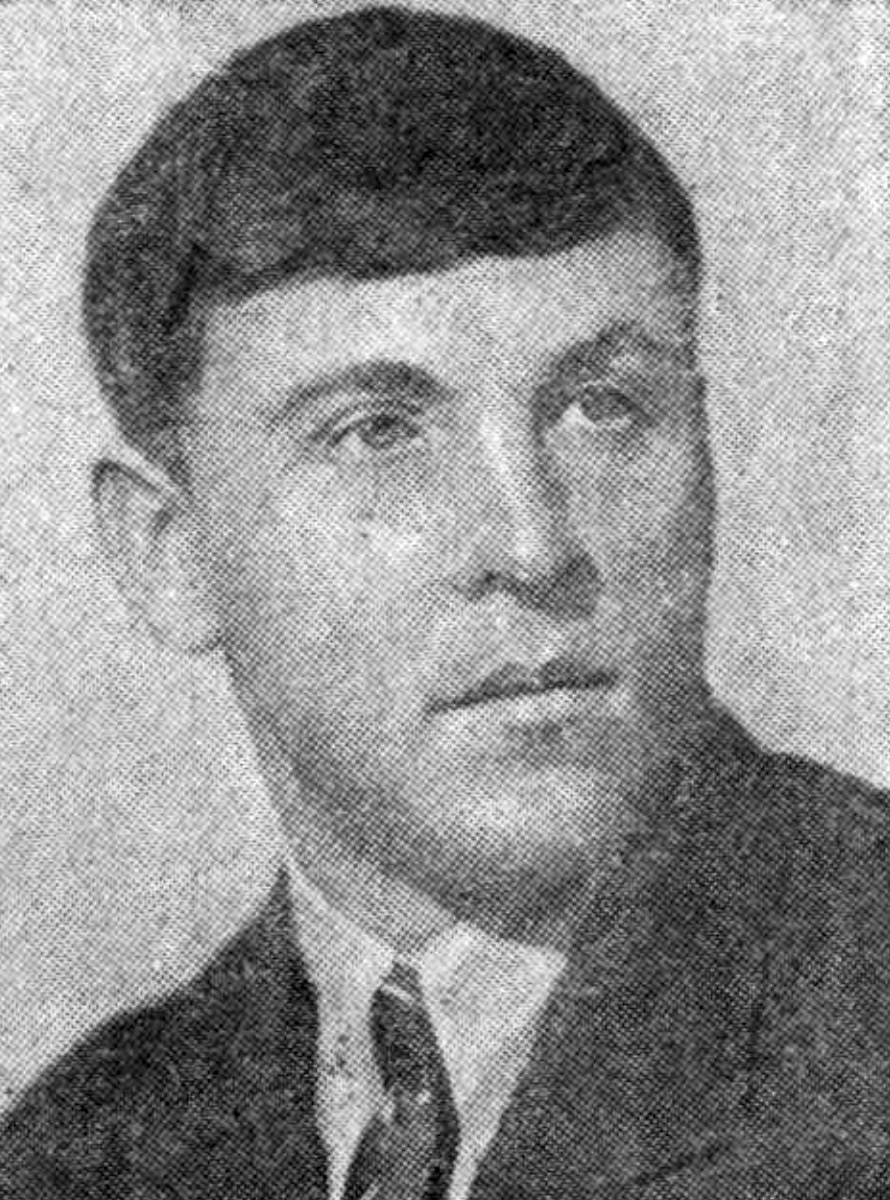
- Stakhanov in 1938
- Born: Alexei Grigoryevich Stakhanov; 3 January 1906; Lugovaya, Livensky Uezd, Orel Governorate, Russian Empire
- Died: 5 November 1977 (aged 71); Torez, Donetsk Oblast, Ukrainian SSR, Soviet Union
- Occupation: Miner
- Years active: 1933–74
- Known for: The beginnings of the Stakhanovite movement
- Political party: Communist Party of the Soviet Union (1936–74)
- Awards: Order of Lenin (2 times); Order of the Red Banner of Labour; Hero of Socialist Labour (1970)

Alexei Grigoryevich Stakhanov (Russian: Алексе́й Григо́рьевич Стаха́нов, IPA: [stɐˈxanəf]; 3 January 1906 – 5 November 1977) was a Soviet miner, Hero of Socialist Labour (1970), and a member of the CPSU (1936).

He became a celebrity in 1935 as part of what became known as the Stakhanovite movement—a campaign intended to increase worker productivity and to demonstrate the superiority of the socialist economic system.

== Biography ==
Alexei Stakhanov was born in Lugovaya (now in Izmalkovsky District), a village in the Livensky Uezd of the Orel Governorate of the Russian Empire in 1906. In his early 20s, he began working in a mine called "Tsentralnaia-Irmino" (literally Central Irmino) in the village of Irminskiy rudnik (present day Irmino). In 1933, Stakhanov became a jackhammer operator. In 1935, he took a local course in mining. On 31 August 1935, it was reported that he had mined a record 102 tonnes of coal in 5 hours and 45 minutes (14 times his quota).

On 19 September, Stakhanov was reported to have set a new record by mining 227 tonnes of coal in a single shift. His example was held up in newspapers and posters as a model for others to follow, and he appeared on the cover of Time in the United States.

Stakhanov on the cover of Time, 16 December 1935.

In 1936–1941, Stakhanov was a student of the Industrial Academy in Moscow. In 1941–1942, he was appointed director of mine No. 31 in Karaganda. Between 1943 and 1957, Stakhanov worked in the Ministry of Coal Industry of the USSR. In 1957–1959, he was deputy director of the Chistiakovantratsit trust, and after that, assistant chief engineer at the mine management office No. 2/43 of the Torezantratsit trust until his retirement in 1974.

Stakhanov's records set an example throughout the country and gave birth to the Stakhanovite movement, where workers who exceeded production targets could become "Stakhanovites".

Stakhanov was a deputy of the Supreme Soviet of the Soviet Union of the first convocation. He was awarded two Orders of Lenin, Order of the Red Banner of Labour, and numerous medals. The last Sunday of August was designated "Coal Miner's Day", also apparently in his honor.

At some point Stakhanov developed problems with alcohol and came to lose his Order of Lenin and party card during a drunken brawl.

He died in 1977 at the age of 71. The town of Kadiivka in eastern Ukraine where he started his work was renamed Stakhanov in his honour in 1978.

== Record disputed ==
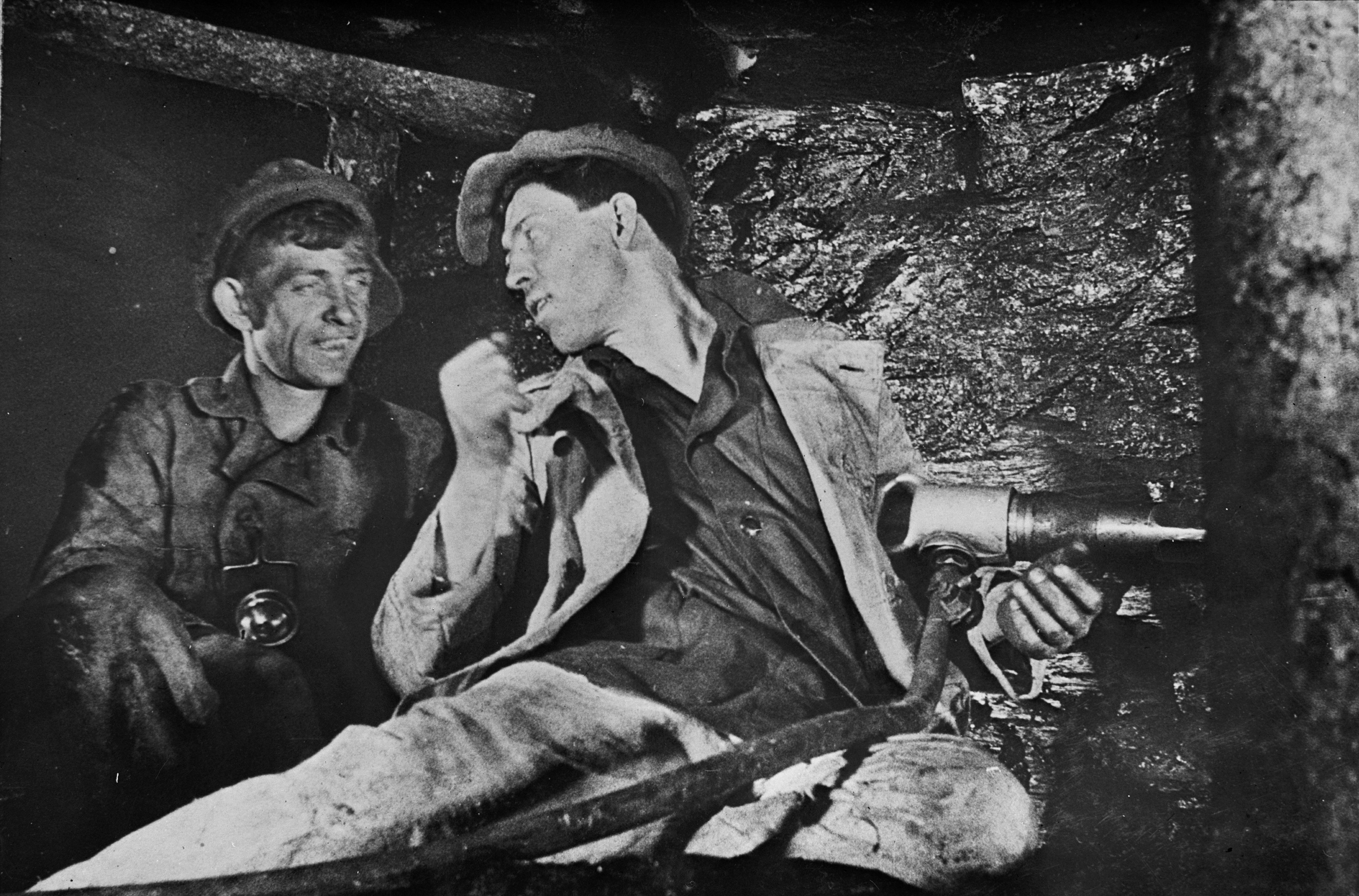
Stakhanov with a fellow miner

The validity of Stakhanov's record has been called into question. In 1985, The New York Times printed a story alleging that though Stakhanov had indeed succeeded in his feat, it was only because the Communist Party had arranged the event as a way of boosting public morale, with many other miners working to help Stakhanov beat the mining record.

The Times quoted the chief of the Tsentralnaia-Irmino mine branch of the Party, Konstantin G. Petrov, as saying that "I suppose Stakhanov need not have been the first ... It could have been anybody else. In the final analysis, it was not the individual face-worker who determined whether the attempt to break the record would succeed, but the new system of coal extraction."

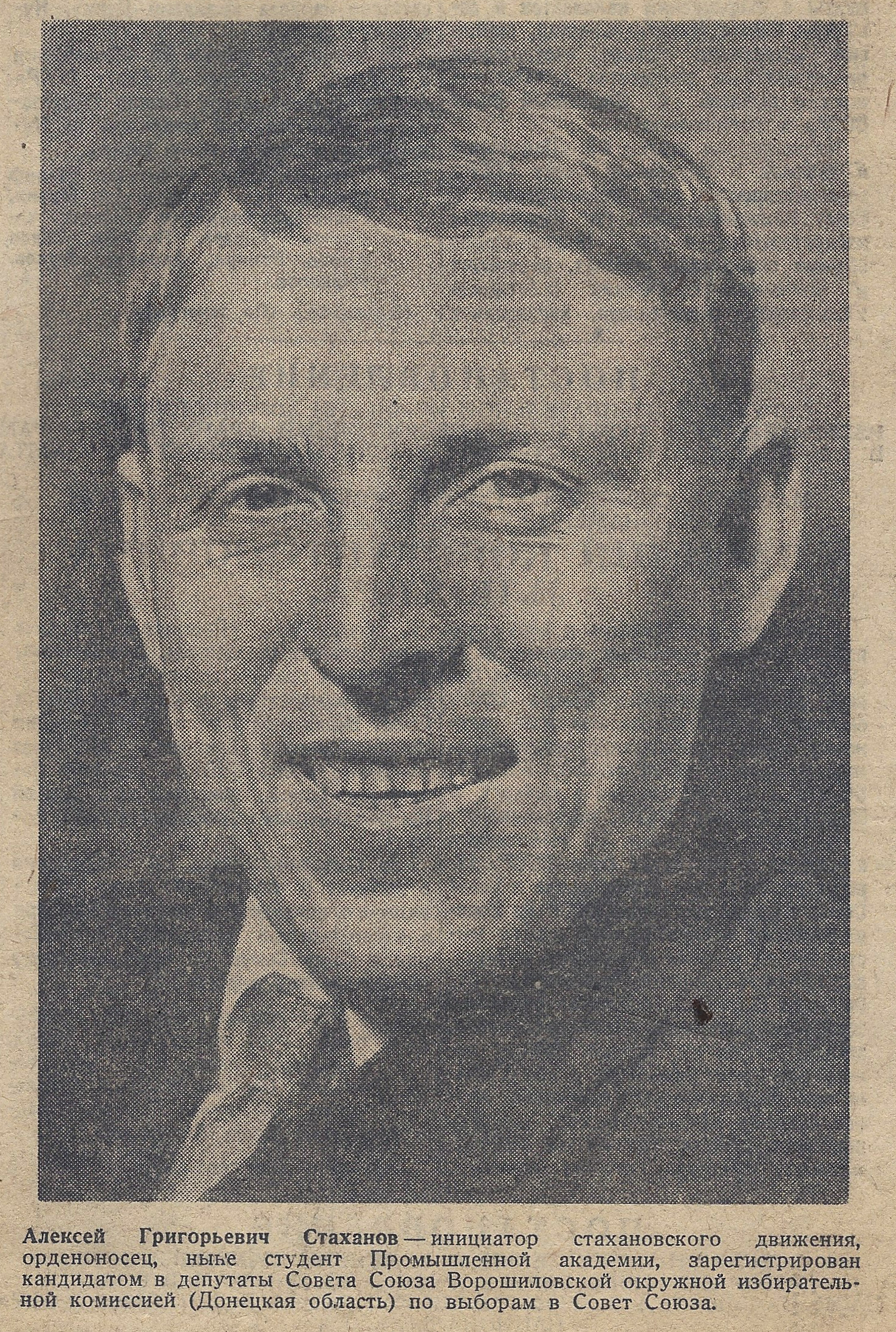
Alexei Stakhanov, the student of Industrial Academy on the front page of Pravda issue 314 (7280) dated Nov 15 1937

In 1988, the Soviet newspaper Komsomolskaya Pravda said the widely cited achievements of Stakhanov were puffery. The paper insisted that Stakhanov had used a number of helpers on support works, while the throughput was tallied for him alone. Still, according to the newspaper, Stakhanov's approach had eventually led to increased productivity by means of better work organization, including specialization and task sequencing.

It has also been said that his record was beaten by Alija Sirotanović of Yugoslavia and Sergej Scemuk of Ukraine.

== Personal life ==
According to a widespread story, Stakhanov was given the name Andrei at birth, but the telegram reporting his record only contained his initial, and the editors of Pravda reported his name as Alexei. Rather than admit such a high-profile mistake, authorities decided to replace his passport and other official documents, changing his name to Alexei. However, his daughter dismissed this as false in a 2012 interview, stating that she had never heard any family members ever call her father Andrei, nor did the name run in the family.

Stakhanov had two partners and six children:

- First partner Yevdokia (Stakhanov met in 1929, but never married) ran away before 1936.
  - Klavdia
  - Viktor
- Second partner and wife Galina (1922–?).
  - Violetta (born 1940)
  - Alla (1943–?)
  - two more children, Vladimir and Emma, died as toddlers

== Legacy ==
- From 1938 to 1947, the city of Zhukovsky, Russia was named Stakhanovo.
- From 15 February 1978 to 12 May 2016, the Ukrainian city of Kadiivka was named Stakhanov.

== See also ==
- List of people awarded the Hero of Socialist Labour
- Lei Feng
- Frank Laskier
- Pavlik Morozov
- Alija Sirotanović
- Wang Jinxi
