= Luhan (river) =

Luhan Lugan
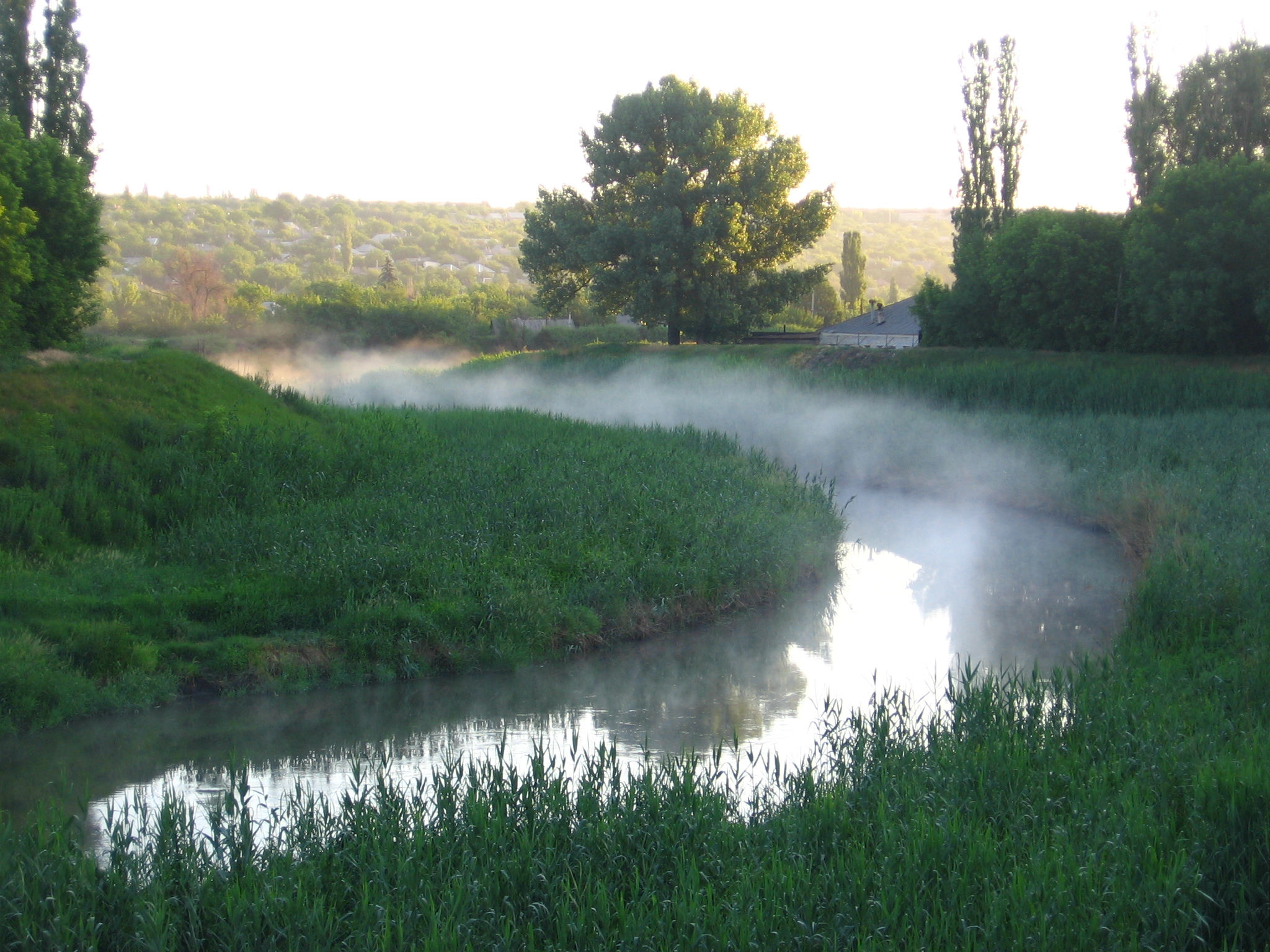
- Luhan near Kamianyi Brid
- Native name: Лугань (Ukrainian); Лугань (Russian)

Location
- Country: Ukraine

Physical characteristics
- Source
  - location: Horlivka
  - coordinates: 48°18′59″N 38°07′22″E
- Mouth: Donets
  - coordinates: 48°37′40″N 39°28′11″E
- Length: 198 km (123 mi)
- Basin size: 3,740 km^{2} (1,440 sq mi)

Basin features
- Progression: Donets→ Don→ Sea of Azov

The Luhan or Lugan (Russian and Ukrainian: Лугань), also known as the Luhanka or Luganka (Луганка), is a river in the Donbas region of Ukraine, a right tributary of the Seversky Donets, in the basin of the Don. It is 198 kilometres (123 mi) long, and has a drainage basin of 3,740 square kilometres (1,440 sq mi). The city of Luhansk, which stands where the river Vilkhivka flows into the Luhan, took its name from the river. The Luhan river itself derives its name to the word "Luh" (Ukrainian: Луг, lit. 'meadow') and referring to the floodplains around it. Zaporozhian Cossacks lived here back in 1630s and 1650s.

The Luhan river rises in the eastern part of Horlivka in Donetsk Oblast.
