= Alchevsk Raion =

Subdivision of Luhansk Oblast, Ukraine

Coordinates: 48°28′N 38°34′E

Alchevsk Raion Алчевський район
- Raion
- Interactive map of Alchevsk Raion
- Country: Ukraine
- Oblast: Luhansk
- Established: 2020
- Admin. center: Alchevsk
- Subdivisions: 3 hromadas

Area
  - Total: 2,006 km^{2} (775 sq mi)

Population (2021)
  - Total: 437,513
  - Density: 218.1/km^{2} (564.9/sq mi)

Alchevsk Raion (Ukrainian: Алчевський район; Russian: Алчевский район) is a prospective raion (district) of Luhansk Oblast, Ukraine. It was formally created in July 2020 as part of the reform of administrative divisions of Ukraine. The center of the raion is in the town of Alchevsk. Population: 437,513 (2021 est.). The area of the raion is occupied by Russia, which continues to use the old, pre-2020 administrative divisions of Ukraine.

== Subdivisions ==
The raion contains three hromadas:

- Alchevsk urban hromada;
- Kadiivka urban hromada;
- Zymohiria urban hromada.
