= Valerii Moshenskyi =

Ukrainian politician and businessman (born 1957)

- Валерій Мошенський
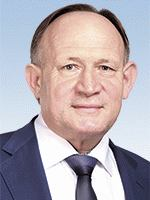
- An official portrait of him from 2012.

People's Deputy of Ukraine
- In office 12 December 2012 – 27 November 2014
- Constituency: Luhansk Oblast, No. 108

Personal details
- Born: Valerii Zakharovych Moshenskyi; 1 June 1957 (age 69) Yashchykove, Ukrainian SSR, Soviet Union
- Party: People's Party; Independent (2012-14); Sovereign European Ukraine faction
- Education: Academy of Labour and Social Relations of the Federation of Trade Unions of Ukraine (2004); National Aviation University (2005)

Valerii Zakharovych Moshenskyi (Ukrainian: Валерій Захарович Мошенський; born 1 June 1957) is a Ukrainian politician and businessman who served as a People's Deputy of Ukraine in the Verkhovna Rada representing the 7th convocation from 2012 to its premature end in 2014.

== Early life ==
Moshenskyi was born on 1 June 1957 in the city of Yashchykove, then part of the Ukrainian SSR in the Soviet Union. Upon graduating from secondary school, he immediately entered the workforce, starting as an installer at the Yenakiieve Special Administration No. 116 offices in 1974. Moshenskyi only stayed there for a year before moving to the capital of Kyiv to work as an electric welder at SMBU-28 of the trust "Kyivmiskbud-6" for a few months. He left the trust to complete his mandatory military service in the Soviet Army, which he completed in November 1977. Upon returning to Ukraine, he became a mechanic-fitter at SMBU-28 of "Kyivmiskbud-6" for nearly a decade, from 1978 to 1987, before leaving to briefly work as a molder at Molding Shop No. 1 at the Holokyivmiskbud Reinforced Concrete Products Plant.

Sometime later, he graduated from the Academy of Labour and Social Relations of the Federation of Trade Unions of Ukraine with a specialisation as an economist and also from the National Aviation University with a specialisation as a civil engineer.

== Business career ==
Moshenskyi first became a businessman in March 1989, when he was appointed chairman of the "Progress" cooperative. He remained chairman for six years, until December 1995, when he moved to become director of the "Planeta-M" LLC. Moshenskyi remained chairman of Planeta for a while, even when it was renamed and privatised to "Planeta-L" from 1998 to 2002. He only left briefly from 2002 to 2003 to become director of "Ukrspetsbud", but returned back to Planeta afterwards, where he was appointed as Chief Manager for Commercial Operations and Management. He was promoted back to his old position of director/chairman of the board of "Planeta-Bud" in 2008, a post he has held since. Planeta, as of 2012, is engaged in the construction of facilities for Ukrzaliznytsia and the Kyiv Metro.

Moshenskyi has since set up a charitable foundation, "Valerii Moshenskyi Foundation", which opened up some playgrounds, including in the village of Bilotusk (Novopskov Raion) in 2016.

== Political career ==
In 2008, Moshenskyi first entered politics when he was elected to the Kyiv City Council. In the council, he represented the Lytvyn Bloc, and was chairman of its faction. In 2012, with Moshenskyi planning to run for the Verkhovna Rada, it was planned that Serhii Kostyuk, the head of the Darnytskyi district branch of the People's Party of the bloc would replace him in the council. Moshenskyi did eventually announce that he was running for the 7th convocation in constituency No. 108 as an independent but affiliated with the People's Party. No. 108 was centered in Khrustalnyi, but also included some parts of other raions. The elections in the constituency were slightly competitive, with the incumbent being Volodymyr Landyk, the brother of fellow parliamentarian Valentyn Landyk. Volodymyr was part of the Party of Regions and attracted significant attention previously due to the trial of his son. The other main candidate, besides Moshenskyi, was Yurii Ternikov, the Chairman of the Supervisory Board of the Perevalsk Trading House, who was also associated with the Party of Regions informally. During the votes, Moshenskyi was immediately declared in the lead with a few ballots counted. During the counting, various lawsuits were filed about the non-admission of observers. Moshenskyi was eventually certified as having won the race with 35.19% of the vote (31,758 people), with Ternikov trailing slightly behind him with 32.97% (29,752 people). It was noted that Moshenskyi won the majority vote in most of Khrustalnyi while Ternikov won most of Perevalsk Raion.

Upon joining the Rada, Moshenskyi became Secretary of the Committee on Transport and Communications and also became a member of the independent faction. However, in November 2012, he wrote an application to join the Party of Regions alongside Volodymyr Struk of the 104th (also Luhansk Oblast). The following month it was confirmed that Struk had joined the Party of Regions, although Moshenskyi did not and remained an independent. During the convocation, he was not present for the consideration of the European Union integration bills in October 2013. During the subsequent outbreak of Euromaidan, Moshenskyi voted for the so-called "laws on dictatorship". However, he later alleged that he did not vote for them and that during counting, the Party of Regions member Volodymyr Oliinyk had simply counted him. Thus, he was one of nine independent MPs who registered the bill No. 4007, which proposed repealing some of the laws. In February 2014, he officially joined the Sovereign European Ukraine faction. Towards the end of his mandate, with the outbreak of the War in the Donbas and his constituency, including Khrustalnyi, coming under the control of the forces of the pro-Russian, separatist Luhansk People's Republic, Moshenskyi voted in favour of resolutions No. 5115 and 5116, which would have changed administrative and territorial structures of Luhansk Oblast to relocate them to Ukrainian-controlled territory in the north of the oblast.

Moshenskyi then attempted to run for re-election in the subsequent snap 2014 Ukrainian parliamentary elections for constituency No. 114, located to the north with its seat in Bilovodsk, which was at the time Ukrainian-controlled. He was ultimately not selected, with the self-nominated candidate Yuriy Harbuz winning instead with 25.56% of the vote. Moshenskyi himself received third place, trailing behind Tigran Kocharyan of Strong Ukraine. In the subsequent 2019 Ukrainian parliamentary elections, he once again tried to run in No. 114 as an independent, but was once again not selected.

== Personal life ==
He is married to Maria Petrovna, the president of the charitable foundation "Planeta-Svit". Together, they have a son, Sehii, who was born in 1979. As of 2015, his wife owned the largest house on the Obolonska Naberezhna of Kyiv, which she had obtained in 2011.

== Honours and awards ==
Moshenskyi has been awarded the following honours:

- Order of Merit, II degree (2009)
- Order of Merit, I degree (2012)
