= Kypuche =

City in Luhansk Oblast, Ukraine

Kypuche Кипуче
- City
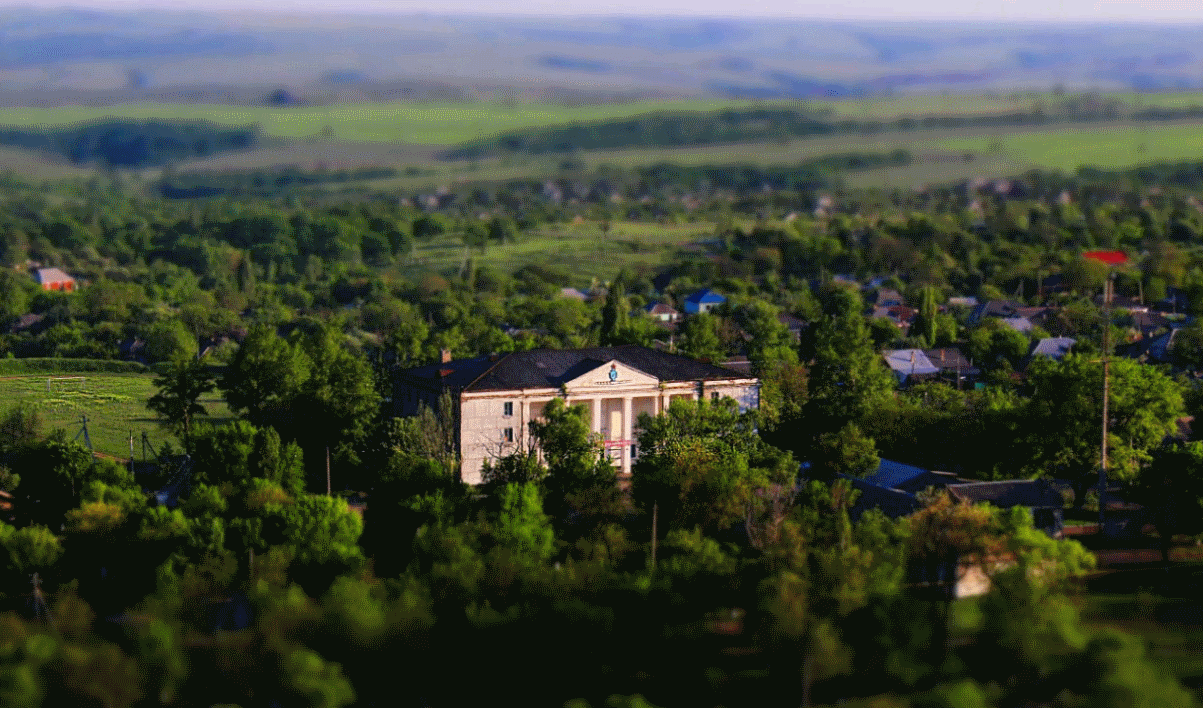
- Palace of Culture

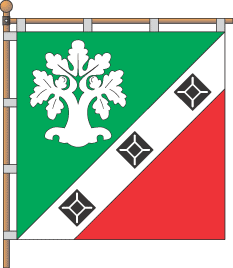
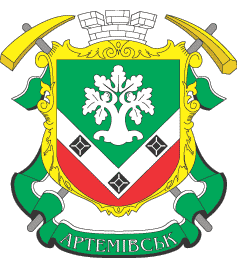
- Flag Coat of arms
- Interactive map of Kypuche
- Location within Ukraine Location within Luhansk Oblast
- Coordinates: 48°26′20″N 38°43′3″E
- Country: Ukraine
- Oblast: Luhansk Oblast
- Raion: Alchevsk Raion
- Hromada: Alchevsk urban hromada
- Founded: 1910/1911
- City status: 1964

Population (2022)
  - Total: 7,162
- Area code: (+380)
- Vehicle registration: BB / 13
- Climate: Dfb

Kypuche (Ukrainian: Кипуче; Russian: Кипучее, romanized: Kipucheye) or Artemivsk (Ukrainian: Артемівськ; Russian: Артёмовск, romanized: Artyomovsk) is a city in Alchevsk urban hromada, Alchevsk Raion, Luhansk Oblast (region), Ukraine. Population: 7,162 (2022 estimate), 7,506 (2013 est.).

It is situated in the historical and economic Donbas region of eastern Ukraine.

The city has been under the control of Russia and its proxy, the Luhansk People's Republic, since early 2014.

== History ==
The city was founded as Katerynivka (Ukrainian: Катеринівка) in 1910 or 1911, in connection with the construction of nearby coal mines. Coal mining began in 1913. During the times of the Soviet Union, it was renamed Artemivsk after the Bolshevik figure Comrade Artyom, and assigned to Perevalsk Raion. In 1938, Artemivsk received urban-type settlement status.

During World War II, Artemivsk was occupied by Nazi Germany beginning on July 12, 1942. Nine residents of the town were tortured by the occupiers, and another 177 were deported for forced labor to Germany The Nazis "methodically destroyed" the town's infrastructure, burning down buildings and flooding mines. The town was eventually liberated on September 2, 1943 by the 315th Rifle Division of the Red Army, and was rebuilt.

In 1964, Artemivsk received city status.

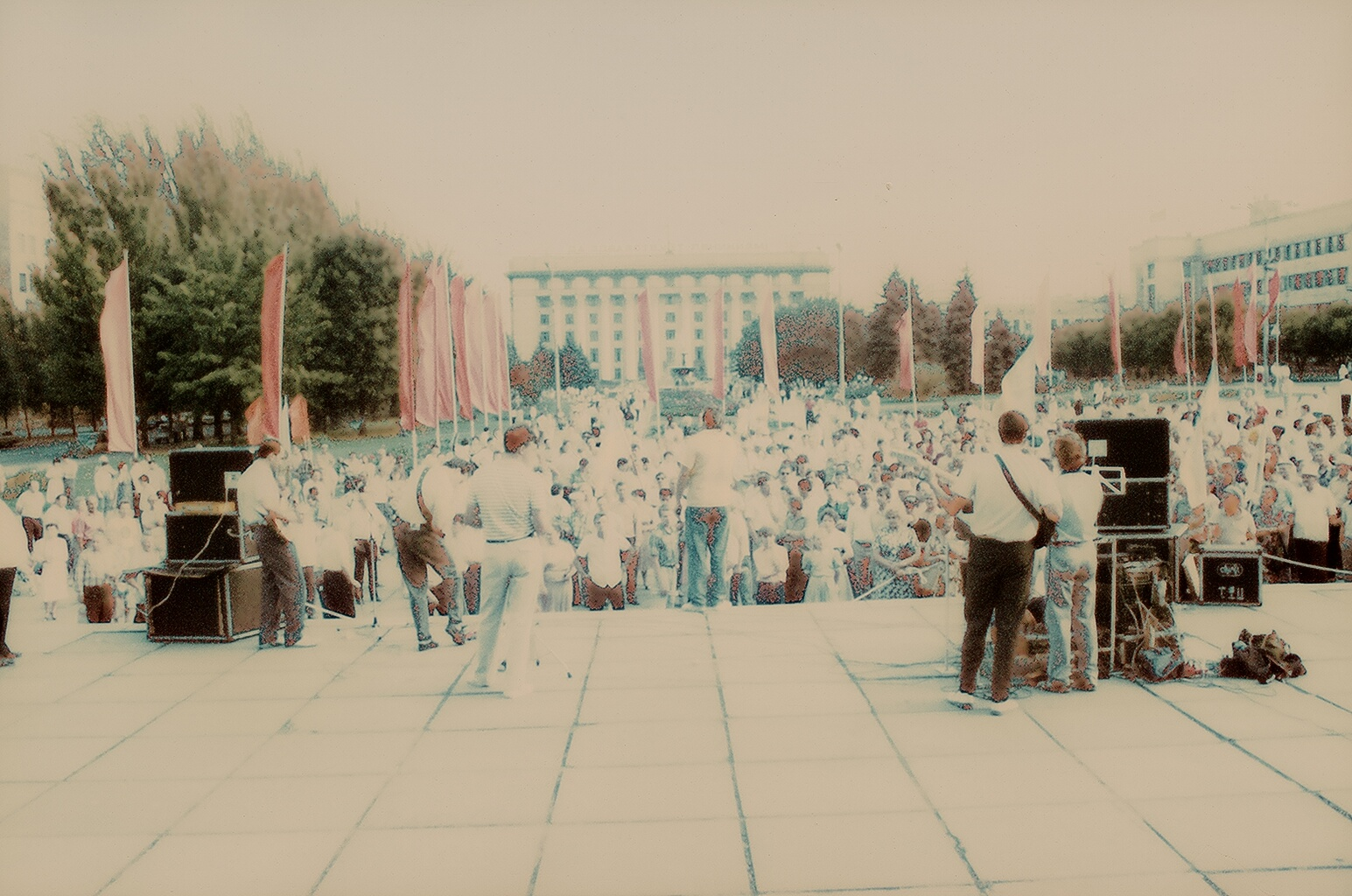
Miners' rally near the Ministry of Coal Industry of Ukraine in Artemivsk, 1990

Ukraine became independent from the Soviet Union in 1991. The city has been under de-facto Russian control since the spring of 2014 as part of the Luhansk People's Republic (LPR).

On May 12, 2016, Ukraine's national parliament, the Verkhovna Rada, restored the name of Kypuche as part of the country's decommunization process. In 2020, the Ukrainian government abolished Perevalsk Raion, and transferred Kypuche to the newly created Alchevsk Raion.

In September 2022, Russia declared the annexation of Luhansk Oblast along with three other Ukrainian regions.

== Demographics ==
In 2000, Artemivsk had a population of 10,500 people. It is a multiethnic city, with populations of Ukrainians, Russians, Belarusians, Tajiks, Armenians, Poles, and Jews, among other groups, living in it. The exact composition was as follows:

Ethnic groups in Kypuche
	percent
Ukrainians	51.43%
Russians	44.88%
Belarusians	1.65%
Tatars	0.63%
Azerbaijanis	0.15%
Poles	0.13%
Moldovans	0.13%
other	1.00%

== Notable people ==
- Lidiya Ponomarenko (1922–2013), Ukrainian historian
- Volodymyr Shcherban (born 1950), Ukrainian politician

== Economy ==
Kypuche's major industry is coal mining. Southeast of the town, the important power grid node Donbass-750 is located.
