= Bile (disambiguation) =

Bile is a greenish-yellow alkaline fluid secreted from the liver of most vertebrates.

Bile may also refer to:

== People ==
- Abdi Bile (born 1962), Somali middle-distance runner
- Mingo Bile (born 1987), Angolan footballer
- Moni Bilé, Cameroonian musician
- Pastor Micha Ondó Bile (born 1952), Equatorial Guinean cabinet minister and ambassador
- William I of Bimbia (birthname Bile), 19th century Cameroonian ruler

== Places ==
- Bile River, Guam
- Birecik, Turkey, a city called Bile during the Crusades
- Bile, Luhansk Oblast, a town in Ukraine
- Bile, Odesa Oblast, the only village on Snake Island in Ukraine
- Lake Bile, a lake in the Odesa Oblast in Ukraine
- Bile, Croatia, a village near Novi Vinodolski

== Other uses ==
- Belenus, a god of Celtic mythology
- Bile (Irish legend), a legendary ancestor of the Irish people
- Bile (band), a New York industrial metal band
- Bile language, a Southern Bantoid Jarawan language of Nigeria
- Black bile, a humor in ancient and pre-modern medicine
- Yellow bile, a humor in ancient and pre-modern medicine
- Birmingham Laptop Ensemble (BiLE)

== See also ==
- Biles, a surname
