= 11th Separate Motorized Infantry Battalion (Ukraine) =

- Coat of arms of the battalion
- Active: May 4, 2014 – present
- Allegiance: Ukraine
- Branch: 59th Motorized Brigade
- Type: Mechanized infantry
- Role: Offensive actions
- Garrison/HQ: Podilsk, Odesa Oblast
- Engagements: War in Donbas: Battle of Debaltseve; 2022 Russian Invasion of Ukraine: Pokrovsk offensive

Commanders
- Current commander: Valeryi Vovk

11th Separate Motorized Infantry Battalion (Ukrainian: 11-й окремий мотопіхотний батальйон, romanized: 11-i okremyi motopikhotnyi batalion), formerly known as the 11th Territorial Defense Battalion "Kyivan Rus", is a battalion of the Ukrainian Ground Forces created in 2014.

== History ==
On March 19, 2014, Operation Command North established the 11th Territorial Defense Battalion, nicknamed "Kyivan Rus". By May 4, the troops for the unit were approved, marking the beginning of this battalion. For the next month, the personnel were trained at the 169th Training Centre in the city of Desna.

=== War in Donbas ===
After completing training, the troops of the battalion were then stationed for duty at roadblocks in Sloviansk, where they routinely identify and hand over pro-Russian separatists to the Ministry of Internal Affairs.

On August 9, 2014, the battalion's recon unit successfully captured 4 militants at the train station at Fashchivka. They were later handed over to the Security Service of Ukraine.

On August 15, some soldiers of the battalion were ambushed in the village of Maloivanivka, near Zorynsk. Two members of the battalion were killed, and another two were wounded.

In the early morning of August 19, units of the Russian Ground Forces used BM-21 Grad rockets to fire on the positions of the battalion. As a result, 10 soldiers were wounded, 60% of the equipment, including 26 automobile equipments, were destroyed.

From September 20 to 27, the battalion repelled attacks on checkpoints in the village of Nikishyne, about 10 kilometers east of Debaltseve. The Ukrainian defenses in the area stretched for about 37 kilometres (23 mi).

=== Re-organization ===
On October 21, 2014, a directive was given to reorganize the battalion from Territorial Defense into a unit of the Ukrainian Ground Forces, known as the 11th Separate Motorized Infantry Battalion. This battalion was originally subordinate to the 72nd Mechanized Brigade, but was later transferred to the 59th Motorized Brigade.

=== Russian invasion of Ukraine ===
On August 26, 2024, having suffered heavy losses, the battalion was forced to retreat from the village of Karlivka under the threat of encirclement. As a result, the unit commander was removed from his post.

== See also ==
- Ukrainian territorial defence battalions
- Special Police Forces (Ukraine)
