= Sieverne =

Sieverne (Ukrainian: Сєверне) may refer to the following places in Ukraine:

Crimea

- Sieverne, Bilohirsk Raion Raion, Crimea, village in Bilohirsk Raion
- Sieverne, Chornomorske Raion, Crimea, village in Chornomorske Raion
- Sieverne, Rozdolne Raion, Crimea, village in Rozdolne Raion

Donetsk Oblast

- Sieverne (urban-type settlement), Donetsk Oblast, urban-type settlement in Volnovakha Raion
- Sieverne, Pokrovsk Raion, Donetsk Oblast, rural settlement in Pokrovsk Raion
