= Biles =

Biles is a surname. Notable people with the name include:

- Daniel Biles (born 1952), American judge
- Ed Biles (1931–2020), American football coach and player
- George Biles (1900–1987), British sign painter
- Keith Biles, British politician
- Martin Biles (1919–2017), American javelin thrower
- Oliver Biles (born 1990), British actor
- Rasheem Biles (born 2005), American football player
- Simone Biles Owens (born 1997), American artistic gymnast
- William Biles (1644–1710), American judge

== See also ==
- Bies (surname)
- Bile (disambiguation)
