= Horodyshche, Alchevsk Raion, Luhansk Oblast =

Urban locality in Luhansk Oblast, Ukraine

Horodyshche Городище
- Rural settlement
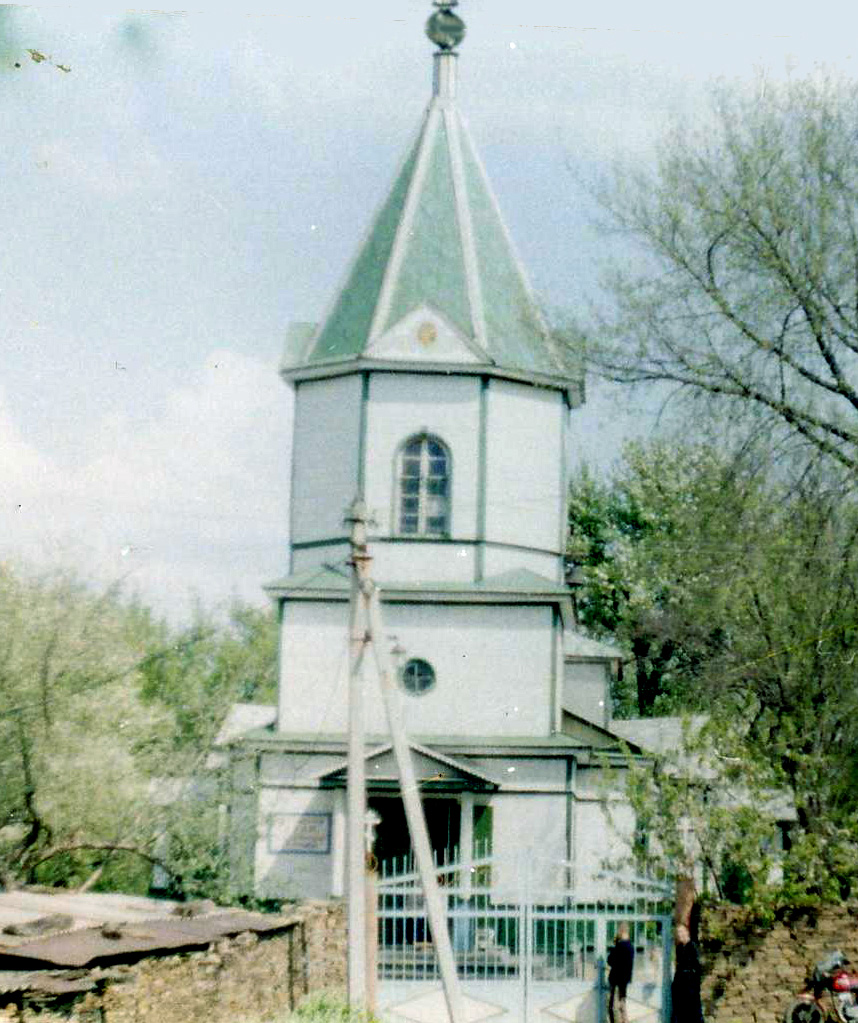

- Location of Horodyshche within Ukraine Horodyshche (Ukraine)
- Coordinates: 48°19′15″N 38°38′07″E
- Country: Ukraine
- Oblast: Luhansk Oblast
- Raion: Alchevsk Raion
- Hromada: Alchevsk urban hromada
- Founded: 1761
- Elevation: 191 m (627 ft)

Population (2022)
  - Total: 2,377
- Time zone: UTC+2 (EET)
  - Summer (DST): UTC+3 (EEST)
- Postal code: 94343
- Area code: +380 6441

Horodyshche (Ukrainian: Городище) is a rural settlement in Alchevsk urban hromada, Alchevsk Raion (district), Luhansk Oblast (region), Ukraine. Population: 2,377 (2022 estimate)

Until 18 July 2020, Horodyshche was located in Perevalsk Raion. The raion was abolished in July 2020 as part of the administrative reform of Ukraine, which reduced the number of raions of Luhansk Oblast to eight, of which only four were controlled by the government. The area of Perevalsk Raion was merged into Alchevsk Raion. However, the area of raion is controlled by the Luhansk People's Republic, which continues to use the old, pre-2020 administrative divisions of Ukraine.

== Demographics ==
Native language distribution as of the Ukrainian Census of 2001:

- Ukrainian: 2.17%
- Russian: 97.8%
- Others 0.21%
