= Nikolai Ilyin (sniper) =

Soviet World War II sniper

- Native name: Николай Яковлевич Ильин
- Born: 25 June 1922; Chernukhino, Ukrainian SSR (located in present-day Perevalsk Raion, Luhansk Oblast)
- Died: 4 August 1943 (aged 21) Yastrebovo, Kursk Oblast, RSFSR, USSR
- Cause of death: Machine Gun Burst
- Buried: Mamayev Kurgan
- Allegiance: Soviet Union
- Branch: Red Army
- Service years: 1942–1943
- Rank: Starshina
- Conflicts: World War II †
- Awards: Hero of the Soviet Union

Nikolai Yakovlevich Ilyin (Russian: Николай Яковлевич Ильин; 25 June 1922 — 4 August 1943) was one of the top Soviet snipers of World War II. Awarded the title Hero of the Soviet Union on 8 February 1943 for his first 216 kills, by the time he was killed in action later that year his tally reached 494, thus being considered as one of the deadliest snipers in history.

== Early life ==
Ilyin was born to a Russian family in Chornukhyne village on 25 June 1922. After graduating from secondary school, he worked as a mechanic at the Debaltsevo-Sortirovochny depot in Donbass.

== Sniper feats ==
He entered the Red Army in 1941 soon after the Nazi invasion of the Soviet Union, and started off as a machine gunner before mastering his sniper skills. He fought in the intense battle of Stalingrad, and became a deputy political commissar in the 50th Guards Rifle Regiment. He showed himself to be a skilled sniper, killing 95 Nazis during eleven days of battle. He was awarded his first military award, the Order of the Red Banner on 29 September 1942, and on 8 February 1943 he was awarded the title Hero of the Soviet Union for killing a total of 216 Nazis, including 95 that he killed in the course of eleven days. For his work as a sniper he was awarded a personalized sniper rifle named after Hero of the Soviet Union Khusen Andrukhaev.

== Death ==
On 4 August 1943, Ilyin was killed by a machine gun burst near the City of Yastrebovo, outside Belgorod. He finished with a tally of 494, (Note: Some sources report he killed 459 Nazi soldiers and officers, including 70 enemy snipers.) making him one of the best snipers of World War II. His personal sniper rifle was given to sniper Afanasy Gordienko. He was buried in Nikolskoye in present day Belgorodsky District, Belgorod Oblast.
