= Snizhne =

City in Donetsk Oblast, Ukraine

Snizhne Сніжне
- City
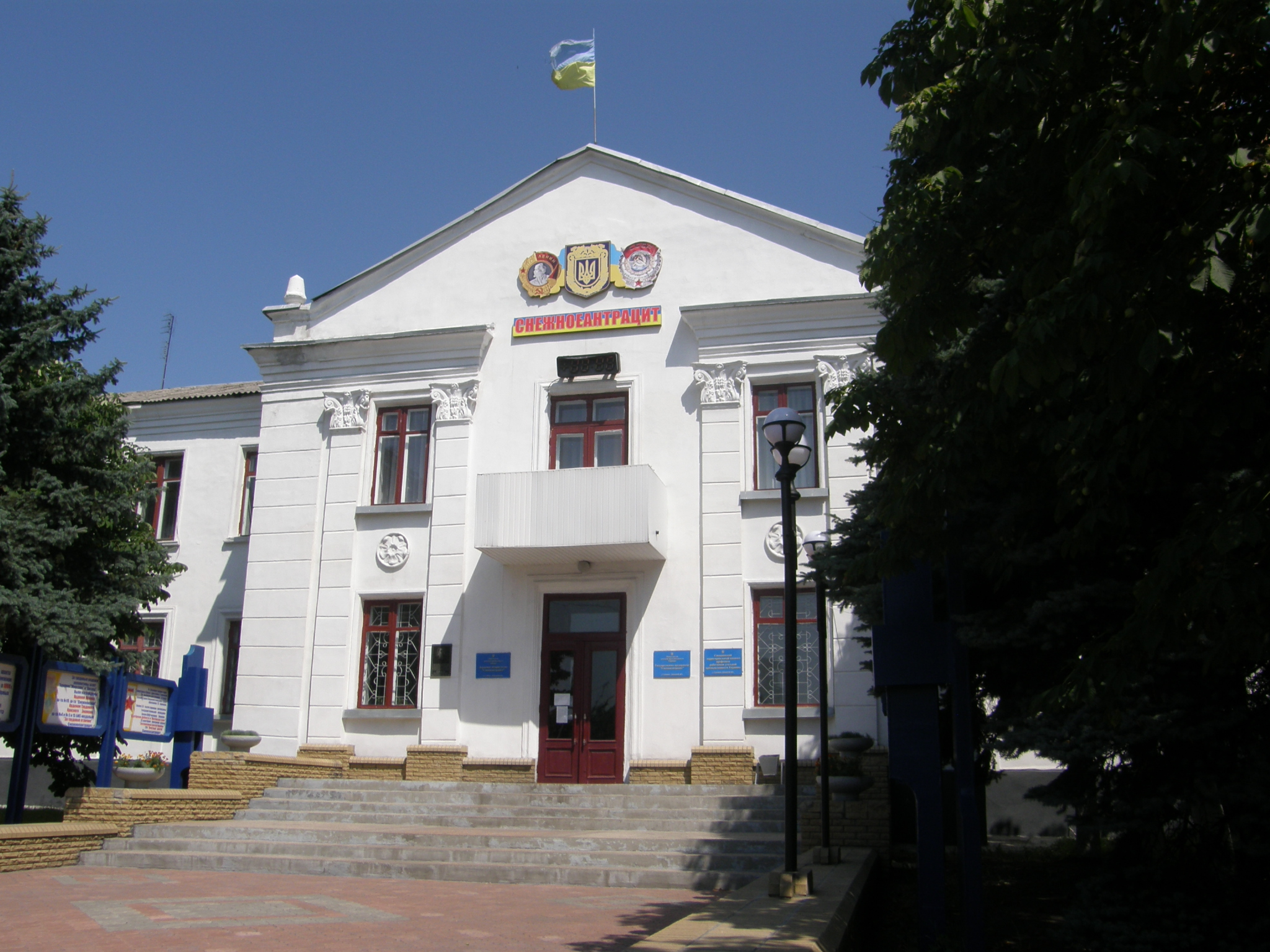
- Mining company office

- Flag Coat of arms
- Interactive map of Snizhne
- Location within Donetsk Oblast Location within Ukraine
- Coordinates: 48°01′41.8″N 38°45′56.2″E
- Country: Ukraine
- Oblast: Donetsk Oblast
- Raion: Horlivka Raion
- Hromada: Snizhne urban hromada
- Founded: 1784
- Incorporated: 1938

Area
  - Total: 87.2 km^{2} (33.7 sq mi)

Population (2011)
  - Total: 49,564
- Climate: Dfb
- Website: http://www.snezh-dnr.wmsite.ru/

Snizhne (Ukrainian: Сніжне, IPA: [s⁽ʲ⁾n⁽ʲ⁾iʒˈnɛ]) or Snezhnoye (Russian: Снежное), formerly known as Vasylivka (Ukrainian: Василівка; Russian: Васильевка, romanized: Vasil'yevka) until 1864, is a city in Horlivka Raion, Donetsk Oblast, Ukraine. The eastern edge of Snizhne is adjacent to administrative border of Luhansk Oblast. Its population is 45,767 (2022 estimate).

== History ==
The settlement was established in 1784 as a "winter place" Vasylivka (Vasilyevka) by Don Cossacks and was part of the Taganrog city municipality. In 1864 it was renamed as Snizhne/Snezhnoye which literally means Snowy.

During the 2014 pro-Russian unrest in Ukraine the town was held by separatists. On 15 July 2014, rockets from an unidentified aircraft struck the town hitting an apartment building and a tax office, leaving at least eleven people dead and eight injured. Separatists blamed the Ukrainian Air Force for the attack, but Ukrainian sources denied it and stated that since the incident where an An-26 plane was shot down on 14 July 2014, they have carried out no flights there. Instead they blamed Russian jets.

After the downing of Malaysia Airlines Flight 17 on 17 July 2014, a YouTube video and photo emerged with citizen journalists claiming the material was from Snizhne and showed a Buk missile launcher. In September 2016 a Joint Investigation Team confirmed that the plane had been downed by a 9M38 BUK missile launched from a rebel-controlled area near the town of Pervomaiske, 6 km (3.7 mi) south of Snizhne.

Fighting for the control of the town between the separatists and the Ukrainian army broke out on 28 July 2014. Snizhne remained under the effective control of the self-proclaimed Donetsk People's Republic.

== Demographics ==
As of the 2001 Ukrainian Census, Snizhne had a population of 58,587 inhabitants. In terms of ethnic groups living in the city, ethnic Ukrainians constitute a majority in the city, accounting for a little bit more than half of the population. Russians are the largest minority group, making up over 40% of the population. Smaller minorities are Belarusians and Tatars. Russian is the lingua franca in the city.

The exact ethnic and linguistic composition of the population at the time of the census was as follows:

Ethnic groups in Snizhne
	percent
Ukrainians	51.33%
Russians	45.07%
Belarusians	0.96%
Tatars	0.89%
Armenians	0.21%
Azeris	0.16%
Ukrainian Greeks	0.15%
Moldovans	0.10%
Georgians	0.07%
others	1.06%

Native languages in Snizhne
	percent
Russian	84.1%
Ukrainian	14.8%
Armenian	0.1%
Belarusian	0.1%
others	0.5%

== Economy ==
- Snizhneantratsyt
- Snizhne Engineering Factory (a branch of Motor Sich)
- Snizhnianskkhimmash, a factory of chemical engineering
- Sofyino-Brodska train station

== Notable people from Snizhne ==
- Olena Mokrenchuk (born 1967), Ukrainian journalist, political activist and military officer
- Pavel Morozenko (1939-1991), Soviet actor of Ukrainian ethnicity
- Roman Pylypchuk (born 1967), Ukrainian football manager and former player

== Gallery ==
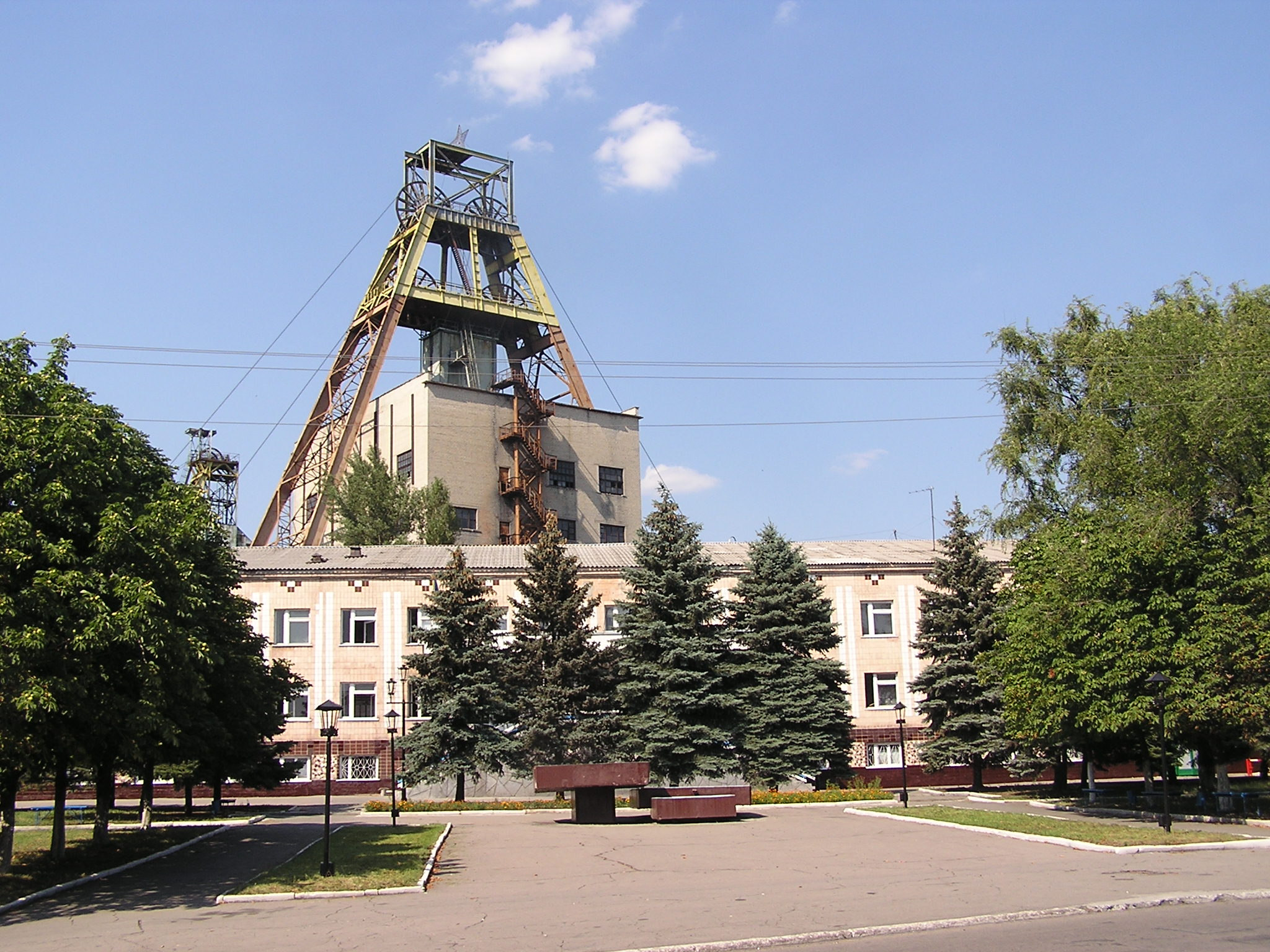
Mine № 9

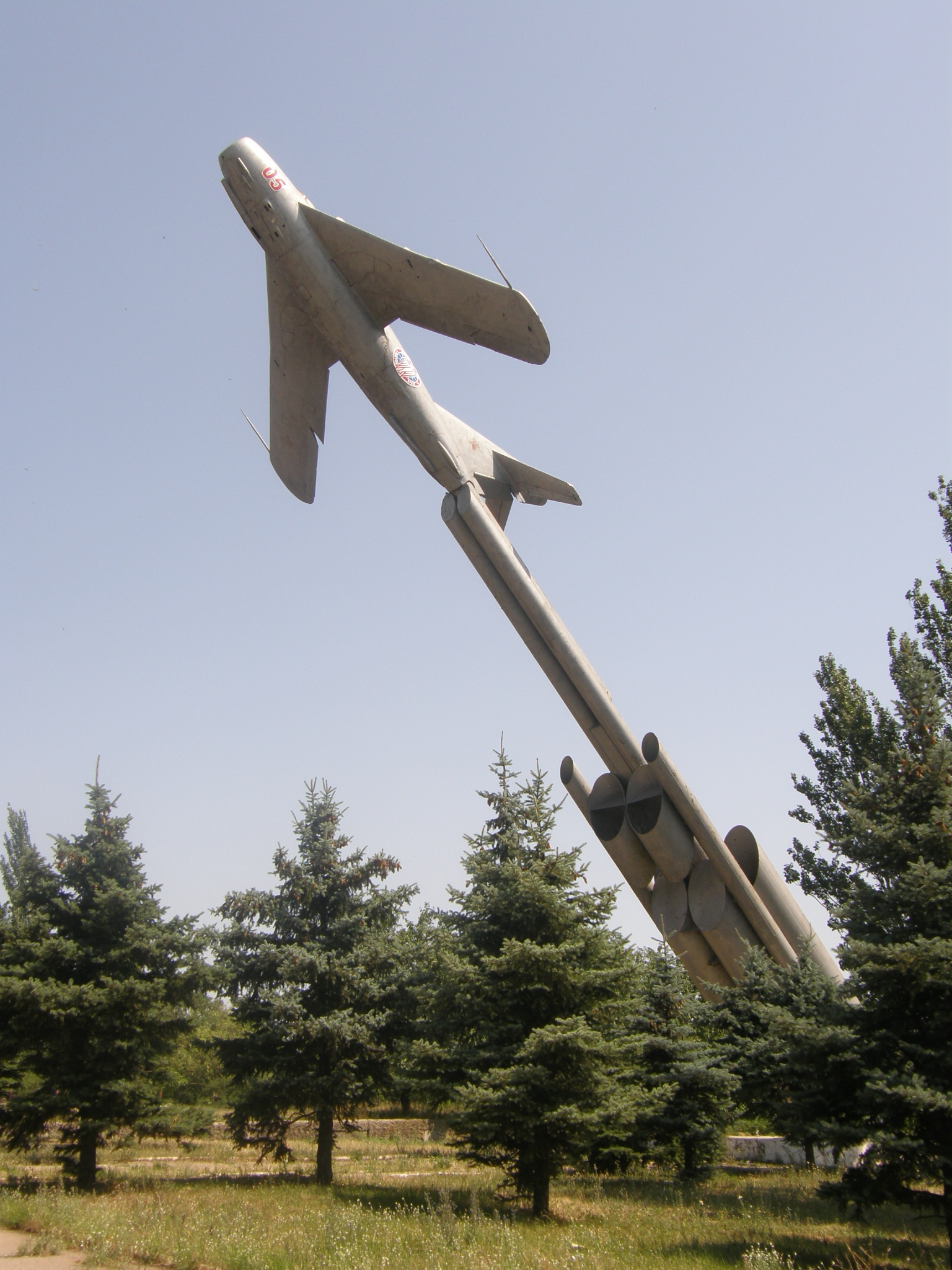
Yuri Gagarin monument

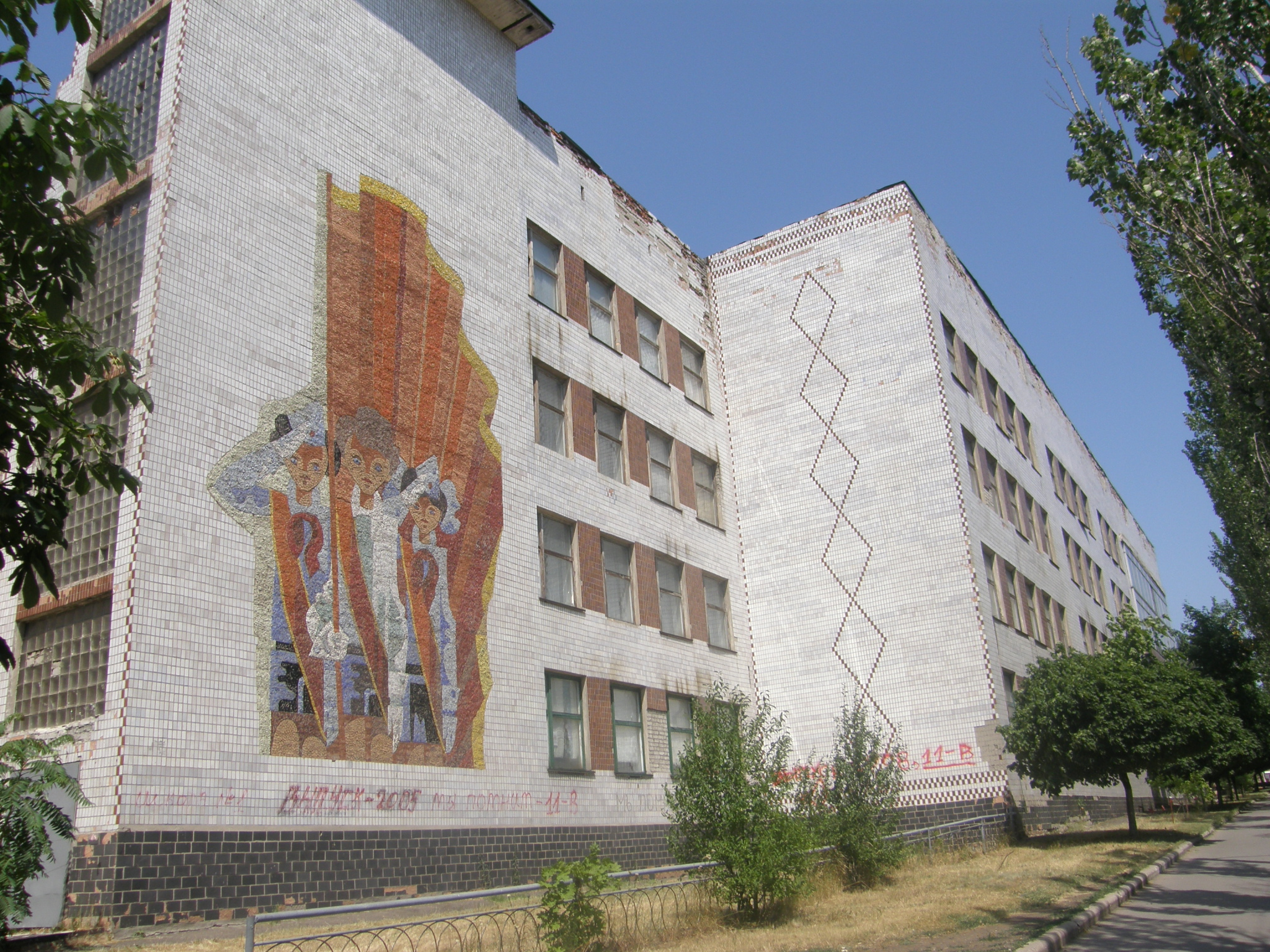
School №1

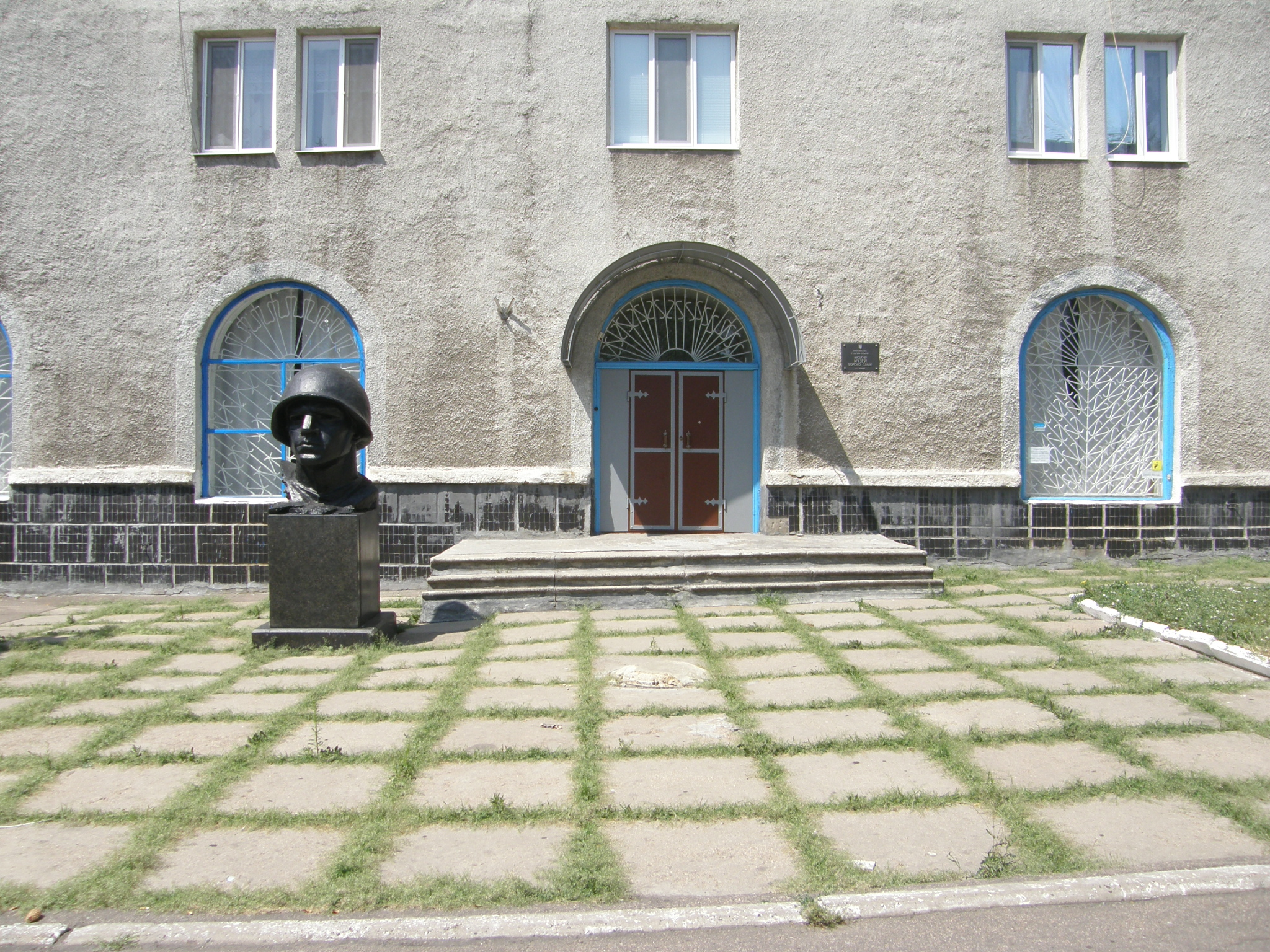
Military museum

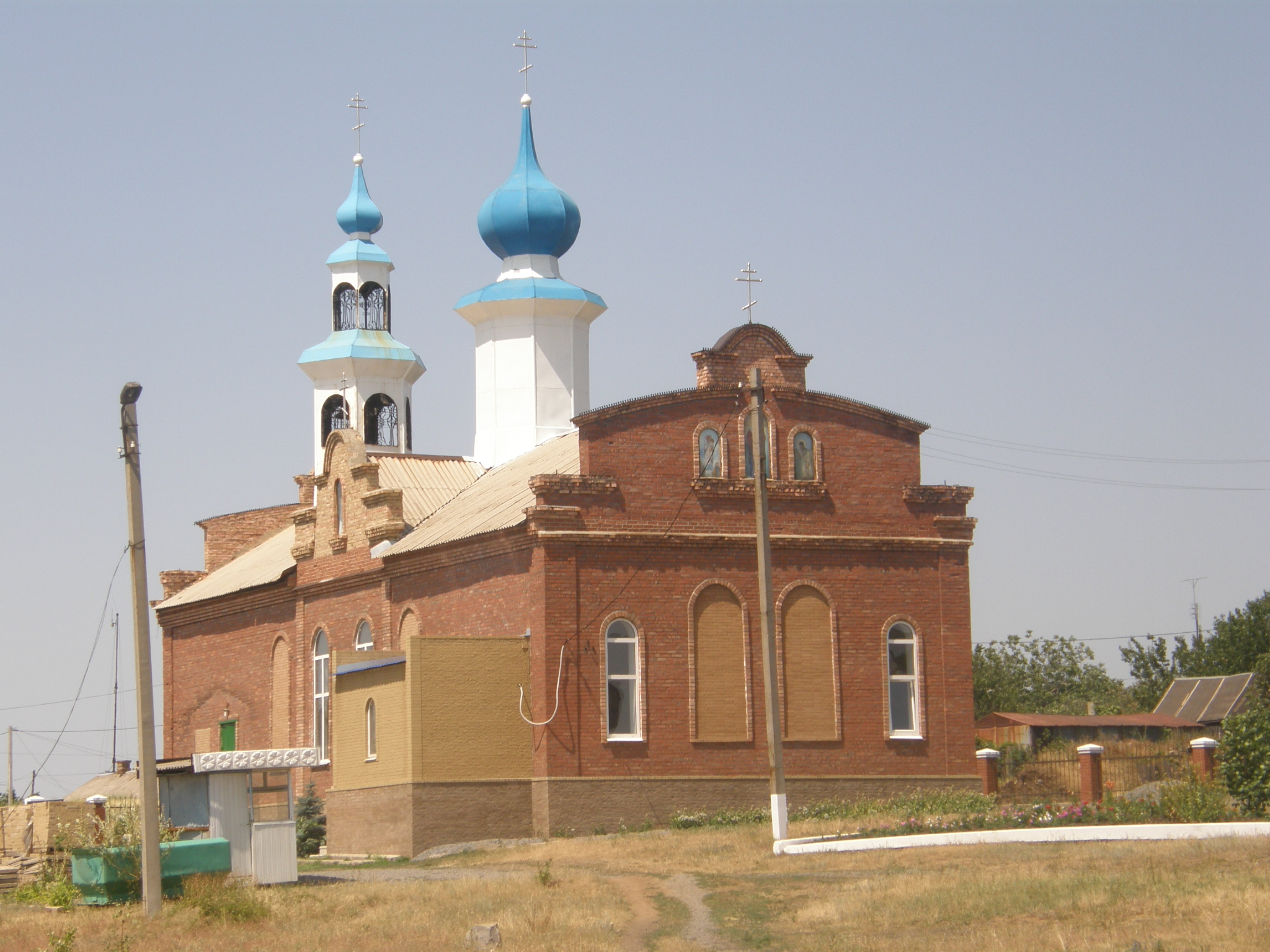
Church

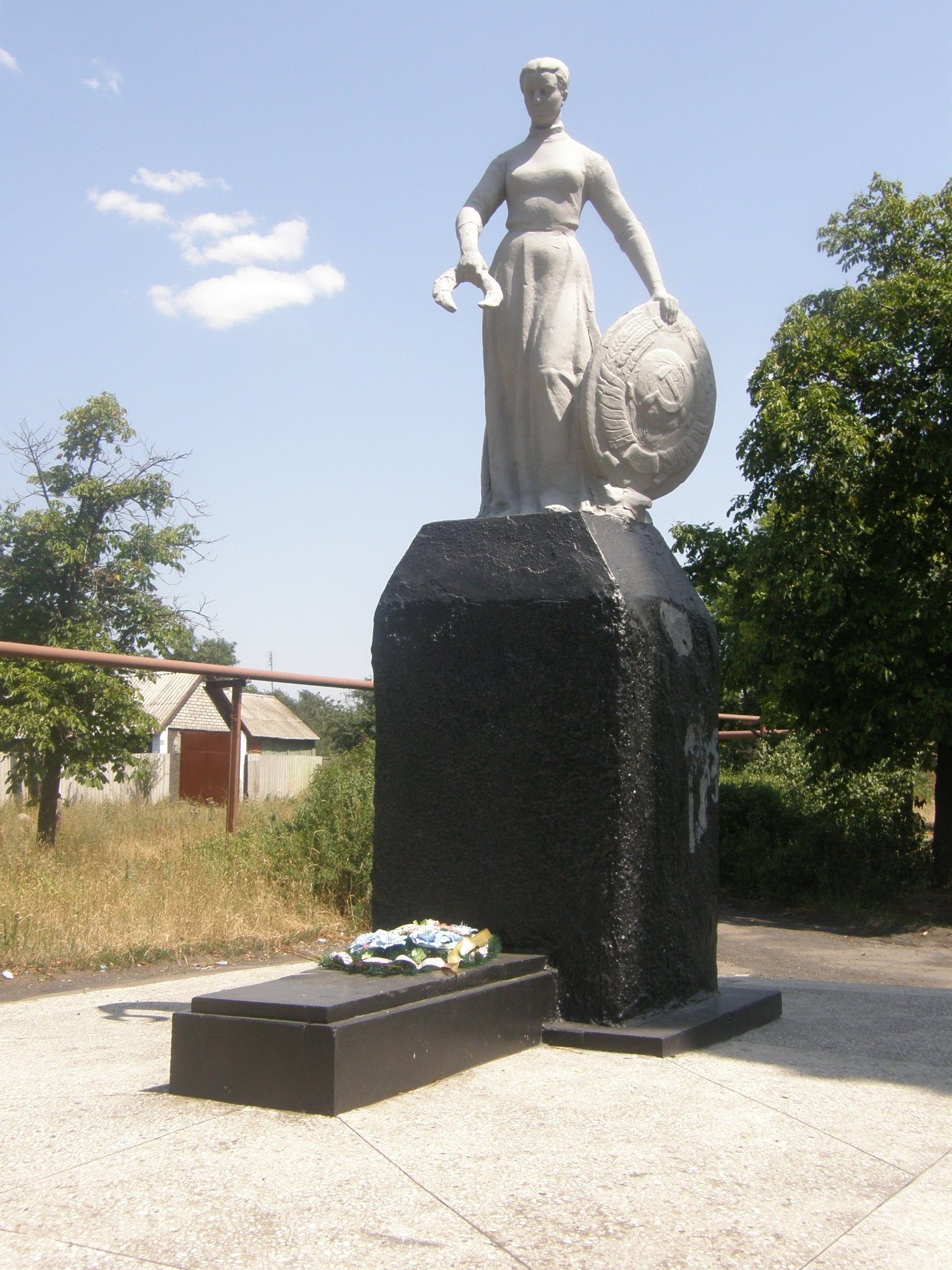
Monument

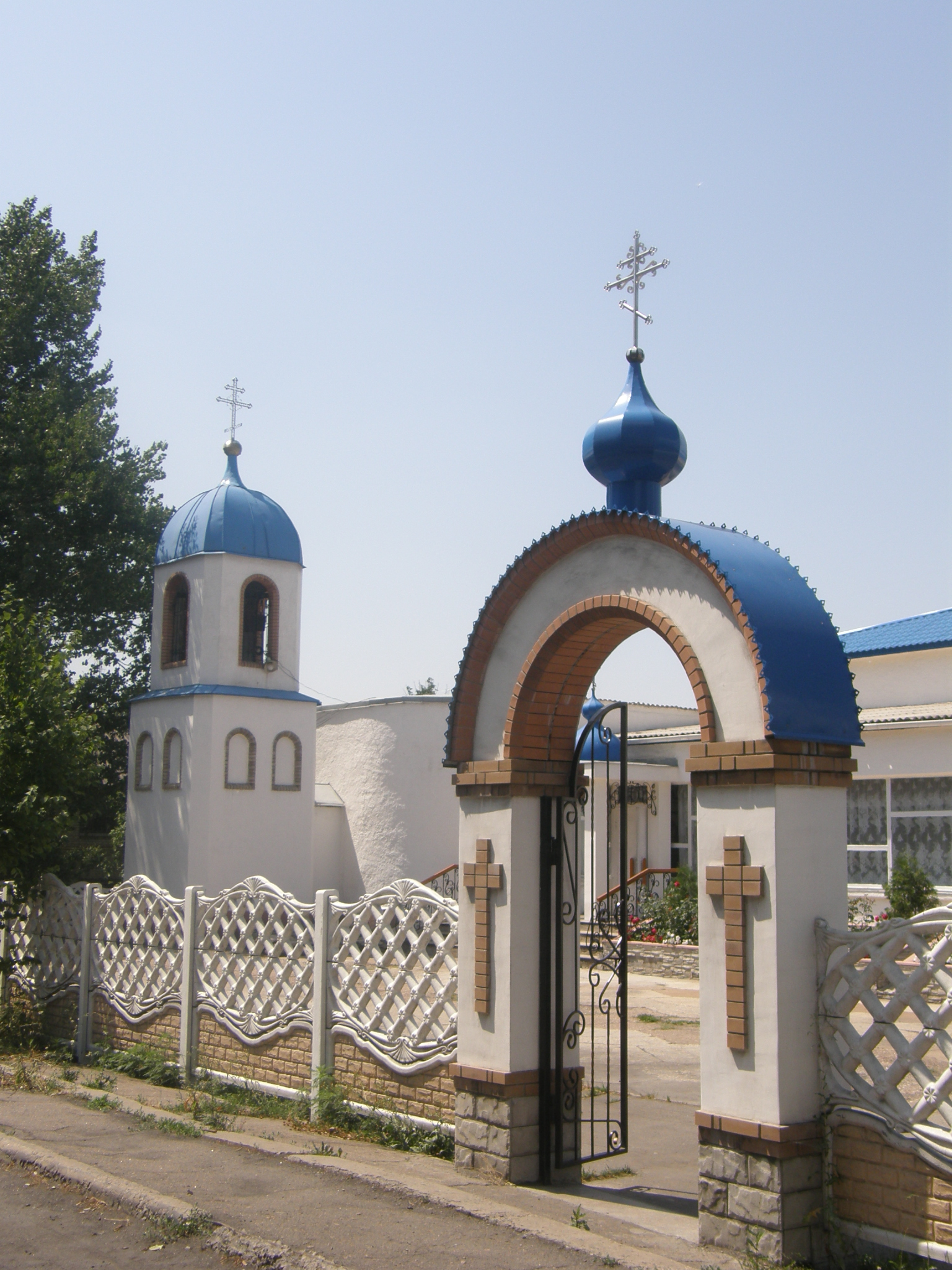
St. Dmytro Church

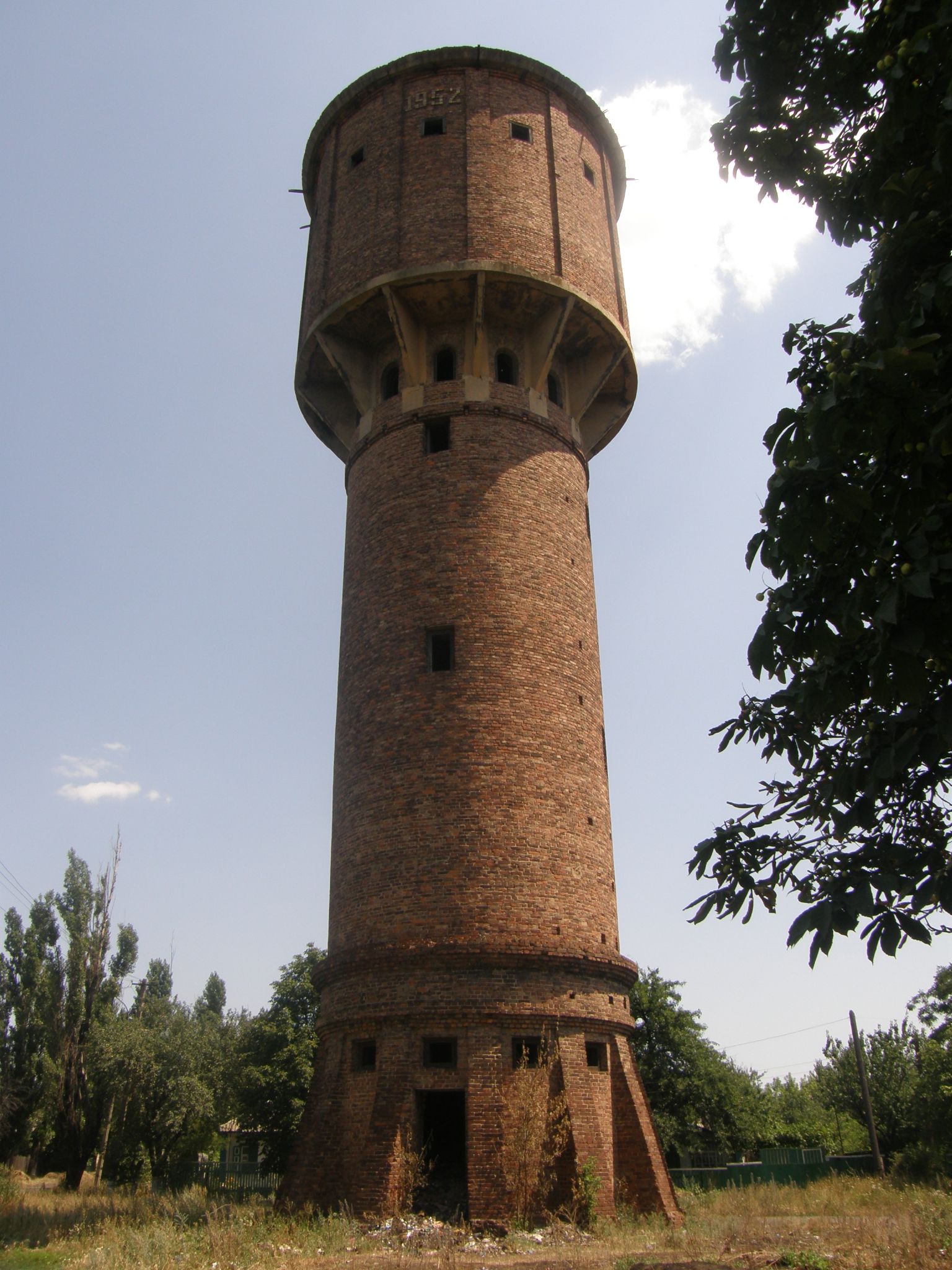
Water tower

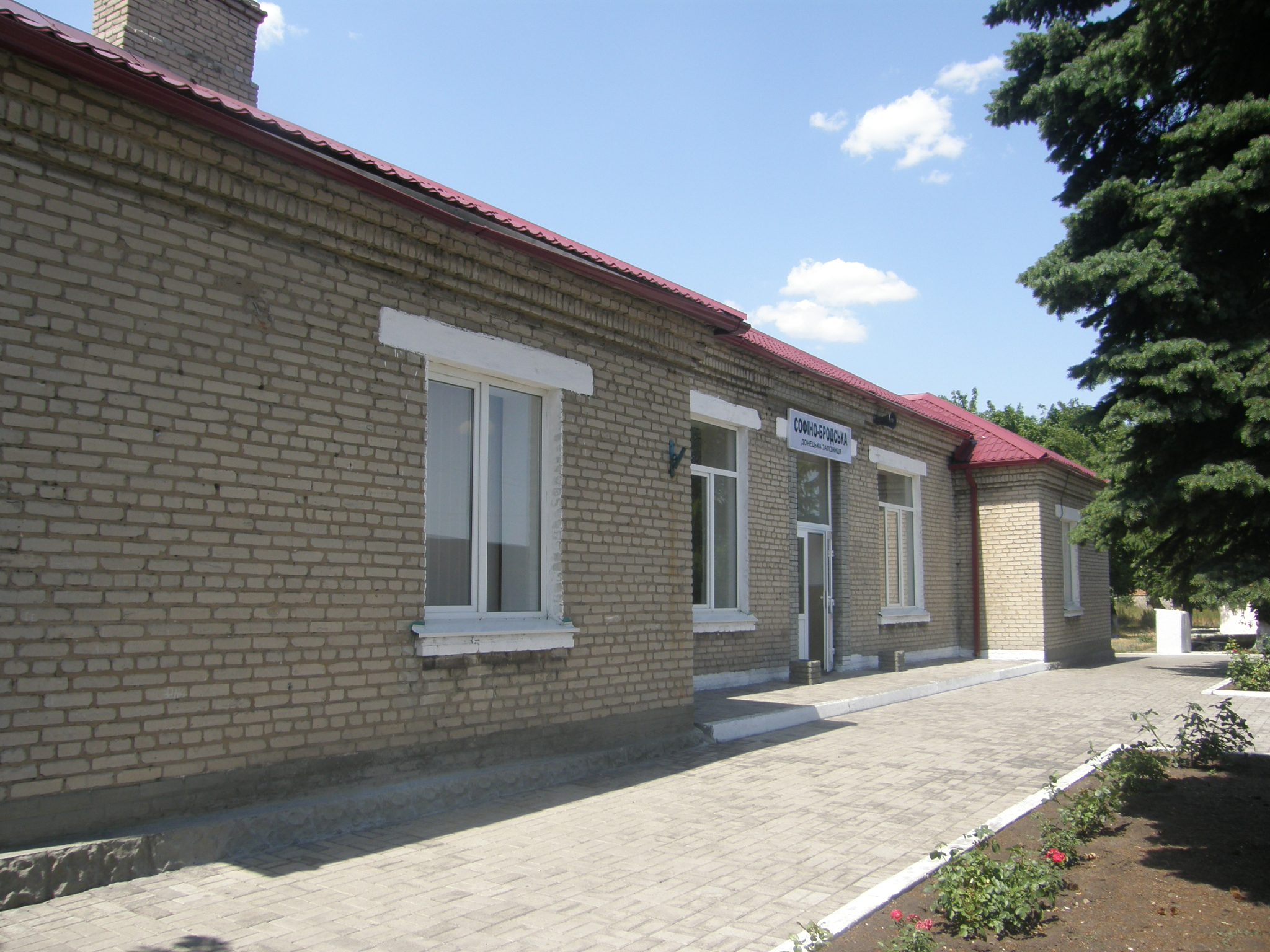
Sofino-Bridska rail station

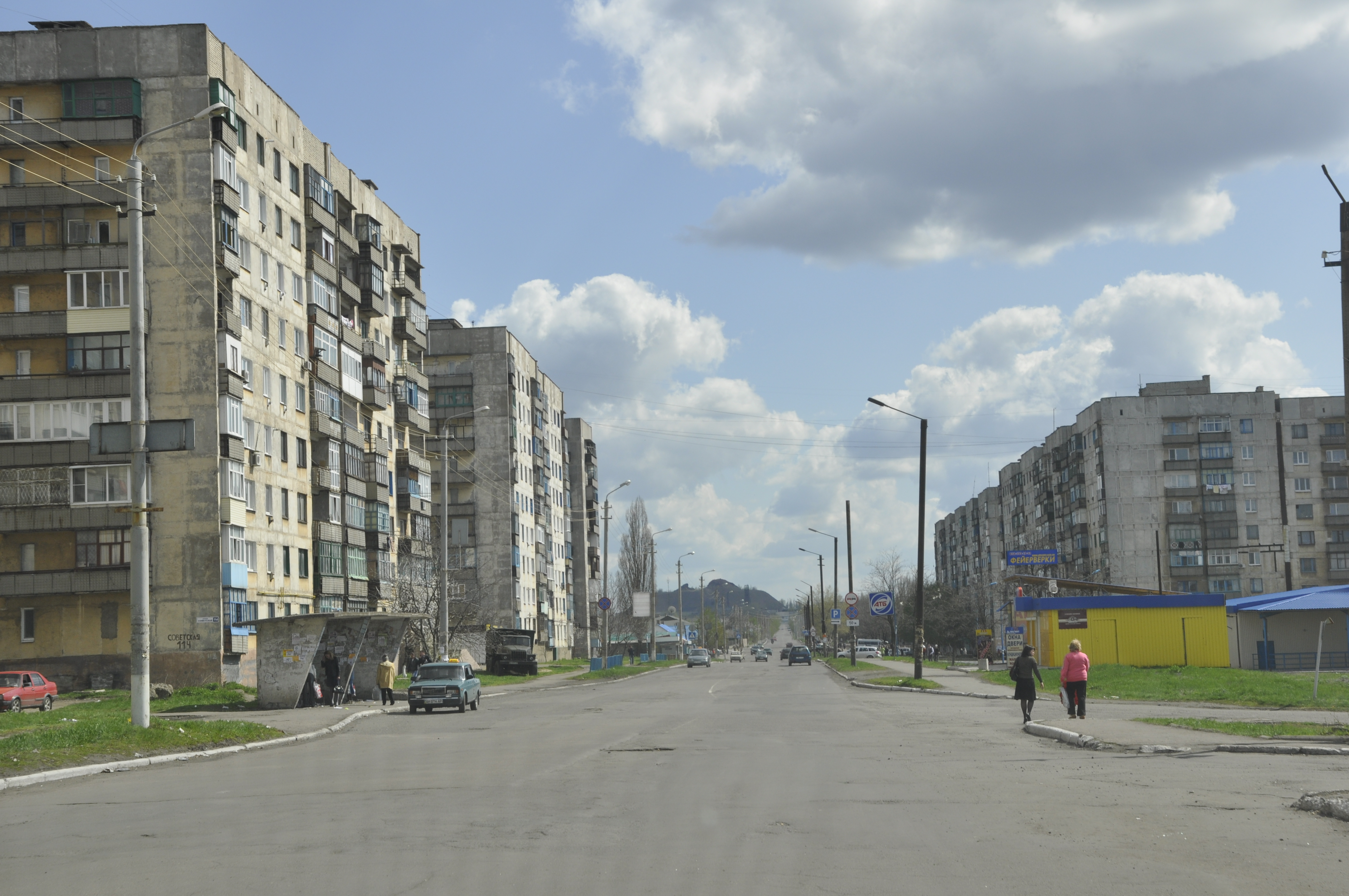
Snizhne apartment blocks
