= Luka Bondarets =

Russian commander (1892–1920)

- Лука Бондарець
- Born: 1892; Novospasivka, Mariupol, Katerynoslav, Russian Empire
- Died: 25 June 1920 (aged 27–28); Bile, Donetsk, Ukrainian SSR
- Military career
- Allegiance: Russian Empire (1914-1918); Makhnovshchyna (1918-1920)
- Service: Imperial Russian Army (1914-1918); Revolutionary Insurgent Army of Ukraine (1918-1920)
- Service years: 1914–1920
- Rank: Otaman
- Nickname: Luka Bondar
- Commands: 8th Regiment (1919); 1st Cavalry Group (1920)
- Conflicts: World War I; Ukrainian War of Independence; Bolshevik-Makhnovist conflict

Luka Nykyforovych Bondarets (Ukrainian: Лука Никифорович Бондарець; 1892–1920) was the cavalry commander of the Revolutionary Insurgent Army of Ukraine (RIAU).

== Biography ==
Luka Bondarets was born into a peasant family in the southern Ukrainian village of Novospasivka, where he worked as a carpenter. In 1910, he joined a local anarchist group. In 1914, he was drafted to fight on the eastern front of World War I, where he served as a private in the Imperial Russian Army.

After returning home from the front, he participated in the formation of an insurgent movement in Katerynoslavshchyna. In November-December 1918, he was assistant commander of a 700-strong insurgent detachment which fought against Ukrainian State and the White movement in Novospasivka. In January 1919, he joined the ranks of the Makhnovshchyna.

In March 1919, the insurgent forces were reorganised into the 3rd Trans-Dnipro Brigade and Bondarets became commander of the 8th Trans-Dnipro Regiment. Following the Battle of Peregonovka, he took command of an infantry regiment of the Revolutionary Insurgent Army of Ukraine (RIAU) and fought against Anton Denikin's Armed Forces of South Russia.

After the outbreak of the Bolshevik–Makhnovist conflict in January 1920, he went into hiding in his native village of Novospasivka. On 8 May 1920, the Novospasivka anarchist group rejoined the RIAU.

On 29 May 1920, Bondarets was elected head of the army's cavalry and a member of the Revolutionary Insurgent Council. As cavalry commander, he took part in raids into the rear of the Red Army. On 25 June 1920, his units defeated the entire 174th Red Brigade in battle, but Bondarets himself was killed in the battle.
