= Oleksandr Kapush =

Ukrainian military personnel

Oleksandr Vasyliovych Kapush (born July 27, 1991, Uzhhorod, Zakarpattia Oblast, Ukrainian SSR, USSR — February 6, 2015, Chornukhyne, Popasniansky District, Luhansk Oblast, Ukraine) was a Ukrainian military officer, a senior soldier of the Armed Forces of Ukraine, a member of the Russian-Ukrainian war; Hero of Ukraine (2017, posthumous).

== Biography ==
Oleksandr was born in 1991 in the city of Uzhhorod in Zakarpattia. In 2006, he graduated from Uzhhorod secondary school No. 6 named after V. Grange-Donsky. Love for military affairs was instilled in the boy from his childhood by his grandfather - Ivan Ivanovich, at one time he worked in the 6th school as a military leader.

Senior mechanic-driver — commander of the mountain-infantry division of the mountain-infantry platoon of the mountain-infantry company of the 15th separate mountain-infantry battalion of the 128th separate mountain-infantry brigade, military unit A1778, Uzhgorod.

Since May 2014, he participated in the anti-terrorist operation in the east of Ukraine, in particular in the battles for the Luhansk airport.

Died on February 6, 2015, during a battle in the Chornukhyne area, having been wounded by a grenade fragment in the temple. A group of scouts, led by Alexander, defended the positions against the overwhelming forces of Russian terrorists. At the most difficult moment of the battle, the enemy threw a grenade at the group. Alexander covered his comrade with himself, and he died on the spot[3]. At the same time, soldiers of the 57th Motorized Infantry Brigade, Senior Lieutenant Mykola Karnaukhov, Senior Soldier Vitaly Iskandarov, and Soldiers Oleksandr Moklyak and Yevhen Shvernenko were killed near Chornukhyne during a tank attack by Russian militants.

On February 18, they said goodbye to the 23-year-old defender soldier in Uzhhorod. He was buried at the "Calvary" cemetery on the Hill of Glory.

On October 13, 2017, on the eve of Defender of Ukraine Day, the President of Ukraine, Petro Poroshenko, presented Oleksandr's parents with the Golden Star of the Hero of Ukraine.
