= Bies (disambiguation) =

Bies may refer to:

- Bies (surname)
- PZL TS-8 "Bies" (Polish: Devil), Polish trainer airplane
- Bies, an evil spirit in Slavic mythology
- Bes coat of arms or Bies coat of arms, a Polish coat of arms
- Bulletin of Indonesian Economic Studies (BIES)

== See also ==
- Biese, Saxony-Anholt, Germany; a river
- By (disambiguation), for the singular of bies
- Bi (disambiguation), for the singular of bies
- Bie (disambiguation), for the singular of bies
