= Oleksiy Lobov =

Ukrainian footballer (born 1997)

Personal information
- Full name: Oleksiy Ihorovych Lobov
- Date of birth: 16 August 1997 (age 29)
- Place of birth: Seleznivka, Ukraine
- Height: 1.87 m (6 ft 2 in)
- Position: Centre-back

Team information
- Current team: Dordoi Bishkek
- Number: 55

Youth career
- 2010–2014: Stal Alchevsk

Senior career*
Years	Team	Apps	(Gls)
2017–2020	Avanhard Kramatorsk	94	(12)
2020–2021	Kolos Kovalivka	0	(0)
2020	→ Avanhard Kramatorsk (loan)	11	(2)
2021–2022	Obolon Kyiv	31	(3)
2022	Hebar Pazardzhik	10	(0)
2023–	Dordoi Bishkek	0	(0)
- * Club domestic league appearances and goals as of 10 March 2023

Oleksiy Ihorovych Lobov (Ukrainian: Олексій Ігорович Лобов; born 16 August 1997) is a Ukrainian professional footballer who plays as a centre-back for Dordoi Bishkek.

== Career ==
On 16 January 2023, Dordoi Bishkek announced the signing of Lobov to a one-year contract.
