= Bies (surname) =

Bies is a surname. Notable people with the surname include:

- Don Bies (born 1937), American golfer
- Garey Bies (born 1946), American politician
- Jean Biès (1933–2014), French philosopher and poet
- Rauno Bies (born 1961), Finnish sport shooter
- Susan Bies (born 1947), American banker

== See also ==
- Bies (disambiguation)
- Bes coat of arms or Bies coat of arms, a Polish coat of arms
