= Olena Mokrenchuk =

Ukrainian major and journalist

- Олена Мокренчук
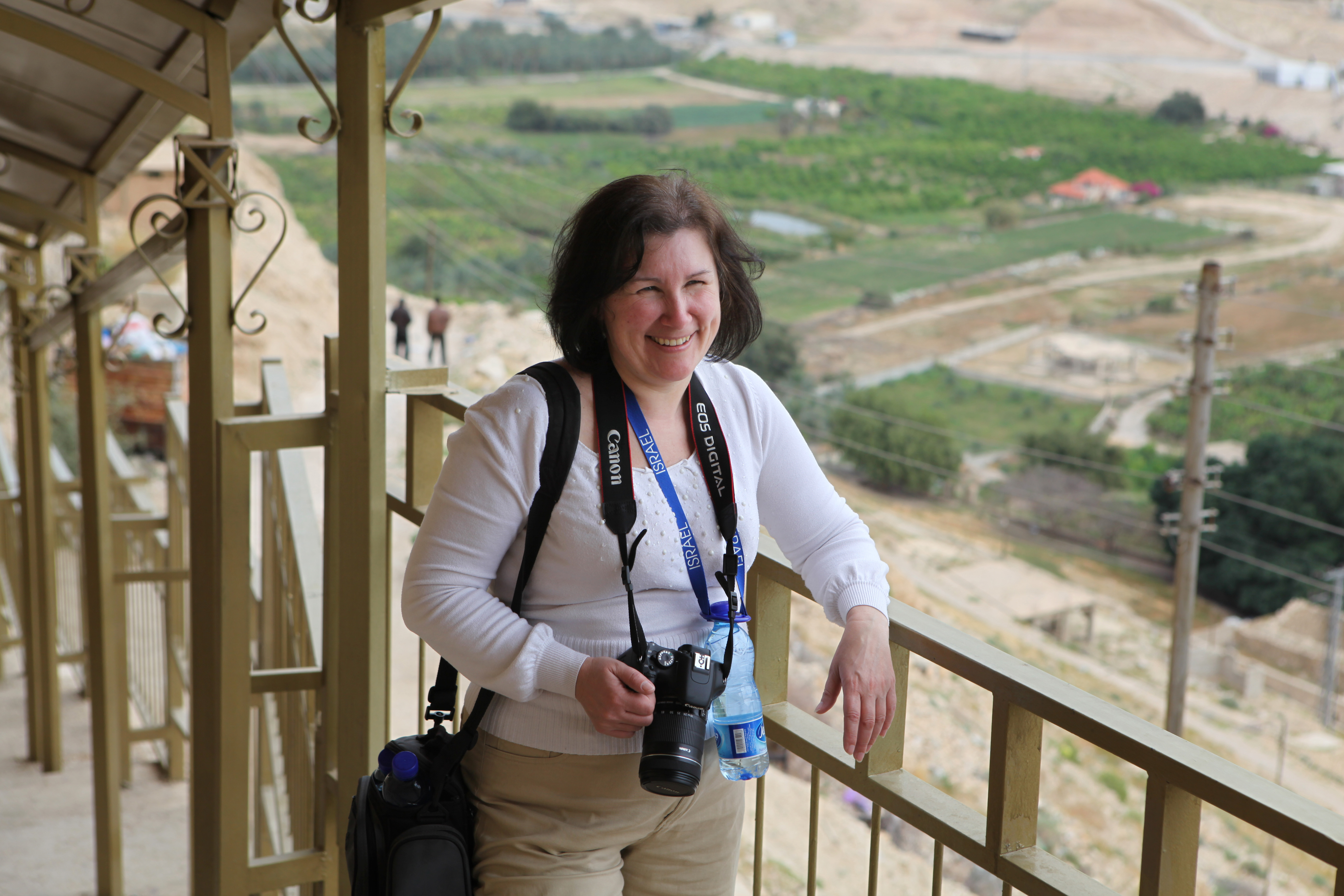

Personal details
- Born: Olena Viktorivna Mokrenchuk; August 19, 1967 (age 59) Snizhne, Donetsk Oblast
- Education: Donetsk National University
- Nickname: Swallow

Military service
- Allegiance: Ukraine
- Years of service: 2015–present
- Rank: Major
- Commands: 1) officer of the Public Affairs Department of the Armed Forces of Ukraine; 2) temporarily acting head of press center Operational Command "North"; 3) press officer 72nd Mechanized Brigade named after the Black Zaporizhzhians
- Battles/wars: Russo-Ukrainian War

Olena Viktorivna Mokrenchuk (Ukrainian: Олена Вікторівна Мокренчук; pseudo — Swallow; born August 19, 1967, in Snizhne, Donetsk Oblast) is a Ukrainian journalist, writer, historian, teacher, participant of the Revolution of Dignity. With the beginning of the Russian-Ukrainian war, she was a volunteer, a military representative, a Major of the Armed Forces of Ukraine. Member of the National Union of Journalists of Ukraine and National Writers Union of Ukraine.

== Biography ==
Olena Mokrenchuk was born on August 19, 1967, in the city of Snizhne in Donetsk Oblast. She graduated from the Faculty of History of the Vasyl Stus Donetsk National University. She worked as a history teacher and journalist in Donbas (until 2009), a correspondent for a Kyiv magazine (2004–2013), dean of the experimental Faculty of Christian journalism at the Kyiv Christian University (2006–2011), director of the AlfaPress information agency (2009–2015).

She participated in the Revolution of Dignity (from November 21, 2013, to March 2014). She was a volunteer, head of the volunteer organization "Soldiers Post", head of the charitable organization "Help Front" (2014-2016).

She was mobilized into the Armed Forces of Ukraine on August 3, 2015, served as a press officer of the 72nd Mechanized Brigade named after the Black Zaporozhians (2015–2018), she was an acting head of the press service of the Operational Command "North" (2018-2021). From December 2021, she is the officer of the Public Affairs Department of the Armed Forces of Ukraine.

== Achievements ==
The author of numerous publications in the mass media, as well as the books "Ukraine-the Dream", "Aliska - Frontline Fox", "Afinka from «Cuba»" and "Wind from the Wild Field"; co-author of the "National Book of Memory of the Victims of the Holodomor of 1932-1933 in Ukraine" (2008), and a series of biographical Almanacs about outstanding personalities of Ukraine, such as "Priazovya: Portrait contemporary" and others. Editor-compiler of three poetry collections by Christian authors and a collection of competitive works by children of Luhansk Oblast "Letters to the Front".

== Awards ==
- President's Award for Anti-Terrorist Operation Service (2015);
- Medal of the Minister of Defense of Ukraine "For Exemplary Service" (2020);
- Medal of the Chief of the General Staff "For Achievements in Military Service" II degree (2020);
- Badge of the Commander of the Land Forces of the Armed Forces of Ukraine "Land Forces of Ukraine" (2018);
- Medal of the Commander of the Land Forces of the Armed Forces of Ukraine "For Service" (2019);
- Medal of the Commander of the Land Forces of the Armed Forces of Ukraine "For Particular Service" (2021);
- Badge of the Commander of the Joint Forces of the Armed Forces of Ukraine "Cossack Cross" III degree (2020);
- Badge of the Commander of the Joint Forces of the Armed Forces of Ukraine "For Service and Achievement" III degree (2023);
- Medal of the Commander of the Operational Command "North" of the Land Forces of the Armed Forces of Ukraine "For Conscientious Service" (2020);
- Badge "Golden Star of Journalism" (2016);
- Badge "Person of the Year" in the nomination "Journalism" (2008);
- Medal "For the defense of Volnovakha" (2015);
- Medal "Combat Volunteer of Ukraine" (2016);
- Honorary award "Bohdan Khmelnytskyi", 3rd class (2017);
- Medal "For Sacrifice and Love for Ukraine" (2017);
- Medal "For the Indomitable Spirit" (2021);
- and others

== Military ranks ==
- Major (2023);
- Captain (2022);
- Senior lieutenant.

== Sources ==
- Л. Пуляєва. "На Донбасі мене рятували майданівська безстрашність і паспорт з донецькою пропискою", Високий замок, 02.04.2021.
- Я. Тимощук. «Після повноліття донька сказала: “Мамо, йдемо у військкомат”» — волонтерка, Радіо Свобода, 17.08.2016.
- В. Скоростецький. «Книгу „Вітер зі Сходу“ допишу, коли завершиться війна» — пресофіцерка ОК «Північ» Олена Мокренчук, АрміяInform, 27.04.2020.
- О. Гордєєв. Старший офіцер прес-центру оперативного командування «Північ» Олена Мокренчук: «Від початку війни мріяла писати про героїзм українських військових», Цензор.нет, 18.02.2019.
- Героїчна історія донбасівки Олени Мокренчук — прес-офіцера 72-ї бригади, дочка якої стала навідницею САУ, Новинарня, 09.03.2017.
- Р. Рудомський. Прес-офіцер Мокренчук: Про інформацію і правду з АТО, доньку солдата і місію прес-офіцера, Depo.ua, 17.07.2017.
- М. Пучинець. Олена Мокренчук: «Вітер зі сходу» надрукую, як скінчиться війна, Інформаційний портал Чернігівщини.
- Книга Афінка з Куби Олена Мокренчук, Блокпост.
