= Pervomaiskyi, Donetsk Oblast =

Urban locality in Donetsk Oblast, Ukraine

Pervomaiskyi Первомайський
- Rural settlement
- Interactive map of Pervomaiskyi
- Location of Pervomaiskyi Pervomaiskyi (Ukraine)
- Coordinates: 47°58′25″N 38°47′15″E
- Country: Ukraine
- Oblast: Donetsk Oblast
- Raion: Horlivka Raion
- Hromada: Snizhne urban hromada
- Elevation: 262 m (860 ft)

Population (2022)
  - Total: 2,787
- Time zone: UTC+2
  - Summer (DST): UTC+3
- Postal code: 86595
- Area code: +380 6256

Pervomaiskyi (Ukrainian: Первомайський) is a rural settlement in Snizhne urban hromada, Horlivka Raion, Donetsk Oblast, eastern Ukraine. Population: 2,787 (2022 estimate).

== Demographics ==
Native language as of the Ukrainian Census of 2001:

- Ukrainian 4.2%
- Russian 95.47%
