= Snizhne urban hromada =

Snizhne urban hromada Сніжнянська міська громада
- Hromada
- Interactive map of Snizhne urban hromada
- Country: Ukraine
- Oblast: Donetsk
- Raion: Horlivka
- Admin. center: Snizhne
- Settlements: 30
- Cities: 1
- Rural settlements: 4
- Villages: 15
- Towns: 10

Snizhne urban hromada (Ukrainian: Сніжнянська міська громада) is a hromada of Ukraine, located in Horlivka Raion, Donetsk Oblast. Its administrative center is the city Snizhne.

The hromada contains 30 settlements: 1 city (Snizhne), 10 urban-type settlements (Andriivka, Brazhyne, Hirnitske, Zalisne, Lymanchuk, Nykyforove, Pervomaiske, Pervomaiskyi, Sieverne, and Pobieda), 15 villages:

- Verkhnyi Kut
- Dibrivka
- Dmitrivka
- Zrubne
- Latysheve
- Manuylivka
- Marynivka
- Perederieve
- Petrivske
- Rozsypne
- Saurivka
- Stepanivka
- Tarany
- Chervona Zorya
- Chuhuno-Krepinka

And 4 rural-type settlements: Balka, Molchalyne, Sukhivske, and Kozhevnya.

== See also ==
- List of hromadas of Ukraine
