= Yuriivka, Luhansk Oblast =

Urban locality in Luhansk Oblast, Ukraine

Yuriivka Юріївка
- Rural settlement
- Location of Yuriivka within Luhansk Oblast Location of Yuriivka within Ukraine
- Coordinates: 48°29′23″N 38°57′50″E
- Country: Ukraine
- Oblast: Luhansk Oblast
- Raion: Alchevsk Raion
- Hromada: Alchevsk urban hromada
- Elevation: 96 m (315 ft)

Population (2022)
  - Total: 2,882
- Time zone: UTC+2 (EET)
  - Summer (DST): UTC+3 (EEST)
- Postal code: 92012
- Area code: +380 6436

Yuriivka (Ukrainian: Юріївка; Russian: Юрьевка, romanized: Yuryevka), formerly Yurivka (Ukrainian: Юр'ївка), is a rural settlement in Alchevsk urban hromada, Alchevsk Raion (district), Luhansk Oblast (region), Ukraine. Population: 2,882 (2022 estimate)

On 18 June 2025, the Verkhovna Rada renamed the village to Yuriivka to match Ukrainian language standards.

== Demographics ==
Native language distribution as of the Ukrainian Census of 2001:

- Ukrainian: 38.99%
- Russian: 60.76%
- Others: 0.14%
