= Pervomaiske, Horlivka Raion, Donetsk Oblast =

Urban locality in Donetsk Oblast, Ukraine

Pervomaiske Первомайське
- Rural settlement
- Interactive map of Pervomaiske
- Location of Pervomaiske Pervomaiske (Ukraine)
- Coordinates: 47°59′47″N 38°47′14″E
- Country: Ukraine
- Oblast: Donetsk Oblast
- Raion: Horlivka Raion
- Elevation: 234 m (768 ft)

Population (2022)
  - Total: 500
- Time zone: UTC+2
  - Summer (DST): UTC+3
- Postal code: 86596
- Area code: +380 6256

Pervomaiske (Ukrainian: Первомайське) is a rural settlement in Snizhne urban hromada, Horlivka Raion, Donetsk Oblast, eastern Ukraine. Population: 500 (2022 estimate).

== Demographics ==
Native language as of the Ukrainian Census of 2001:

- Ukrainian 93.22%
- Russian 6.47%
- Hungarian 0.16%
