= Alchevsk urban hromada =

Alchevsk urban hromada Алчевська міська громада
- Hromada
- Interactive map of Alchevsk urban hromada
- Country: Ukraine
- Oblast: Luhansk
- Raion: Alchevsk
- Settlements: 35
- Cities: 4
- Villages: 19
- Towns: 12

Alchevsk urban hromada (Ukrainian: Алчевська міська громада) is a hromada of Ukraine, located in Alchevsk Raion, Luhansk Oblast. Its administrative center is the city Alchevsk.

The hromada contains 35 settlements: 4 cities (Alchevsk, Zorynsk, Kypuche, and Perevalsk), 12 rural settlements:

- Bairachky
- Bile
- Buhaivka
- Horodyshche
- Komisarivka
- Mykhailivka
- Seleznivka
- Fashchivka
- Tsentralnyi
- Chornushyne
- Yuriivka
- Yashchykove

And 19 villages:

- Adrianopil
- Borzhykivka
- Verhulivka
- Horodnie
- Depreradivka
- Kamianka
- Karpaty
- Kruhlyk
- Maloivanivka
- Malokostiantynivka
- Mius
- Novoselivka
- Petrivka
- Seleznivske
- Sofiivka
- Timiriazeve
- Troitske
- Utchyne
- Chornohorivka

== See also ==
- List of hromadas of Ukraine
