= Perevalsk =

City in Luhansk Oblast, Ukraine

Perevalsk Перевальськ
- City
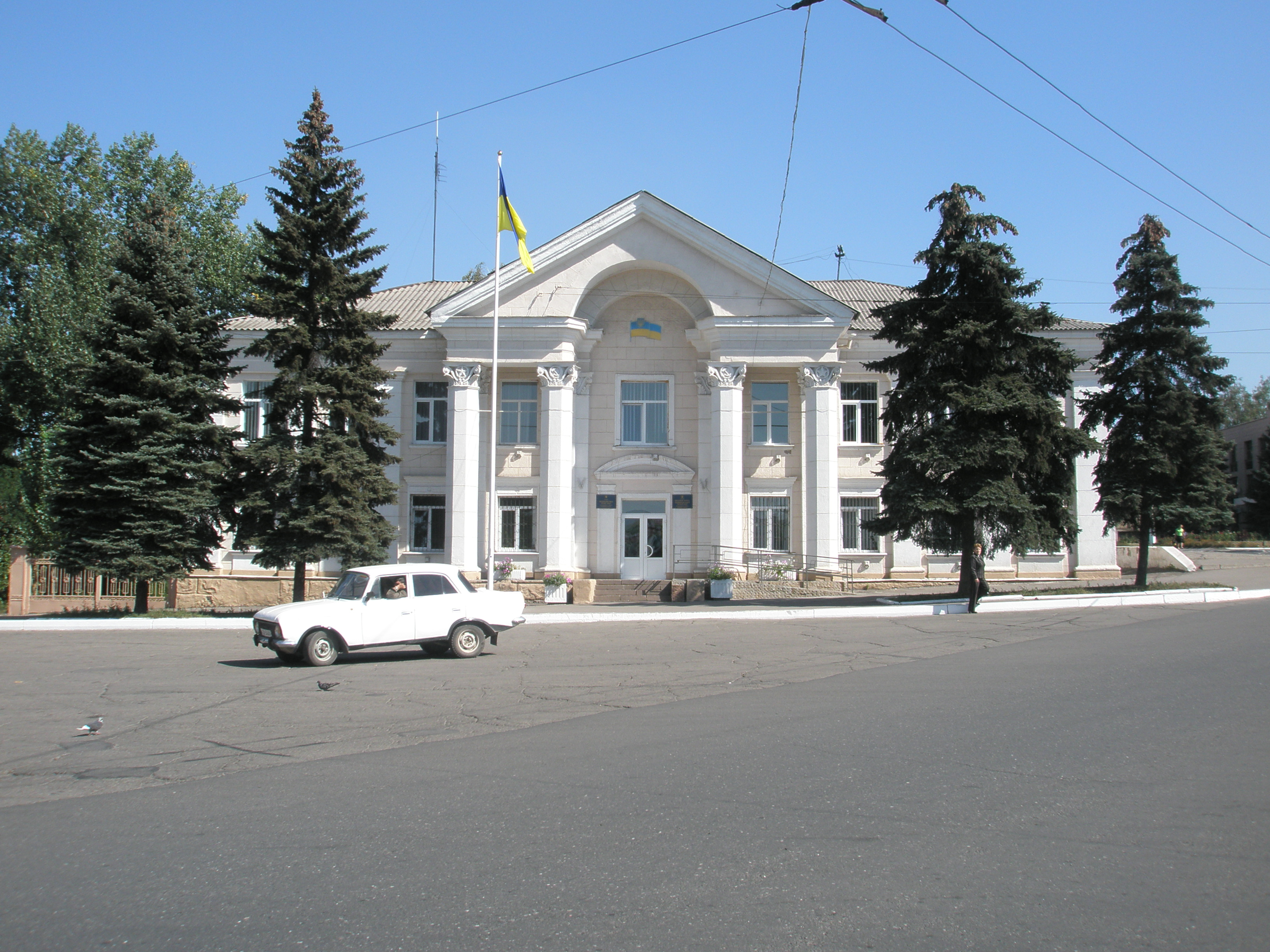
- Perevalsk City Hall

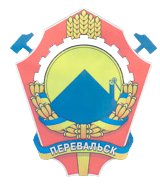
- Coat of arms
- Interactive map of Perevalsk
- Location within Ukraine Location within Luhansk Oblast
- Coordinates: 48°26′N 38°49′E
- Country: Ukraine
- Oblast: Luhansk Oblast
- Raion: Alchevsk Raion
- Hromada: Alchevsk urban hromada
- Founded: 1902
- City status: 1964
- Area: 30 km^{2} (12 sq mi)
- Elevation: 259 m (850 ft)
- Population (2022): 24,817
- Climate: Dfb

Perevalsk (Ukrainian: Перевальськ, [pereˈʋalʲsʲk]; Russian: Перевальск) is a city in Alchevsk urban hromada, Alchevsk Raion, Luhansk Oblast (region), Ukraine. Population: 24,817 (2022 estimate), 25,941 (2013 est.).

Perevalsk borders immediately on the larger town of Alchevsk which in 1961–1991 also was named after the Paris Commune as Kommunarsk.

Perevalsk has been occupied by Russia and its proxy the Luhansk People's Republic since 2014.

== History ==
Perevalsk was founded in 1889 as Seleznyovsky Quarry, for the workers in coal mining and it belonged to Podolian nobleman and Imperial Russian loyal subject Kazimierz Mscichowski. Over time it grew by incorporating similar miner's settlements. In 1924 it was renamed as imeni Parizhskoi Kommuny (after the Paris Commune) out of brevity was referred to as Parkommuna. In 1938 it adopted its shortened name, Parkommuna, as official, and in 1964 it acquired its present name. In 1964, it became the administrative center of the newly established Perevalsk Raion.

Since 2014, Perevalsk has been administered as a part of the self-proclaimed Luhansk People's Republic (LPR). Perevalsk Raion was abolished by the Ukrainian government in 2020. Following the 2022 annexation referendums in Russian-occupied Ukraine, Russia has declared the territory as their own, as part of their LPR.

== Demographics ==
As of the 2001 Ukrainian census, the town had a population of 29,220. Ethnic Ukrainians and Russians account for more than 95% of the city's population, while Belarusians, Moldovans and Tatars form small minorities.

Ethnic groups in Perevalsk
Ethnic groups	percent
Ukrainians	55.79%
Russians	41.42%
Belarusians	1.18%
Tatars	0.35%
Moldovans	0.19%
Armenians	0.19%
Azerbaijanis	0.16%
Poles	0.11%
Georgians	0.11%

== Notable people ==
- Anatoliy Yarosh (born 1952), Ukrainian athlete
