= Zorynsk =

City in Luhansk Oblast, Ukraine

Zorynsk Зоринськ
- City
- Interactive map of Zorynsk
- Location within Ukraine Location within Luhansk Oblast
- Country: Ukraine
- Oblast: Luhansk Oblast
- Raion: Alchevsk Raion
- Hromada: Alchevsk urban hromada
- City status on: 1963

Area
  - Total: 8.68 km^{2} (3.35 sq mi)

Population (2022)
  - Total: ▼7,096

Zorynsk (Ukrainian: Зоринськ, Russian: Зоринск), is a city in Alchevsk urban hromada, Alchevsk Raion, Luhansk Oblast (region), Ukraine. Population: 7,096 (2022 estimate). 7,331 (2013 est.)

Zorynsk has been a city since 1963. From 2014 on, and the War in Donbas (2014–2022), Zorynsk has been controlled by the Luhansk People's Republic. Following the 2022 annexation referendums in Russian-occupied Ukraine, Russia has claimed the territory as part of their LNR / LPR.

On 12 June 2020, in accordance with the Order of the Cabinet of Ministers of Ukraine No. 717-r "On the determination of administrative centers and approval of territories of territorial communities of the Luhansk Oblast", it became part of the Alchevsk urban hromada.

On 19 July 2020, as a result of the administrative-territorial reform and liquidation of Perevalsk Raion, it became part of Alchevsk Raion.

== Demographics ==
As of the 2001 census, Zorynsk had a population of 8,672 inhabitants. Like in the rest of the Donbas region, ethnic Ukrainians constitute the clear majority of the population, yet Russian is the lingua franca. The exact ethnic and linguistic composition was as follows:

Ethnic groups in Zorynsk
	percent
Ukrainians	66.96%
Russians	30.42%
Belarusians	1.22%
Tatars	0.35%
Azerbaijanis	0.18%
Armenians	0.12%

Primary languages in Zorynsk
	percent
Russian	82.7%
Ukrainian	17.0%
Belarusian	0.1%
Armenian	0.1%
others	0.1%
