= Sieverne, Horlivka Raion, Donetsk Oblast =

Urban locality in Donetsk Oblast, Ukraine

Sieverne Сєверне
- Rural settlement
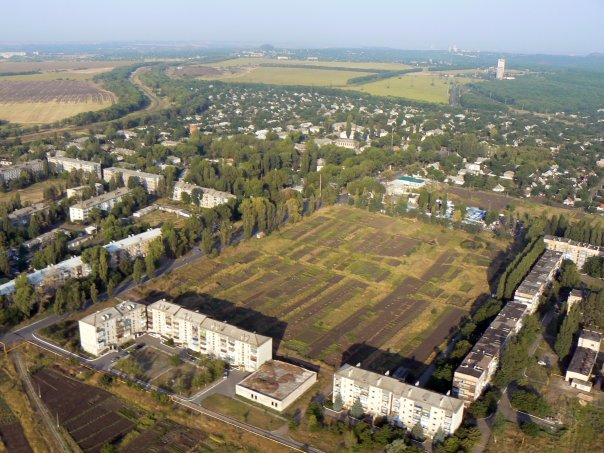

- Location of Proletarske within Donetsk Oblast#Location of Proletarske within Ukraine Sieverne (Ukraine)
- Coordinates: 48°05′09″N 38°41′39″E
- Country: Ukraine
- Oblast: Donetsk Oblast
- Raion: Horlivka Raion
- Elevation: 295 m (968 ft)

Population (2022)
  - Total: 9,832
- Time zone: UTC+2 (EET)
  - Summer (DST): UTC+3 (EEST)
- Postal code: 86583-86588
- Area code: +380 6256

Sieverne (Ukrainian: Сєверне) is a rural settlement in Snizhne urban hromada, Horlivka Raion, Donetsk Oblast, eastern Ukraine. Population: 9,832 (2022 estimate).

== Demographics ==
Native language as of the Ukrainian Census of 2001:

- Ukrainian 19.09%
- Russian 80.58%
- Belarusian 0.14%
- Bulgarian and "Moldovan" (Romanian) 0.03%
