= Chornushyne =

Urban locality in Luhansk Oblast, Ukraine

Chornushyne Чорнушине
- Rural settlement
- Location of Chornukhyne in Luhansk Oblast Chornushyne (Luhansk Oblast)
- Coordinates: 48°19′35″N 38°30′56″E
- Country: Ukraine
- Oblast: Luhansk Oblast
- Raion: Alchevsk Raion
- Hromada: Alchevsk urban hromada
- Founded: 1600
- Town status: 1938

Government
  - Town Head: Valeriy Latsyk

Area
  - Total: 6.96 km^{2} (2.69 sq mi)
- Elevation: 326 m (1,070 ft)

Population (2022)
  - Total: 5,690 ▼
  - Density: 818/km^{2} (2,120/sq mi)
- Time zone: UTC+2 (EET)
  - Summer (DST): UTC+3 (EEST)
- Postal code: 94340
- Area code: +380 6441
- Website: http://rada.gov.ua/

Chornushyne (Ukrainian: Чорнушине), formerly Chornukhyne (Чорнухине), is a rural settlement in Alchevsk urban hromada, Alchevsk Raion (district), Luhansk Oblast (region), Ukraine. It was formerly in the Popasna Raion and then Perevalsk Raion. In the 2001 Ukrainian census, the town's population was 7,782. The current population estimate is 5,690 (2022 estimate).

The Kalmius and Chornukha Rivers flow through the town. It is located 80 kilometres (50 mi) northeast of Donetsk.

Chornukhyne came under the control of the Luhansk People's Republic (LNR / LPR) following fierce fighting, in early 2015. It was taken shortly before nearby Debaltseve in the Battle of Debaltseve. Following the 2022 annexation referendums in Russian-occupied Ukraine, Russia has claimed the territory as part of their LNR / LPR.

== History ==
The territory was first settled in 1600 as the Chornukhynskyi Post (Ukrainian: Чорнухинський пост) of the Kalmius Palanka of the Zaporizhian Sich cossack territory. In 1778, the settlement was a sloboda, and in 1892 it became a village. It was granted the status of an urban-type settlement in 1938.

On 7 October 2014, to facilitate the governance of Luhansk Oblast during the war in Donbas, the Verkhovna Rada made some changes in the administrative divisions, so that the localities in the government-controlled areas were grouped into districts. In particular, Chornukhyne was transferred from Perevalsk Raion to Popasna Raion. However, on 20 February 2015, Ukraine lost control of the settlement, and as of 2023 has not regained control.

On 18 June 2025, the Verkhovna Rada renamed the rural settlement to Chornushyne to match Ukrainian language standards.

== Notable people ==
Nikolai Ilyin, top Soviet sniper during World War II

== See also ==
- Repellent-1
