= Moni Bilé =

Cameroonian makossa musician

- Born: August 1957 (age 67)
- Origin: Cameroon
- Genres: Makossa
- Occupation: Musician

Moni Bilé (born August 1957) is a Cameroonian makossa musician. He was the best-selling makossa performer of the 1980s, and his album Amour & Espérance was an international hit that extended the worldwide popularity of the genre.

== Sources ==
- Hudgens, Jim, and Richard Trillo (1999). West Africa: The Rough Guide. Third ed. London: Rough Guides Ltd. ISBN 978-1858284682
- West, Ben (2004). Cameroon: The Bradt Travel Guide. Guilford, Connecticut: The Globe Pequot Press Inc. ISBN 978-1841620787
