= Bile, Luhansk Oblast =

Urban locality in Luhansk Oblast, Ukraine

Bile Біле
- Rural settlement
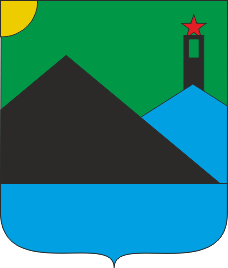
- Coat of arms
- Interactive map of Bile
- Location of Bile within Luhansk Oblast#Location of Bile within Ukraine Bile (Ukraine)
- Coordinates: 48°29′37″N 39°02′12″E
- Country: Ukraine
- Oblast: Luhansk Oblast
- Raion: Alchevsk Raion
- Hromada: Alchevsk urban hromada
- Founded: 1705
- Elevation: 68 m (223 ft)

Population (2022)
  - Total: 6,248
- Time zone: UTC+2 (EET)
  - Summer (DST): UTC+3 (EEST)
- Postal code: 92015
- Area code: +380 6436

Bile (Ukrainian: Біле) is a rural settlement in Alchevsk urban hromada, Alchevsk Raion (district), Luhansk Oblast (region), Ukraine. Population: 6,248 (2022 estimate)

== Demographics ==
Native language distribution as of the Ukrainian Census of 2001:

- Ukrainian: 44.55%
- Russian: 55.05%
- Others: 0.23%
