= Bes coat of arms =

Polish coat of arms

Bes
- Alternative name(s): Bies, Bees, Beess
- Families: Bes, Beess, Besowski, Katowski

Bes (Bies, Bees, Beess) is a Polish coat of arms.

== Bibliography ==
- Tadeusz Gajl: Herbarz polski od średniowiecza do XX wieku : ponad 4500 herbów szlacheckich 37 tysięcy nazwisk 55 tysięcy rodów. L&L, 2007. ISBN 978-83-60597-10-1.
- Samuel Orgelbrand: Encyklopedia Powszechna. Warszawa: 1898.
- Juliusz Karol Ostrowski: Księga herbowa rodów polskich. Warszawa: Główny skład Księgarnia Antykwarska B. Bolcewicza, 1897. T.1, str 33, T.2, str. 20

== See also ==
- Polish heraldry
- Heraldic family
- List of Polish nobility coats of arms
