= Tatars in Ukraine =

татари України (Ukrainian); Украина татарлары (Tatar)

Total population
- 73,304 (2001)

Regions with significant populations
- Donetsk Oblast: 19,161 (2001)
- Crimea (including Sevastopol): 11,090 (2001)
- Luhansk Oblast: 8,543 (2001)
- Kherson Oblast: 5,353 (2001)
- Zaporizhzhia Oblast: 5,177 (2001)
- Kharkiv Oblast: 4,198 (2001)
- Dnipropetrovsk Oblast: 3,835 (2001)
- Odesa Oblast: 2,640 (2001)
- Sevastopol: 2,512 (2001)
- other regions of Ukraine: 10,795 (2001)

Languages
- Russian (58.7%); Tatar (35.2%)

Related ethnic groups
- Crimean Tatars

Tatars are one of many ethnic minorities in Ukraine. In Ukraine, the Tatar national identification is used primarily for such Turkic group as Volga Tatars, less often Siberian Tatars. They are known as Tatars of Ukraine (Ukrainian: татари України, romanized: Tatary Ukrayiny; Tatar: Украина татарлары, romanized: Ukraina tatarları).

== Population ==
According to the 2001 Ukrainian Census, the number of Tatars in Ukraine was estimated at over 73,000.

== History ==
Tatars have lived in Ukraine since the princely times. One of its representatives, Khan Tugorkhan, lived at the Trukhaniv Island until his assassination in 1096.

One of the largest Tatar diasporas of Ukraine lived in Donetsk. It is believed that they reside in that region since the 13th century.
