= Perevalsk Raion =

Former subdivision of Luhansk Oblast, Ukraine

Perevalsk Raion Перевальський район
- Raion
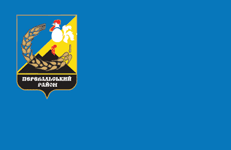
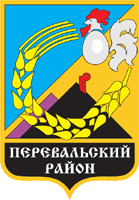
- Flag Coat of arms

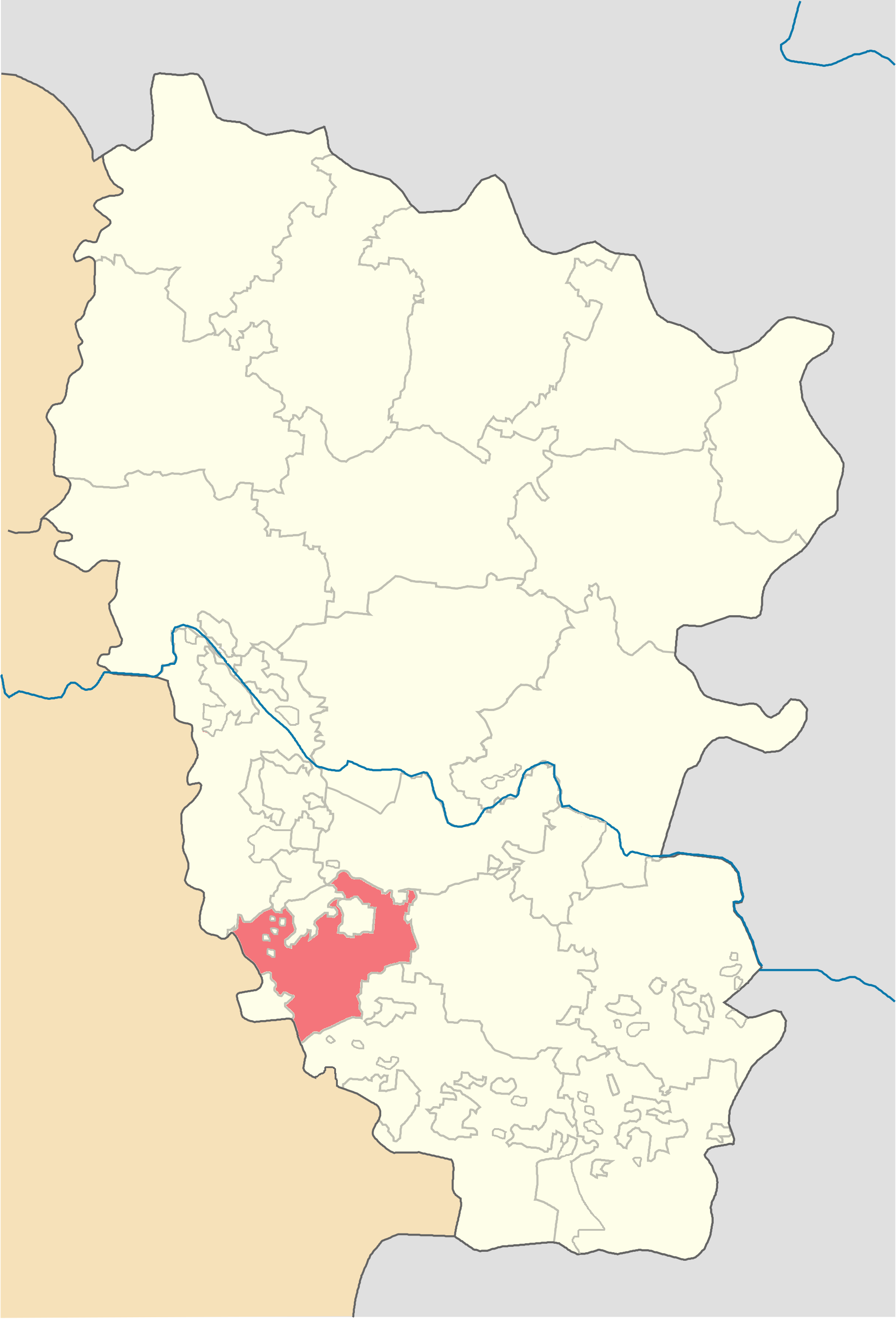
- Coordinates: 48°23′29″N 38°40′27″E
- Country: Ukraine
- Region: Luhansk Oblast
- Established: 1939
- Disestablished: 18 July 2020
- Admin. center: Perevalsk
- Subdivisions: List: 3 — city councils; 9 — settlement councils; 4 — rural councils; Number of localities: 3 — cities; 9 — urban-type settlements; 16 — villages; 10 — rural settlements

Area
  - Total: 806.8 km^{2} (311.5 sq mi)

Population (2020)
  - Total: 63,054 ▼
  - Density: 78.15/km^{2} (202.4/sq mi)
- Time zone: UTC+02:00 (EET)
  - Summer (DST): UTC+03:00 (EEST)
- Postal index: 94300—94344
- Area code: +380 6441
- Website: http://prv.loga.gov.ua

Perevalsk Municipal District Перевальский муниципальный округ (Russian)
- District

Other transcription(s)
  - Ukrainian: Перевальський район
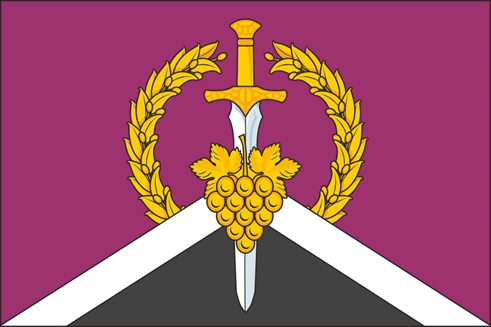
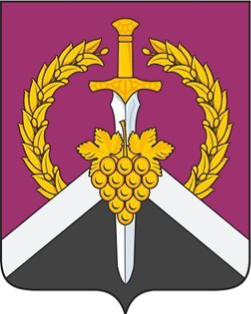
- Flag Coat of arms

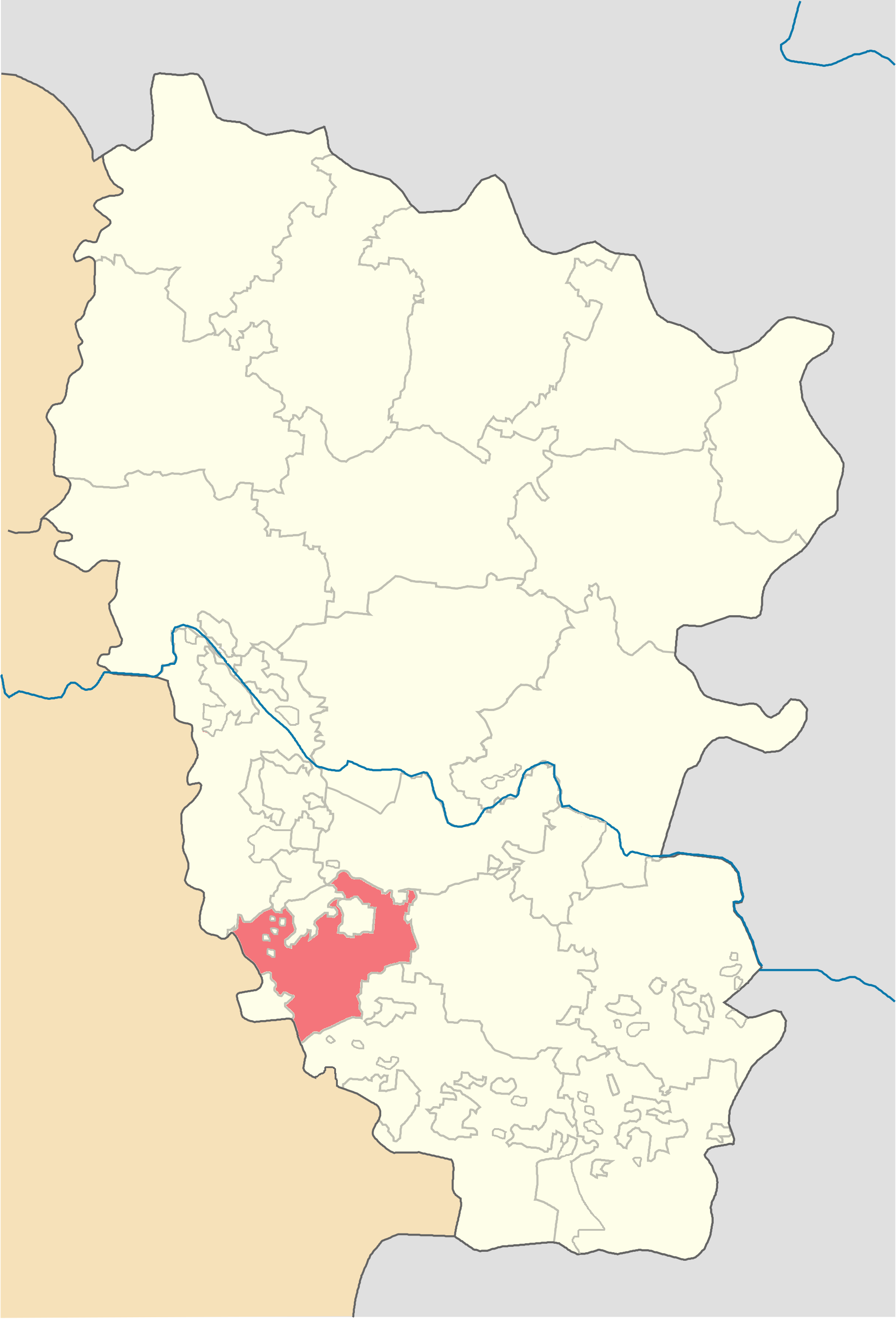
- Location of Perevalsk District in the Luhansk People's Republic
- Coordinates: 48°23′29″N 38°40′27″E
- Country: Russia
- Federal subject: Luhansk People's Republic
- Established: 1939
- Administrative center: Perevalsk

Area
  - Total: 806.8 km^{2} (311.5 sq mi)
- Website: https://aprlnr.su

Perevalsk Raion (Ukrainian: Перевальський район) was a raion (district) of Luhansk Oblast, Ukraine, between 1939 and 2020. The administrative center of the raion was the city of Perevalsk. The last estimate of the raion population, reported by the Ukrainian government, was 63,064 (2020 est.).

The raion was known by various other names during the 20th century, including Alchevsk Raion, Voroshylovsk Raion, and Komunarsk Raion.

== Geography ==
Perevalsk Raion was located in the southwestern part of Luhansk Oblast. It bordered Slovianoserbsk Raion to the north, Lysychansk Municipality to the west, Antratsyt Municipality to the southeast, Lutuhyne Raion to the east, Shakhtarsk Raion to the southwest, and Bakhmut Raion of Donetsk Oblast to the west.

== History ==
Perevalsk Raion was formed originally in 1939, originally under the name Horodyshche Raion. On 15 April 1941, Horodyshche Raion was renamed to Voroshylovsk Raion, with its administrative center moved to Voroshylovsk (now Alchevsk). On 30 December 1961, Voroshylovsk Raion was renamed to Komunarsk Raion, with its administrative center moved to Komunarsk (now Perevalsk). On 30 December 1962, the administrative divisions of rural areas of the Ukrainian SSR were "consolidated", leading to the dissolution of Komunarsk Raion and the incorporation of its former area into Lysychansk Raion.

In January 1965, much of this reform was undone, and Komunarsk Raion was reformed, with its center defined as being in Perevalsk again. On 8 December 1966, Komunarsk Raion was renamed to Perevalsk Raion. On the same day, part of Perevalsk Raion was split off and assigned to Slovianoserbsk Raion.

Since 2014, the raion has been controlled by forces of the Luhansk People's Republic (LPR). On 7 October 2014, to facilitate the governance of Luhansk Oblast, the Verkhovna Rada on 7 October 2014 made some changes in the administrative divisions, so that the localities in the government-controlled areas were grouped into districts. In particular, the urban-type settlement of Chornukhyne was transferred from Perevalsk Raion to Popasna Raion.

Perevalsk Raion was officially abolished on 18 July 2020 as part of the administrative reform of Ukraine, which reduced the number of raions of Luhansk Oblast to eight.

Since the 2022 annexation referendums in Russian-occupied Ukraine, Russia has claimed the territory as part of Russia. In the Russian federal subject known as the Luhansk People's Republic, the region still has the status of an administrative centre.

== Demographics ==
As of the 2001 Ukrainian census, the self-reported ethnic distribution of the raion was:

- Ukrainians: 56.7%
- Russians: 40.6%
- Belarusians: 1.1%

== Notable people ==
- Vasyl Holoborodko (born 1945), Ukrainian poet
