= Administrative divisions of Luhansk Oblast =

Luhansk Oblast is subdivided into districts (raions) which are subdivided into territorial communities (hromadas).

== Current ==
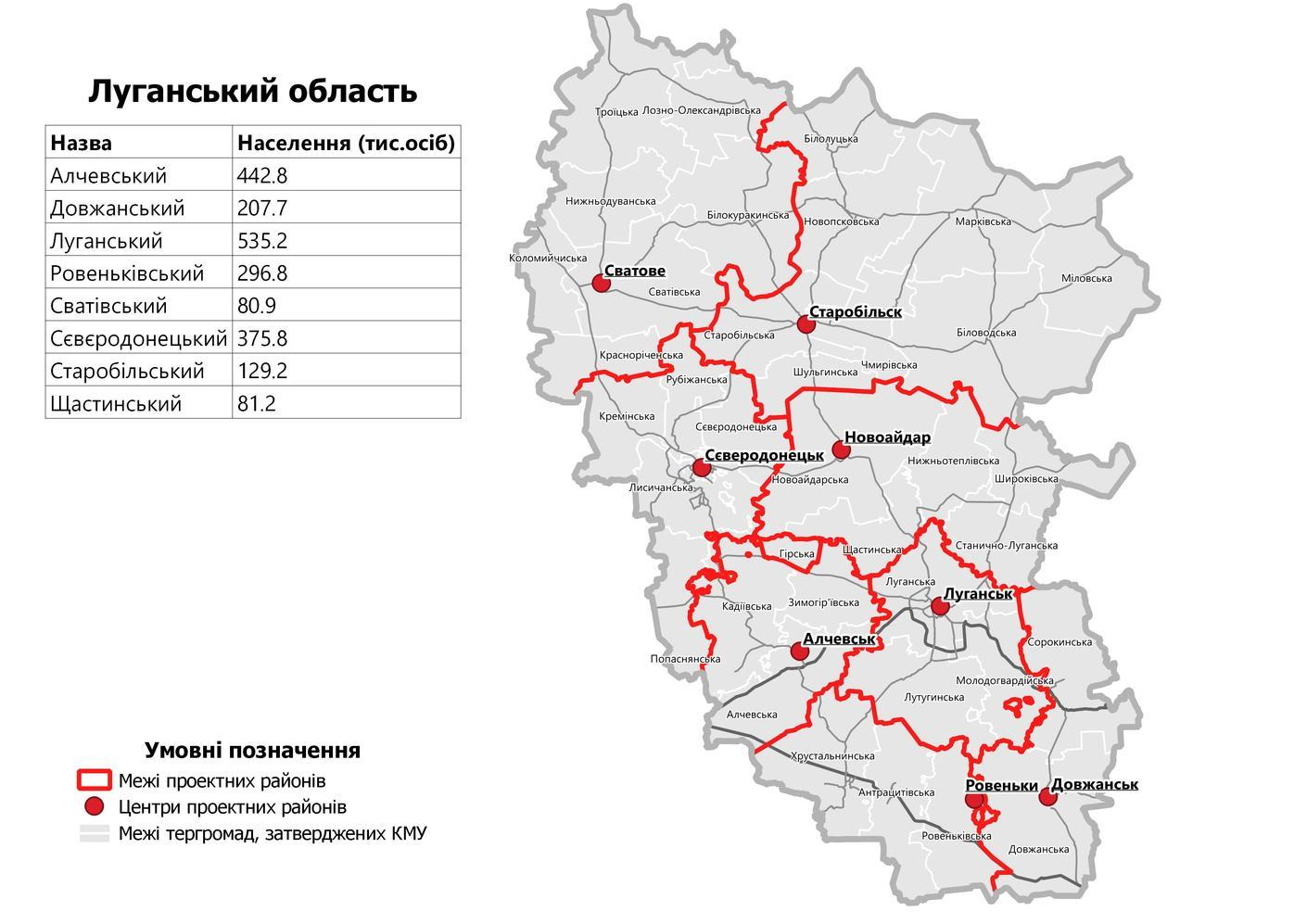
Raions of Luhansk Oblast as of August 2020.

On 18 July 2020, the number of districts was reduced to eight. This includes territories not under control of Ukrainian government, where the old territorial division is in use. The eight districts are:

1. Alchevsk (Алчевський район), the center is in the town of Alchevsk;
2. Dovzhansk (Довжанський район), the center is in the town of Dovzhansk (Sverdlovsk);
3. Luhansk (Луганський район), the center is in the city of Luhansk;
4. Rovenky (Ровеньківський район), the center is in the town of Rovenky;
5. Shchastia (Щастинський район), the center is in the urban-type settlement of Novoaidar;
6. Sievierodonetsk (Сєвєродонецький район), the center is in the city of Sievierodonetsk;
7. Starobilsk (Старобільський район), the center is in the town of Starobilsk;
8. Svatove (Сватівський район), the center is in the town of Svatove.

Luhansk Oblast
As of January 1, 2022
Number of districts (райони)	8
Number of hromadas (громади)	37

== Administrative divisions until 2020 ==
Raions of Luhansk Oblast until 2020. The city of Luhansk is shown in dark blue.

Until 2020, Luhansk Oblast was subdivided into 32 regions: 18 districts (raions) and 14 city municipalities (mis'krada or misto), officially known as territories governed by city councils.

In 2014, the War in Donbas started. As a result, parts of Luhansk Oblast were controlled by the Ukrainian government, whereas the rest was controlled by the forces of the Luhansk People's Republic (LPR). In particular, several raions and city municipalities were split between the government-controlled and LPR-controlled areas. To facilitate the governance, the Verkhovna Rada on 7 October 2014 made some changes in the administrative divisions, so that the localities in the government-controlled areas were grouped into districts. The list below contains LPR-controlled areas as well.

- Cities under the oblast's jurisdiction:
  - Luhansk Municipality
    - Cities and towns under the city's jurisdiction:
      - Luhansk (Луганськ), the administrative center of the oblast
      - Oleksandrivsk (Олександрівськ)
    - Urban-type settlements under the city's jurisdiction:
      - Katerynivka (Катеринівка)
  - Alchevsk (Алчевськ)
  - Antratsyt Municipality
    - Cities and towns under the city's jurisdiction:
      - Antratsyt (Антрацит)
    - Urban-type settlements under the city's jurisdiction:
      - Bokovo-Platove (Боково-Платове)
      - Dubivskyi (Дубівський)
      - Kamiane (Кам'яне)
      - Kripenskyi (Кріпенський)
      - Shchotove (Щотове)
      - Verkhniy Naholchyk (Верхній Нагольчик)
  - Brianka Municipality
    - Cities and towns under the city's jurisdiction:
      - Brianka (Брянка)
    - Urban-type settlements under the city's jurisdiction:
      - Hannivka (Ганнівка)
      - Hlybokyi (Глибокий)
      - Lomuvatka (Ломуватка)
      - Verhulivka (Вергулівка)
      - Yuzhna Lomuvatka (Южна Ломуватка)
  - Kirovsk Municipality
    - Cities and towns under the city's jurisdiction:
      - Kirovsk (Кіровськ)
    - Urban-type settlements under the city's jurisdiction:
      - Chervonohvardiiske (Червоногвардійське)
      - Donetskyi (Донецький)
  - Krasnodon Municipality
    - Cities and towns under the city's jurisdiction:
      - Krasnodon (Краснодон)
      - Molodohvardiisk (Молодогвардійськ)
      - Sukhodilsk (Суходільськ)
    - Urban-type settlements under the city's jurisdiction:
      - Enhelsove (Енгельсове)
      - Hirne (Гірне)
      - Izvaryne (Ізварине)
      - Krasnodarskyi (Краснодарський)
      - Krasnodon (Краснодон)
      - Sievernyi (Сєверний)
      - Sievero-Hundorivskyi (Сєверо-Гундорівський)
      - Uralo-Kavkaz (Урало-Кавказ)
  - Krasnyi Luch Municipality
    - Cities and towns under the city's jurisdiction:
      - Krasnyi Luch (Красний Луч)
      - Miusynsk (Міусинськ)
      - Petrovske (Петровське)
      - Vakhrusheve (Вахрушеве)
    - Urban-type settlements under the city's jurisdiction:
      - Fedorivka (Федорівка)
      - Hrushove (Грушове)
      - Khrustalne (Хрустальне)
      - Kniahynivka (Княгинівка)
      - Sadovo-Khrustalnenskyi (Садово-Хрустальненський)
      - Shterivka (Штерівка)
      - Sofiivskyi (Софіївський)
      - Zaporizhzhia (Запоріжжя)
  - Lysychansk Municipality
    - Cities and towns under the city's jurisdiction:
      - Lysychansk (Лисичанськ)
      - Novodruzhesk (Новодружеськ)
      - Pryvillia (Привілля)
  - Pervomaisk (Первомайськ)
  - Rovenky Municipality
    - Cities and towns under the city's jurisdiction:
      - Rovenky (Ровеньки)
    - Urban-type settlements under the city's jurisdiction:
      - Dzerzhynskyi (Дзержинський)
      - Hirnyk (Гірник)
      - Klenovyi (Кленовий)
      - Mykhaylivka (Михайлівка)
      - Naholno-Tarasivka (Нагольно-Тарасівка)
      - Novodarivka (Новодар'ївка)
      - Proletarskyi (Пролетарський)
      - Tatsyne (Тацине)
      - Velykokamianka (Великокам'янка)
      - Yasenivskyi (Ясенівський)
  - Rubizhne (Рубіжне)
  - Sievierodonetsk Municipality
    - Cities and towns under the city's jurisdiction:
      - Sievierodonetsk (Сєвєродонецьк), the temporary location of the Oblast Administration
    - Urban-type settlements under the city's jurisdiction:
      - Borivske (Борівське)
      - Metiolkine (Метьолкине)
      - Syrotyne (Сиротине)
      - Voronove (Воронове)
  - Stakhanov Municipality
    - Cities and towns under the city's jurisdiction:
      - Almazna (Алмазна)
      - Irmino (Ірміно)
      - Stakhanov (Стаханов)
  - Sverdlovsk Municipality
    - Cities and towns under the city's jurisdiction:
      - Chervonopartyzansk (Червонопартизанськ)
      - Sverdlovsk (Свердловськ)
    - Urban-type settlements under the city's jurisdiction:
      - Kalininskyi (Калінінський)
      - Komsomolskyi (Комсомольський)
      - Leninske (Вальянівське)
      - Pavlivka (Павлівка)
      - Shakhtarske (Шахтарське)
      - Volodarsk (Володарськ)
- Districts (raions):
  - Antratsyt (Антрацитівський район)
    - Urban-type settlements under the district's jurisdiction:
      - Fashchivka (Фащівка)
      - Yesaulivka (Єсаулівка)
      - Ivanivka (Іванівка)
      - Krasnyi Kut (Красний Кут)
      - Malomykolaivka (Маломиколаївка)
      - Nyzhniy Naholchyk (Нижній Нагольчик)
  - Bilokurakyne (Білокуракинський район)
    - Urban-type settlements under the district's jurisdiction:
      - Bilokurakyne (Білокуракине)
      - Lozno-Oleksandrivka (Лозно-Олександрівка)
  - Bilovodsk (Біловодський район)
    - Urban-type settlements under the district's jurisdiction:
      - Bilovodsk (Біловодськ)
  - Krasnodon (Краснодонський район)
    - Urban-type settlements under the district's jurisdiction:
      - Myrne (Мирне)
      - Novooleksandrivka (Новоолександрівка)
      - Novosvitlivka (Новосвітлівка)
      - Simeykyne (Сімейкине)
      - Talove (Талове)
      - Velykyi Loh (Великий Лог)
  - Kreminna (Кремінський район)
    - Cities and towns under the district's jurisdiction:
      - Kreminna (Кремінна)
    - Urban-type settlements under the district's jurisdiction:
      - Krasnorichenske (Красноріченське)
  - Lutuhyne (Лутугинський район)
    - Cities and towns under the district's jurisdiction:
      - Lutuhyne (Лутугине)
    - Urban-type settlements under the district's jurisdiction:
      - Bile (Біле)
      - Bilorichenskyi (Білоріченський)
      - Cheliuskinets (Челюскінець)
      - Heorhiivka (Георгіївка)
      - Lenina (Леніна)
      - Uspenka (Успенка)
      - Vrubivskyi (Врубівський)
      - Yurivka (Юр'ївка)
  - Markivka (Марківський район)
    - Urban-type settlements under the district's jurisdiction:
      - Markivka (Марківка)
  - Milove (Міловський район)
    - Urban-type settlements under the district's jurisdiction:
      - Milove (Мілове)
  - Novoaidar (Новоайдарський район)
    - Cities and towns under the district's jurisdiction:
      - Shchastia (Щастя)
    - Urban-type settlements under the district's jurisdiction:
      - Novoaidar (Новоайдар)
  - Novopskov (Новопсковський район)
    - Urban-type settlements under the district's jurisdiction:
      - Bilolutsk (Білолуцьк)
      - Novopskov (Новопсков)
  - Perevalsk (Перевальський район)
      - Artemivsk (Артемівськ)
      - Perevalsk (Перевальськ)
      - Zorynsk (Зоринськ)
    - Urban-type settlements under the district's jurisdiction:
      - Bairachky (Байрачки)
      - Buhaivka (Бугаївка)
      - Fashchivka (Фащівка)
      - Horodyshche (Городище)
      - Komisarivka (Комісарівка)
      - Mykhailivka (Михайлівка)
      - Seleznivka (Селезнівка)
      - Tsentralnyi (Центральний)
      - Yashchykove (Ящикове)
  - Popasna (Попаснянський район)
    - Cities and towns under the district's jurisdiction:
      - Hirske (Гірське)
      - Popasna (Попасна)
      - Zolote (Золоте)
    - Urban-type settlements under the district's jurisdiction:
      - Bilohorivka (Білогорівка)
      - Chornukhyne (Чорнухине)
      - Kalynove (Калинове)
      - Komyshuvakha (Комишуваха)
      - Maloriazantseve (Малорязанцеве)
      - Myrna Dolyna (Мирна Долина)
      - Nyzhnie (Нижнє)
      - Novotoshkivske (Новотошківське)
      - Toshkivka (Тошківка)
      - Vovchoiarivka (Вовчоярівка)
      - Vrubivka (Врубівка)
  - Slovianoserbsk (Слов'яносербський район)
    - Cities and towns under the district's jurisdiction:
      - Zymohiria (Зимогір'я)
    - Urban-type settlements under the district's jurisdiction:
      - Frunze (Фрунзе)
      - Lotykove (Лотикове)
      - Lozivskyi (Лозівський)
      - Rodakove (Родакове)
      - Slovianoserbsk (Слов'яносербськ)
  - Stanytsia-Luhanska (Станично-Луганський район)
    - Urban-type settlements under the district's jurisdiction:
      - Petropavlivka ( Петропавлівка)
      - Stanytsia Luhanska (Станиця Луганська)
  - Starobilsk (Старобільський район)
    - Cities and towns under the district's jurisdiction:
      - Starobilsk (Старобільськ)
  - Svatove (Сватівський район)
    - Cities and towns under the district's jurisdiction:
      - Svatove (Сватове)
    - Urban-type settlements under the district's jurisdiction:
      - Nyzhnia Duvanka (Нижня Дуванка)
  - Sverdlovsk (Свердловський район)
    - Urban-type settlements under the district's jurisdiction:
      - Biriukove (Бірюкове)
  - Troitske (Троїцький район)
    - Urban-type settlements under the district's jurisdiction:
      - Troitske (Троїцьке)
