= List of cities in Luhansk Oblast =

Location of cities in Luhansk Oblast, with red dots indicating Russian-occupied cities

There are 37 populated places in Luhansk Oblast, Ukraine, that have been officially granted city status (Ukrainian: місто, romanized: misto) by the Verkhovna Rada, the country's parliament. Settlements with more than 10,000 people are eligible for city status, although the status is typically also granted to settlements of historical or regional importance. As of 5 December 2001, the date of the first and only official census in the country since independence, (Note: As of 11 July 2023) the most populous city in the oblast was the regional capital, Luhansk, with a population of 463,097 people, while the least populous city was Almazna, with 5,061 people. Almazna is also the most recent settlement to receive city status, having been granted the status by the Verkhovna Rada in 1977.

From independence in 1991 to 2020, 14 cities in the oblast were designated as cities of regional significance (municipalities), which had self-government under city councils, while the oblast's remaining 23 cities were located in 18 raions (districts) as cities of district significance, which are subordinated to the governments of the raions. On 18 July 2020, an administrative reform abolished and merged the oblast's raions and cities of regional significance into eight new, expanded raions. (Note: The initial administrative reform laws passed in 2020 were not de jure enacted at the time for territories occupied by separatist forces during the Donbas war due to a provision within the laws delaying the creation of new subdivisions in those territories until the Ukrainian government regained their control at some indeterminate future date. On 7 September 2023, an amendment to the original law entered into force which created the new subdivisions for all territories from that date, thereby making them fully legally in effect for the whole oblast since 2023.) The eight raions that make up the oblast are Alchevsk, Dovzhansk, Luhansk, Rovenky, Shchastia, Siverskodonetsk, Starobilsk, and Svatove. (Note: Due to the occupation by separatist forces of the Alchevsk, Dovzhansk, Luhansk, and Rovenky raions at the time of the 2020 administrative reform, the four raions have only de jure status while de facto Russian officials instead use the raions and cities of regional significance from before the 2020 reform. In new territories occupied in the oblast since 24 February 2022, Russian appointed officials have also imposed the use of the pre-reform administrative divisions.) After the enactment of decommunization laws, nine cities within the oblast were renamed in 2016 for their former names' connection to people, places, events, and organizations associated with the Soviet Union. (Note: Due to the occupation by separatist forces of all nine cities at the time of the 2016 renaming, the nine cities' new names have only de jure status while de facto Russian officials continue to use the pre-2016 names.) The renamed cities are Bokovo-Khrustalne, Dovzhansk, Holubivka, Kadiivka, Khrustalnyi, Kypuche, Petrovo-Krasnosillia, Sorokyne, and Voznesenivka, which were previously named Vakhrusheve, Sverdlovsk, Kirovsk, Stakhanov, Krasnyi Luch, Artemivsk, Petrovske, Krasnodon, and Chervonopartyzansk, respectively. In 2024, following the passage of derussification laws, the cities Molodohvardiisk, Pervomaisk, and Sievierodonetsk were de jure renamed Otamanivka, Sokolohirsk, and Siverskodonetsk, respectively.

Following the Donbas war, pro-Russian separatist forces occupied all 25 cities located in the Alchevsk, Dovzhansk, Luhansk, and Rovenky raions by 2014. Additional cities were occupied by Russian troops after 24 February 2022, during Russia's full-scale invasion of Ukraine. Since the withdrawal of Ukrainian forces from Lysychansk on 3 July 2022, all cities in the oblast have been occupied by Russian forces.

== List of cities ==
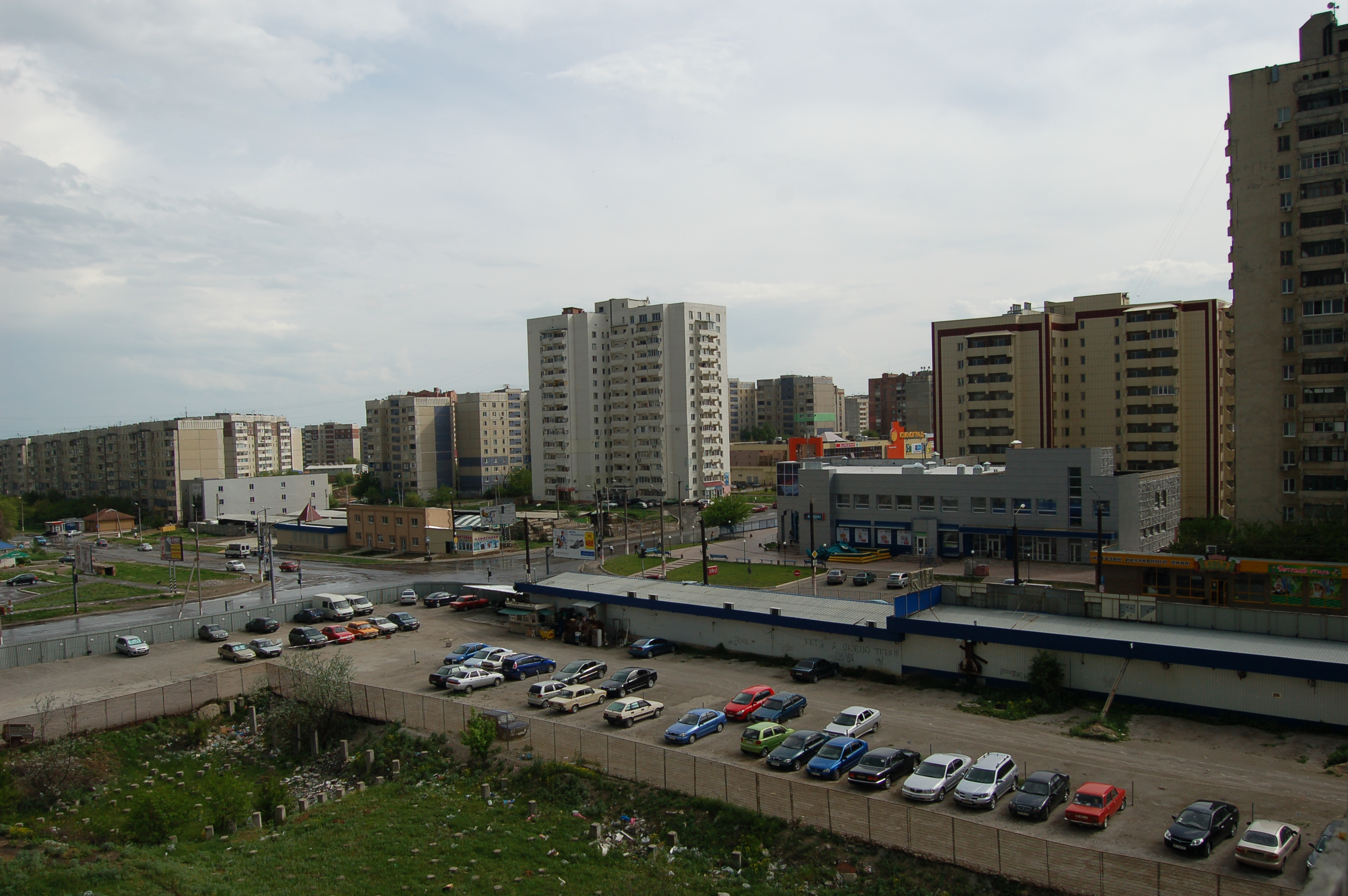
Luhansk, capital and most populous city in Luhansk Oblast

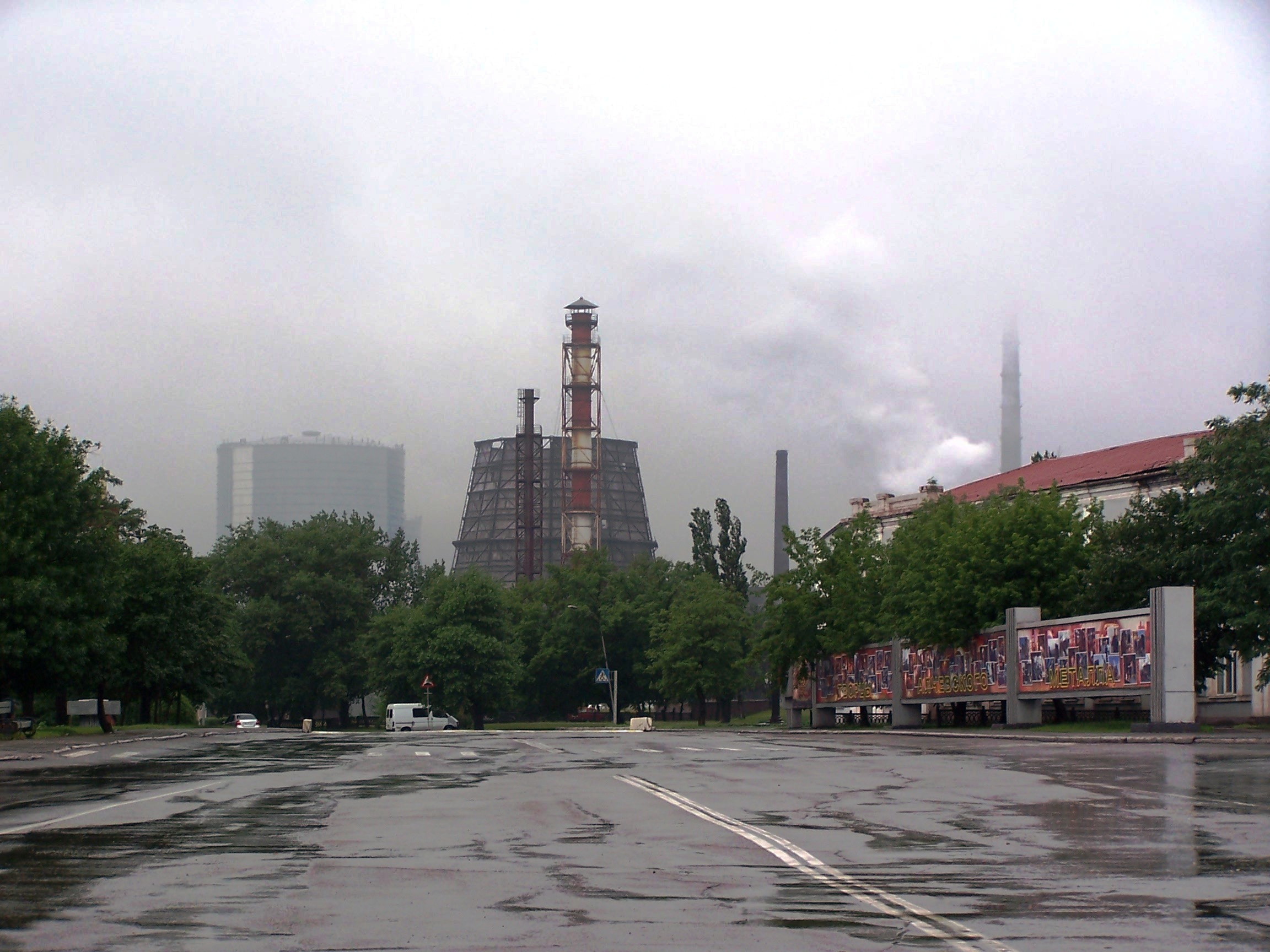
Alchevsk, second most populous city and major industrial center in the Donbas

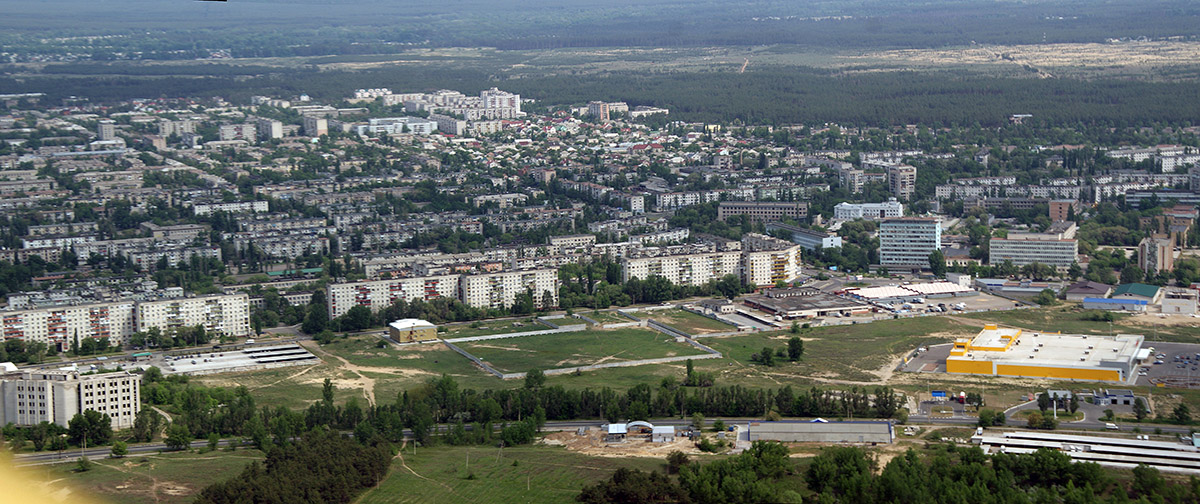
Siverskodonetsk, third most populous city and de facto capital from 2014 until its occupation in 2022

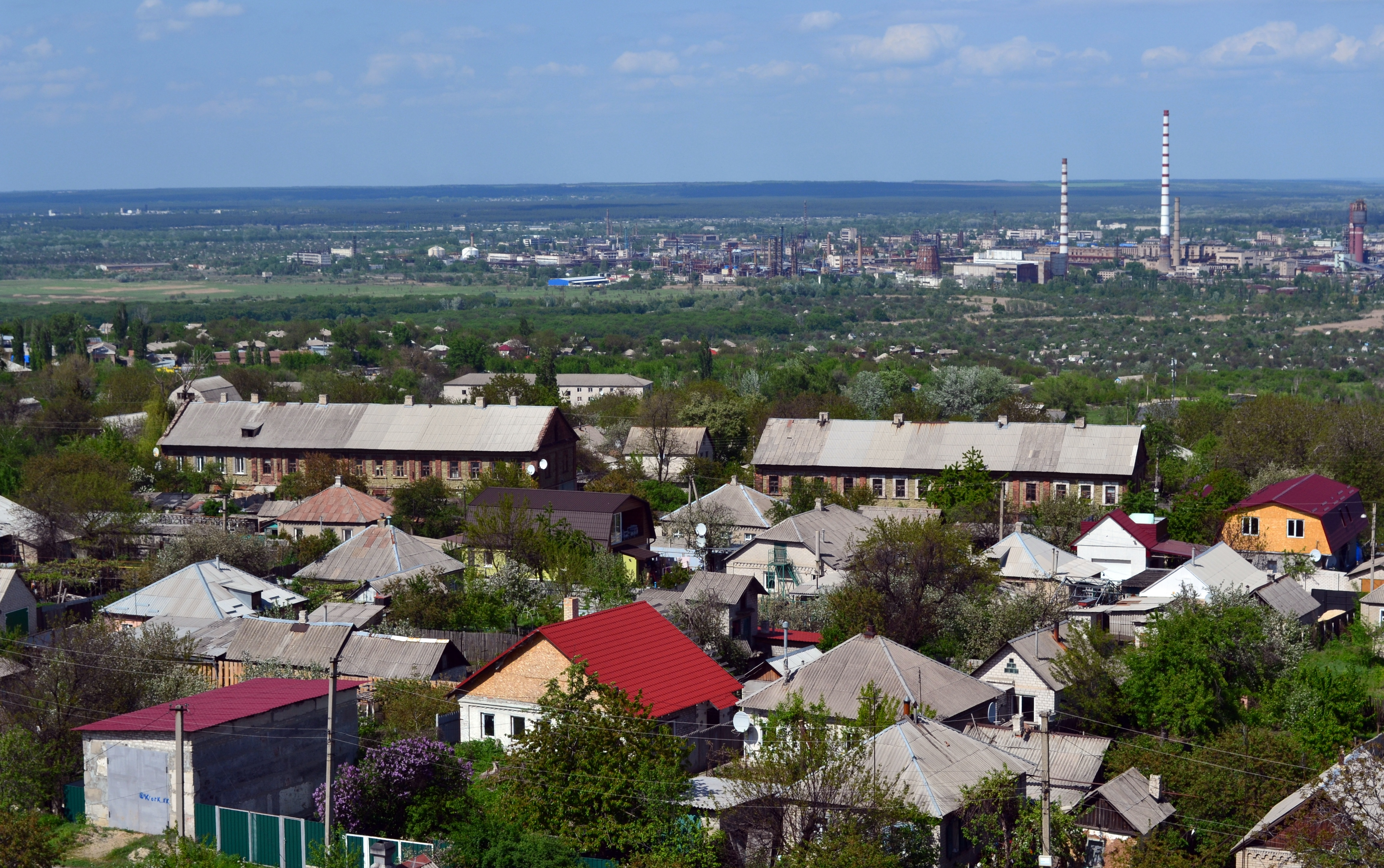
Lysychansk, twin city of Siverskodonetsk that was the last city in the oblast to be captured by Russian forces during its invasion

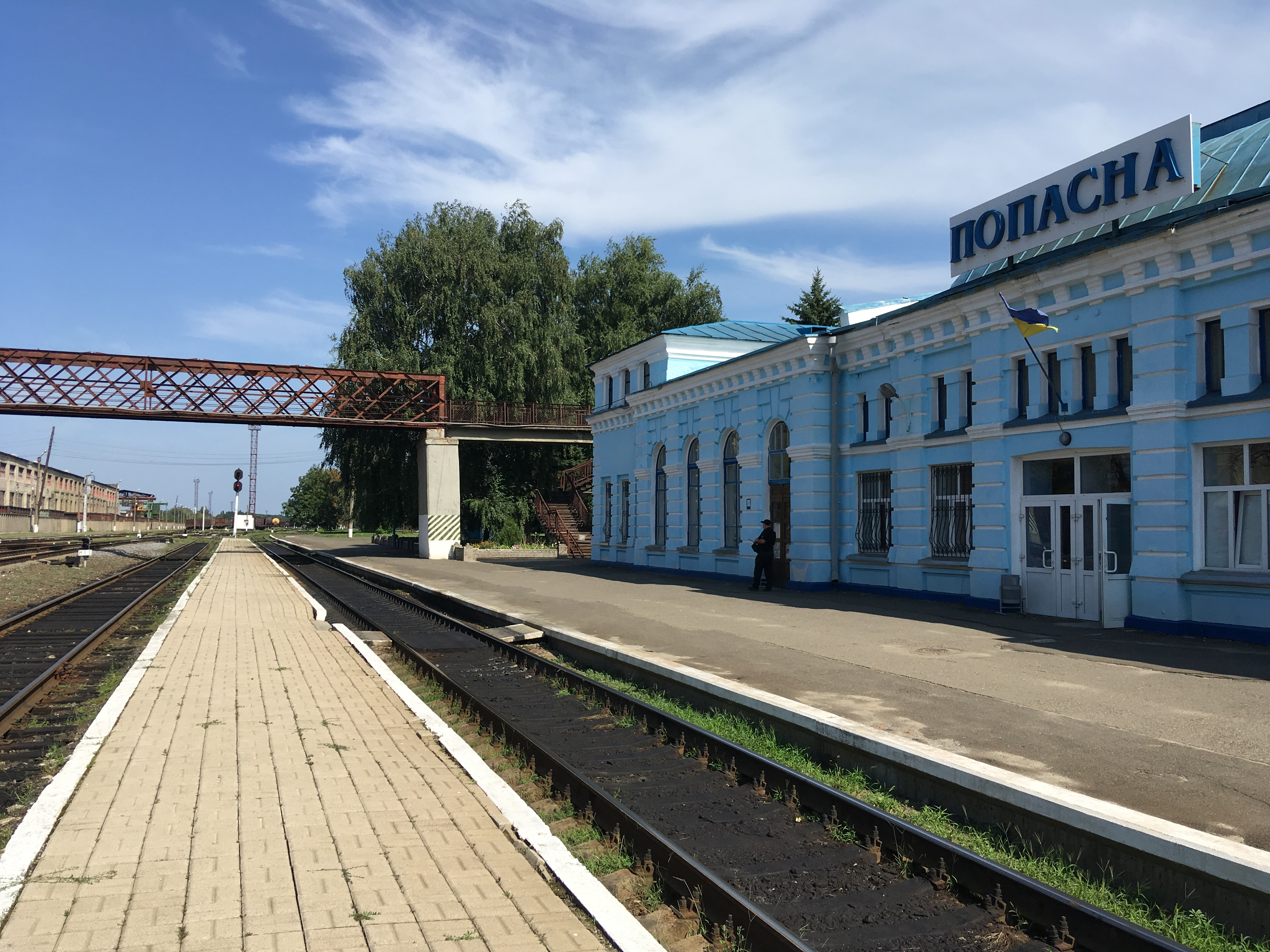
Popasna, a key railway city heavily damaged during the invasion

Cities in Luhansk Oblast
Name	Name (in Ukrainian) (Note: Links to the Ukrainian Wikipedia articles for each city)	Raion (district)	Population (2022 estimates)	Population (2001 census)	Population change
Alchevsk	Алчевськ	Alchevsk	106,062	119,193	−11.02%
Almazna	Алмазна	Alchevsk	4,148	5,061	−18.04%
Antratsyt	Антрацит	Rovenky	52,150	63,698	−18.13%
Bokovo-Khrustalne	Боково-Хрустальне	Rovenky	11,421	14,773	−22.69%
Brianka	Брянка	Alchevsk	44,760	54,767	−18.27%
Dovzhansk	Довжанськ	Dovzhansk	62,691	72,531	−13.57%
Hirske	Гірське	Siverskodonetsk	9,100	11,473	−20.68%
Holubivka	Голубівка	Alchevsk	26,654	35,199	−24.28%
Irmino (Note: Known as Teplohirsk at the time of the 2001 census (renamed in 2010))	Ірміно	Alchevsk	9,270	13,053	−28.98%
Kadiivka	Кадіївка	Alchevsk	73,248	90,152	−18.75%
Khrustalnyi	Хрустальний	Rovenky	79,533	94,875	−16.17%
Kreminna	Кремінна	Siverskodonetsk	18,116	24,447	−25.90%
Kypuche	Кипуче	Alchevsk	7,162	9,097	−21.27%
Luhansk	Луганськ	Luhansk	397,677	463,097	−14.13%
Lutuhyne	Лутугине	Luhansk	17,061	18,833	−9.41%
Lysychansk	Лисичанськ	Siverskodonetsk	93,340	115,229	−19.00%
Miusynsk	Міусинськ	Rovenky	4,596	6,029	−23.77%
Novodruzhesk	Новодружеськ	Siverskodonetsk	6,705	9,025	−25.71%
Oleksandrivsk	Олександрівськ	Luhansk	6,401	7,045	−9.14%
Otamanivka	Отаманівка	Luhansk	22,449	25,528	−12.06%
Perevalsk	Перевальськ	Alchevsk	24,817	29,665	−16.34%
Petrovo-Krasnosillia	Петрово-Красносілля	Rovenky	12,642	15,478	−18.32%
Popasna	Попасна	Siverskodonetsk	19,199	25,951	−26.02%
Pryvillia	Привілля	Siverskodonetsk	6,520	9,004	−27.59%
Rovenky	Ровеньки	Rovenky	45,514	53,725	−15.28%
Rubizhne	Рубіжне	Siverskodonetsk	55,247	65,322	−15.42%
Shchastia	Щастя	Shchastia	11,411	13,770	−17.13%
Siverskodonetsk	Сіверськодонецьк	Siverskodonetsk	99,067	119,940	−17.40%
Sokolohirsk	Сокологірськ	Alchevsk	36,091	43,082	−16.23%
Sorokyne	Сорокине	Dovzhansk	42,315	50,560	−16.31%
Starobilsk	Старобільськ	Starobilsk	15,947	22,371	−28.72%
Sukhodilsk	Суходільськ	Dovzhansk	20,390	23,642	−13.76%
Svatove	Сватове	Svatove	16,145	19,495	−17.18%
Voznesenivka	Вознесенівка	Dovzhansk	15,218	17,680	−13.93%
Zolote	Золоте	Siverskodonetsk	13,007	17,836	−27.07%
Zorynsk	Зоринськ	Alchevsk	7,096	8,838	−19.71%
Zymohiria	Зимогір'я	Alchevsk	9,557	11,295	−15.39%

== See also ==
- List of cities in Ukraine
