= Zelenyi Hai, Rovenky Raion, Luhansk Oblast =

Ukrainian VIllage

Coordinates: 48°11′12″N 38°57′40″E

Zelenyi Hai (Ukrainian: Зелений Гай) is a village in Khrustalnyi urban hromada, Rovenky Raion, Luhansk Oblast, Ukraine.
