= Malomykolaivka, Luhansk Oblast =

Urban locality in Luhansk Oblast, Ukraine

Malomykolaivka Маломиколаївка
- Rural settlement
- Location of Malomykolaivka within Luhansk Oblast#Location of Malomykolaivka within Ukraine Malomykolaivka (Ukraine)
- Coordinates: 48°18′25″N 39°01′19″E
- Country: Ukraine
- Oblast: Luhansk Oblast
- Raion: Rovenky Raion
- Hromada: Khrustalnyi urban hromada
- Elevation: 171 m (561 ft)

Population (2022)
  - Total: 1,642
- Time zone: UTC+2 (EET)
  - Summer (DST): UTC+3 (EEST)
- Postal code: 94642
- Area code: +380 6431

Malomykolaivka (Ukrainian: Маломиколаївка) is a rural settlement in Rovenky Raion in Luhansk Oblast of eastern Ukraine. Population: 1,642 (2022 estimate)

== Demographics ==
Native language distribution as of the Ukrainian Census of 2001:

- Ukrainian: 41.84%
- Russian: 56.77%
- Others 1.39%
