= Khrustalne =

Urban locality in Luhansk Oblast, Ukraine

Khrustalne Хрустальне
- Rural settlement
- Location of Khrustalne Khrustalne (Ukraine)
- Coordinates: 48°8′44″N 38°51′22″E
- Country: Ukraine
- Oblast: Luhansk Oblast
- Raion: Rovenky Raion
- Hromada: Khrustalnyi urban hromada
- Elevation: 224 m (735 ft)

Population (2022)
  - Total: 1,339
- Postal code: 94546
- Area code: +380 6432

Khrustalne (Ukrainian: Хрустальне; Russian: Хрустальное) is a rural settlement in the Rovenky Raion of the Luhansk Oblast of Ukraine. Population: 1,339 (2022 estimate)
