= Lutuhyne urban hromada =

Lutuhyne urban hromada Лутугинська міська громада
- Hromada
- Interactive map of Lutuhyne urban hromada
- Country: Ukraine
- Oblast: Luhansk
- Raion: Luhansk
- Settlements: 39
- Cities: 1
- Rural settlements: 9
- Villages: 23
- Towns: 6

Lutuhyne urban hromada (Ukrainian: Лутугинська міська громада) is a hromada of Ukraine, located in Luhansk Raion, Luhansk Oblast. Its administrative center is the city Lutuhyne.

The hromada contains 35 settlements: 1 city (Lutuhyne), 15 rural settlements:

- Bilorichenskyi
- Cheliuskinets
- Heorhiivka
- Klechne
- Komsomolets
- Komyshuvakha
- Lisne
- Mariia
- Myrne
- Novopavlivka
- Shymshinivka
- Uspenka
- Vrubivskyi
- Yasne
- Zbirne

and 23 villages:

- Peremozhne
- Volnukhine
- Verkhnya Orihivka
- Maryivka
- Novofedorivka
- Petro-Mykolaivka
- Illyria
- Velika Martynivka
- Zahidne
- Mala Martynivka
- Mala Yuryivka
- Ushakivka
- Kamianka
- Bokove
- Makedonivka
- Paliivka
- Orihivka
- Kruhlik
- Novobulakhivka
- Shovkova Protoka
- Pershozvanivka
- Hlafirivka
- Pyatihorivka

== See also ==
- List of hromadas of Ukraine
