= Shterivka =

Urban locality in Luhansk Oblast, Ukraine

Shterivka Штерівка
- Rural settlement
- Location of Shterivka Shterivka (Ukraine)
- Coordinates: 48°19′6″N 38°56′45″E
- Country: Ukraine
- Oblast: Luhansk Oblast
- Raion: Rovenky Raion
- Hromada: Khrustalnyi urban hromada
- Elevation: 254 m (833 ft)

Population (2022)
  - Total: 1,216
- Postal code: 94546
- Area code: +380 6432

Shterivka (Ukrainian: Штерівка; Russian: Штеровка) is a rural settlement in the Rovenky Raion of the Luhansk Oblast of Ukraine. Population: 1,216 (2022 estimate)
