= Ivanivka, Luhansk Oblast =

Urban locality in Luhansk Oblast, Ukraine

Ivanivka Іванівка
- Rural settlement
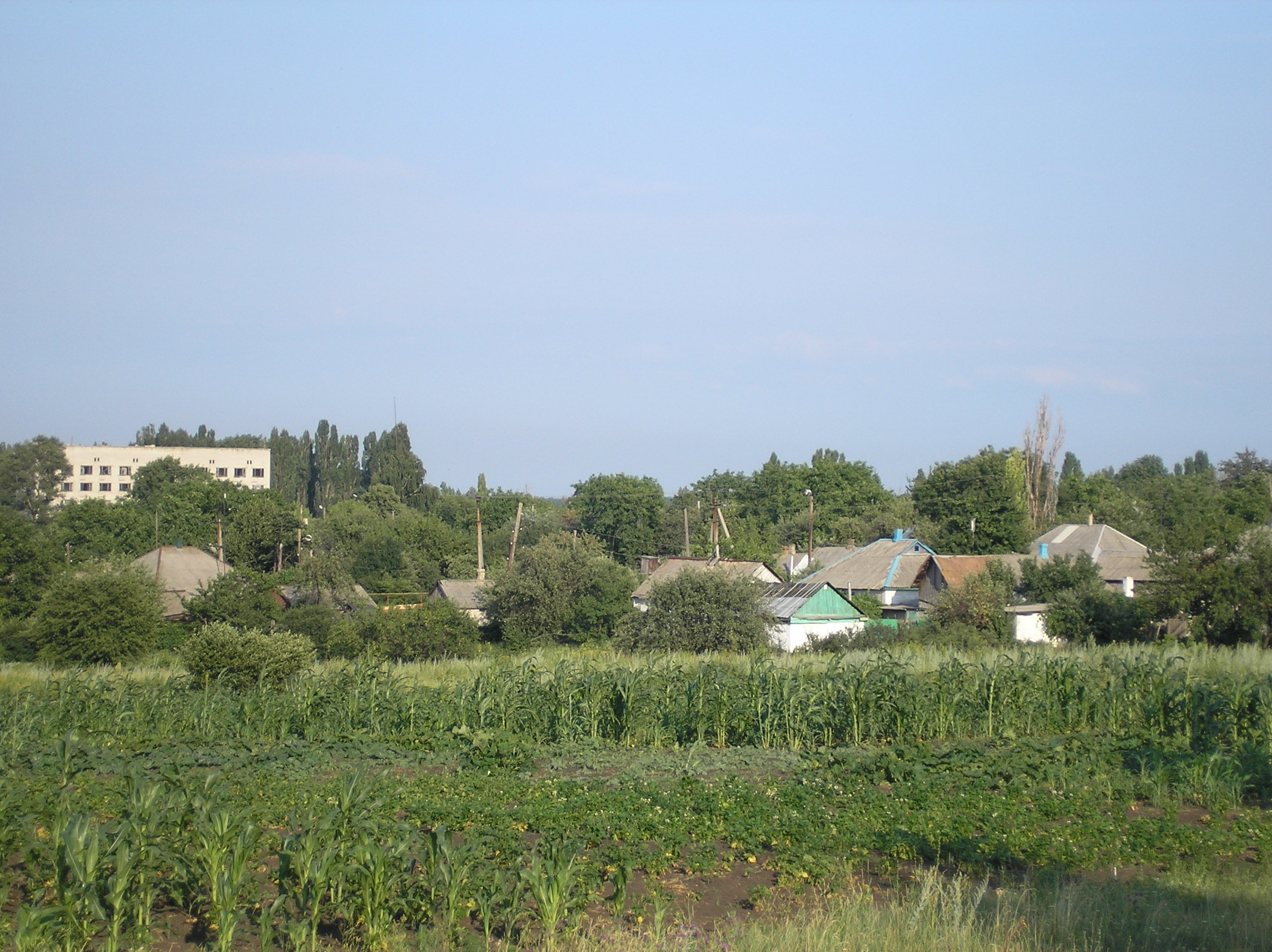

- Location of Ivanivka within Luhansk Oblast#Location of Ivanivka within Ukraine Ivanivka (Ukraine)
- Coordinates: 48°13′57″N 38°57′09″E
- Country: Ukraine
- Oblast: Luhansk Oblast
- Raion: Rovenky Raion
- Hromada: Khrustalnyi urban hromada
- Founded: 1771
- Elevation: 331 m (1,086 ft)

Population (2022)
  - Total: 7,038
- Time zone: UTC+2 (EET)
  - Summer (DST): UTC+3 (EEST)
- Postal code: 94644
- Area code: +380 6431

Ivanivka (Ukrainian: Іванівка) is a rural settlement in Rovenky Raion (district) in Luhansk Oblast of eastern Ukraine. Population: 7,038 (2022 estimate)

== Geography ==
Ivanivka is located in the central part of Donets Basin.

== History ==
In 1900, an iron foundry was founded in Ivanivka. During World War II, Ivanivka was occupied by Nazi Germany from July 1942 to February 1943.

It was formerly a district centre and had the status of urban-type settlement.

== Demographics ==
Native language distribution as of the Ukrainian Census of 2001:

- Ukrainian: 17.18%
- Russian: 82.42%
- Others 0.07%

== Economy ==
Ivanivka is a centre of machine building and food industry.

== Notable people ==
- Serhii Mazlakh (1878–1937), Ukrainian Communist politician.
