= Mykhailivka, Rovenky Raion, Luhansk Oblast =

Urban locality in Luhansk Oblast, Ukraine

Mykhailivka Михайлівка
- Rural settlement
- Location of Mykhailivka Mykhailivka (Ukraine)
- Coordinates: 48°04′06″N 39°15′48″E
- Country: Ukraine
- Oblast: Luhansk
- Raion: Rovenky
- Elevation: 207 m (679 ft)

Population (2022)
  - Total: 2,765
- Postal code: 94790
- Area code: +380 6433

Mykhailivka (Ukrainian: Михайлівка; Russian: Михайловка) is a rural settlement in the Rovenky Raion of the Luhansk Oblast of Ukraine. Population: 2,765 (2022 estimate)
