= Fashchivka, Rovenky Raion, Luhansk Oblast =

Urban locality in Luhansk Oblast, Ukraine

Fashchivka Фащівка
- Rural settlement
- Location of Fashchivka within Luhansk Oblast#Location of Fashchivka within Ukraine Fashchivka (Ukraine)
- Coordinates: 48°13′10″N 38°40′07″E
- Country: Ukraine
- Oblast: Luhansk Oblast
- Raion: Rovenky Raion
- Hromada: Khrustalnyi urban hromada
- Founded: 1773
- Elevation: 319 m (1,047 ft)

Population (2022)
  - Total: 2,245
- Time zone: UTC+2 (EET)
  - Summer (DST): UTC+3 (EEST)
- Postal code: 94652
- Area code: +380 6431

Fashchivka (Ukrainian: Фащівка) is a rural settlement in Khrustalnyi urban hromada, Rovenky Raion, Luhansk Oblast (region) of Ukraine, currently occupied by Russia. Population: 2,245 (2022 estimate)

== Demographics ==
Native language distribution as of the Ukrainian Census of 2001:

- Ukrainian: 2.28%
- Russian: 97.44%
- Others 0.28%
