= Fedorivka, Luhansk Oblast =

Urban locality in Luhansk Oblast, Ukraine

Fedorivka Федорівка
- Rural settlement
- Location of Fedorivka Fedorivka (Ukraine)
- Coordinates: 48°18′59″N 38°51′0″E
- Country: Ukraine
- Oblast: Luhansk Oblast
- Raion: Rovenky Raion
- Hromada: Khrustalnyi urban hromada
- Elevation: 284 m (932 ft)

Population (2022)
  - Total: 413
- Postal code: 94546
- Area code: +380 6432

Fedorivka (Ukrainian: Федорівка; Russian: Фёдоровка) is a rural settlement in the Rovenky Raion of the Luhansk Oblast of Ukraine. Population: 413 (2022 estimate)
