= Khrustalnyi urban hromada =

Khrustalnyi urban hromada Хрустальненська міська громада
- Hromada
- Interactive map of Khrustalnyi urban hromada
- Country: Ukraine
- Oblast: Luhansk
- Raion: Rovenky
- Settlements: 44
- Cities: 4
- Villages: 28
- Towns: 12

Khrustalnyi urban hromada (Ukrainian: Хрустальненська міська громада) is a hromada of Ukraine, located in Rovenky Raion, Luhansk Oblast. Its administrative center is the city Khrustalnyi.

The hromada contains 44 settlements: 4 cities (Khrustalnyi, Bokovo-Khrustalne, Miusynsk, and Petrovo-Krasnosillia), 12 rural settlements (Hrushove, Zaporizhzhia, Ivanivka, Kniahynivka, Krasnyi Kut, Malomykolaivka, Sadovo-Khrustalnenskyi, Sofiivskyi, Faschivka, Fedorivka, Khrustalne, and Shterivka), and 28 villages:

- Bashtevych
- Butkevych
- Verhulivske
- Voskresenivka
- Hannivka
- Davydivka
- Yelyzavetivka
- Zherebyache
- Zazhidne
- Zelenyi Hai
- Industriya
- Kovylne
- Kozakivka
- Komendantske
- Korinne
- Krasnoluckyi
- Kurhan
- Lisne
- Mykytivka
- Novoyelyzavetivka
- Orlivske
- Sonyachne
- Stepove
- Tamara
- Trubnyi
- Urozhaine
- Zhrustalnyi
- Shyrokyi

== See also ==
- List of hromadas of Ukraine
