= Krasnyi Kut, Luhansk Oblast =

Urban locality in Luhansk Oblast, Ukraine

Krasnyi Kut Красний Кут
- Rural settlement
- Location of Krasnyi Kut within Luhansk Oblast#Location of Krasnyi Kut within Ukraine Krasnyi Kut (Ukraine)
- Coordinates: 48°12′43″N 38°46′36″E
- Country: Ukraine
- Oblast: Luhansk Oblast
- Raion: Rovenky Raion
- Hromada: Khrustalnyi urban hromada
- Founded: 1775
- Elevation: 149 m (489 ft)

Population (2022)
  - Total: 2,400
- Time zone: UTC+2 (EET)
  - Summer (DST): UTC+3 (EEST)
- Postal code: 94654
- Area code: +380 6431

Krasnyi Kut (Ukrainian: Красний Кут) is a rural settlement in Rovenky Raion (district) in Luhansk Oblast of eastern Ukraine. Population: 2,400 (2022 estimate)

== Demographics ==
Native language distribution as of the Ukrainian Census of 2001:

- Ukrainian: 88.29%
- Russian: 11.55%
- Others 0.16%

== Notable people ==
- Yuriy Solod (born 1972), Ukrainian politician and People's Deputy of Ukraine
