= Vakhrushevo =

Vakhrushevo may refer to:

- Vakhrusheve, a town in Luhansk Oblast, Ukraine
- Vakhrushevo, Krasnoyarsk Krai, a village in Krasnoyarsk Krai, Russia
- Vakhrushevo, a former urban-type settlement in Chelyabinsk Oblast, Russia; since 2004 a part of the town of Kopeysk
