= Shchotove =

Urban locality in Luhansk Oblast, Ukraine

Shchotove Щотове
- Rural settlement
- Location in Ukraine Shchotove (Ukraine)
- Coordinates: 48°10′29″N 39°06′43″E
- Country: Ukraine
- Oblast: Luhansk Oblast
- District: Rovenky Raion
- Founded: 1783
- Elevation: 312 m (1,024 ft)

Population (2022)
  - Total: 3,535
- Time zone: UTC+2 (EET)
  - Summer (DST): UTC+3 (EEST)
- Postal code: 94621
- Area code: +380 6431

Shchotove (Ukrainian: Щотове) is a rural settlement in Rovenky Raion (district) in Luhansk Oblast of eastern Ukraine. Population: 3,535 (2022 estimate)

== Demographics ==
Native language distribution as of the Ukrainian Census of 2001:

- Ukrainian: 13.52%
- Russian: 82.35%
- Romanian: 3.53%
- Others 0.05%
