= Sadovo-Khrustalnenskyi =

Urban locality in Luhansk Oblast, Ukraine

Sadovo-Khrustalnenskyi Садово-Хрустальненський
- Rural settlement
- Location of Sadovo-Khrustalnenskyi Sadovo-Khrustalnenskyi (Ukraine)
- Coordinates: 48°9′3″N 38°43′40″E
- Country: Ukraine
- Oblast: Luhansk Oblast
- Raion: Rovenky Raion
- Hromada: Khrustalnyi urban hromada
- Elevation: 191 m (627 ft)

Population (2022)
  - Total: 571
- Postal code: 94546
- Area code: +380 6432

Sadovo-Khrustalnenskyi (Ukrainian: Садово-Хрустальненський; Russian: Садово-Хрустальненский) is a rural settlement in the Rovenky Raion of the Luhansk Oblast of Ukraine. Population: 571 (2022 estimate)
