= Nyzhnii Naholchyk =

Urban locality in Luhansk Oblast, Ukraine

Nyzhnii Naholchyk Нижній Нагольчик
- Rural settlement
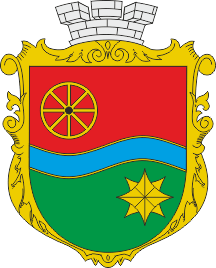
- Coat of arms

- Location of Nyzhnii Naholchyk within Luhansk Oblast Location of Nyzhnii Naholchyk within Ukraine
- Coordinates: 48°01′01″N 39°03′46″E
- Country: Ukraine
- Oblast: Luhansk Oblast
- Raion: Rovenky Raion
- Founded: 1801
- Elevation: 171 m (561 ft)

Population (2022)
  - Total: 1,626
- Time zone: UTC+2 (EET)
  - Summer (DST): UTC+3 (EEST)
- Postal code: 94687
- Area code: +380 6431

Nyzhnii Naholchyk (Ukrainian: Нижній Нагольчик) is a rural settlement in Rovenky Raion (district) in Luhansk Oblast of eastern Ukraine. Population: 1,626 (2022 estimate)

== Demographics ==
Native language distribution as of the Ukrainian Census of 2001:

- Ukrainian: 85.79%
- Russian: 14.16%
- Others 0.05%
