= Sofiivskyi =

Urban locality in Luhansk Oblast, Ukraine

Sofiivskyi Софіївський
- Rural settlement
- Location of Sofiivskyi Sofiivskyi (Ukraine)
- Coordinates: 48°12′32″N 38°53′1″E
- Country: Ukraine
- Oblast: Luhansk Oblast
- Raion: Rovenky Raion
- Hromada: Khrustalnyi urban hromada
- Elevation: 312 m (1,024 ft)

Population (2022)
  - Total: 3,828
- Postal code: 94554
- Area code: +380 6432

Sofiivskyi (Ukrainian: Софіївський; Russian: Софиевский) is a rural settlement in the Rovenky Raion of the Luhansk Oblast of Ukraine. Population: 3,828 (2022 estimate)
