= Hrushove =

Urban locality in Luhansk Oblast, Ukraine

Hrushove Грушове
- Rural settlement
- Location of Hrushove Hrushove (Ukraine)
- Coordinates: 48°14′49″N 38°48′33″E
- Country: Ukraine
- Oblast: Luhansk Oblast
- Raion: Rovenky Raion
- Hromada: Khrustalnyi urban hromada
- Elevation: 280 m (920 ft)

Population (2022)
  - Total: 830
- Postal code: 94546
- Area code: +380 6432

Hrushove (Ukrainian: Грушове; Russian: Грушёвое) is a rural settlement in the Rovenky Raion of the Luhansk Oblast of Ukraine. Population: 830 (2022 estimate)
