= Kniahynivka =

Urban locality in Luhansk Oblast, Ukraine

Kniahynivka Княгинівка
- Rural settlement
- Location of Kniahynivka Kniahynivka (Ukraine)
- Coordinates: 48°7′8″N 38°51′23″E
- Country: Ukraine
- Oblast: Luhansk Oblast
- Raion: Rovenky Raion
- Hromada: Khrustalnyi urban hromada
- Elevation: 100 m (330 ft)

Population (2022)
  - Total: 816
- Postal code: 94546
- Area code: +380 6432

Kniahynivka (Ukrainian: Княгинівка; Russian: Княгиневка) is a rural settlement in the Rovenky Raion of the Luhansk Oblast of Ukraine. Population: 816 (2022 estimate)
