= Zaporizhzhia, Luhansk Oblast =

Urban locality in Luhansk Oblast, Ukraine

Zaporizhzhia Запоріжжя
- Rural settlement
- Location of Zaporizhzhia Zaporizhzhia (Ukraine)
- Coordinates: 48°15′55″N 38°43′15″E
- Country: Ukraine
- Oblast: Luhansk Oblast
- Raion: Rovenky Raion
- Hromada: Khrustalnyi urban hromada
- Elevation: 281 m (922 ft)

Population (2022)
  - Total: 843
- Postal code: 94551
- Area code: +380 6432

Zaporizhzhia (Ukrainian: Запоріжжя; Russian: Запорожье) is a rural settlement in the Rovenky Raion of the Luhansk Oblast of Ukraine. Population: 843 (2022 estimate)
