= Mariia, Ukraine =

Urban locality in Luhansk Oblast, Ukraine

Mariia Марія
- Rural settlement
- Interactive map of Mariia
- Location of Lenina within Luhansk Oblast#Location of Lenina within Ukraine Mariia (Ukraine)
- Coordinates: 48°25′31″N 39°08′59″E
- Country: Ukraine
- Oblast: Luhansk Oblast
- Raion: Luhansk Raion
- Hromada: Lutuhyne urban hromada
- Founded: 1896
- Elevation: 184 m (604 ft)

Population (2022)
  - Total: 1,032
- Time zone: UTC+2 (EET)
  - Summer (DST): UTC+3 (EEST)
- Postal code: 92021
- Area code: +380 6436

Mariia (Ukrainian: Марія; Russian: Ленина) is a rural settlement in Lutuhyne urban hromada, Luhansk Raion, Luhansk Oblast (region), Ukraine. Population: 1,032 (2022 estimate)

== History ==
In spring 2014, during the war in Donbas, Lenina, along with all other settlements in what was then Lutuhyne Raion, was taken over by the Luhansk People's Republic, an unrecognized breakaway state widely described as a puppet state of Russia.

In 2016, as part of decommunization in Ukraine, Lenina was officially renamed by the Ukrainian government to Mariia.

== Demographics ==
The estimate of the town's population as of 2022 is 1,032 people.

Native language distribution as of the Ukrainian Census of 2001:

- Ukrainian: 30.83%
- Russian: 68.72%
- Others 0.46%
