= Petrovske =

City in Luhansk Oblast, Ukraine

Petrovske Петровське Petrovo-Krasnosillia
- City
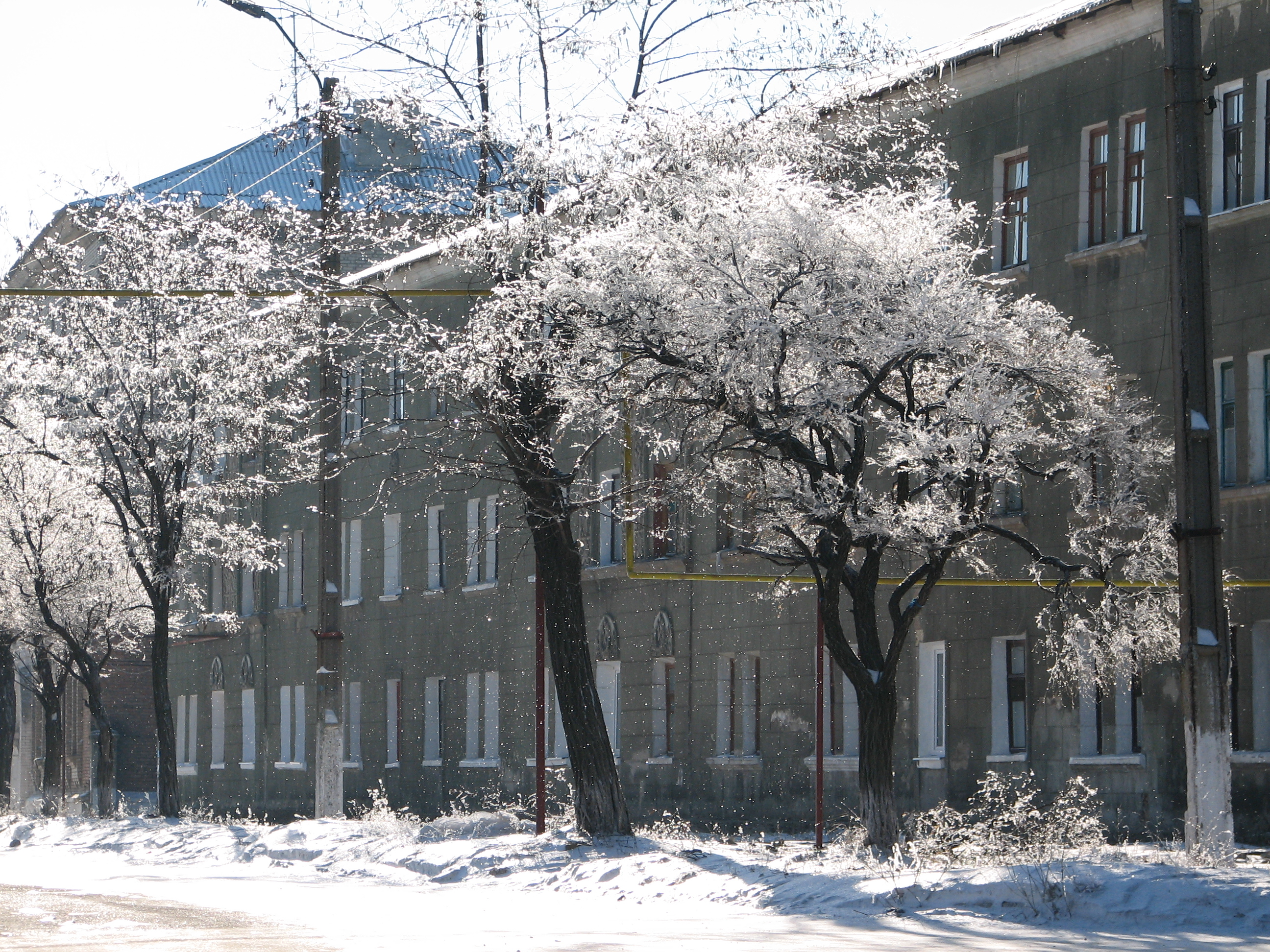
- Central city

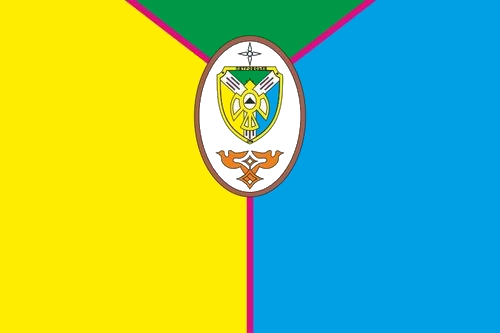
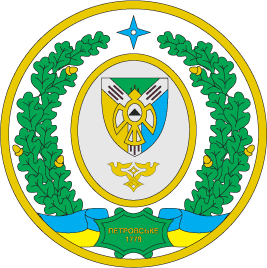
- Flag Coat of arms
- Interactive map of Petrovske
- Location within Ukraine Location within Luhansk Oblast
- Coordinates: 48°17′N 38°53′E
- Country: Ukraine
- Oblast: Luhansk Oblast
- Raion: Rovenky Raion
- Hromada: Khrustalnyi urban hromada
- Population (2022): 12,642
- Climate: Dfb

Petrovske (Ukrainian: Петровське; Russian: Петровское) or Petrovo-Krasnosillia (Ukrainian: Петрово-Красносілля) is a city in Khrustalnyi urban hromada, Rovenky Raion, Luhansk Oblast (region) of Ukraine, currently occupied by Russia. It has a population of 12,642 (2022 estimate).

== History ==
In 1962, Petrovske was made subordinate to the municipality of Krasnyi Luch. Petrovske was granted city status in 1963.

In 2014, Petrovske was taken over by the proxy Luhansk People's Republic (LPR) during the war in Donbas, and has since been under de facto Russian occupation. In April 2015, Petrovske was the sight of intra-rebel infighting, with either LPR proxy forces or actual Russian special forces attempting to violently expel formerly allied Cossack separatists from the city. In 2016, as part of decommunization in Ukraine, Petrovske was renamed to Petrovo-Krasnosillia by the Ukrainian government. However, due to the occupation of the city by Russia, it is still often referred to by the communist-era name. In 2020, Ukraine enacted administrative reforms that officially designated the city as part of Khrustalnyi urban hromada, Rovenky Raion.

== Economy ==
Petrovske has a factory that makes concrete products, along with other industrial enterprises.

== Demographics ==
Historical population
Year	Pop.	±% p.a.
1974	20,500	—
2013	13,260	−1.11%
2022	12,642	−0.53%

Petrovske's population has declined in recent years, from 13,260 (2013 est.) to 12,642 as of the most recent estimate in 2022.

According to ethnic and native language data from the 2001 Ukrainian census, Ukrainians make up the majority of the population, yet the city is a predominantly Russian-speaking (76.4%), with a significant Ukrainian-speaking minority (22.4%), as well as a much smaller Belarusian-speaking minority (0.1%). The exact ethnic and linguistic composition was as follows:

Ethnic groups in Petrovske
	percent
Ukrainians	50.75%
Russians	46.21%
Tatars	1.71%
Belarusians	0.61%
Moldovans	0.15%

Native languages in Petrovske
	percent
Russian	76.4%
Ukrainian	22.4%
Belarusian	0.1%
others	1.1%
