= Bilorichenskyi =

Urban locality in Luhansk Oblast, Ukraine

Bilorichenskyi Білоріченський
- Rural settlement
- Location of Bilorichenskyi within Luhansk Oblast#Location of Bilorichenskyi within Ukraine Bilorichenskyi (Ukraine)
- Coordinates: 48°26′34″N 39°06′07″E
- Country: Ukraine
- Oblast: Luhansk Oblast
- Raion: Luhansk Raion
- Hromada: Lutuhyne urban hromada
- Elevation: 195 m (640 ft)

Population (2022)
  - Total: 3,110
- Time zone: UTC+2 (EET)
  - Summer (DST): UTC+3 (EEST)
- Postal code: 92016
- Area code: +380 6436

Bilorichenskyi (Ukrainian: Білоріченський) is a rural settlement in Lutuhyne urban hromada, Luhansk Raion, Luhansk Oblast (region), Ukraine. Population: 3,110 (2022 estimate)

== Demographics ==
Native language distribution as of the Ukrainian Census of 2001:

- Ukrainian: 24.81%
- Russian: 74.73%
- Others: 0.31%
