= Yuriy Solod =

Ukrainian businessman and politician

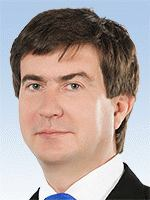

People's Deputy of Ukraine
- In office 27 November 2014 – 24 February 2023

Personal details
- Born: 27 April 1972 (age 54) Krasnyi Kut, Ukrainian SSR, Soviet Union
- Party: Opposition Bloc, Opposition Platform — For Life

Yuriy Vasylyovych Solod (Ukrainian: Юрій Васильович Солод; born 27 April 1972) is a Ukrainian businessman and politician.

Since the 1990s, Solod has been engaged in business ventures with his wife Natalia Korolevska.

In the 2014 Ukrainian parliamentary election, Solod was elected to the Ukrainian parliament for Opposition Bloc after winning a single-member district seat in Sloviansk with 34.17% of the votes. In the same election, Korolevska was also re-elected to parliament after placing 8th on the electoral list of Opposition Bloc.

In the 2019 Ukrainian parliamentary election, Solod was re-elected, this time as a candidate of the party Opposition Platform — For Life after winning the same single-member district seat. His spouse Korolevska was also re-elected, having been placed 4th on the party list of Opposition Platform — For Life.

He is reported to have left Ukraine in early February 2022.

In February 2023 Solod and his wife Korolevska asked for the deprivation of their parliamentary mandates for "health and family circumstance." On 24 February 2023 parliament withdrew their mandates.

Solod and his spouse have two sons.
