= Miusynsk =

City in Luhansk Oblast, Ukraine

Miusynsk Міусинськ (Ukrainian) Миусинск (Russian)
- City
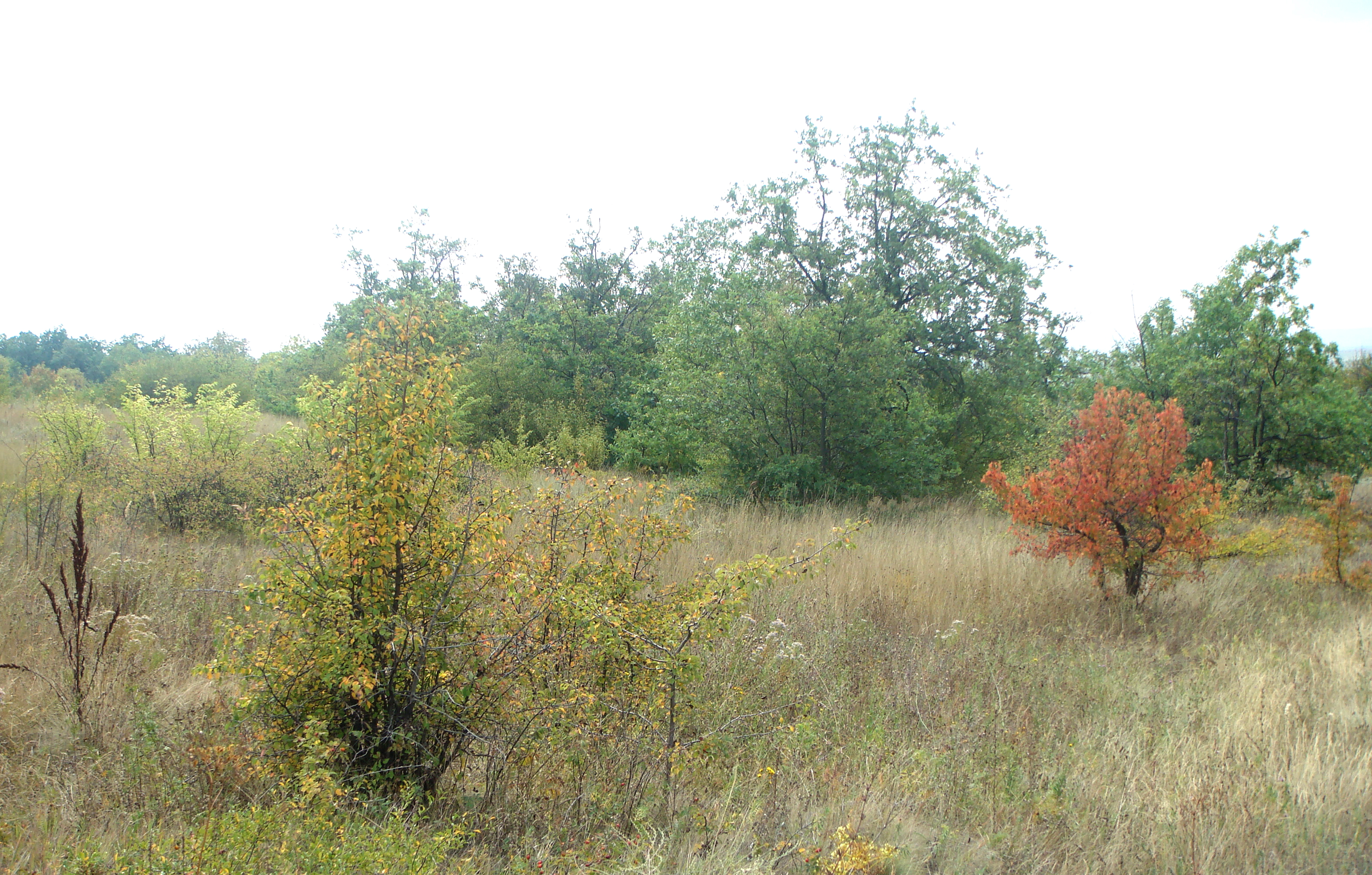
- Miusynsk nature reserve
- Interactive map of Miusynsk
- Location within Luhansk Oblast Location within Ukraine
- Coordinates: 48°4′32″N 38°53′6″E
- Country: Ukraine
- Oblast: Luhansk Oblast
- Raion: Rovenky Raion
- Hromada: Khrustalnyi urban hromada
- Shtergres: 1923

Population (2022)
  - Total: 4,596
- Climate: Dfa

Miusynsk (Ukrainian: Міусинськ; Russian: Миусинск) is a city in Khrustalnyi urban hromada, Rovenky Raion, Luhansk Oblast, in eastern Ukraine, currently occupied by Russia. Population: 4,596 (2022 estimate).

== History ==
The settlement was founded in 1923 under the name Shtergres (Russian: Штергрэс), where gres refers to the local thermal power station built as a part of GOELRO plan.

In 1938 Shtergres got the official status of an urban-type settlement.

In 1965, the urban-type settlement of Shtergres and the village of Novopavlovka were merged, and the city of Miusynsk was established.

Starting mid-April 2014 Miusynsk was controlled by the Luhansk People's Republic and not by Ukrainian authorities.

== Demographics ==
Ethnic makeup of the population:

Ethnic groups in Miusynsk
	percent
Ukrainians	72.43%
Russians	25.17%
Belarusians	0.61%
Armenians	0.55%
Tatars	0.30%

Native language as of the Ukrainian Census of 2001:

Native languages in Miusynsk
	percent
Russian	56.95%
Ukrainian	42.30%
Armenian	0.41%
Belarusian	0.08%
