= Heorhiivka, Luhansk Oblast =

Urban locality in Luhansk Oblast, Ukraine

Heorhiivka Георгіївка
- Rural settlement
- Location of Heorhiivka within Luhansk Oblast#Location of Heorhiivka within Ukraine Heorhiivka (Ukraine)
- Coordinates: 48°25′40″N 39°16′30″E
- Country: Ukraine
- Oblast: Luhansk Oblast
- Raion: Luhansk Raion
- Hromada: Lutuhyne urban hromada
- Founded: 1755
- Elevation: 65 m (213 ft)

Population (2022)
  - Total: 6,287
- Time zone: UTC+2 (EET)
  - Summer (DST): UTC+3 (EEST)
- Postal code: 92024
- Area code: +380 6436

Heorhiivka (Ukrainian: Георгіївка) is a rural settlement in Lutuhyne urban hromada, Luhansk Raion, Luhansk Oblast (region), Ukraine. Population: 6,287 (2022 estimate)

== Demographics ==
Native language distribution as of the Ukrainian Census of 2001:

- Ukrainian: 69.00%
- Russian: 29.19%
- Romanian 1.41%
- Others: 0.13%
