= Tytarenkove =

Urban locality in Luhansk Oblast, Ukraine

Tytarenkove Титаренкове
- Rural settlement
- Location of Tytarenkove within Luhansk Oblast#Location of Tytarenkove within Ukraine Tytarenkove (Ukraine)
- Coordinates: 48°25′58″N 39°11′45″E
- Country: Ukraine
- Oblast: Luhansk Oblast
- Raion: Luhansk Raion
- Hromada: Lutuhyne urban hromada
- Elevation: 161 m (528 ft)

Population (2022)
  - Total: 1,091
- Time zone: UTC+2 (EET)
  - Summer (DST): UTC+3 (EEST)
- Postal code: 92026
- Area code: +380 6436

Tytarenkove (Ukrainian: Титаренкове) is a rural settlement in Lutuhyne urban hromada, Luhansk Raion, Luhansk Oblast (region), Ukraine. Population: 1,091 (2022 estimate)

== History ==
The village was founded in 1930 as the central manor of the Cheliuskintsi sovkhoz.

On August 8, 2014, Serhii Tytarenko, a junior sergeant of the 1st tank brigade, was killed in Chelyuskinka while performing a combat mission for the defense of the Luhansk region.

On April 10, 2024, the Committee of the Verkhovna Rada of Ukraine on the Organization of State Power, Local Self-Government, Regional Development and Urban Planning supported the renaming of the village Tytarenkove, in honor of Serhiy Tytarenko, a fallen soldier of the Ukrainian Armed Forces. The final renaming will take place only after a successful vote in the Verkhovna Rada, which took place on September 19, 2024 and came into effect on September 26.

== Demographics ==
Native language distribution as of the Ukrainian Census of 2001:

- Ukrainian: 33.23%
- Russian: 65.56%
- Others: 0.24%
