= Vakhrusheve =

City in Luhansk Oblast, Ukraine

Vakhrusheve Вахрушеве
- City
- Bokovo-Khrustalne
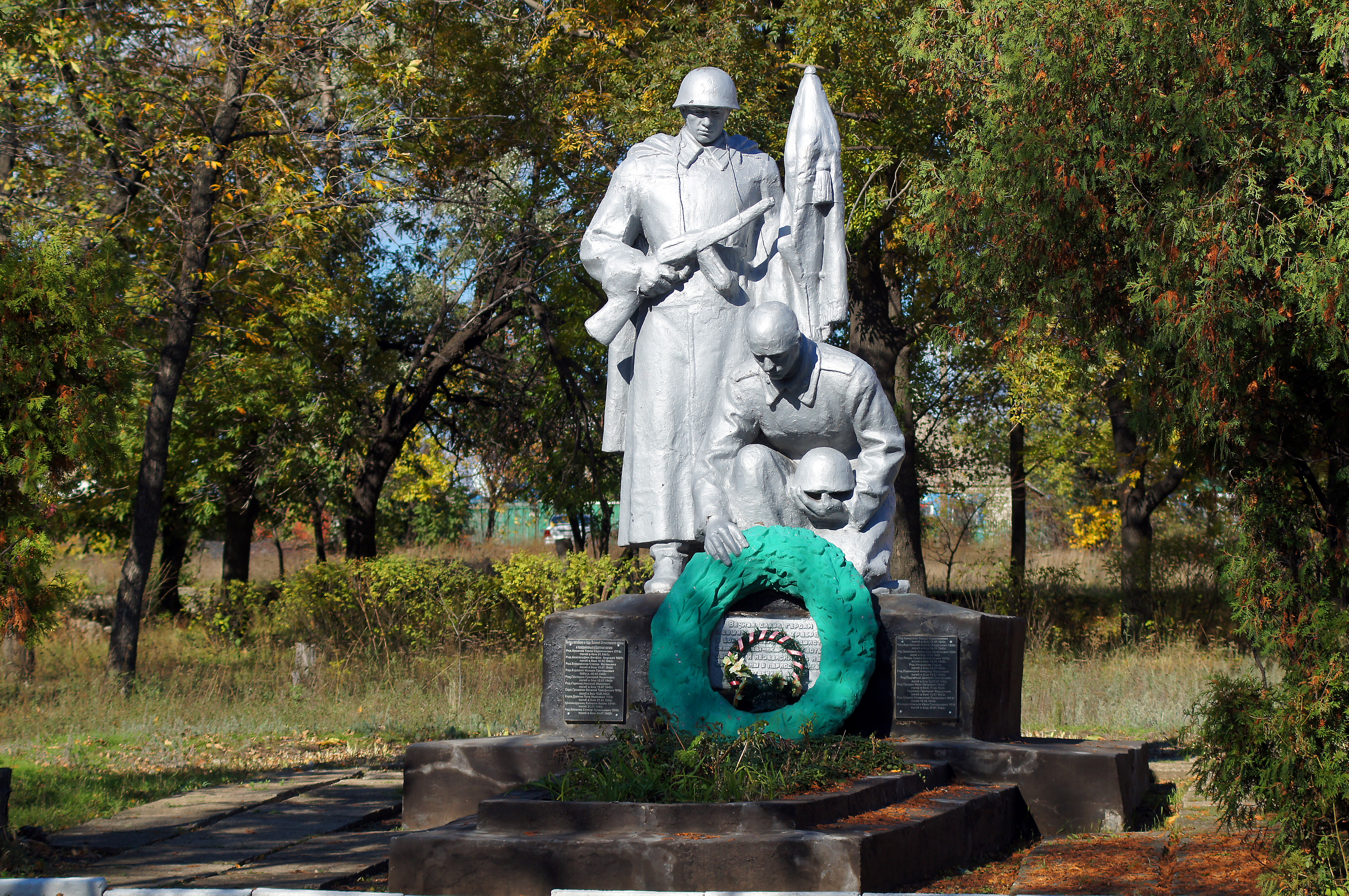
- Mass grave of Soviet soldiers
- Interactive map of Vakhrusheve
- Location within Ukraine Location within Luhansk Oblast
- Country: Ukraine
- Oblast: Luhansk Oblast
- Raion: Rovenky Raion
- Hromada: Khrustalnyi urban hromada

Population (2022)
  - Total: 11,421
- Area code: (+380)
- Vehicle registration: BB / 13
- Climate: Dfb

Vakhrusheve (Ukrainian: Вахрушеве; Russian: Вахрушево) or Bokovo-Khrustalne (Ukrainian: Боково-Хрустальне) is a city in Khrustalnyi urban hromada, Rovenky Raion, Luhansk Oblast (region) of Ukraine, currently occupied by Russia. Population: 11,421 (2022 estimate), 11,878 (2013 est.).

== History ==
Vakhrusheve is one of the youngest cities in Luhansk Oblast. The first settlements in the area around the modern city arose in the late 18th century, in the time of the Russian Empire. Some minor mines were built in the early 20th century, but more major development began in 1914. During World War II, the settlements that would later become Vakhrusheve were occupied by Nazi Germany, which tortured and murdered residents of the villages.

In 1954, several local villages were merged into an urban-type settlement named Vakhrusheve, after Soviet statesman Vasily Vakhrushev. Vakhrusheve received city status in 1963.

Since 2014, Vakhrusheve has been controlled by the Luhansk People's Republic and not by Ukrainian authorities. In 2016, it was renamed by the Verkhovna Rada to Bokovo-Khrustalne according to the law prohibiting the names of Communist origin.

== Demographics ==
As of the 2001 Ukrainian census, Bokovo-Khrustalne (formerly Vakhrusheve) counted a population of 14,770 inhabitants. The ethnic and linguistic composition of the population was as follows:

Ethnic groups in Bokovo-Khrustalne
	percent
Ukrainians	52.30%
Russians	40.69%
Belarusians	1.39%
Tatars	0.37%
Armenians	0.26%
Moldovans	0.23%
Poles	0.18%
Georgians	0.12%
others	4.46%

First languages in Bokovo-Khrustalne
	percent
Russian	82.6%
Ukrainian	13.2%
Belarusian	0.1%
Romanian	0.1%
others	4.0%
