= Antratsyt =

City in Luhansk Oblast, Ukraine

Antratsyt Антрацит
- City
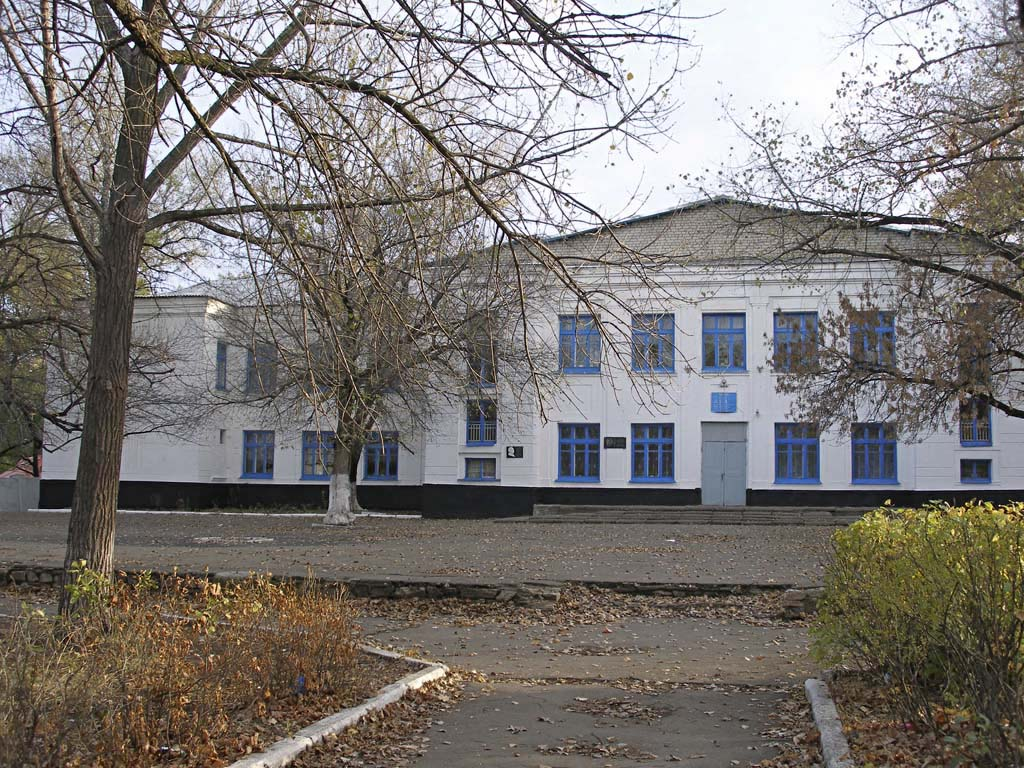
- School No. 1

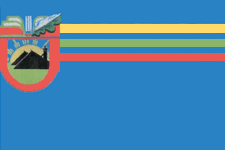
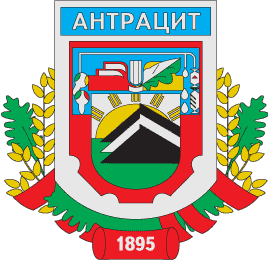
- Flag Coat of arms
- Interactive map of Antratsyt
- Location within Luhansk Oblast Location within Ukraine
- Coordinates: 48°7′9″N 39°5′24″E
- Country: Ukraine
- Oblast: Luhansk Oblast
- Raion: Rovenky Raion
- Hromada: Antratsyt urban hromada
- Founded: 1895 (miners' settlement)

Government
  - Type: Mayor-Council
  - Mayor: Vyacheslav A. Salyta

Area
  - Total: 61.3 km^{2} (23.7 sq mi)

Population (2022)
  - Total: 52,150
  - Density: 904/km^{2} (2,340/sq mi)
- Time zone: UTC+2 (EET)
  - Summer (DST): UTC+3 (EEST)
- Postal code: 94613
- Climate: Dfb
- Website: official site

Antratsyt (Ukrainian and Russian: Антрацит) is a city in Rovenky Raion, Luhansk Oblast (region), Ukraine. Residence of Antratsyt urban hromada. Until 1962 it was known as Bokove-Antratsyt. (Note: Ukrainian: Бокове-Антрацит; Russian: Боково-Антрацит, romanized: Bokovo-Antratsit) Its population is approximately 52,150 (2022 estimate).

Since early 2014, Antratsyt has been under the occupation of the self-proclaimed Luhansk People's Republic until its illegal annexation into Russia in 2022.

== Name ==
The name 'Antratsyt' is derived from a word for smokeless anthracite coal.

== History ==
Evidence from archeological finds and burial mounds from as early as 30,000 BC indicates the Saltovo-Mayaki were Antratsyt's earliest ancestors. Since the Saltovo-Mayaki were nomadic, the area was left uninhabited and considered part of the Wild Fields.

In the mid-17th century, runaway serfs, Don Cossacks and Zaporizhian Cossacks began to settle in the area. The Cossacks protected the land from Tatar and Mongol raids, and founded farming settlements. In 1874, Cossack Ivan Dvuzhenov found coal nearby and by 1904, the Antratsyt Bokovsky Coal Mine was built. A small settlement grew around the mine and soon after, the Kolberg Coal Mine was built in 1912, allowing the settlement to grow and prosper.

During the Russian Civil War, the coal mines and accompanying settlements changed hands several times, before eventually being captured by the Bolsheviks, who founded the communist Soviet Union on much of the former territory of the Russian Empire. In 1920, the disparate villages and mines in the area were united into an urban-type settlement named Bokove-Antratsyt, which was assigned to the Ukrainian Soviet Socialist Republic.

Bokove-Antratsyt received city status on 28 October 1938. Its population in 1939 was 13,280 people. Also in 1938, it became the center of the newly formed Bokove-Antratsyt Raion. From 18 July 1942 to 19 February 1943, Bokove-Antratsyt was occupied by Nazi Germany. 7,100 people from the city were awarded military honors and of those awarded, five were given the title Hero of the Soviet Union.

In 1962, the city's name was shortened to Antratsyt, and it was made a city of regional significance; Antratsyt still served as the administrative center of the raion, but it was no longer a part of it, instead being subordinated directly to Luhansk Oblast. Bokove-Antratsyt Raion was also renamed Antratsyt Raion to match the new name of the city. It served as the centre of Antratsyt Municipality which included the settlements: Bokovo-Platov, Berhny Nagolchik, Dubovsky, Krepensky, Schetovo, Kamenny, and Shahta Tsentralnaya.

In 2014, Antratsyt was taken over by the Luhansk People's Republic (LPR), a separatist militant group that served as a proxy for the Russian Federation. In May 2014, the BBC reported that the city was turning into a "hub" for materiel and Cossack fighters brought in from neighboring Rostov Oblast in Russia. A local, speaking to the BBC, reported that "relentless" propaganda was instilling the idea in the population "that the Russians are coming to help the separatists fight Ukrainian 'fascists'". Major fighting had not taken place so far at the city, though there were reports of a few men being shot and killed at separatist-run checkpoints.

In July 2020, Antratsyt was incorporated into the newly created Rovenky Raion, although the pro-Russian occupation authorities do not recognize this new status. After the 2022 annexation referendums in Russian-occupied Ukraine, Russia has claimed the city as part of itself. On 14 October 2023, the General Staff of the Ukrainian army announced that they had destroyed large amounts of Russian material in a strike on Antrasyt.

== Demographics ==
Population history
Year	Pop.	±% p.a.
1939	13,280	—
1968	54,500	+4.99%
2000	94,600	+1.74%
2010	78,137	−1.89%

The 2001 Ukrainian Census reported that Antratsyt had a population of 78,137. The ethnic makeup was 50.5% Ukrainian, 47.5% Russian, 1% Tatar, and 1% Belarusian. 85.9% spoke Russian, 11.1% Ukrainian, 0.1% Romani, 0.1% Armenian and 0.1% Belarusian as their native language.

== Geography ==
Antratsyt is located 90 kilometres (56 mi) south of Luhansk and 130 kilometres (81 mi) northeast of Donetsk. Even though Antratsyt is rich in water resources, which include the Nagolna River and the Mius River as well as several artificial lakes, residents are only allowed running water between the times of 18:00 to 21:00.

=== Climate ===
Antratsyt's climate is moderate continental with hot summers and cold winters. July temperatures range from 21.8 °C to 35 °C while January temperatures range from −6 °C to −15 °C. Annual precipitation is 400–500 mm.

== Culture ==
=== Religion ===
Orthodox Christianity is the predominant religion in Antratsyt with five churches (Holy Protection, St. Alexander Nevsky, St. George, St. Kazan, Mother of God "Skoroposlushnitsa" Nina Apostles Church). Other active religions include Jehovah Witnesses, Baptists, and Islam. The Church of Alexander Nevsky in the outskirt village Bokovo-Platov is considered an architectural monument as it was built in 1954 and survived damage when outlawed by the Soviets.

=== Sports ===
Healthy living is important to the people of Antratsyt. There are many sports teams, music bands, dance groups, and clubs held either in the sports complex "Swimming Pool" or the adjoining stadium.

== Education ==
There are many primary/secondary schools and preschools, including a specialized school of foreign languages.

Higher education institutions (level 5 accreditation):
- Antratsyt Mining and Transport Eastern National University (a branch of the Vladimir Dal East-Ukrainian National University in Luhansk)
- Antratsyt Department of Computer Software (a branch of the Kharkiv National University of Radio Electronics)
Vocational and technical schools (level 1 and 2 accreditation):
- Antratsyt College Radio Instrument
- Antratsyt Medical School
- Antratsyt Lyceum

== Economy ==
Located in Ukraine's heavily industrialized Donbas, Antratsyt's coal mining industry makes up 75% of the city's total production and comprises four mines (Partizanskaya Coal Mine, Komsomolskaya Coal Mine, Krepenskaya Coal Mine, "50 years of Soviet Ukraine" Coal Mine) and two mechanical repair plants (Luganskugleremont, Slavsant). The remaining economy consists of engineering companies (Ltd. "Pneumatics", AOZT "Prokat" AOOT "Color", JSC "Antratsyt Greenhouses", SE "Etalon-thermal") and food manufacturing companies (Branch LLC "Caravan" bakery, CE "Temp Ltd").

In September 2011, the Krepenskaya Coal Mine was permanently closed.

== Transportation ==
Marshrutkas (private minibuses) and trolley buses have provided public transportation and taxis are available as well. There is also a railway station that is part of the Karahash Donetsk Railway. However, the trolleybus system is currently out of operation, and only three out of service LAZ-52522 trolleybuses remain, whereas the rest have been withdrawn.

== Law and government ==
Antratsyt's government consists of a mayor and a city council with 46 members. Members of the city council are divided into six committees:

1. Rules and Deputy Ethics
2. Budget
3. Industry, Transportation, and Communications
4. Domestic, Housing, and Communal Services
5. Land Relations and Urban Planning
6. Education, Culture, Health and Sports

== Notable people ==
- Oleksandr Akymenko (born 1985), Ukrainian football player
- Ihor Korobchynskyi (born 1969), Ukrainian gymnast
- Alex Len (born 1993), Ukrainian basketball player
- Vladimir Lyakhov (1941-2018), Soviet-Ukrainian cosmonaut
- Volodymyr Prystyuk (born 1960), Ukrainian politician and former governor of the Luhansk Oblast
