= Rovenky Raion =

Subdivision of Luhansk Oblast, Ukraine

Coordinates: 48°00′N 39°09′E

Rovenky Raion Ровеньківський район
- Raion
- Interactive map of Rovenky Raion
- Country: Ukraine
- Oblast: Luhansk Oblast
- Established: 2020
- Admin. center: Rovenky
- Subdivisions: 3 hromadas

Area
  - Total: 2,088 km^{2} (806 sq mi)

Population (2022)
  - Total: 294,125
  - Density: 140.9/km^{2} (364.8/sq mi)

Rovenky Raion (Ukrainian: Ровеньківський район; Russian: Ровеньковский район) is a prospective raion (district) of Luhansk Oblast, Ukraine. It was formally created in July 2020 as part of the reform of administrative divisions of Ukraine. The center of the raion is in the town of Rovenky. Population: 294,125 (2022 estimate). The area of the raion is controlled by Russia, which continues to use the old, pre-2020 administrative divisions of Ukraine.

== Subdivisions ==
The raion contains three hromadas:

- Antratsyt urban hromada, centered in the city of Antratsyt;
- Khrustalnyi urban hromada, centered in the city of Khrustalnyi;
- Rovenky urban hromada, centered in the city of Rovenky.
