= Luhansk Oblast =

Administrative region of Ukraine

Luhansk Oblast Луганська область
- Oblast (Note: Annexed by Russia as Luhansk People's Republic)
- Flag Coat of arms
- Nicknames: Eastern gate of Ukraine, dawn of Ukraine, Луганщина (Luhanshchyna), Лугань (Luhan)
- Coordinates: 48.92°N 39.02°E
- Country: Ukraine
- Established: 3 June 1938
- Administrative center: Luhansk (de jure); Sievierodonetsk (de facto, 2014–2022)

Government
  - Governor: Oleksii Kharchenko (Note: Governor recognized by Ukraine. The Russian-annexed Luhansk People's Republic, which controls most of Luhansk Oblast, is headed by Leonid Pasechnik.)
  - Oblast council: 124 seats

Area
  - Total: 26,684 km^{2} (10,303 sq mi)

Population (2022)
  - Total: 2,102,921 ▼
  - Rank: Ranked 7th
  - Density: 78.808/km^{2} (204.11/sq mi)
- Time zone: UTC+2 (EET)
  - Summer (DST): UTC+3 (EEST)
- Postal code: 91–94
- Area code: +380-64
- ISO 3166 code: UA-09
- Vehicle registration: BB
- Raions: 18
- Cities (total): 37
  - Regional cities: 14
- Urban-type settlements: 109
- Villages: 792
- HDI (2022): 0.741 high
- FIPS 10-4: UP14
- NUTS statistical regions of Ukraine: UA22
- Website: loga.gov.ua

Luhansk Oblast (Ukrainian: Луганська область, romanized: Luhanska oblast; Russian: Луганская область, romanized: Luganskaya oblast), also referred to as Luhanshchyna (Луганщина), is the easternmost oblast (province) of Ukraine. Its administrative center is the city of Luhansk. The oblast was established in 1938 and bore the name Voroshilovgrad Oblast until 1958 and again from 1970 to 1991. Before the 2022 Russian invasion of Ukraine, its population was estimated at 2,102,921.

Important cities in Luhansk Oblast include Alchevsk, Antratsyt, Brianka, Kadiivka, Kirovsk, Krasnodon, Khrustalnyi, Luhansk, Lysychansk, Pervomaisk, Rovenky, Rubizhne, Sievierodonetsk and Sverdlovsk. All of the oblast is in the Donbas region.

In 2014, large parts of the oblast, including the capital Luhansk, came under the control of Russian-backed separatists who declared the Luhansk People's Republic, leading to a war against Ukrainian government forces. Since the 2022 Russian invasion of Ukraine, the oblast has come almost entirely under Russian occupation and has been the scene of heavy fighting, which continues in some places. In late September 2022, Russia declared the annexation of the entire oblast, along with three others, though the annexation remains internationally unrecognized. Russian-backed officials claimed in July 2025 that Russian forces had captured the last Ukrainian-held areas in Luhansk Oblast, bringing the entire region under their control. They made the same claim in April 2026, though Ukraine denied it.

== Geography ==
A topographic map of the oblast

Luhansk Oblast is in far eastern Ukraine. Its north–south length is 250 km, and east–west width 190 km. It covers an area of 26,700 km^{2}, 4.42% of the total area of Ukraine.

The oblast has the longest segment of Ukraine's international border with Russia among other regions (see State Border of Ukraine), consisting of 746 km (464 mi). The abutting Russian oblasts are Belgorod Oblast to the north, Voronezh Oblast to the northeast, Rostov Oblast to the east. Abutting Ukrainian oblasts are Kharkiv Oblast to the west, and Donetsk Oblast to the south.

The region is located in the valley of the Siversky Donets river, which flows west to east through the oblast and splits it approximately in half. The southern portion of the region is elevated by the Donetsk Ridge, which is close to the southern border. The highest point is Mohyla Mechetna (367 m (1,204 ft)), the highest point of Donetsk Ridge. The left bank of the Siversky Donets is part of the Starobilsk Plain. To the north this transforms into the Central Russian Upland.

== History ==
The territory was formerly part of the Wild Fields, and former administrative units in the territory of the current oblast included Sloboda Ukraine, Slavo-Serbia, Yekaterinoslav Governorate, Donets Governorate and Donetsk Oblast.

=== Soviet Ukraine (1938–1991) ===
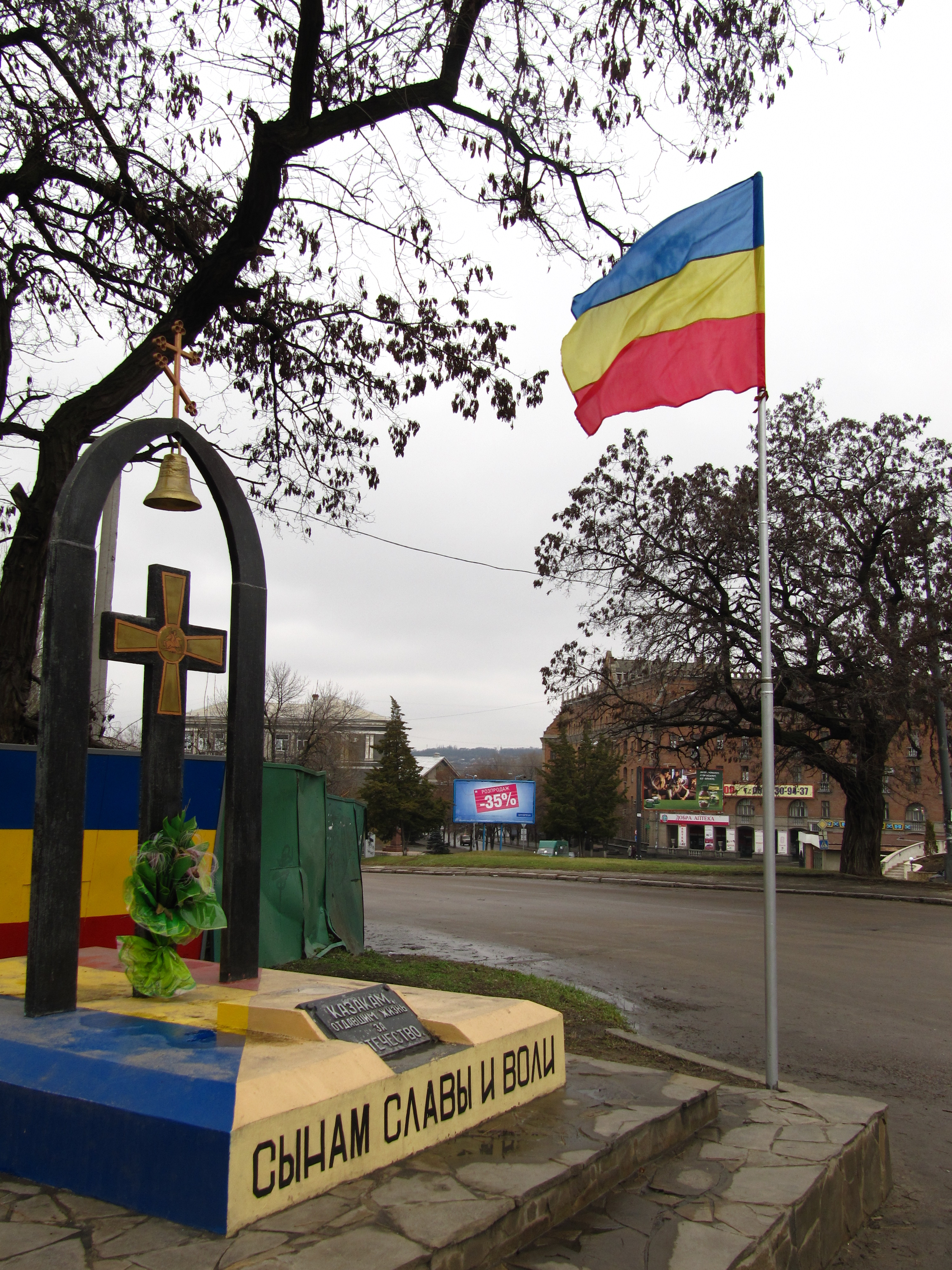
A monument to Don Cossacks in Luhansk. "To the sons of glory and freedom", 2012

The oblast originated in 1938 as Voroshylovhrad (Russian: Voroshilovgrad) Oblast (Ukrainian: Ворошиловградська область, romanized: Voroshylovhradska oblast) after the Donetsk Oblast was split between Voroshylovhrad and Stalino (today Donetsk Oblast) oblasts. Following the Soviet invasion of Poland, Starobilsk was the location of a prisoner of war camp for Poles, who were then massacred in the Katyn massacre in 1940. After the invasion by Nazi Germany in 1941, the region came under a German military administration, due to its proximity to frontlines. It was occupied at the end of 1942 as part of Case Blue German offensive directed towards Stalingrad.

Soon after the battle of Stalingrad, the Luhansk (at that time Voroshilovgrad in honor of Kliment Voroshilov) region again became the center of military operations during the Soviet counter-offensive operation Little Saturn in the spring of 1943. In the summer of 1943, the region was liberated from the Nazi Germany Armed Forces. During the Soviet era, the Oblast bore its current name between 1958 and 1970.

In the December 1991 referendum, 83.86% of votes in the oblast were in favor of the Declaration of Independence of Ukraine.

=== Independent Ukraine (1991–2014) ===
==== Pro-Russian insurgency (2014–2022) ====
On 8 April 2014, following the annexation of Crimea by Russia, pro-Russian separatists occupying the Luhansk Oblast administrative building planned to declare the independence of the region as the Luhansk Parliamentary Republic, after other pro-Russian separatists declared Donetsk People's Republic in the Donetsk Oblast (7 April 2014). When the Luhansk Parliamentary Republic ceased to exist, the separatists declared the Luhansk People's Republic on 27 April 2014. They held a disputed referendum on separating from Ukraine on 11 May 2014. The legitimacy of the referendums was not recognized by any government. Ukraine does not recognize the referendum, while the EU and US said the polls were illegal and fraudulent. Subsequently, the war in Donbas began.

As a result of the war in Donbas, Luhansk insurgents control the southern third of the oblast, which includes the city of Luhansk, the region's most populous city and the capital of the oblast. Due to this, most oblast government functions have moved to Sievierodonetsk, which forces of the Government of Ukraine recaptured in July 2014. Many universities located in the occupied areas have moved to government-controlled cities such as Sievierodonetsk, Starobilsk or Rubizhne. A survey conducted in December 2014 by the Kyiv International Institute of Sociology found that 5.7% of the oblast's population supported their region joining Russia, 84.1% did not support the idea, and the rest were undecided or did not respond. Insurgent-controlled areas were not polled.

==== Russian occupation (2022–present) ====
During the 2022 Russian invasion of Ukraine, Russian ground forces entered the occupied territory of Luhansk Oblast by crossing the Russian border on 22 February 2022. They invaded government-controlled territory across the line of contact and the Russian border on 24 February. As of 26 May 2022 they had occupied all but 5% of the region.

During the mid-2022 battle of Donbas, Russian troops attacked and eventually captured the cities of Sieverodonetsk and Lysychansk during May and June 2022 in two of the most significant and most intense battles of the Eastern Ukraine offensive. By 3 July 2022, Russian and allied troops controlled all cities in the oblast. On 4–5 July 2022, during the international Ukraine Recovery Conference (URC 2022) in Lugano, Finland, Sweden, and the Czech Republic pledged to support the postwar rebuilding of the Luhansk region. On 11 September 2022, there were unconfirmed reports that Bilohorivka near Lysychansk, was recaptured. On 19 September 2022, Ukrainian forces confirmed this.

In late September 2022, an annexation referendum was held in Luhansk on joining the Russian Federation, although Ukraine along with the United Nations and most observers declared the referendum to be illegitimate and fraudulent. Following the staged victory in the voting, the region and the so-called Luhansk People's Republic were absorbed into Russia. The United Nations General Assembly subsequently passed a resolution calling on countries not to recognise what it described as an "attempted illegal annexation" and demanded that Russia "immediately, completely and unconditionally withdraw".

As of 5 October 2022, nearly all of the oblast is occupied by Russia, which claims the oblast as the Luhansk People's Republic (LPR), a self-declared state turned Russian federal subject. The war in Donbas and the subsequent 2022 Russian invasion of Ukraine saw heavy fighting in the oblast, with Sievierodonetsk captured in June by Russian and LPR forces after an assault lasting several weeks, and the oblast's last major settlement under Ukrainian control, Lysychansk, captured by Russian and Russia-backed forces on 2 July. The next day, Russia's Minister of Defence announced that the entire territory of the oblast had been "liberated", but three weeks later the governor of the oblast reported heavy fighting was still ongoing. On 4 September, Ukrainian forces launched a counteroffensive in eastern Ukraine and recaptured small parts of Donetsk Oblast and, on 1 October, Lyman. Ukrainian forces also pushed through the stalemate at the Luhansk Oblast border and, most notably, recaptured Bilohirivka while engaging LPR forces in Lysychansk. Since then, there has been continued fighting in the western parts of the region in a renewed Luhansk Oblast campaign.

== Administrative subdivisions ==
Map	No.	Name in English	Name in Ukrainian	Romanization	Admin. centre
	1	Svatove Raion	Сватівський район	Svativskyi raion	Svatove
	2	Starobilsk Raion	Старобільський район	Starobilskyi raion	Starobilsk
	3	Sievierodonetsk Raion	Сєвєродонецький район	Sievierodonetskyi raion	Sievierodonetsk
	4	Shchastia Raion	Щастинський район	Shchastynskyi raion	Shchastia (de jure); Novoaidar (de facto)
	5	Alchevsk Raion	Алчевський район	Alchevskyi raion	Alchevsk
	6	Luhansk Raion	Луганський район	Luhanskyi raion	Luhansk
	7	Rovenky Raion	Ровеньківський район	Rovenkivskyi raion	Rovenky
	8	Dovzhansk Raion	Довжанський район	Dovzhanskyi raion	Dovzhansk (Sverdlovsk)

Like the other provinces of Ukraine, Luhansk Oblast has a double jurisdiction. The oblast is predominantly administrated by the Luhansk Oblast State Administration, headed by the governor of the oblast, who is appointed by the President of Ukraine. The province has a representative body, the provincial council, which is headed by its chairman and elected by popular vote.

The province is primarily divided into 18 raions (districts), and 37 cities, including 14 cities of regional significance. The administrative center is Luhansk. These raions are listed below with their areas and populations.

The province's secondary division consists of various municipalities. Those municipalities may consist of one or more populated places. The municipalities are administratively subordinate to the raion in which they are located, with the exception of 14 cities subordinated directly to the oblast. The city of Luhansk is subdivided into its own four city-districts (boroughs).

All subdivisions are governed by their respective councils (radas).

=== Cities ===
Largest cities or towns in Luhansk Oblast Source?
Rank	Name	Raion	Pop.
1	Luhansk	Luhansk	425,848
2	Alchevsk	Alchevsk	114,624
3	Sievierodonetsk	Sievierodonetsk	121,000
4	Lysychansk	Sievierodonetsk	103,459
5	Khrustalnyi	Rovenky	82,765
6	Kadiivka	Alchevsk	76,492
7	Sverdlovsk	Dovzhansk	64,503
8	Rubizhne	Sievierodonetsk	63,474
9	Antratsyt	Rovenky	54,640
10	Rovenky	Rovenky	47,852

== Demographics ==
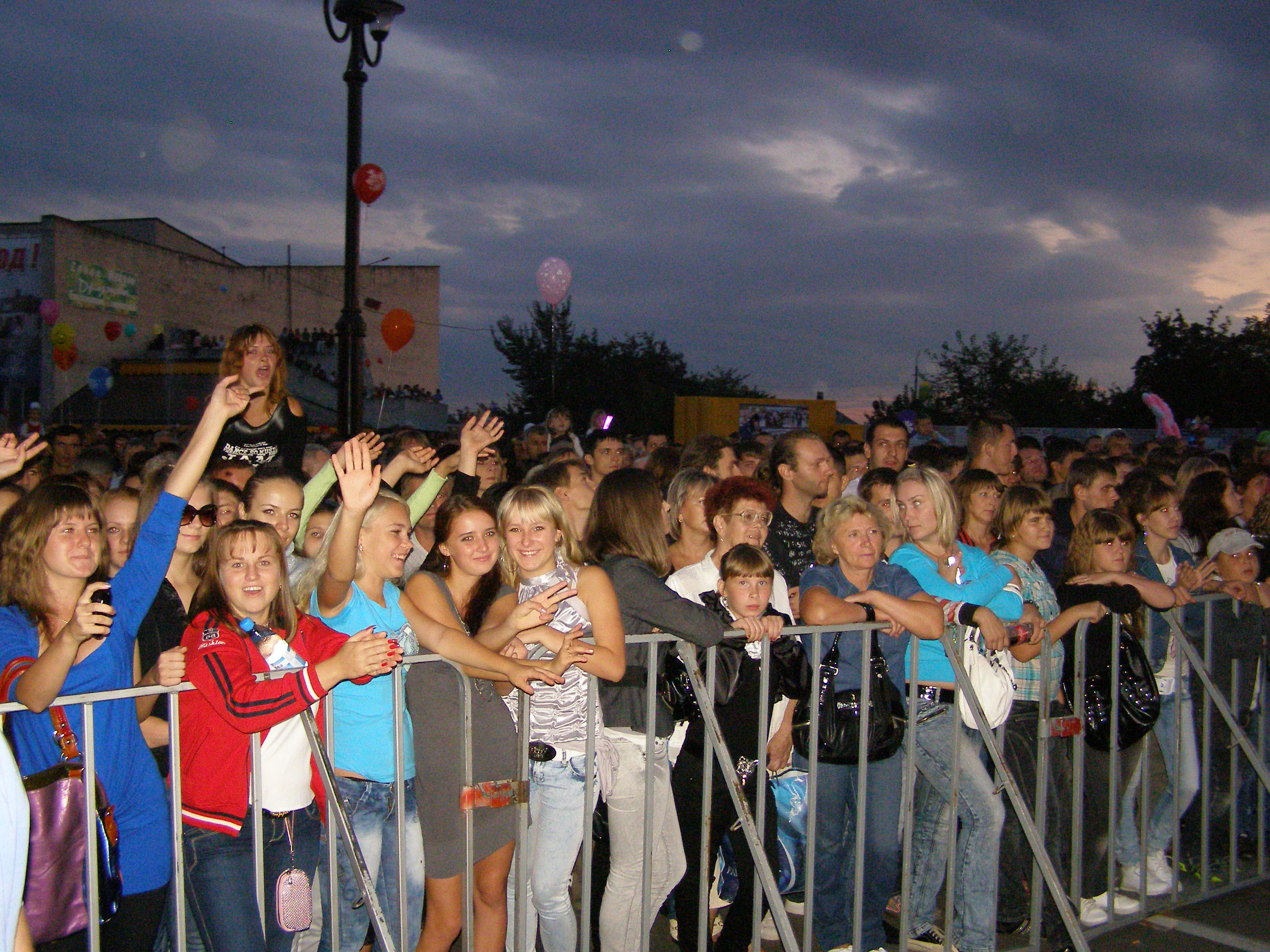
City Day in Lysychansk, 2010

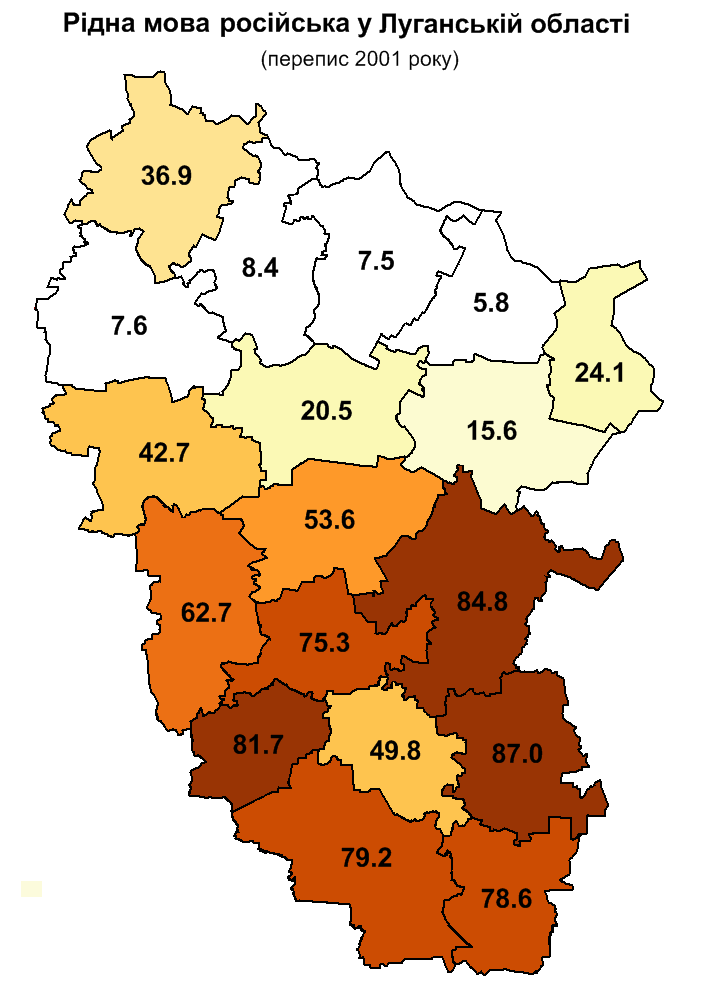
Map of Russian language speakers, 2001

Historical population
Year	Pop.	±%
1970	2,750,566	—
1979	2,786,697	+1.3%
1989	2,862,734	+2.7%
2001	2,546,178	−11.1%
2011	2,291,271	−10.0%
2022	2,102,921	−8.2%

Ethnic Ukrainians constitute a majority (58.0%) of the population. Among the minorities are native Russians (39.1%), Belarusians (0.8%), and others (1.4%). Ukrainians constitute the majority in all regions except for Stanytsia-Luhanska Raion and Krasnodon Raion, both of which are east of Luhansk. Ethnic Russians also constitute the majority in regionally significant cities, such as Krasnodon, Sverdlovsk, Khrustalnyi and Kadiivka.

In the 2001 Ukrainian Census, more than 68.8% of the population considered themselves Russian speakers, while 30.0% considered themselves Ukrainian speakers. The Russophone population predominates in the southern portion of the region and around the city of Luhansk, while the northern region is less populated, mostly agricultural and Ukrainophone.

Its population (as of 2004) of 2,461,506 constitutes 5.13% of the overall Ukrainian population. The Luhansk Oblast rates fifth in Ukraine by the number of its inhabitants, having an average population density of 90.28/km^{2}. About 87% of the population lives in urban areas, while the remaining 13% reside in agricultural areas.

Age structure

0–14 years: 12.3% ▲ (male 143,272/female 134,803)
15–64 years: 71.4% ▼ (male 768,544/female 838,639)
65 years and over: 16.3% (male 117,782/female 248,914) (2013 official)

Median age

total: 42.1 years ▲
male: 38.2 years ▲
female: 45.9 years ▲ (2013 official)

== Economy ==
Economically the region is connected with the Donets Basin.

Extractive industry

- Lysychansk Coal
- Luhansk Coal
- Sverdlov Anthracite
- Anthracite
- Pervomaisk Coal
- Rovenky Anthracite
- Donbas Anthracite

Machine building

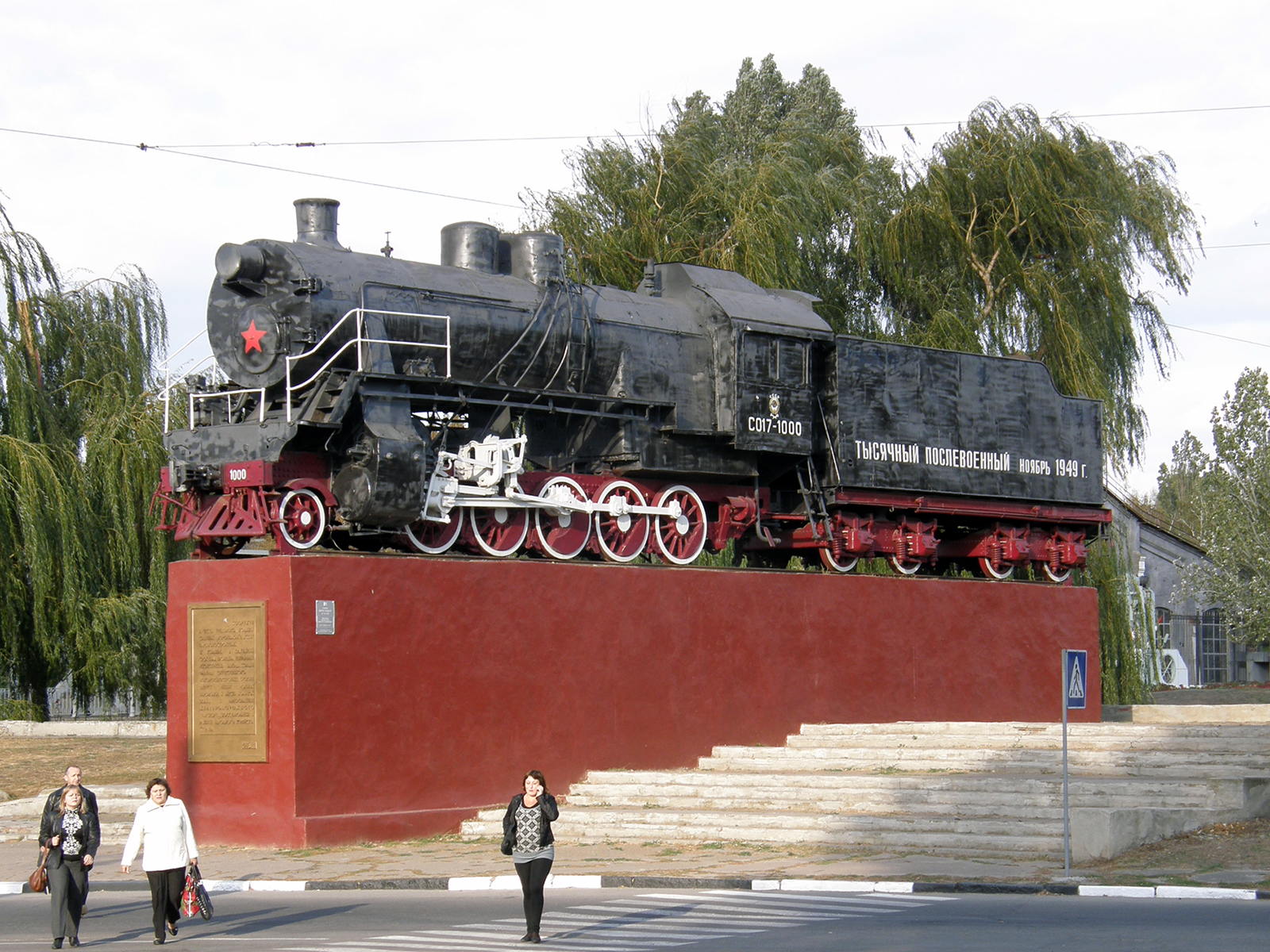
Luhanskteplovoz

- Luhanskteplovoz
- Khrustalnyi Machine building Factory
- Pervomaisk Power mechanical Factory
- Stakhanov Railcar Plant

Metallurgy

- Alchevsk Metallurgy Combine
- Alchevsk Coke-chemical Factory

Chemicals and oil refining

- Sievierodonetsk Association Azot
- Association Skloplastyk
- Lysynchansk Oil Refinery

Agriculture

The oblast has post industrial sites which run off building material into surrounding land. Yakymchuk 2018 finds feral stands of Triticum aestivum have colonised several of these sites.

- Derkul Horse Factory

Power generation

- Sievierodonetsk Power Station
- Luhansk power station
- Shteriv power station (decommissioned in 1983)

== Transport ==
Through the region pass two major European routes E50 and E40. There are 24 Russo-Ukrainian international border checkpoints of various entry.

- E50 within the Luhansk Oblast uses highway M 03 that starts from Debaltseve (Donetsk Oblast), passes through the city of Khrustalnyi, and enters the Russian Federation at the border checkpoint "Dovzhansky" (settlement Dovzhanske, town of Biryukove).
- E40 within the Luhansk Oblast uses highway M 04 that starts from Debaltseve (Donetsk Oblast), passes through the city of Luhansk, and enters the Russian Federation at the border checkpoint "Izvaryne" (town of Izvaryne).
- There is also another highway H 21 that runs from north to south and connects Starobilsk, Luhansk, and Khrustalnyi with Donetsk.

Rail transportation was administered by the Donetsk Railway until the Russian takeover.

There is also its regional airport Luhansk International Airport with its own carrier.

== Education ==
- East Ukrainian National University
- University of Luhansk
- Donbas State Technical University

Specialized

- Luhansk State Medical University
- Luhansk National Agrarian University
- Luhansk State University of Internal Affairs

== Points of interest ==
The following sites were nominated for the Seven Wonders of Ukraine.

- The house of Dal's birth (Luhansk)
- Fighters for the Revolution monument
- Derkul Stud Farm
- Royal Rocks (Luhansk State Preserve)
- Chasm Steppe (Sverdlovsk Raion)
- Ram Foreheads (limestone rocks)
- Mścichowski Palace

== Notable people ==
- Oleksiy Danilov (born 1962), Ukrainian politician
- Dov Markus (born 1946), Israeli-American soccer player, born in Ukraine.
- Serhiy Zhadan (born 1974), writer.

== Gallery ==
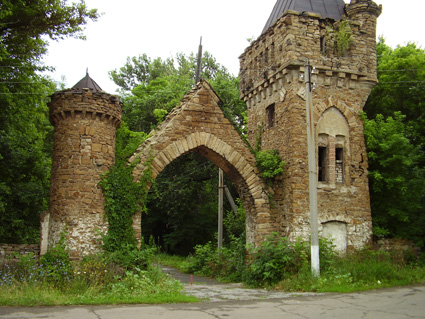
Mścichowski Palace, Seleznivka

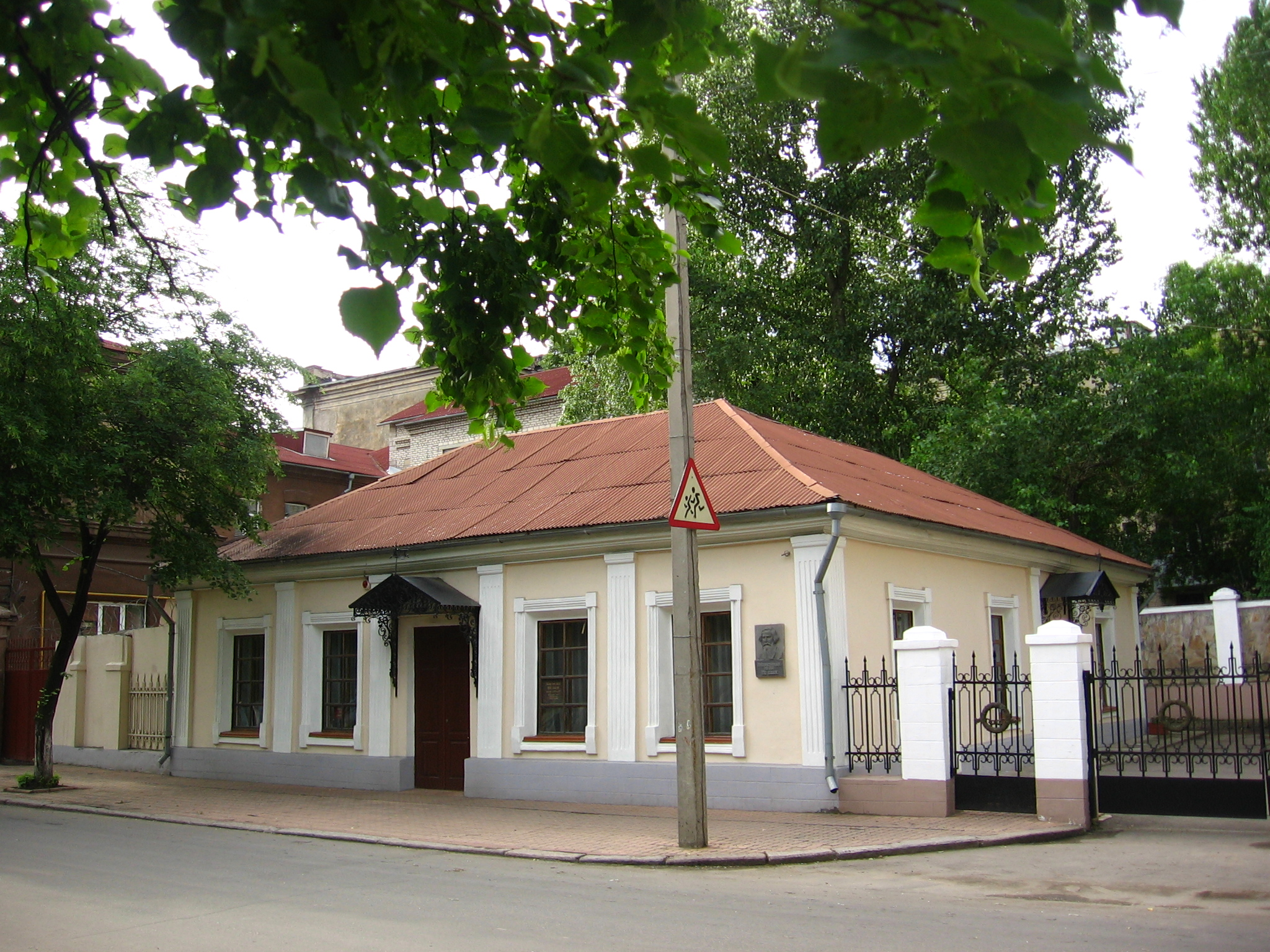
Dal's house in Luhansk

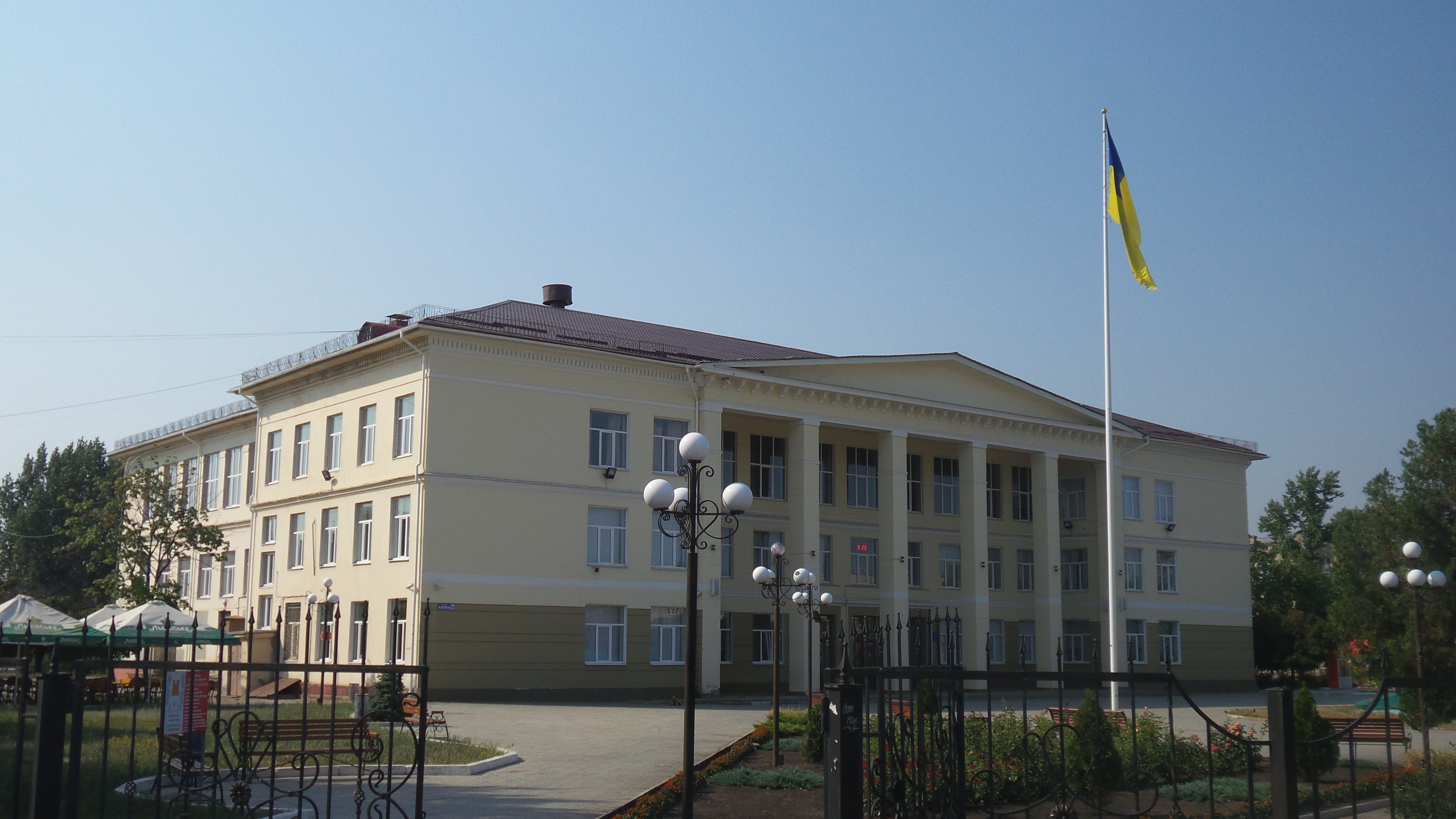
Palace of Culture, Sievierodonetsk

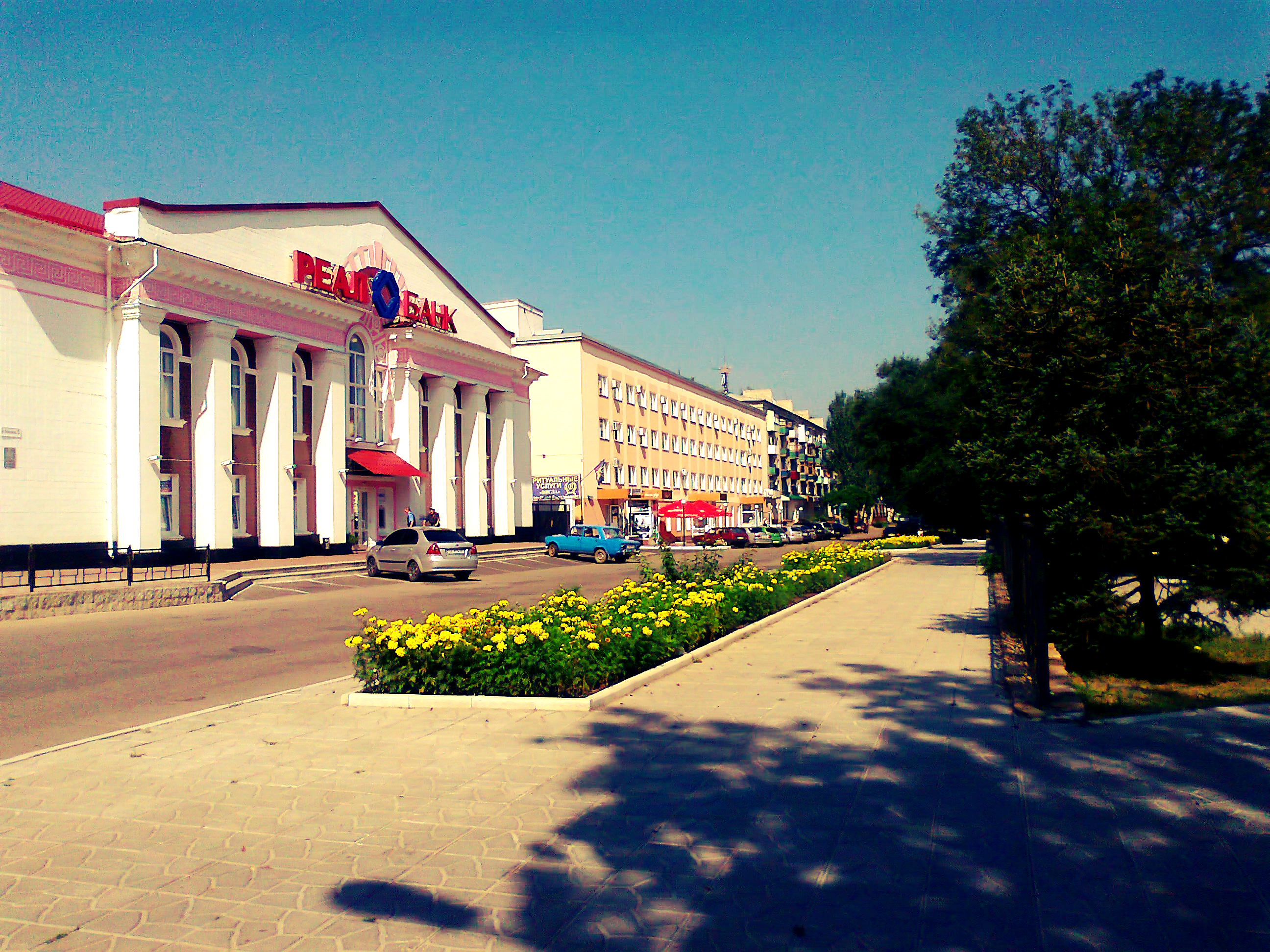
Dovzhenka Street, Lysychansk

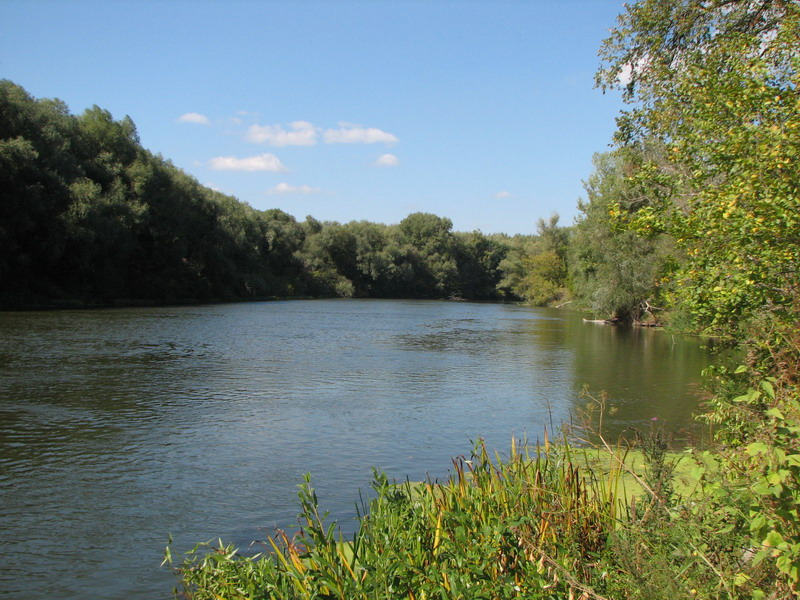
Siverskyi Donets near Shepilivka

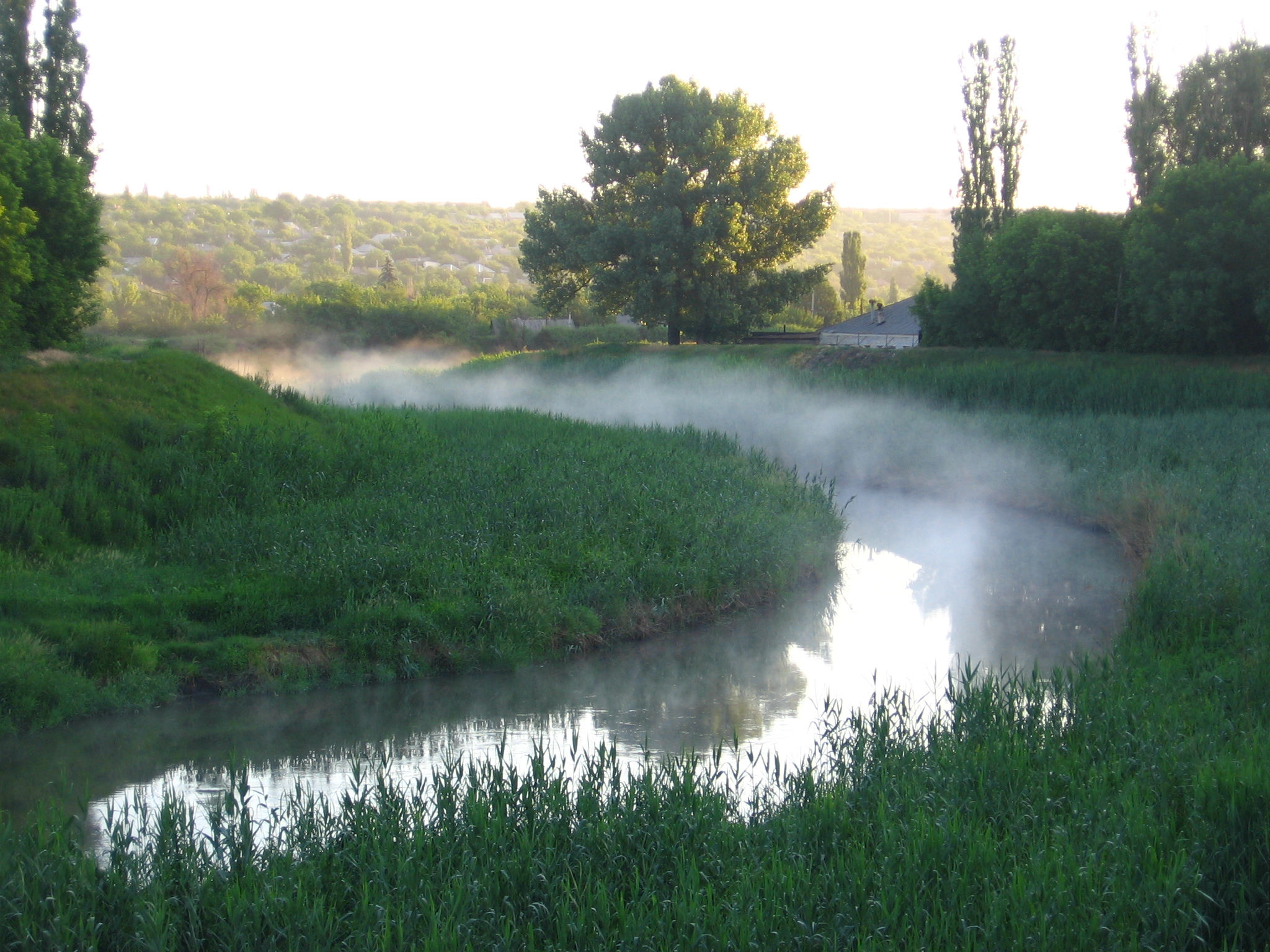
Mist over the Luhanka River

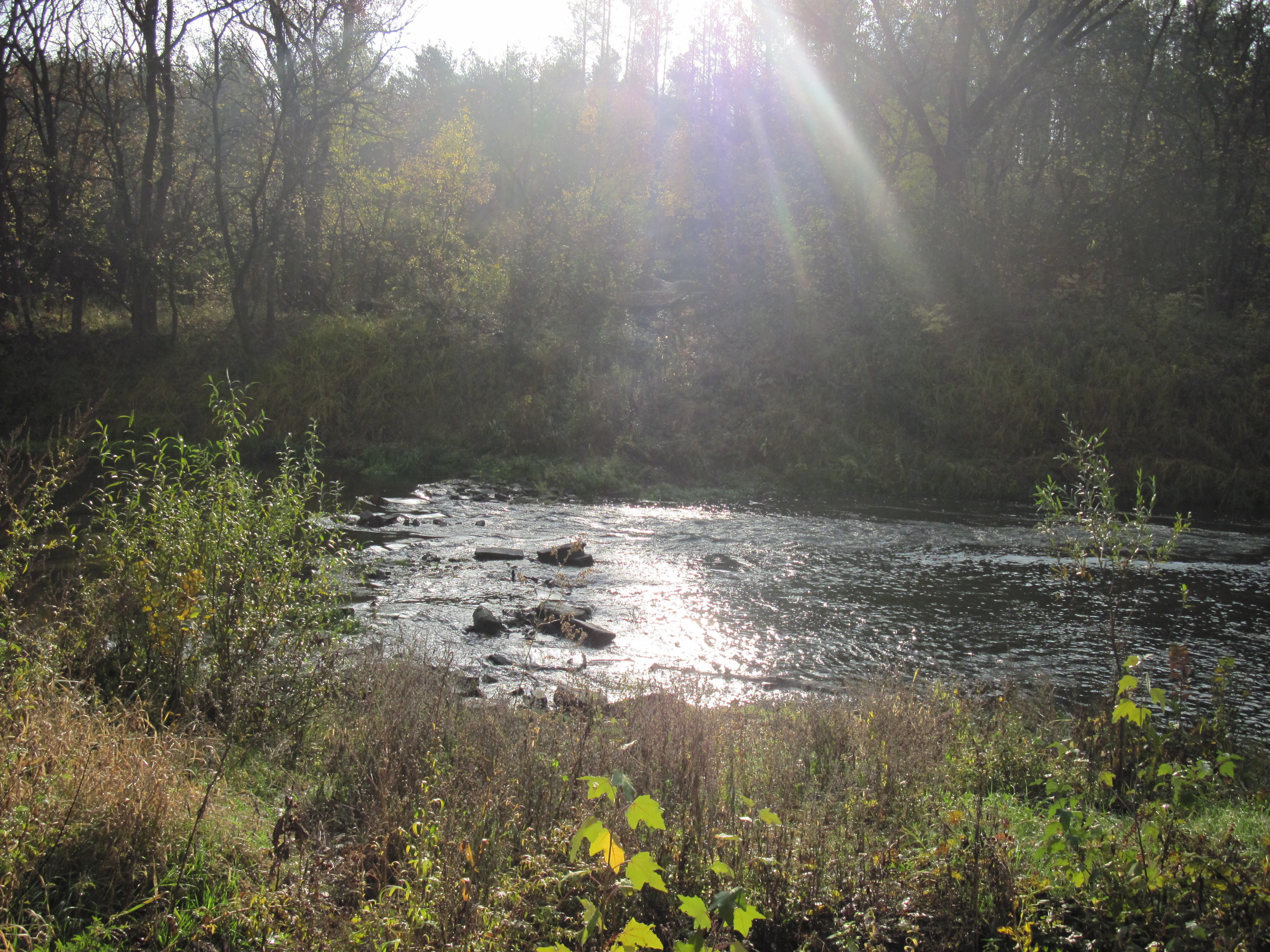
Landscape in the Derkulskyi

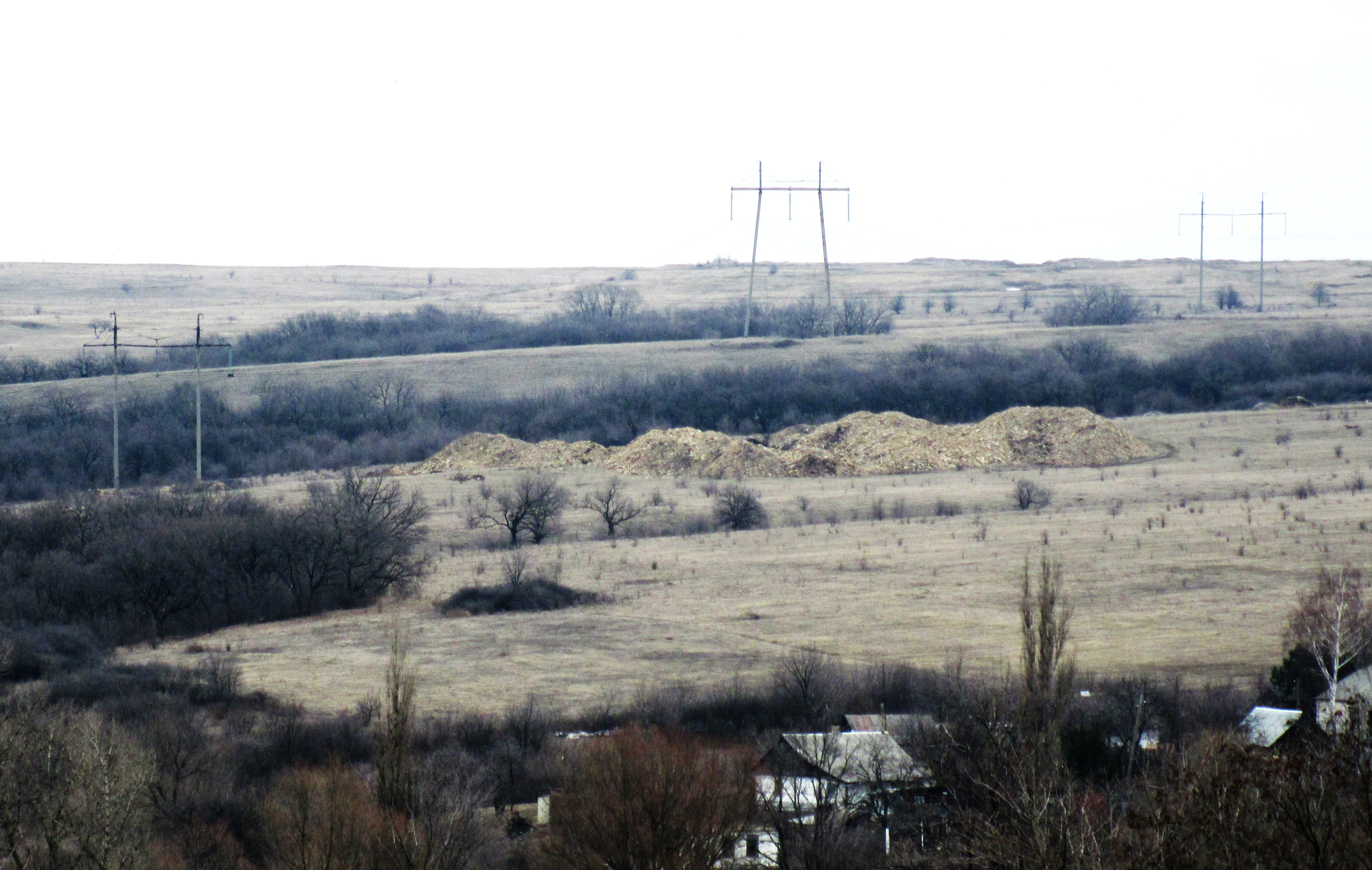
Perevalsk General Zoological Reserve

== See also ==
- 2014 Donbas status referendums
