= Fights on the Ukrainian–Russian border (2014) =

Battle on the border
- Part of the war in Donbas
- Territory controlled by Ukraine (blue) and Russian-backed forces (red) during the battles
Date	12 June – 7 August 2014 (1 month, 3 weeks and 5 days)
Location	Donetsk region, Luhansk region
Result	Russian victory
Territorial changes	Ukrainian withdrawal from Sector D DPR and LPR gain control over the Russian-Ukrainian border

Belligerents
Ukraine	Russia; Donetsk PR; Luhansk PR

Commanders and leaders
ATO Commander: Viktor Muzhenko; Chief of staff of the Anti-Terrorist Operation: Viktor Nazarov Sector D Commander: Petro Lytvyn (from 23 July) Andriy Hryshchenko (until 23 July) Yurii Sodol; Olexiy Shandar; Mykhailo Zabrodskyi; Mykola Lytvyn; Oleksander Binkovsky; Ihor Momot †; Serhiy Kryvonosov †; Mykhailo Drapatyi	Alexander Zakharchenko; Igor Girkin; Alexander Khodakovsky; Valery Bolotov

Fights on the Ukrainian–Russian border in 2014, also called the Operation to restore the state border, the Battle at the border, the Battle in sector D, the Izvarinsky Encirclement, and the Dovzhansky Encirclement, was a phase of the war in Donbas in which the Armed Forces of Ukraine fought Russian-backed separatist forces over control of areas of Donetsk and Luhansk oblasts.

Fighting broke out in Sector D of the anti-terrorist operation during the "operation to restore the state border" during June–August 2014. The main task of the Anti-Terrorist Operation Forces was to restore control over the section of the state border Izvaryne – Kumachove and to cut the routes for illegal armed groups.

Establishing border control was a key point in the peace plan of newly elected President Petro Poroshenko. The offensive of the anti-terrorist operation forces began on 12 June. During the confrontation, Ukrainian units came under artillery fire from the territory of the Russian Federation. During numerous battles, the Ukrainian military failed to regain control of the Izvaryne checkpoint. With the loss of control over the settlements of Stepanovka, Marynivka and the Marynivka checkpoint in mid-July, anti-terrorist operation forces east of the village of Marynivka found themselves in an actual environment of the main forces. The besieged units were unblocked and in fact the battle ended on 7 August with the release of the last units that performed the task of blocking the state border. The battle on the border was the first major defeat for the anti-terrorist operation forces. As a result, control over the state border from Izvaryny to Marynivka was lost. The Armed Forces, the National Guard and the State Border Guard Service of Ukraine have suffered heavy losses in both personnel and equipment. The Armed Forces of Ukraine suffered particularly heavy losses.

Fighting at the border significantly limited the ability to supply from Russia, and after capturing hundreds of kilometers of the state border, the ability to supply militants, equipment and ammunition from Russia was limited only by its own available resources. As the supply of militants came exclusively from Russia, border control was a key point of settlement and later became one of the foundations of the Minsk Protocol.

== Forces of the parties ==
=== Composition and number of ATO forces ===
From the Ukrainian side:

- Armed Forces of Ukraine
  - 72nd Mechanized Brigade: two battalion tactical groups
  - 79th Air Assault Brigade (without a consolidated machine-grenade launcher platoon): two battalion tactical groups
  - 24th Mechanized Brigade: second battalion tactical group
  - 55th Artillery Brigade: 2nd and 3rd Gaubic Artillery Batteries
- Main Department of Intelligence of the Ministry of Defense of Ukraine
  - 3rd separate special purpose: 1 Incomplete detachment.
- Tactical grouping "Border" (commander Major General Binkovsky O. A.):
  - 1 mouth of the National Guard (Southern Eat of the National Guard of Ukraine), Polk ZHN NGU "Herkard"
  - Several detachments of the State Border Guard Service of Ukraine are a total number of up to 1 battalion.

The total number is not established, but the media is called a figure of about 3-5 thousand Ukrainian servicemen more than 50 tanks, 200 armored personnel carriers, 30 mortars, up to 80 guns and reactive plants. According to Y. Tinchenko, allocated for the operation of the Armed Forces of the Armed Forces, 70-90% consisted of just called in the army.

He commanded the "D" sector, in the zone of the responsibility of which it was planned to conduct an operation, Colonel Andriy Gryshchenko, the commander of the 72nd Brigade, on 23 July he changed the Lieutenant General Peter Lytvyn, the commander of the 8th Army Corps.

=== Composition and number of militants and Russian armed forces ===
Accurate data on the number and weapons of militants and Russian forces at the time of the ATO's offensive. There are only fragmentary data on the total number of militants zone of ATO or individual detachments. 16 June, the Secretary of the National Security and Defense Council at a briefing said that in the Donetsk and Lugansk regions of the ATO forces to resist 15 000 – 20 000 militants. Half of them were citizens of Russia – Kadyrivka from Chechnya, Russian Special Forces, mercenaries. The other half was local, forcibly mobilized by terrorists. The mercenaries were well armed and had fighting experience. In the border areas of the Russian Federation near Lugansk and Donetsk regions, 16 thousand Russian military were concentrated.

Lugansk militants were more than 4,000 people armed with light rifle weapons and integrated into several groups, including:

- The group "Yugoslava" is more than 100 people, the place of dislocation is Lugansk.
- The group "Mozgovoy" – up to 200 people, the place of dislocation – at first, the recreation center "Yaseni" in the Sverdlovsky district of Lugansk region. As of 16 June, the group was divided into Lisichansk, Severodonetsk and Sverdlovsk.
- Gayde Group (subordinated to the cerebrospinal) – about 50 people, the place of the dislocation – Sverdlovsk.
- The group "Pasha Locator" is about 50 people, the place of dislocation – Stakhanov.
- Group "Lesesho", more than 50 people, dislocation place – Lugansk.
- Group "9 mouth", more than 30 people, the place of dislocation – the happiness of the Lugansk region.
- Group "BEMA" – more than 100 people, place of dislocation – Lugansk.
- Goncharov group – more than 50 people, dislocation place – Lugansk.
- Group "Pak" – more than 20 people, dislocation place – Severodonetsk.

== The situation in early summer ==
Incidents of violation of the state border began in the spring of 2014. In the beginning of April a group of mercenaries from the Russian Federation led by a citizen of the Russian Federation, a former employee of special services, Igor Girkin freely entered the territory of Ukraine and captured the city of Slovyansk. At the end of May, it became quite clear that the state border was not locked. From Russia, militant detachments, military equipment and supplies arrived in Donetsk and Luhansk oblasts without hindrance. The leadership of the border service reported full control over the state border. But the actual state of affairs was criticized by the leadership of the State Border Guard Service of Ukraine, in particular the head of the State Border Guard Service of Ukraine Mykola Lytvyn.

Then, on the night of 2–3 May 2014, two Ural trucks loaded with weapons drove into the yard of the Antratsyt District State Administration. The administration's premises were occupied by several dozen Don Cossacks, they did not let anyone into the yard, did not answer questions. The Russian flag and the flag of the Don Army were raised above the administration.

Another high-profile incident occurred on 13 May, when the wounded self-proclaimed Luhansk "governor" Valery Bolotov was able to leave Ukraine through the Dovzhansky checkpoint. Acting President of Ukraine and Speaker of the Verkhovna Rada Oleksandr Turchynov instructed the Prosecutor General's Office and the Security Service of Ukraine to explain the reasons for this withdrawal within three hours. On 17 May, border guards detained Valery Bolotov at the Dovzhansky checkpoint at 5:45 am, informed all law enforcement agencies, including representatives of the anti-terrorist operation, and waited for about two hours for help from security forces, but no one arrived. Clashes broke out between the militants and border guards, as a result of which Bolotov was repulsed by armed men.

On 19 May 2014, a group of pro-Russian militants (about 50 people) carried out an armed attack on a checkpoint of the Armed Forces of Ukraine near the town of Amvrosiyivka, Donetsk region, near the Uspenka border checkpoint. As a result of the confrontation, the militants were neutralized, and some of them were detained and prosecuted. On 27 May, an air strike destroyed a terrorist training camp at the Yaseni camp near Sverdlovsk. However, at the time of the attack, most of the terrorists had moved to Sverdlovsk.

On 1 June, head of the border service Mykola Lytvyn admitted that militants, including Russian citizens, were breaking through the state border every day. They tried to block the border guards. The SBGS moved from guarding to defending the border. On 30 May, a column of militants was stopped and five militants were killed. Since the beginning of March, more than 250 Russian citizens have been detained trying to travel to Ukraine for sabotage. In early June, there were a number of armed clashes between the State Border Guard Service of Ukraine and militants seeking to establish their control over the border.

On 28 May, the airspace of Ukraine was violated by the Russian Federation, and the flight of a Russian UAV was recorded in the anti-terrorist operation zone. On 30 May, border guards in the direction of Novaya Nadezhda (Russia) – Dibrivka (Ukraine) detained armed individuals with a significant number of weapons while attempting to enter illegally. On 2 June, border guards were attacked. Fights with militants took place near Horodyshche and Amvrosiivka. On 3 June, after a two-day assault, the Luhansk border detachment was captured. The attack on the Luhansk border detachment was a planned action aimed at disorganizing the actions of border guards to protect the border with Russia. After the loss of control, the border guards were left without a coordinating and governing body. On the night of 3–4 June, and in the first half of 4 June, a special operation was conducted to relocate SBGS personnel in the Luhansk region. During the movement, on 3–4 June, a column of border guards was attacked, three assailants were killed and one car was destroyed. Personnel, weapons, ammunition, and equipment from the Stanychno-Luhanske, Krasnodon, Biryukovo, Sverdlovsk, and Dyakovo Luhansk Oblast Border Service were redeployed. Many weapons were left in Sverdlovsk. The SBGS stressed the need to involve the National Guard and the Armed Forces to defend the state border.

On 5 June, a battle took place for the Marynivka checkpoint, which was attacked by terrorists from the Vostok group. A convoy of militants, consisting of an armoured personnel carrier, four Kamaz trucks, three minibuses, and four cars invading from Russia, attacked the border checkpoint. Thanks to the reinforcements that arrived on time, the battle for the anti-terrorist operation forces was victorious. The militants retreated to Russian territory. During the battle, the armoured personnel carriers of the militants were captured.

During 4–5 June, there were attempts to oust border detachments from checkpoints, and on 5 June, according to a government decision, Ukraine closed 8 border checkpoints, which was officially reported to the Russian authorities: in Luhansk region – Chervonopartizansk, Dovzhansky, Chervona Mohyla, Novoborovtsi, Krasnodarskyi(checkpoint in the adjacent territory – Donetsk), Krasnodarskyi (checkpoint in the adjacent territory – Nizhny Shvyrev)," Northern "; in the Donetsk region – "Marynivka". Thus, about 100 km of the border was left unguarded. On 7 June, the Ministry of Foreign Affairs of Ukraine handed Russia a note of protest against violations of the regime at the border. The note listed the facts of violations and drew attention to the participation in the conflict of Russian paramilitary group – "Kazaki".

External videos
- Makiivka. Russian Tanks. 12.06.14

On 7 June, the militants issued an ultimatum to border guards at the Izvaryne checkpoint and demanded that they leave the checkpoint by evening.

External videos
- Russian tanks in Snizhne 12.06.14

On 8 June, militants attacked the Izvaryne checkpoint. Border guards successfully repulsed the attack. On 10 June, militants seized the Dovzhansky checkpoint. On 12 June, tanks were transferred to Ukraine from the Russian Federation, crossing the border at night, passing through Snizhne, Torez, and Makiivka, and entering Donetsk. In the evening of 12 June, Poroshenko held a meeting with the heads of law enforcement agencies on the invasion of tanks of the Russian Federation.

== Plan for future operations ==
The decision to conduct an operation to restore border control was made for both political and purely military reasons. Border control and the creation of a 10 km buffer zone was one of the key points of the peace plan proposed by newly elected President Petro Poroshenko. Later, Secretary of the National Security and Defense Council Andriy Parubiy said that the state border was closed in accordance with the task set by the President. Later in an interview, the former chief of staff of the anti-terrorist operation, General Viktor Nazarov, said that the corridor along the border of the anti-terrorist operation was punched to meet the requirements of the European community. This was one of the requirements for assistance to Ukraine. According to Nazarov, the Ukrainian military command was not very happy about this, because it understood that their men were in fact exposed to fire from two sides.

The initial task of the anti-terrorist operation group was to isolate the anti-terrorist operation area, regain control of the 140-kilometer section of Ukraine's state border with the Russian Federation on the Izvaryne-Kumachove section to prevent the groups of Russian mercenaries from crossing the border and eliminate militant and separatist lines, weapons and ammunition. In addition, the grouping of Sector "D" was entrusted with the task of ensuring the unimpeded transportation of ammunition and logistics between Petrovske – Stepanovka.

Border control was to make it impossible for the militants to use the five main routes through which the militant-controlled territories were connected with the Russian Federation, specifically the Uspenka, Marynivka, Dovzhansky, Chervonopartizansk and Izvaryne. Plans included creating fortified defense points, which could destroy the enemy moving through highways and steppe areas with artillery fire.

Moreover, after performing the first task (blocking the state border), the brigades of the Armed Forces had to move to the second – the encircling the megacities. Territorial defense battalions were to take their place. The operation was scheduled to begin on 17 May, but had to be postponed due to an attack on a 51st mechanized brigade checkpoint near Volnovakha, as a result of which the demoralized unit was temporarily withdrawn to the rear. In fact, the offensive did not begin until 12 June. This postponement allowed the militants to strengthen their positions in the border zone. On 5 June, militants from Donetsk and Shakhtarsk arrived in Amvrosiivka, numbering several hundred people with several armored personnel carriers and about ten trucks. On the same day, five trucks with Caucasian-looking militants arrived in Snizhne.

External videos
- Snizhne. Russian occupation of Ukraine continues. 8.06.14

On 7 June, a column of militants from Russia invaded Ukraine. Part of the column went to Torez and Snizhne. From Snizhne, the militants began to establish a stronghold and prepare for the siege. During 8 June, the militants continued fortification work in Snizhne: set up checkpoints, dug trenches, and equipped firing points. The columns brought reinforcements from Russia, including Russian military personnel.

External videos
- 1. 2014. ATO. Operation at the border // General Staff of the Armed Forces of Ukraine , 23 August 2017

In Snizhne on 10 June, the number of DPR militants, including militants of the Vostok group, increased. The strengthening of barricades and preparations for defense also continued. Dmytrivka was already under militant control. Snizhne would be a key settlements in future battles on the border, 15 km to the Ukrainian-Russian border and 12 km to the Savur-Mohyla hill – the highest point in the area. It would be difficult to keep Savur-Mohyla without control on Snizhne.

== Ukrainian breakout ==
In June 2014, battalions of the 72nd Separate Mechanized Brigade set out on a raid along the Russian-Ukrainian border, taking control of the areas around Amvrosiivka, Zelenopillia, Marynivka, Dovzhansky, Savur-Mohyla and Chervonopartyzansk. However, soon thereafter Ukrainian units in the area were subjected to cross-border shelling from Russia, with the Russian side using Grad and Uragan multiple launch rocket systems in support of the militants. This led to the establishment of the so-called "Izvaryne pocket. After concentrating in Zelenopillia, forces of the 72nd Brigade performed a breakthrough, which took place in the night of 6–7 August and resulted in 260 soldiers and 30 pieces of equipment breaking out of the encirclement. The brigade's 2nd battalion, commanded by Mykhailo Drapatyi, managed to cross over 40 kilometers from the area of Chervonopartyzansk, losing only one soldier killed in action. However, soldiers of the 72th Brigade's 1st battalion received from its commander an order to destroy their weapons and retreat to the Russian territory, where they were interned and later returned to Ukraine.

On 8 August, after crossing the Mius river between Antratsyt and Dmytrivka and breaking through enemy positions near Stepanivka, forces of the 79th Air Assault Brigade left the "D sector" with the support of the 30th and 95th Brigades.

== Participation of the Russian Federation in battles at the border ==
From 9 July to 5 September 2014, the State Border Service of Ukraine and the National Security and Defense Council reported more than 120 attacks of Russian artillery. Russian officials denied involvement.

In the morning of 11 July 2014, as a result of unexpected massive artillery attacks on military targets in the area of Zelenopillia, 30 were Ukrainian soldeirs were killed and more than 100 injured. During the next days after the attack, the units of the Ukraine's Border Guard Service were targeted by artillery fire. By the end of July 2014, the massive artillery fire led to significant losses and contributed to the consequent withdrawal of the Ukrainian forces.

== Aftermath ==
The successful withdrawal of parts of the 72th Brigade from encirclement at Izvaryne despite the lack of supplies, including fuel, allowed the unit to reorganize and continue to perform military missions. It also dispelled the image of Ukrainian soldiers as unwilling to serve their country, which had been spread by Russian propaganda. Mykhailo Drapatyi, who commanded the breakthrough of the 72nd Brigade's 2nd Battalion, would later distinguish himself during the 2022 Russian invasion of Ukraine, rising to the position of Commander-in-Chief of the Armed Forces of Ukraine in 2026.

== See also ==
- Outline of the Russo-Ukrainian War
