= Biriukove =

Biriukove Бірюкове
- Rural settlement
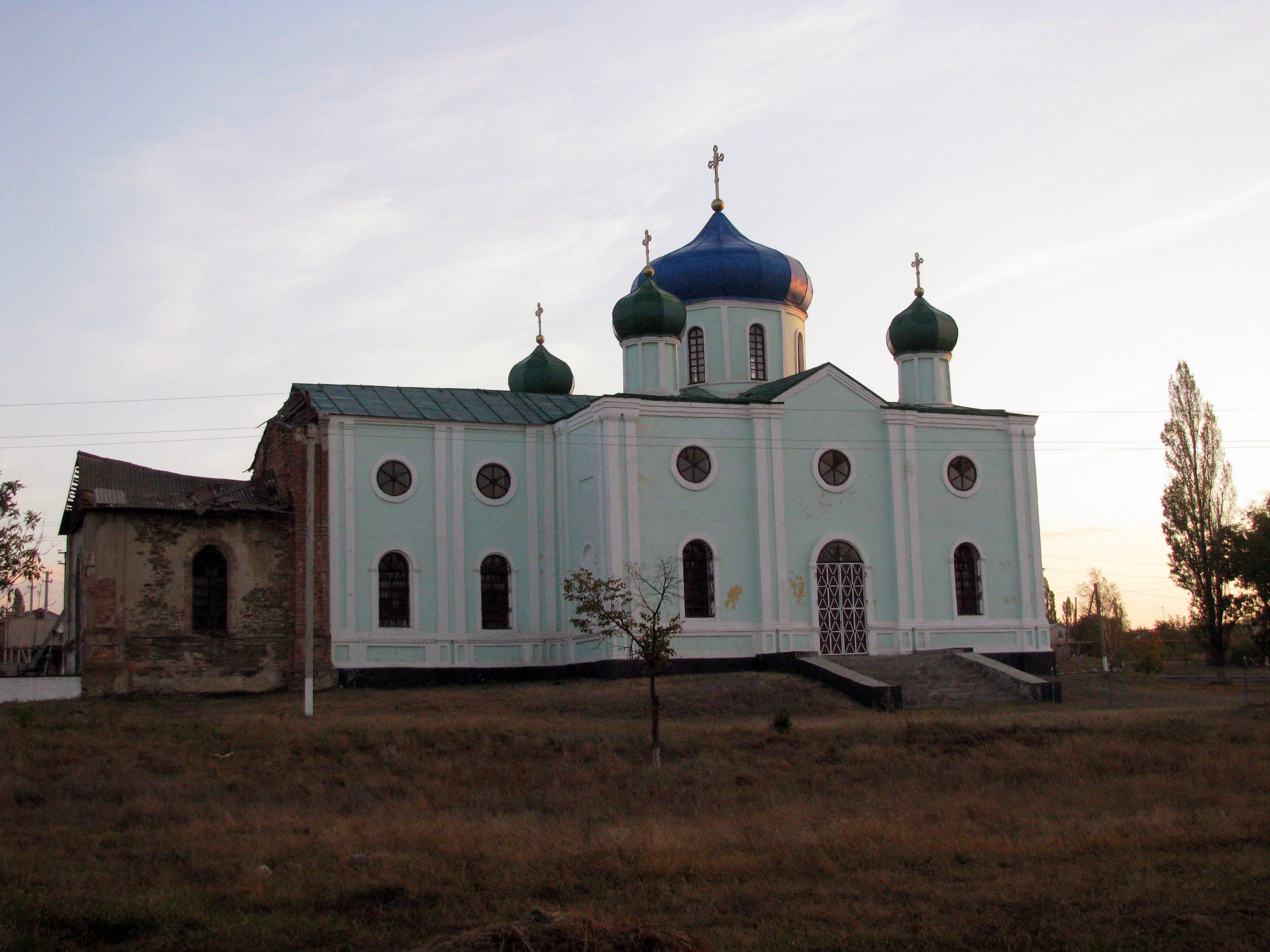
- Church of St. Mitrophan in Biriukove
- Interactive map of Biriukove
- Location within Luhansk Oblast Location within Ukraine
- Coordinates: 47°57′16″N 39°44′13″E
- Country: Ukraine
- Oblast: Luhansk Oblast
- Raion: Dovzhansk Raion
- Hromada: Dovzhansk urban hromada

Population
  - Estimate (2022): 3,951

Biriukove (Ukrainian: Бірюкове; Russian: Бирюково, romanized: Biryukovo) or Krynychne (Ukrainian: Криничне, Russian: Криничное, romanized: Krinichnoye) is a rural settlement in Dovzhansk urban hromada, Dovzhansk Raion (district) of Luhansk Oblast in Ukraine. Population: 3,951 (2022 estimate), 4,027 (2013 est.).

It is situated in 18 km from Sverdlovsk near the river Kundryuchya, a tributary of the Donets. The nearest railway station, Dolzhanskaya, is situated in 12 kilometres (7.5 mi) out of Biryukove. The nearby villages Bratske and Dovzhanske are subordinated to Biriukove, because it is a center of the village council.

== Geography ==
Biriukove is located on the left bank of the Kundryuchya river, near the source.

== History ==
Burial mounds dating back to the Bronze Age have been uncovered near Biriukove.

Biriukove was founded in 1778 by serfs from the villages Rovenky and Krasnovka, as the village Krynychne.

During the Russian Civil War, the Bolsheviks established control over Krynychne in December 1917, incorporating it into the Soviet Union. In March 1920, the Communist chairman of the village council, a man named M. Biriukov, was allegedly murdered by "kulaks". Krynychne was renamed to Biriukove in his honor in 1921.

About a thousand citizens of Biriukove were participants in World War II. About 340 of them died, while 780 were decorated with awards. A monument named "Motherland" was erected in honor of the soldiers who died.

In 1964, Biriukove received urban-type settlement status.

Since 2014, Biryukove has been occupied by the unrecognized state the Luhansk People's Republic. On July 7, 2014, one Ukrainian border guard was wounded after a mortar attack on this town's checkpoint, south of Sverdlovsk, Luhansk Oblast.

In 2016, the settlement was renamed by the Verkhovna Rada back to Krynychne as part of decommunization in Ukraine.

== Culture ==
There is a Church of St. Mitrophan in the town, which denominationally belongs to the Ukrainian Orthodox Church (Moscow Patriarchate).

== Demographics ==
Population history
Year	Pop.	±%
2001	4,414	—
2013	4,027	−8.8%
2022	3,951	−1.9%

As of the 2001 Ukrainian census, there were 4414 people in Biriukove, of whom 60% were Ukrainians, 39% were Russians, and 1% were of other ethnicities.

== Gallery ==
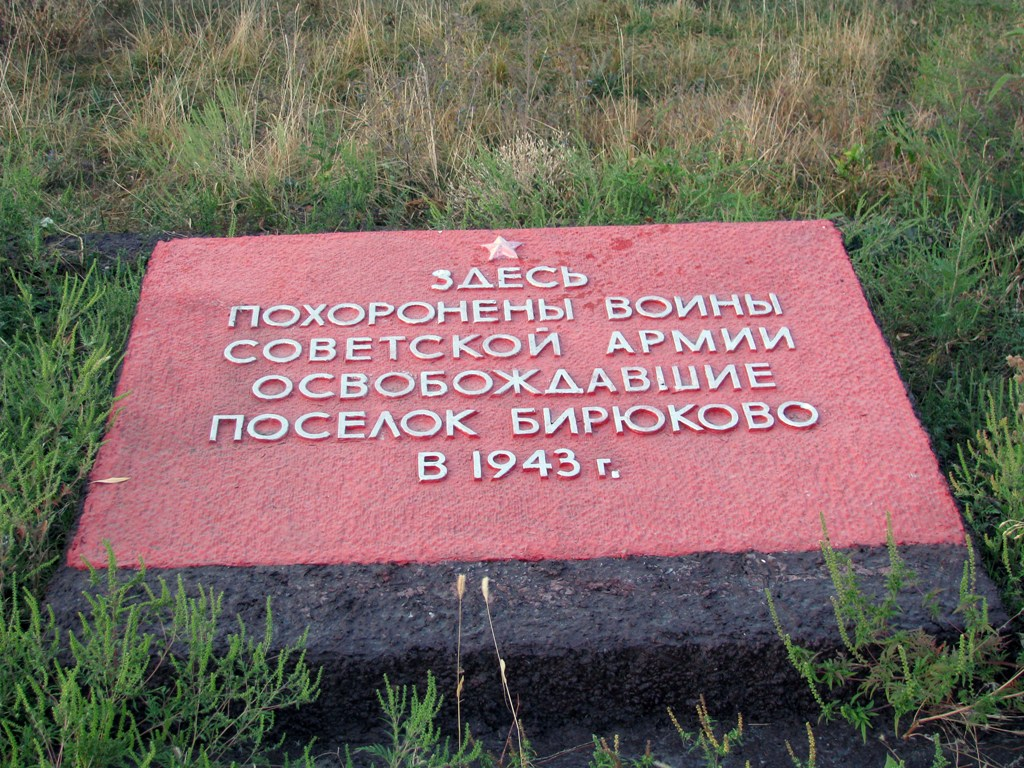
Commemorative plaque near the stele

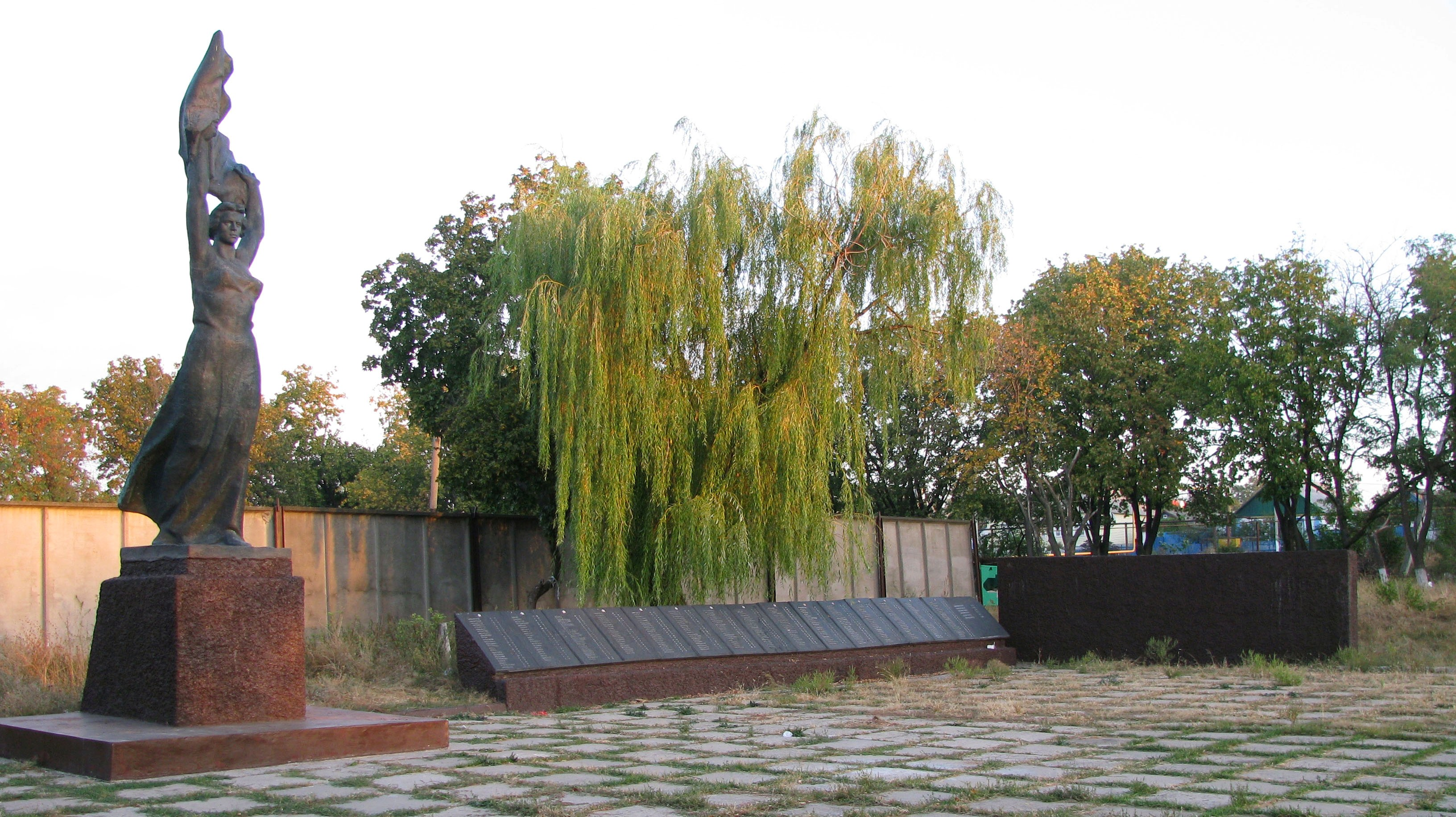
Stele in honor of participants of World War II
