= Kalininskyi =

Urban locality in Luhansk Oblast, Ukraine

Kalininskyi Калінінський
- Rural settlement
- Interactive map of Kalininskyi
- Location of Kalininskyi within Luhansk Oblast#Location of Kalininskyi within Ukraine Kalininskyi (Ukraine)
- Coordinates: 48°01′07″N 39°35′33″E
- Country: Ukraine
- Oblast: Luhansk Oblast
- Raion: Dovzhansk Raion
- Hromada: Dovzhansk urban hromada
- Founded: 1955
- Elevation: 276 m (906 ft)

Population (2022)
  - Total: 1,643
- Time zone: UTC+2 (EET)
  - Summer (DST): UTC+3 (EEST)
- Postal code: 92841
- Area code: +380 6434

Kalininskyi (Ukrainian: Калінінський; Russian: Калининский, romanized: Kalininsky), known officially as Kundriuche (Ukrainian: Кундрюче; Russian: Кундрючее, romanized: Kundryucheye) since 2016, is a rural settlement in Dovzhansk urban hromada, Dovzhansk Raion (district) of Luhansk Oblast in Ukraine. Population: 1,643 (2022 estimate)

== Geography ==
It is located 15 kilometres (9.3 mi) from Sverdlovsk, and 114 kilometres (71 mi) from Luhansk. It has an elevation of 276 metres (906 ft).

== History ==
Burial mounds from the 3rd century BC have been discovered at the site of the modern town.

The construction of Kalininskyi began in 1955 at the same time as the construction of the mines around it.

During the war in Donbas that began in 2014, Kalininskyi was taken over by forces loyal to the Luhansk People's Republic (LPR), a Russian puppet state. In 2016, the Ukrainian parliament issued a decree renaming the settlement to Kundriuche as part of wider efforts of decommunization in Ukraine. This name is derived from the Kundryuchya river.

== Demographics ==
Historical population
Year	Pop.	±% p.a.
1959	6,300	—
1970	2,700	−7.41%
1979	2,500	−0.85%
1999	2,300	−0.42%
2001	1,934	−8.30%
2022	1,643	−0.77%

As of 2001, it had a population of 1,934 people. By 2022, the estimated population had shrunk to 1,643.

Native language distribution as of the Ukrainian Census of 2001:

- Ukrainian: 25.89%
- Russian: 72.25%
- Others 1.86%
