= Oleksandr Koval =

Oleksandr Koval (Ukrainian: Олександр Коваль) may refer to:

- Oleksandr Koval (footballer), Ukrainian footballer
- Oleksandr Koval (politician), Ukrainian politician and Governor of Rivne Oblast
- Oleksandr Koval (businessman), Ukrainian politician, businessman, and member of the Verkhovna Rada

== See also ==
- Koval (surname)
