= Shakhtarske =

Shakhtarske is a toponym (place name) in Ukraine. It is a Ukrainian derivative of the shaft mining in an adjective form. It is often replaced by the Russian counterpart Shakhterskoye.

It may refer to:

== Cities ==
- Shakhtarske, Dnipropetrovsk Oblast, a city in Dnipropetrovsk Oblast (formerly Pershotravensk), an unofficial center of the Western Donbas

== Settlements ==
- Shakhtarske, Luhansk Oblast, a settlement in Luhansk Oblast (former urban-type settlement)
- Shakhtarske, Synelnykove Raion, a settlement in Dnipropetrovsk Oblast (former urban-type settlement)

== Villages ==
- Shakhtarske, Pavlohrad Raion, a village in Dnipropetrovsk Oblast
- Shakhtarske, Volnovakha Raion, a village in Donetsk Oblast
- Shakhtarske, Volodymyr Raion, a village in Volyn Oblast

== See also ==
- Shakhtarsk, a city in Donetsk Oblast
- Shakhterskoye, a village in Kazakhstan (formerly the Soviet farm "Shakhter")
