= Sievernyi =

Urban locality in Luhansk Oblast, Ukraine

Sievernyi Сєверний
- Rural settlement
- Location of Sievernyi within Luhansk Oblast Location of Sievernyi within Ukraine
- Coordinates: 48°21′24″N 39°55′21″E
- Country: Ukraine
- Oblast: Luhansk Oblast
- Raion: Dovzhansk Raion
- Hromada: Sorokyne urban hromada
- Founded: 1949
- Elevation: 121 m (397 ft)

Population (2022)
  - Total: 1,814
- Time zone: UTC+2 (EET)
  - Summer (DST): UTC+3 (EEST)
- Postal code: 94426
- Area code: +380 6435

Sievernyi (Ukrainian: Сєверний) is a rural settlement in the Sorokyne urban hromada, Dovzhansk Raion (district) of Luhansk Oblast in Ukraine. As of the 2022 estimation, the population of Sievernyi is 1,814.

== Demographics ==
Native language distribution as of the Ukrainian Census of 2001:

- Ukrainian: 8.14%
- Russian: 90.77%
- Others: 1.09%
