= Dubove, Luhansk Oblast =

Urban locality in Luhansk Oblast, Ukraine

Dubove Дубове
- Rural settlement
- Interactive map of Dubove
- Location of Komsomolskyi Dubove (Ukraine)
- Coordinates: 48°07′34″N 39°38′36″E
- Country: Ukraine
- Oblast: Luhansk Oblast
- Raion: Dovzhansk Raion
- Hromada: Dovzhansk urban hromada
- Founded: 1954
- Elevation: 274 m (899 ft)

Population (2022)
  - Total: 3,018
- Time zone: UTC+2 (EET)
  - Summer (DST): UTC+3 (EEST)
- Postal code: 92825
- Area code: +380 6434

Dubove (Ukrainian: Дубове), known as Komsomolskyi (Ukrainian: Комсомольський) till 2016, is a rural settlement in Dovzhansk urban hromada, Dovzhansk Raion (district) of Luhansk Oblast in Ukraine. Population: 3,018 (2022 estimate)

== Demographics ==
Native language distribution as of the Ukrainian Census of 2001:

- Ukrainian: 2.12%
- Russian: 97.59%
- Others 0.03%
