= Prykordonne, Luhansk Oblast =

Urban locality in Luhansk Oblast, Ukraine

Prykordonne Прикордонне
- Rural settlement
- Location of Krasnodarskyi within Luhansk Oblast Location of Krasnodarskyi within Ukraine
- Coordinates: 48°17′45″N 39°57′56″E
- Country: Ukraine
- Oblast: Luhansk Oblast
- Raion: Dovzhansk Raion
- Hromada: Sorokyne urban hromada
- Elevation: 49 m (161 ft)

Population (2022)
  - Total: 325
- Time zone: UTC+2 (EET)
  - Summer (DST): UTC+3 (EEST)
- Postal code: 94446
- Area code: +380 6435

Prykordonne (Ukrainian: Прикордонне), formerly known as Krasnodarskyi (Краснодарський) is a rural settlement in Sorokyne urban hromada, Dovzhansk Raion (district) of Luhansk Oblast in Ukraine. Population: 325 (2022 estimate)

On 19 September 2024, the Verkhovna Rada voted to rename Krasnodarskyi to Prykordonne.

== Demographics ==
Native language distribution as of the Ukrainian Census of 2001:

- Ukrainian: 1.21%
- Russian: 98.79%
