= Sukhodilsk =

City in Luhansk Oblast, Ukraine

Coordinates: 48.35°N 39.7167°E

Sukhodilsk Суходільськ
- City
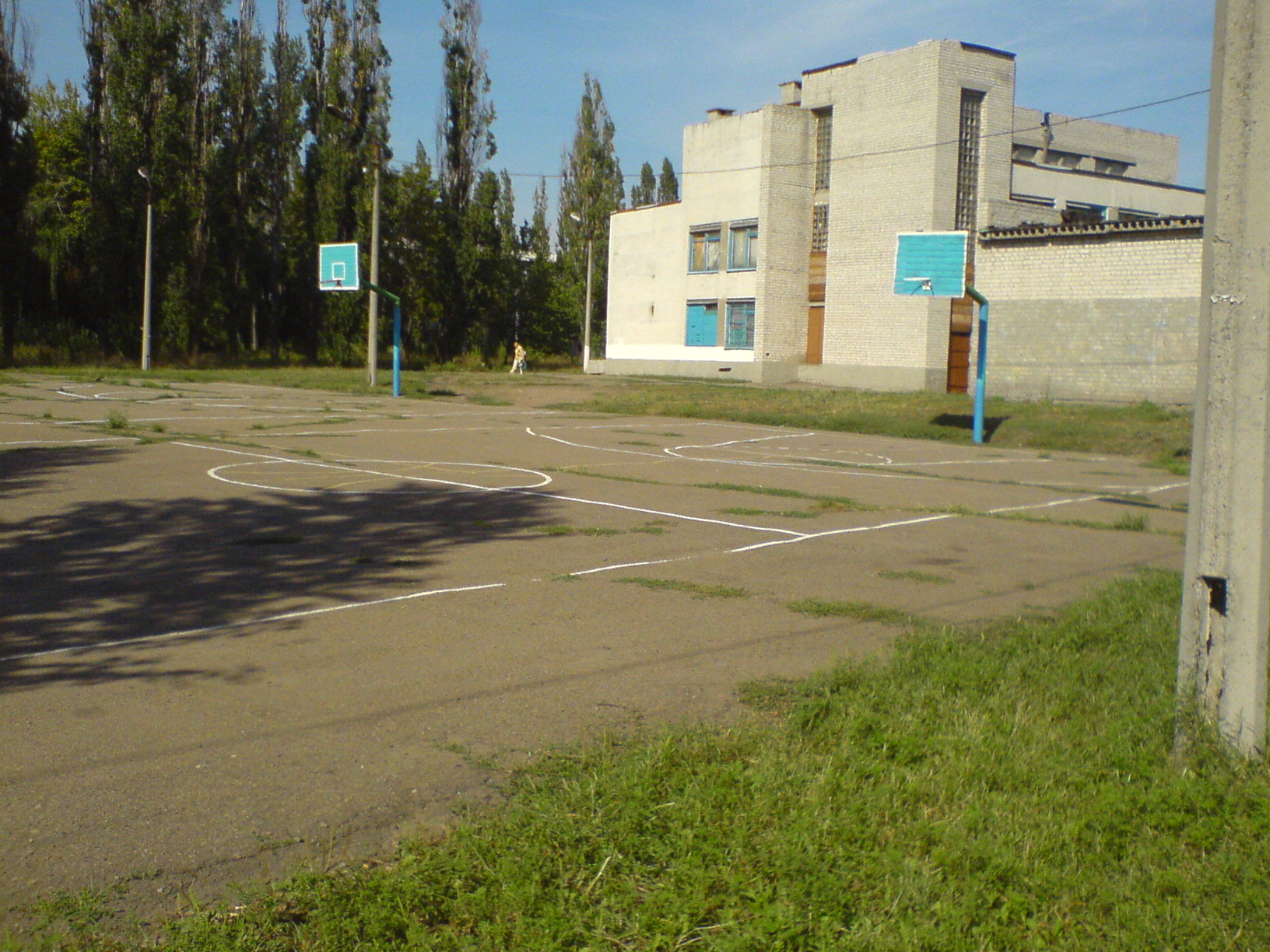
- School No. 17 in the city

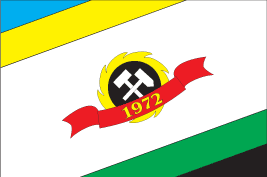
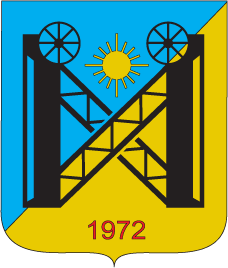
- Flag Seal
- Interactive map of Sukhodilsk
- Location of Sievero-Hundorivskyi within Luhansk Oblast Location of Sukhodilsk within Ukraine
- Country: Ukraine
- Oblast: Luhansk Oblast
- Raion: Dovzhansk Raion
- Hromada: Sorokyne urban hromada

Area
  - Total: 10 km^{2} (3.9 sq mi)

Population (2022)
  - Total: 20,390
  - Density: 2,000/km^{2} (5,300/sq mi)
- Time zone: UTC+2 (EET)
  - Summer (DST): UTC+3 (EEST)

Sukhodilsk (Ukrainian: Суходільськ [sʊxoˈd⁽ʲ⁾ilʲsʲk]; Russian: Суходольск, romanized: Sukhodolsk) is a city in Sorokyne urban hromada, Dovzhansk Raion (district) of Luhansk Oblast in Ukraine. Population: 20,390 (2022 estimate), 21,061 (2013 est.).

Since 2014, Sukhodilsk has been under the effective control of the self-proclaimed by the Luhansk People's Republic.

== Demographics ==
Ethnic composition and native languages as of the Ukrainian Census of 2001:

Ethnic groups in Sukhodilsk
	percent
Russians	60.42%
Ukrainians	36.92%
Belarusians	1.58%
Tatars	0.35%
Moldovans	0.25%
Armenians	0.17%

Native languages in Sukhodilsk
	percent
Russian	92.4%
Ukrainian	7.3%
Belarusian	0.1%

== Notable people ==
- Oleksandr Berezhnyi (1957-2025), professional association football player
