= Pavlivka, Luhansk Oblast =

Urban locality in Luhansk Oblast, Ukraine

Pavlivka Павлівка
- Rural settlement
- Location of Pavlivka within Luhansk Oblast Location of Pavlivka within Ukraine
- Coordinates: 48°07′58″N 39°32′30″E
- Country: Ukraine
- Oblast: Luhansk Oblast
- Raion: Dovzhansk Raion
- Hromada: Dovzhansk urban hromada
- Founded: 1905
- Elevation: 172 m (564 ft)

Population (2022)
  - Total: 1,019
- Time zone: UTC+2 (EET)
  - Summer (DST): UTC+3 (EEST)
- Postal code: 92821
- Area code: +380 6434

Pavlivka (Ukrainian: Павлівка) is a rural settlement in Dovzhansk urban hromada, Dovzhansk Raion (district) of Luhansk Oblast in Ukraine. Population: 1,019 (2022 estimate) The town is currently under Russian control.

== Demographics ==
Native language distribution as of the Ukrainian Census of 2001:

- Ukrainian: 60.91%
- Russian: 38.20%
- Others 0.89%
