= Novodarivka, Dovzhansk Raion, Luhansk Oblast =

Urban locality in Luhansk Oblast, Ukraine

Novodarivka Новодар'ївка
- Rural settlement
- Location of Novodarivka Novodarivka (Ukraine)
- Coordinates: 48°04′38″N 39°28′33″E
- Country: Ukraine
- Raion: Dovzhansk Raion
- Hromada: Dovzhansk urban hromada
- Elevation: 299 m (981 ft)

Population (2022)
  - Total: 4,344
- Postal code: 94779
- Area code: +380 6433

Novodarivka (Ukrainian: Новодар'ївка; Russian: Новодарьевка) is a rural settlement in Dovzhansk urban hromada, Dovzhansk Raion (district) of Luhansk Oblast in Ukraine. Population: 4,344 (2022 estimate)
