= Kondriuche =

Village in Dovzhansk, Luhansk, Ukraine

Coordinates: 48°01′52″N 39°37′23″E

Kondriuche (Ukrainian: Кондрю́че; Russian: Кондрючее, romanized: Kondryucheye) is a village in eastern Ukraine, located in Dovzhansk urban hromada, Dovzhansk Raion, Luhansk Oblast. Its population is 278 people.

The village contains a "House of Health" built by Porfiry Ivanov. It is the source of the Kundriucha river, which is also known as the Kondriucha.

== History ==
On 12 June 2020, the Ukrainian parliament assigned Kondriuche to Dovzhansk urban hromada.

== Demographics ==
According to the 2001 Ukrainian census, the village had a population of 278 people. Their native languages were 52.88% Ukrainian, 46.76% Russian, and 0.36% other languages.
