= Teple =

Urban locality in Luhansk Oblast, Ukraine

Teple Тепле
- Rural settlement
- Interactive map of Teple
- Location of Krasnodon within Luhansk Oblast#Location of Krasnodon within Ukraine Teple (Ukraine)
- Coordinates: 48°19′58″N 39°32′32″E
- Country: Ukraine
- Oblast: Luhansk Oblast
- Raion: Dovzhansk Raion
- Hromada: Sorokyne urban hromada
- Founded: 1910
- Elevation: 171 m (561 ft)

Population (2022)
  - Total: 5,201
- Time zone: UTC+2 (EET)
  - Summer (DST): UTC+3 (EEST)
- Postal code: 94430
- Area code: +380 6435

Teple (Ukrainian: Тепле), also known as Krasnodon (Ukrainian: Краснодон) before 2016, is a rural settlement in Sorokyne urban hromada, Dovzhansk Raion (district) of Luhansk Oblast in Ukraine. Population: 5,201 (2022 estimate)

== Demographics ==
Native language distribution as of the Ukrainian Census of 2001:

- Russian: 97.80%
- Ukrainian: 2.12%
- Others 0.08%
