= Naholno-Tarasivka =

Urban locality in Luhansk Oblast, Ukraine

Naholno-Tarasivka Нагольно-Тарасівка
- Rural settlement
- Location of Naholno-Tarasivka Naholno-Tarasivka (Ukraine)
- Coordinates: 47°59′40″N 39°28′23″E
- Country: Ukraine
- Oblast: Luhansk Oblast
- Raion: Dovzhansk Raion
- Hromada: Dovzhansk urban hromada
- Elevation: 296 m (971 ft)

Population (2022)
  - Total: 2,049
- Postal code: 94792
- Area code: +380 6433

Naholno-Tarasivka (Ukrainian: Нагольно-Тарасівка; Russian: Нагольно-Тарасовка) is a rural settlement in Dovzhansk urban hromada, Dovzhansk Raion (district) of Luhansk Oblast in Ukraine. Population: 2,049 (2022 estimate)
