= Oleksandr Koval (businessman) =

Ukrainian politician and businessman (born 1959)

- Олександр Коваль
- An official portrait of him from 2013.

People's Deputy of Ukraine
- In office 12 December 2012 – 27 November 2014

Personal details
- Born: Oleksandr Ivanovych Koval; 27 December 1959 (age 66) Pidhorodnie, Ukrainian SSR, Soviet Union
- Party: Party of Regions
- Education: Dnipro Polytechnic

Oleksandr Ivanovych Koval (Ukrainian: Олександр Іванович Коваль; born 27 December 1959) is a Ukrainian politician and businessman who served as a People's Deputy of Ukraine from 2012 to 2014, representing the 7th convocation of the Verkhovna Rada as a Party of Regions member. Koval was also a director of multiple mines within the Donbas, such as Sverdlovanthracite in Sverdlovsk, the Donetsk Coal Energy Company, and the Zapadno-Donbasska mine in Ternivka.

== Early life ==
Koval was born on 27 December 1959 in the city of Pidhorodnie, which was then part of the Ukrainian SSR in the Soviet Union. He was born into a family of employees. After graduating from secondary school, he attended the Dnipro Polytechnic starting in 1977 within the Faculty of Mining. He graduated in 1982 with a specialisation in technology and mechanisation of mineral deposit mining. After graduation, he began his professional career by becoming a miner at the Dniprovska Mine starting in 1982, which is part of Pavlogradugol in Dnipropetrovsk Oblast. Koval worked there for only a year before moving to the M.I. Stashkov Mine, which is also in the oblast but in Shakhtarske. He remained in Staskhov for nearly a decade from 1982 to 1992, working his way up from mining foreman to deputy section chief and then mining section chief. Once he achieved the latter role, he moved to the Mine named after the Heroes of Space in Pavlohrad, where he was appointed Head of the Mining Site. He was eventually promoted to deputy director by 2003.

== Business career ==
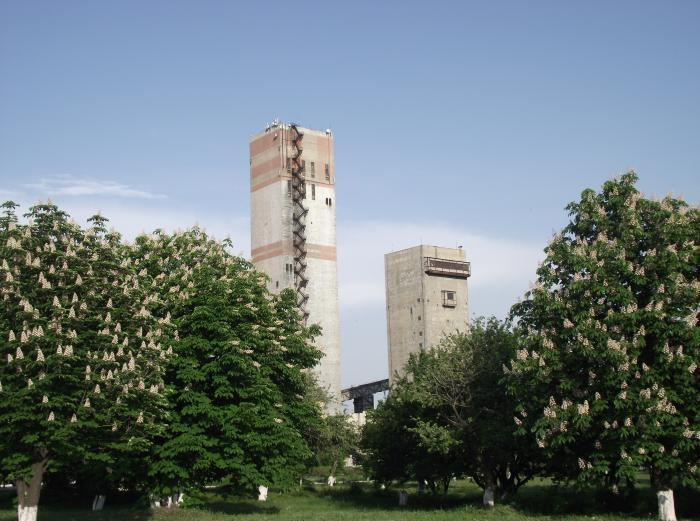
Mine "Chervonyi Partyza", which is part of Sverdlovanthracite and is located in Voznesenivka.

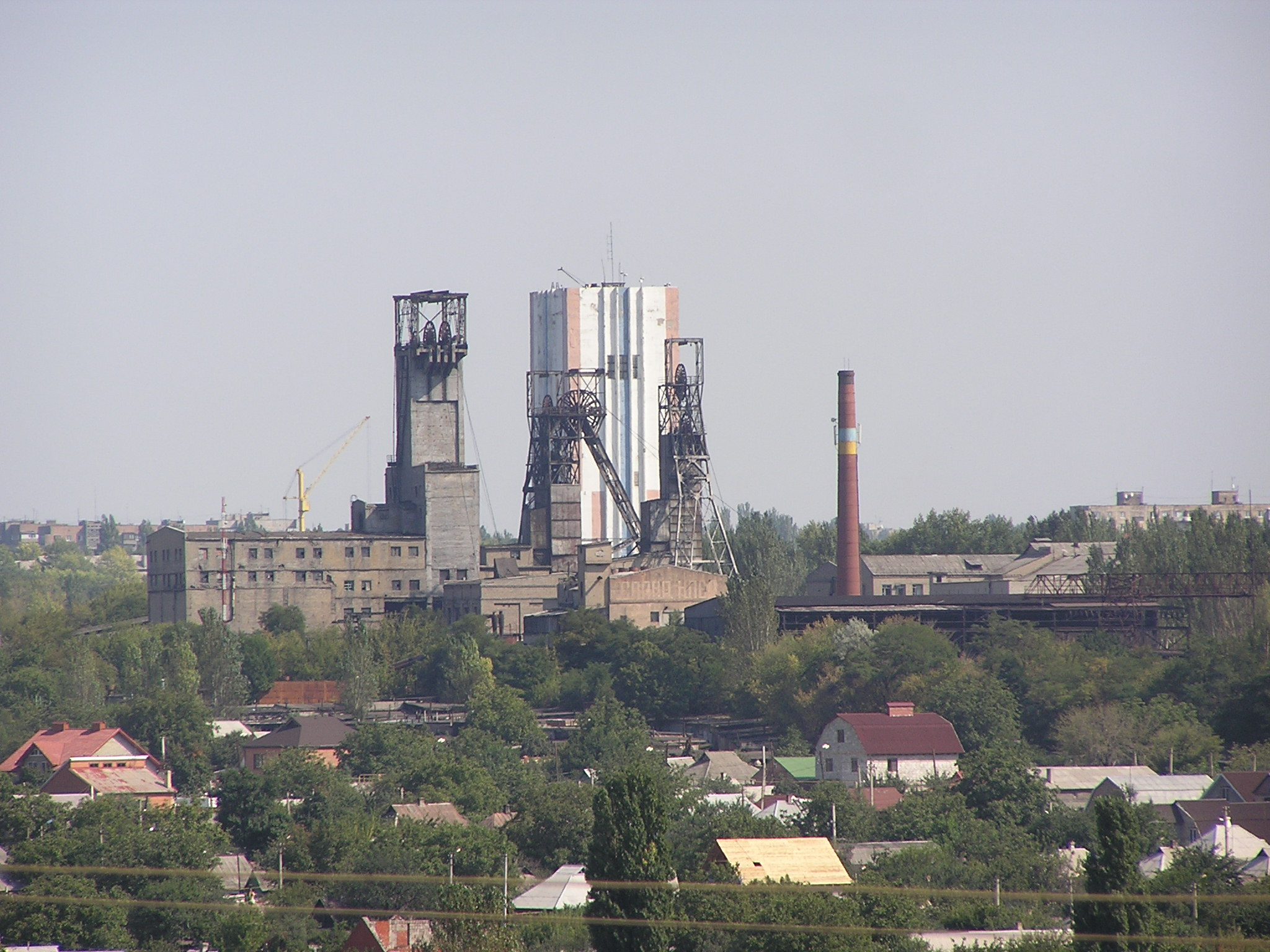
Mine "Kalinin", which is part of the Donetsk Coal Energy Company and is in Donetsk.

In 2004, he was finally appointed as director of the Zapadno-Donbasska mine in Ternivka, which is also owned by Pavlogradugol. Two years later, in 2006, he was appointed director of Sverdlovanthracite. His tenure there was only interrupted once, from the summer of 2009 to 2010, when he became acting general director of the Donetsk Coal Energy Company after the previous director, Vyacheslav Danilov, was fired due to non-payment of wages. He returned to Sverdlovanthracite on 15 March 2010, when the Ministry of Coal Energy dismissed Yuriy Glebov from the post of director. During his second tenure there, Sverdlovanthracite was absorbed into DTEK, which was reported to be because the enterprise was struggling to stay afloat at the time. The official concession of the company was dated December 2011, when DTEK signed an agreement with the Ministry of Energy for a period of 49 years. Koval, at the time, also said that he expected DTEK to implement new plans for the development of the mine, and return to the same production level as prior to 1990.

After he returned to his business career following his term in parliament and with the loss of control in Sverdlovsk due to the War in the Donbas, he joined the Dniprovska mine (where he had begun his career) on 14 December 2015 as its director. He replaced Vitaliy Movchan, who had headed Dniprovska after it was taken over by DTEK in 2013. He stated that his main priority was a better working front and coal quality. Sometime later, at least before 2017, he left the enterprise and became an adviser to the head of DTEK Pavlogradugol. By 2017, he said he had stopped working for DTEK. Three years later, on 28 October 2020, he was appointed by the Ministry of Energy as acting general director of the state enterprise Dobropillia Coal in Donetsk Oblast. Upon taking the post, he said he would together with DTEK at the enterprise, although some local media questioned the decision to appoint him due to his relations with DTEK. The enterprise was formally transferred back to the state on 25 January 2021, after DTEK had leased the mines from the enterprise starting in 2010-11. Koval said DTEK had no more infleunce in the company, and that the only authority was the Ministry of Energy, although he said some equipment was taken by DTEK that was "not needed". At the same time, in 2021, Koval was accused of doing preferntial beneficial contracts with DTEK regardless and DTEK saigned a 6 million hryvnias lease.

== Political career ==
Koval first entered politics in 2005, when he became a deputy of the Dnipropetrovsk Oblast Council. He remained on the council for a term until 2010, when he instead entered the Sverdlovsk City Council that year. In Sverdlovsk, he was called a shoo-in candidate due to his close associations with DTEK and for leading Sverdlovanthracite. In 2012, he decided to run in the 2012 Ukrainian parliamentary elections in constituency No. 111 (Sverdlovsk, Rovenky, and parts of Antratsyt urban hromada, all in Luhansk Oblast) as a member of the pro-Russian Party of Regions. That election season, he was mainly opposed in the district by Viktor Bondarev, a miner who had been awarded the title of Hero of Ukraine. Koval mostly aimed his campaign at Sverdlovsk, due to his activities there, while Bondarev was mainly known in Rovenky, where he came from. Oleksandr Gaidei also ran in the race and was a member of the Communist Party of Ukraine, and was also an entrepreneur and a member of the Sverdlovsk City Council, like Koval. During the race, one of the candidates, Kostyantyn Ilchenko, said that Koval was not actually that affiliated with the Party of Regions, and said that instead he was allegedly the chosen candidate from Akhmetov and DTEK and that campaign money was coming out of the Sverdlovanthracite enterprise for his election. Some media also accused him of "preparing falsifications" for the race, although these accusations remained allegations.

In the end, Koval won the race with a majority at 52.04% against 6 other opponents. Upon joining the Rada, he joined the Party of Regions faction and became a member of the Committee on Entrepreneurship, Regulatory, and Antimonopoly Policy in December. During his time in the Rada, he tended to vote with the party line and voted "for" on the so-called "laws on dictatorship", which cracked down on the rights to protest and free speech in response to Euromaidan. He also voted for the 2012 law On the Principles of State Language Policy, which expanded the use of regional languages in the country, particularly Russian. He was one of 190 out of the 194 Party of Regions members to do so, with the other four abstaining. Upon the early dissolution of parliament in 2014 and the declaration of the snap 2014 Ukrainian parliamentary elections, Koval attempted to run again for another term. This time, he was on the party list of the Opposition Bloc, which was considered a successor to the Party of Regions, and was No. 29 on that list. He was not selected, and thereafter retired from politics.

== Personal life ==
He is married to a woman known as Tetiana Anatolyevna, and together they have two sons: Ivan (born 1985) and Alexander (born 1988).

He was the president of the Sverlovsk Football Club prior to 2014
