= Kalynivka, Dovzhansk Raion, Luhansk Oblast =

Kalynivka Калинівка
- Rural settlement
- Interactive map of Kalynivka
- Location of Kalynivka within Ukraine Kalynivka (Ukraine)
- Coordinates: 48.1°N 39.488611°E
- Country: Ukraine
- Oblast: Luhansk Oblast
- Raion: Dovzhansk Raion
- Hromada: Dovzhansk urban hromada
- Founded: 1950

Area
  - Total: 0.216 km^{2} (0.083 sq mi)

Population (2001 census)
  - Total: 287
  - Density: 1,330/km^{2} (3,440/sq mi)
- Time zone: UTC+2 (EET)
  - Summer (DST): UTC+3 (EEST)
- Postal code: 94786
- Area code: +380 6433

Kalynivka (Ukrainian: Калинівка; Russian: Калиновка) is a rural settlement in Dovzhansk urban hromada, Dovzhansk Raion (district) of Luhansk Oblast in Ukraine, at about 50 km SSE from the centre of Luhansk.

The settlement was taken under control of pro-Russian forces during the War in Donbass, that started in 2014.
