= Sievero-Hundorivskyi =

Urban locality in Luhansk Oblast, Ukraine

Sievero-Hundorivskyi Сєверо-Гундорівський
- Rural settlement
- Location of Sievero-Hundorivskyi within Luhansk Oblast Location of Sievero-Hundorivskyi within Ukraine
- Coordinates: 48°22′11″N 39°53′0″E
- Country: Ukraine
- Oblast: Luhansk Oblast
- Raion: Dovzhansk Raion
- Hromada: Sorokyne urban hromada
- Founded: 1949
- Elevation: 151 m (495 ft)

Population (2022)
  - Total: 1,065
- Time zone: UTC+2 (EET)
  - Summer (DST): UTC+3 (EEST)
- Postal code: 94427
- Area code: +380 6435

Sievero-Hundorivskyi (Ukrainian: Сєверо-Гундорівський) is a rural settlement in Sorokyne urban hromada, Dovzhansk Raion (district) of Luhansk Oblast in Ukraine. Population: 1,065 (2022 estimate)

== Demographics ==
Native language distribution as of the Ukrainian Census of 2001:

- Ukrainian: 6.02%
- Russian: 93.38%
