= Viktor Nazarov =

Viktor Nazarov may refer to:

- Viktor Nazarov (politician)
- Viktor Nazarov (general)
