= Klenovyi =

Urban locality in Luhansk Oblast, Ukraine

Klenovyi Кленовий
- Rural settlement
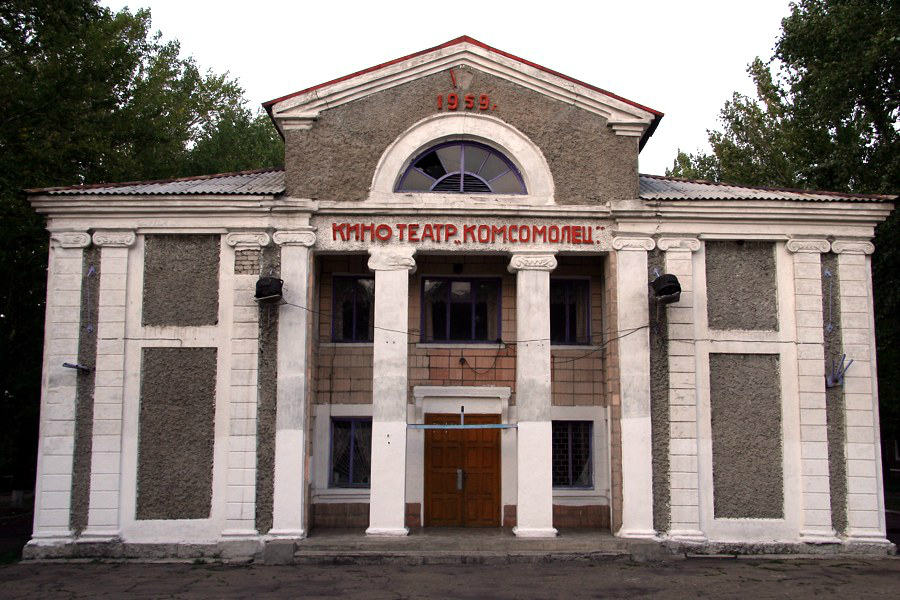

- Location of Klenovyi Klenovyi (Ukraine)
- Coordinates: 48°07′08″N 39°27′23″E
- Country: Ukraine
- Oblast: Luhansk Oblast
- Raion: Dovzhansk Raion
- Hromada: Dovzhansk urban hromada
- Elevation: 288 m (945 ft)

Population (2022)
  - Total: 2,054
- Postal code: 94783
- Area code: +380 6433

Klenovyi (Ukrainian: Кленовий; Russian: Кленовый) is a rural settlement in Dovzhansk urban hromada, Dovzhansk Raion (district) of Luhansk Oblast in Ukraine. Population: 2,054 (2022 estimate)
