= Uralo-Kavkaz =

Urban locality in Luhansk Oblast, Ukraine

Uralo-Kavkaz Урало-Кавказ
- Rural settlement
- Location of Uralo-Kavkaz Uralo-Kavkaz (Ukraine)
- Coordinates: 48°18′57″N 39°48′28″E
- Country: Ukraine
- Oblast: Luhansk Oblast
- Raion: Dovzhansk Raion
- Hromada: Sorokyne urban hromada
- Founded: 1914

Population (2022)
  - Total: 2,453
- Time zone: UTC+2 (EET)
  - Summer (DST): UTC+3 (EEST)

Uralo-Kavkaz (Ukrainian and Russian: Урало-Кавказ) is a rural settlement in Sorokyne urban hromada, Dovzhansk Raion (district) of Luhansk Oblast in Ukraine. Population: 2,453 (2022 estimate), 2,555 (2013 est.).

The settlement is located on the banks of the Duvanna River, in the basin of the Donets River, close to the border with Russia.

== History ==
Uralo-Kavkaz (literally Urals and Caucasus) was founded in 1914, when the Urals and Caucasus Joint-stock Company started operating a coal mine here. The settlement was developed to serve this one and the subsequently opened mines. At the time, it belonged to Slavyanoserbsk Uyezd of Yekaterinoslav Governorate. In 1920, Donets Governorate with the center in Luhansk (later in Bakhmut) was established, and the uyezd was transferred to Donets Governorate. On 7 March 1923, the uyezds were abolished, and Sorokine Raion of Luhansk Okruha was established. Uralo-Kavkaz was included into Sorokine Raion. On 14 February 1925, Donets Governorate was abolished, and okruhas were directly subordinated to the Ukrainian Soviet Socialist Republic. On 2 September 1930, okruhas were abolished as well, and raions were directly subordinated to the Republic. In 1930, Sorokine Raion became a Russian National Raion; this status was later in the 1930s abolished. On 2 July 1932, Donetsk Oblast was established, and Sorokine Raion was transferred to Donetsk Oblast. In March 1936, Sorokine Raion was renamed Krasnodon Raion. On 3 June 1938, Donetsk Oblast was split into Stalino Oblast and Voroshilovgrad Oblast. When Krasnodon became a city of oblast significance and split off Krasnodon Raion, Uralo-Kavkaz was subordinated to the city of Krasnodon. In 1958, Voroshilovgrad Oblast was renamed Luhansk Oblast, in 1970 it was renamed back Voroshilovgrad Oblast, and in 1991 it was renamed Luhansk Oblast.

In January 1989 the population was 3365 people.

After 1991, in independent Ukraine, Uralo-Kavkaz became a major center of criminal activity. The only significant economic activity in the settlement involved illegal coal mining and smuggling of goods through the border with Russia.

Since 2014, Uralo-Kavkaz has been controlled by forces of the Luhansk People's Republic.
