= Valianivske =

Urban locality in Luhansk Oblast, Ukraine

Valianivske Вальянівське
- Rural settlement
- Location of Leninske within Luhansk Oblast#Location of Leninske within Ukraine Valianivske (Ukraine)
- Coordinates: 48°04′36″N 39°33′40″E
- Country: Ukraine
- Oblast: Luhansk Oblast
- Raion: Dovzhansk Raion
- Hromada: Dovzhansk urban hromada
- Founded: 1900
- Elevation: 279 m (915 ft)

Population (2022)
  - Total: 3,298
- Time zone: UTC+2 (EET)
  - Summer (DST): UTC+3 (EEST)
- Postal code: 94835
- Area code: +380 6434

Valianivske (Ukrainian: Вальянівське; Russian: Вальяновское), formerly known as Leninske (Ukrainian: Ленінське; Russian: Ленинское), is a rural settlement in Dovzhansk urban hromada, Dovzhansk Raion (district) of Luhansk Oblast in Ukraine. Population: 3,298 (2022 estimate)

== History ==
The area around the town has been inhabited since ancient times, as shown by archeological findings.

Coal was discovered in the region around modern Leninske in 1903, during the time of the late Russian Empire. Construction on the first coal mine began in 1910. Other mines joined it over time, with worker's settlements built around them for the miners to live in permanently. During the Russian Civil War, the mines and settlements changed hands several times, before finally falling into the stable control of the Bolsheviks, who established the communist Soviet Union on much of the former territory of the Russian Empire.

In 1932, the Soviet government renamed one of the mines after Vladimir Lenin. In either 1938 or 1944, the mines and settlements were all united into an urban-type settlement named Leninske. During World War II, Leninske was occupied by Nazi Germany from July 1942 to February 1943.

In spring 2014, Leninske was taken over by the Luhansk People's Republic, a militant group backed by Russia. In 2016, in accordance with laws enacted by the Verkhovna Rada during decommunization in Ukraine, Leninske was renamed to Valianivske. On 17 October 2018, the OSCE Special Monitoring Mission to Ukraine was unable to access and observe the situation in Valianivske due to unclear circumstances.

On 12 June 2020, the Verkhovna Rada assigned Valianivske to Dovzhansk urban hromada. On 17 July the same year, Valianivske - along with the rest of Dovzhansk urban hromada - was assigned to Dovzhansk Raion.

== Demographics ==
As of the 2001 Ukrainian census, the population was 4,100 people. Ethnically, most were Russians and Ukrainians. 92.05% of the population natively spoke Russian, 7.16% were native speakers of Ukrainian, and 0.26% natively spoke other languages.

Population history
| Year | 1967 | 2001 | 2014 | 2022 |
| Pop. | 18,165 | 4,100 | 3,346 | 3,298 |
| ±% p.a. | — | −4.28% | −1.55% | −0.18% |
