= Novodarivka =

Novodarivka may refer to several places in Ukraine:

- Novodarivka, a town in Dovzhansk Raion, Luhansk Oblast, Ukraine.
- Novodarivka, a village in Rovenky Raion, Luhansk Oblast, Ukraine
- Novodarivka, a village in Polohy Raion, Zaporizhzhia Oblast, Ukraine
