= Velykokamianka =

Urban locality in Luhansk Oblast, Ukraine

Velykokamianka Великокам'янка
- Rural settlement
- Location of Velykokamianka Velykokamianka (Ukraine)
- Coordinates: 48°08′26″N 39°26′02″E
- Country: Ukraine
- Oblast: Luhansk Oblast
- Raion: Dovzhansk Raion
- Hromada: Dovzhansk urban hromada
- Elevation: 218 m (715 ft)

Population (2022)
  - Total: 1,138
- Postal code: 94785
- Area code: +380 6433

Velykokamianka (Ukrainian: Великокам'янка; Russian: Великокаменка) is a rural settlement in Dovzhansk urban hromada, Dovzhansk Raion (district) of Luhansk Oblast in Ukraine. Population: 1,138 (2022 estimate)
