= Vedmezhe =

Urban locality in Luhansk Oblast, Ukraine

Vedmezhe Ведмеже
- Rural settlement
- Location of Volodarsk within Luhansk Oblast#Location of Volodarsk within Ukraine Vedmezhe (Ukraine)
- Coordinates: 48°07′27″N 39°35′08″E
- Country: Ukraine
- Oblast: Luhansk Oblast
- Raion: Dovzhansk Raion
- Hromada: Dovzhansk urban hromada
- Founded: 1907
- Elevation: 274 m (899 ft)

Population (2022)
  - Total: 2,727
- Time zone: UTC+2 (EET)
  - Summer (DST): UTC+3 (EEST)
- Postal code: 92823
- Area code: +380 6434

Vedmezhe (Ukrainian: Ведмеже) or Volodarsk (Ukrainian: Володарськ) is a rural settlement in Dovzhansk urban hromada, Dovzhansk Raion (district) of Luhansk Oblast in Ukraine. Population: 2,727 (2022 estimate).

== History ==
The town has its origins in 1905, when an unnamed worker's settlement grew up around a mine named after the Marxist revolutionary V. Volodarsky. In 1923, it officially received the name Volodarsk. In 1938, it received urban-type settlement status.

During the war in Donbas, the town has been occupied by pro-Russian militants. In 2016, the Ukrainian government renamed Volodarsk to Vedmezhe as part of decommunization in Ukraine. In June 2020, the town was assigned to Dovzhansk urban hromada.

== Demographics ==
As of the 2001 Ukrainian census, the town had a population of 3,208 people. Their native languages were:

- Ukrainian: 33.38%
- Russian: 65.85%
- Others 0.37%
