= Sorokyne urban hromada =

Sorokyne urban hromada Сорокинська міська громада
- Hromada
- Interactive map of Sorokyne urban hromada
- Country: Ukraine
- Oblast: Luhansk
- Raion: Dovzhansk
- Settlements: 44
- Cities: 2
- Rural settlements: 5
- Villages: 31
- Towns: 6

Sorokyne urban hromada (Ukrainian: Сорокинська міська громада) is a hromada of Ukraine, located in Dovzhansk Raion, Luhansk Oblast. Its administrative center is the city Sorokyne.

The hromada contains 44 settlements: 2 cities (Sorokyne and Sukhodilsk), 6 urban-type settlements (Izvaryne, Krasnodarskyi, Sievernyi, Sievero-Hundorivskyi, Teple, and Uralo-Kavkaz), 31 villages:

- Batyr
- Berehove
- Bilenke
- Biloskelyuvate
- Velikiy Sukhodil
- Verkhnoharasymivka
- Verkhnyoderevechka
- Verkhnyoshevyrivka
- Vlasivka
- Vodotok
- Habun
- Davido-Mykilske
- Druzhne
- Ivanivka
- Illivka
- Korolivka
- Kruzhilivka
- Lypove
- Makariv Yar
- Maly Sukhodil
- Mykyshivka
- Nizhnyoderevechka
- Nizhnya Harasymivka
- Novokiivka
- Ogulchansk
- Panteliivka
- Pidhirne
- Popivka
- Radisne
- Khoroshilove
- Khryashchivka

And 5 rural-type settlements: Zahidniy, Nizhnya Shevyrivka, Porechye, Svitlichne, and Malokalynove.

== See also ==
- List of hromadas of Ukraine
