= Dovzhansk urban hromada =

- Hromada
- Interactive map of Dovzhansk urban hromada
- Country: Ukraine
- Oblast: Luhansk Oblast
- Raion: Dovzhansk Raion
- Admin. center: Dovzhansk
- Settlements: 54
- Cities: 2
- Rural settlements: 11
- Villages: 30
- Towns: 11

Dovzhansk urban hromada (Ukrainian: Довжанська міська громада) is a nominal hromada of Ukraine, located within Dovzhansk Raion, Luhansk Oblast. Its administrative center is Dovzhansk, also known as Sverdlovsk.

The territory of the hromada has been occupied by Russia since before its creation on 12 June 2020, so its existence is only de jure, not de facto.

The hromada contains 54 settlements: 2 cities (Dovzhansk and Voznesenivka), 22 rural settlements (Valianivske, Vedmezhe, Velykokamianka, Dubove, Klenovy, Krynychne, Kundriuche, Naholno-Tarasivka, Novodarivka, Pavlivka, Shakhtarske, also Bratske, Valyanivsk, Dovzhanske, Ivashchenko, Kalynivka, Kiselev, Pokrovka, Prokhladne, Ustinivka, Fedorivka, and Khmelnytskyi), and 30 villages:

- Ananiivka
- Antrakop
- Astakhove
- Berezivka
- Bobrykivka
- Cheremshyne
- Darivka
- Darino-Yermakivka
- Zelenopilia
- Zimovniki
- Kalinnyk
- Karpove-Kripenske
- Kondryuche
- Korobkine
- Kuryache
- Lyubime
- Malovedmezhe
- Maryivka
- Matviivka
- Mayak
- Medvezhanka
- Mykolaivka
- Nahirne
- Novoborovytsy
- Oleksandrivka
- Panchenkove
- Provalya
- Rytykove
- Utkine
- Verkhniotuzlove

== See also ==
- List of hromadas of Ukraine
