= Izvaryne =

Urban locality in Luhansk Oblast, Ukraine

Izvaryne Ізварине
- Rural settlement
- Location of Izvaryne Izvaryne (Ukraine)
- Coordinates: 48°17′15″N 39°53′35″E
- Country: Ukraine
- Oblast: Luhansk Oblast
- Raion: Dovzhansk Raion
- Hromada: Sorokyne urban hromada
- Founded: 1914

Government
  - Mayor: Mykhailo Denikin

Area
  - Total: 7.82 km^{2} (3.02 sq mi)

Population (2022)
  - Total: 1,560
  - Density: 199/km^{2} (517/sq mi)
- Postal code: 94445
- Area code: +380 6435
- Website: http://krasnodon.org.ua/

Izvaryne (Ukrainian: Ізварине; Russian: Изварино, romanized: Izvarino) is a rural settlement located on the E40 highway in Sorokyne urban hromada, Dovzhansk Raion (district) of Luhansk Oblast in Ukraine. It is also an important road and railway crossing point on the Ukrainian side of the Russia–Ukraine border. There are facilities at the crossing for motorcars, lorries, and trains.

Izvaryne lies across from the Russian town of Donetsk in Rostov Oblast, not to be confused with the Ukrainian city of Donetsk. Population: 1,560 (2022 estimate), 1,692 (2013 est.).

The settlement came under the control of the Luhansk People's Republic in mid-2014. Following the 2022 annexation referendums in Russian-occupied Ukraine, Russia has claimed the settlement as part of their LPR / LNR.

== History ==
The border post became part of protracted struggle between the State Border Guard Service of Ukraine and pro-Russian insurgents affiliated with the Luhansk People's Republic during the rising unrest in Ukraine in the aftermath of the 2014 Ukrainian revolution. Multiple attacks by the insurgents upon the post were repelled. Despite this, the Border Guard was overwhelmed by insurgents on 20 June 2014, and was forced to retreat into Russian territory, where many guardsmen were captured, and later returned to Ukraine.

By late June 2014, the LPR had announced their complete control of the border post. The border point would reportedly be used by insurgents as a vital link to supplies and reinforcements from Russia.

== Demographics ==
According to the 2001 census, the population of the village was 2,091. 4.16% said that their native language was Ukrainian, whilst 94.88% said that it was Russian.
