= Shakhtarske, Luhansk Oblast =

Urban locality in Luhansk Oblast, Ukraine

Shakhtarske Шахтарське
- Rural settlement
- Location of Shakhtarske within Luhansk Oblast#Location of Shakhtarske within Ukraine Shakhtarske (Ukraine)
- Coordinates: 48°02′59″N 39°33′10″E
- Country: Ukraine
- Oblast: Luhansk Oblast
- Raion: Dovzhansk Raion
- Hromada: Dovzhansk urban hromada
- Founded: 1938
- Elevation: 274 m (899 ft)

Population (2022)
  - Total: 3,495
- Time zone: UTC+2 (EET)
  - Summer (DST): UTC+3 (EEST)
- Postal code: 92853
- Area code: +380 6434

Shakhtarske (Ukrainian: Шахтарське) is a rural settlement in Dovzhansk urban hromada, Dovzhansk Raion (district) of Luhansk Oblast in Ukraine. Population: 3,495 (2022 estimate)

== Demographics ==
Native language distribution as of the Ukrainian Census of 2001:

- Ukrainian: 7.06%
- Russian: 92.79%
- Others 0.15%
