= Oleksandr Berezhnyi =

Ukrainian footballer (1957–2025)

Personal information
- Full name: Oleksandr Mykolayovych Berezhnyi
- Date of birth: 8 December 1957
- Place of birth: Sukhodilsk, Voroshilovgrad Oblast, Ukrainian SSR, USSR
- Date of death: May 2025 (aged 67)
- Positions: Defender; midfielder

Youth career
- Luhansk Internat

Senior career*
Years	Team	Apps	(Gls)
1976–1981	Dynamo Kyiv	97	(11)
1981	Tavriya Simferopol	6	(0)

International career
1976–1979	Soviet Union	14	(0)
1979	Ukraine		
Medal record
Men's football
Representing Soviet Union
UEFA European U-18 Championships
Winner	1976 Hungary
- * Club domestic league appearances and goals

Oleksandr Mykolayovych Berezhnyi (Ukrainian: Олександр Миколайович Бережний; 8 December 1957 – May 2025) was a Ukrainian professional footballer who played as a defender or midfielder. Berezhnyi's death was announced on 23 May 2025. He was 67.

== International career ==
Berezhnoy made his debut for USSR on 28 November 1976 in a friendly against Argentina. He played in qualifiers for the UEFA Euro 1980 (USSR did not qualify for the final tournament).

In 1979, Berezhnoy played couple of games for Ukraine at the Spartakiad of the Peoples of the USSR.

== Honours ==
Dynamo Kyiv

- Soviet Top League: 1977
- Soviet Cup: 1978
