= Novaya Nadezhda =

Novaya Nadezhda Новая Надежда
- Settlement
- Location within Volgograd Oblast Location within Russia
- Coordinates: 48°50′N 44°18′E
- Country: Russia
- Region: Volgograd Oblast
- District: Gorodishchensky District
- Time zone: UTC+4:00

Novaya Nadezhda (Russian: Новая Надежда) is a rural locality (a settlement) and the administrative center of Novonadezhdinskoye Rural Settlement, Gorodishchensky District, Volgograd Oblast, Russia. The population was 1,570 as of 2010. There are 14 streets.

== Geography ==
Novaya Nadezhda is located in steppe, 26 km northwest of Gorodishche (the district's administrative centre) by road. Stepnoy is the nearest rural locality.
