= Viktor Nazarov (general) =

Ukrainian general (born 1962)

- Віктор Миколайович Назаров
- Born: Viktor Mykolayovych Nazarov; 11 February 1962 (age 64); Novohrad-Volynskyi, Ukrainian SSR, Soviet Union
- Military career
- Allegiance: Soviet Union; Ukraine
- Branch: Ukrainian Ground Forces
- Service years: 1983–2019
- Rank: Major general
- Conflicts: Russo-Ukrainian War; Fights on the Ukrainian-Russian border (2014)
- Awards

Viktor Mykolayovych Nazarov (Ukrainian: Віктор Миколайович Назаров; born 11 February 1962) is a Ukrainian former army officer, who was ranked a major general of the Armed Forces of Ukraine, and First Deputy Chief of the Main Operations Department of the General Staff of the Ukrainian Armed Forces until 30 September 2019.

== Biography ==
Nazarov was born on 11 February 1962 in Novohrad-Volynskyi, Zhytomyr Oblast. In 1983, he graduated from the Kiev Higher Combined Arms Command School. In August 2008, as an Assistant Minister of Defense of Ukraine, Nazarov was awarded the rank of Major General.

In March 2013, Nazarov was the First Deputy Chief of the Main Operational Department of the General Staff of the Armed Forces of Ukraine.

=== Participation in the anti-terrorist operation ===
On 21 May 2014, Nazarov was appointed the chief of operational staff of anti-terrorist operation. In this position, he planned about 40 operations, including measures to unblock the group of the Armed Forces, which defended the Luhansk airport. The nearest military units of the Armed Forces were located north of the Seversky Donets, one hundred kilometers from the garrison of Luhansk airport. developed an operation to organize an air bridge to Luhansk. 17 times transport planes successfully delivered cargo, weapons and personnel in order to create a reinforced battalion-tactical group near Luhansk, capable of conducting active offensive operations. Strategically, this would withdraw part of the enemy forces from the Kramatorsk-Slovyansk area, and, most importantly, create a bridgehead around Luhansk airfield from which it was planned to launch an offensive to the southwest in the direction of the state border to join forces moving from south to south. This would make it possible to completely block Luhansk, deprive the militants of supplies and cover the state border. But on the night of June 14, the third week of the active phase of the anti-terrorist operation, after the first plane landed in Luhansk, unloaded and took off in the opposite direction, the second plane, an IL-76 military transporter, was shot down on landing; 9 crew members and 40 paratroopers of the 25th OPDBr were killed. On that day, the anti-terrorist operation headquarters received information about the possible presence of MANPADS among the separatists, but, according to Major General Nazarov, it was contradictory and came to him after the start of the operation from four transport flights to Luhansk on the night of 14 June.

The first plane returned to the base airfield on 21 June. After the plane was shot down, the other two sides, which were already in the air, were immediately returned. The death of personnel made adjustments to the anti-terrorist operation plans: as a result, in July, Ukrainian troops were forced to break through the land corridor through Happiness to the Luhansk airfield with fighting and new losses. Control was established over Georgiev, Lutuhyn, Novosvitlivka and Khryashchuvaty. On August 24, regular units of the Russian Army went on the offensive, which made radical changes in the course of the anti-terrorist operation.

=== Court case ===
On 18 November 2014, on the Day of the General Staff of the Armed Forces of Ukraine, the Prosecutor General's Office of Ukraine announced Major General Nazarov's suspicion of negligence, which allegedly led to the death of 49 servicemen. The GPU noted: “As it turned out, military officials of the Armed Forces of Ukraine and the operational headquarters for the management of the anti-terrorist operation ignored the available information about the intensification of terrorist groups near Luhansk airport, as well as portable anti-aircraft missile systems. took measures to land the plane safely in the area of the anti-terrorist operation". After that, Major General Nazarov was hospitalized with a hypertensive crisis, and the court was unable to choose a measure of restraint. On 25 November 25 the Pechersk District Court of Kyiv ruled to arrest Major General Nazarov for two months, but at the same time allowed him to remain on bail of ₴365,000. The court later reduced the bail to ₴97,000 and allowed him to continue performing his professional duties.

On 27 March 2017, Nazarov was found guilty by the court of killing Ukrainian servicemen in the IL-76 shot down by terrorists and sentenced to 7 years in prison, without deprivation of the rank of "Major General". According to the court decision, the moral damage must be compensated by the Ministry of Defense of Ukraine. The amount of compensation was ₴500,000 in favor of relatives of victims, but compensations will be received only by the next relatives, such as parents and wives.

The actions of commanders in a combat situation should be evaluated by military specialists, military experts and military judges, not civilians.

— Stepan Poltorako on such a decision infuriated, in particular, and the president's initiation of the resumption of military courts

In September 2019, by the Order of the Ministry of Internal Affairs # 520, Nazarov was released from military service.

On 11 December 2020, the Dnipro Court of Appeals rejected the appeal of General Nazarov, who was sentenced by a court of first instance to 7 years in prison for negligence, which led to the downing of an IL-76 and the death of Ukrainian servicemen in 2014. The relevant decision was made by the court, leaving the decision of the Pavlograd district court of the region unchanged. Nazarov pleaded not guilty and stated that he would file a cassation appeal.

... Nazarov's case is a precedent that could have far-reaching consequences for the country's defense capabilities.

— Petro Poroshenko on the decision of the Dnipro Court of Appeals in the case of Major General Nazarov

On 23 December 2020, the Criminal Court of Cassation of the Supreme Court suspended the execution of the sentence of General Nazarov on the cassation filed by the lawyer. On 21 May 2021 the Criminal Court of Cassation of the Supreme Court acquitted Nazarov.

.. General Nazarov, when acting as Chief of Staff of the ATO, thought about how to protect the country and preserve its territorial integrity. In 2014, the situation was very difficult and difficult decisions were made. Nazarov sent planes to the resort? For your own purposes? No. If Nazarov hadn't done what was necessary, he would have been accused of it, they would have asked why he didn't do anything. For example, as in the Crimea, when everyone raised their paws and left without a single shot. While the war continues - we are "hostages". But the people of Ukraine, our state must appreciate this and understand: we have fulfilled our responsibilities. Nazarov did not shoot down the plane, Russia did.

— A 30 December 2020 interview with the Ukrainian online socio-political publication Obozrevatel, with Commander-in-Chief of the Armed Forces of Ukraine Ruslan Khomchak the preconditions for the downing of the IL-76 aircraft near Luhansk airport
