= Kundryuchya =

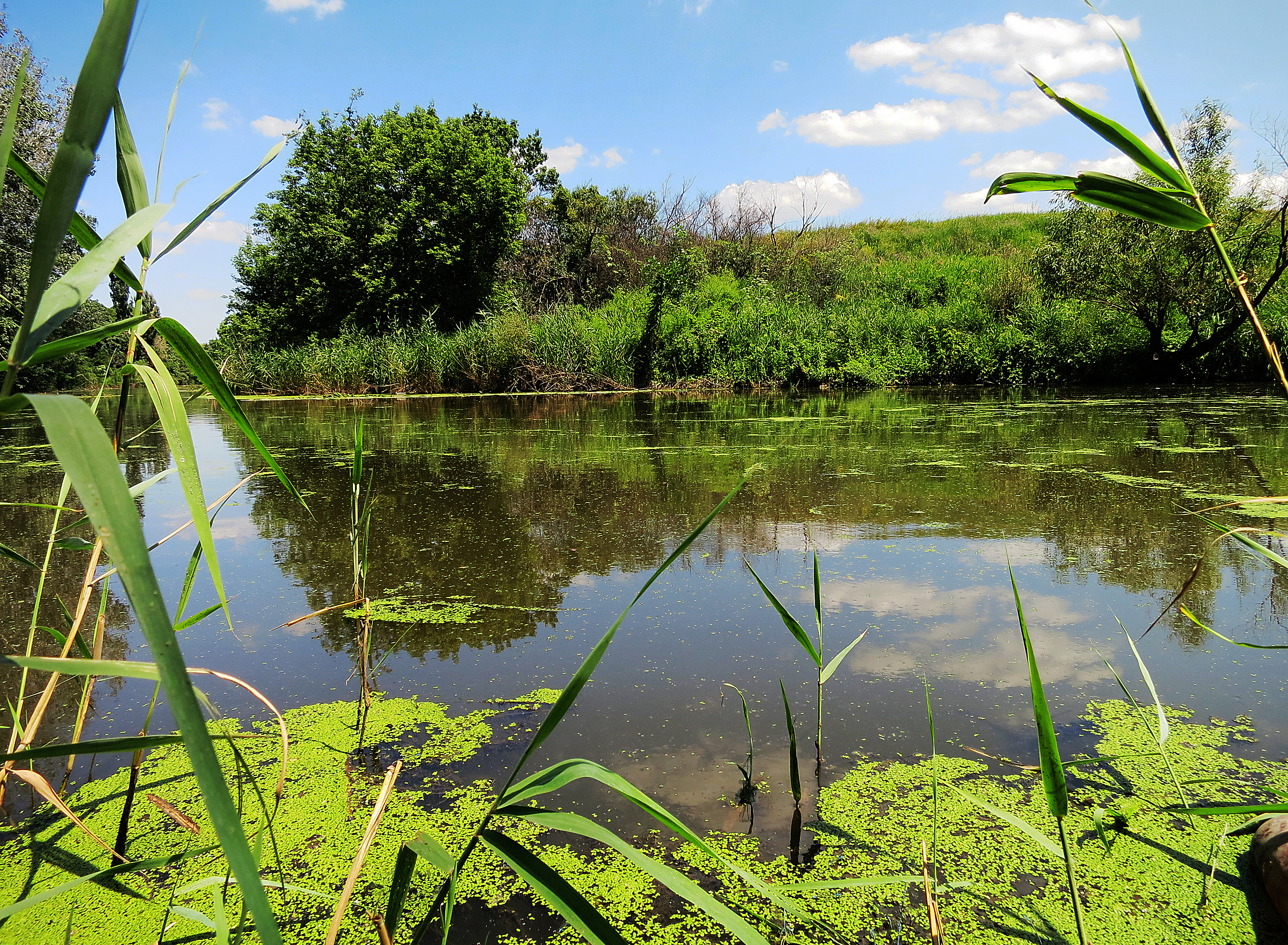
- Native name: Кундрючья (Russian)

Location
- Country: Russia, Ukraine
- Region: Rostov Oblast, Luhansk Oblast

Physical characteristics
- Source
  - location: Kondryuche
  - coordinates: 48°02′44″N 39°37′45″E
- Mouth: Donets
  - coordinates: 47°43′44″N 40°56′28″E
- Length: 244 km (152 mi)
- Basin size: 2,320 km^{2} (900 sq mi)

Basin features
- Progression: Donets→ Don→ Sea of Azov

The Kundryuchya (Russian: Кундрючья, Ukrainian: Кундрю́ча, romanized: Kundriucha) or Kondryuchya (Russian: Кондрючья; Ukrainian: Кондрю́ча) is a river in the Rostov Oblast of Russia and the Luhansk Oblast of Ukraine.

The Kundryuchya rises on the Donets Ridge in the Ukrainian Luhansk Oblast. It flows east into Russia's Rostov Oblast, cutting a deep valley into the mountainous region. The river is mainly fed by snowmelt. Between late November and mid-March, the river is covered by a layer of ice. The river has a length of 244 km and drains an area of 2320 km^{2}. The town of Krasny Sulin lies on the course of the river.
