= Voznesenivka =

City in Luhansk Oblast, Ukraine

Voznesenivka Вознесенівка
- City
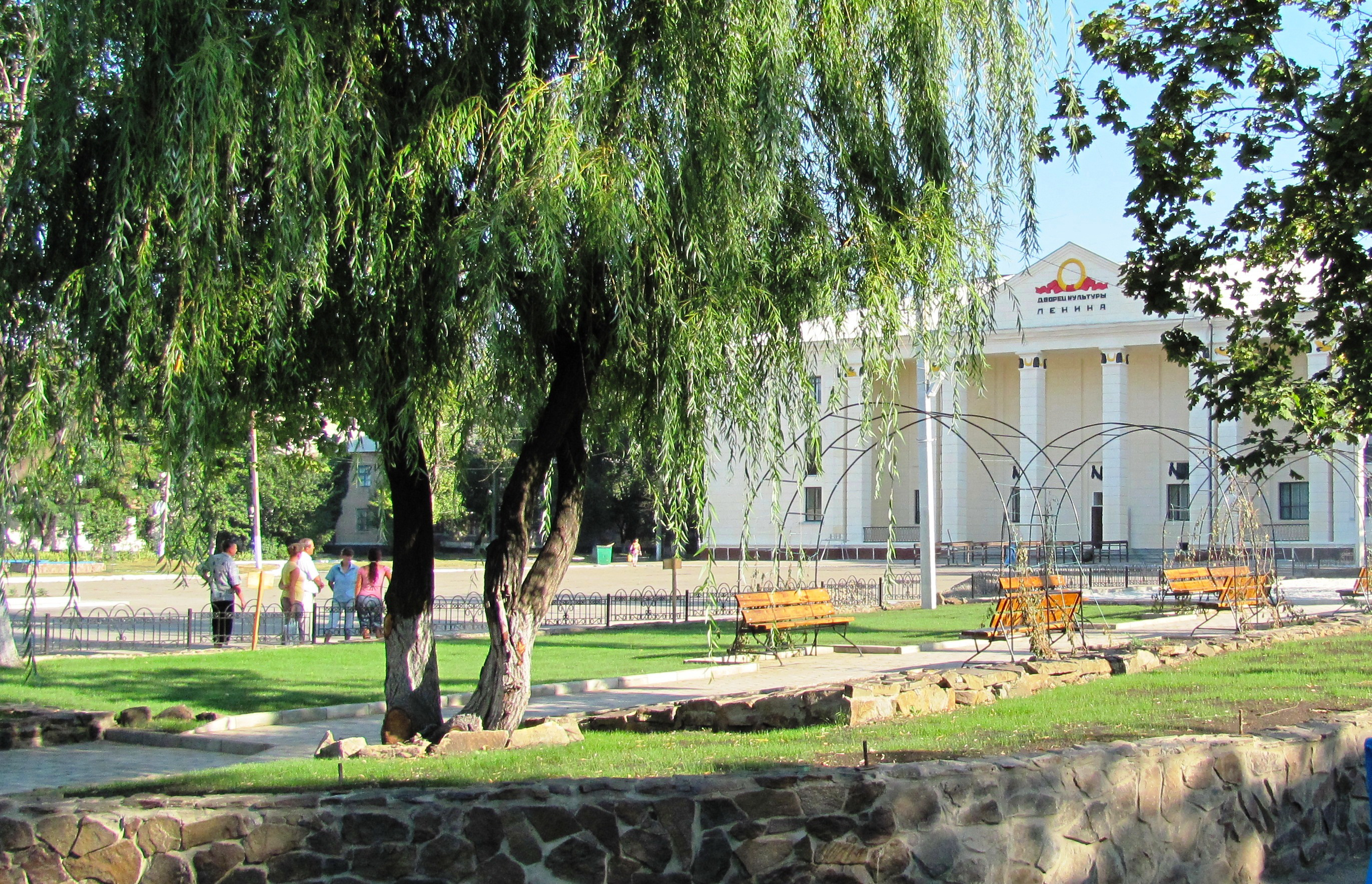
- Palace of Culture

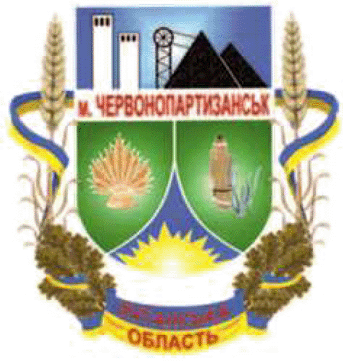
- Flag Coat of arms
- Interactive map of Voznesenivka
- Location within Luhansk Oblast Location within Ukraine
- Country: Ukraine
- Oblast: Luhansk Oblast
- Raion: Dovzhansk Raion
- Hromada: Dovzhansk urban hromada

Population (2022)
  - Total: 15,218
- Area code: (+380)
- Vehicle registration: BB / 13
- Climate: Dfb

Voznesenivka (Ukrainian: Вознесенівка, IPA: [wɔzneˈsɛnʲiu̯kɐ]) or Chervonopartyzansk (Ukrainian: Червонопартизанськ; Russian: Червонопартизанск) is a city in Dovzhansk urban hromada, Dovzhansk Raion (district) of Luhansk Oblast in Ukraine. Population: 15,218 (2022 estimate).

== Geography ==
The city is located in southeastern Luhansk Oblast in the middle of the main Donets drainage divide that separates the watershed of the Velyka Kamianka to the north from watersheds of Kundryucha and Burhusta rivers to the south.

== History ==
=== 20th century ===
In the 1930s, large deposits of anthracite were discovered in the area. The first mine #63 was built during the World War II (1944) and in 1947 Chervonyi Partyzan Coal Mine was founded. Its projected capacity was 2.5 thousands tonnes of fossil fuel per day.

In 1949-1955 next to Chervonyi Partyzan, Provallia #1 and Provallia #2 were built. In 1956, according to Soviet sources these mines yielded 2.3 thousand tonnes of anthracite for Sverdlovskvuhillia Corporation.

In September 1956, Voznesenivka, Novomykolaivka, Krasna Mohyla train station, and a residential neighborhood of the Chervonyi Partyzan Mine united into the urban-type settlement of Chervonopartyzansk. In 1956 more mines were built.

A Komsomol campaign in 1956 brought more than 2,000 young people from Odesa and Chernivtsi Oblasts and Moldavia to build five mines on the northern slope of Burhustyn gulch.

=== 21st century ===
In summer 2014, Chervonopartyzansk was taken over by the Luhansk People's Republic (LPR), an unrecognized breakaway state widely described as a puppet state of the Russian Federation. In July 2014, the city was the scene of fighting during the war in Donbas.

In 2016, while the city was still under LPR control, the city was renamed Voznesenivka by the Ukrainian government due to decommunization reforms.

In September 2021, there was a major fatal accident in the LPR-controlled Chervonyi Partyzan mine. According to Ukrainian human rights activists and Russian state media, while a rope elevator carrying twenty-five miners was being lowered into the mineshaft, the rope snapped, sending the elevator plummeting to the ground. Of the twenty-five miners aboard, nine were killed and the remaining nineteen were injured. The bodies of the dead were recovered to the surface, but the mine was rendered unusable for some time. Human rights activist Pavlo Lisyansky wrote that the mine owners had egregiously ignored safety regulations and exceeded the safe maximum occupancy of twelve by stuffing twenty-five miners into the elevator. He cited trade union sources that said the mine did this to save costs on electricity by avoiding doing two trips with the elevator. Citing preliminary data, Lisyansky said that the cause for the rope snapping was wear and tear of the rope due to repeated overstraining, and that the automatic safety systems that were built in for such a scenario had malfunctioned and not deployed. Denis Kazansky, a Ukrainian journalist from Donetsk, said that the accident was a result of the collapse of the coal industry in Russian-occupied territories of Ukraine due to Russia's occupation of the areas.

== Demographics ==
Ethnic makeup of the population according to the 2001 Ukrainian census:

Ethnic groups in Voznesenivka
	percent
Ukrainians	52.95%
Russians	43.25%
Belarusians	1.27%
Moldovans	0.55%
Tatars	0.51%

== Economy ==
=== Transport ===
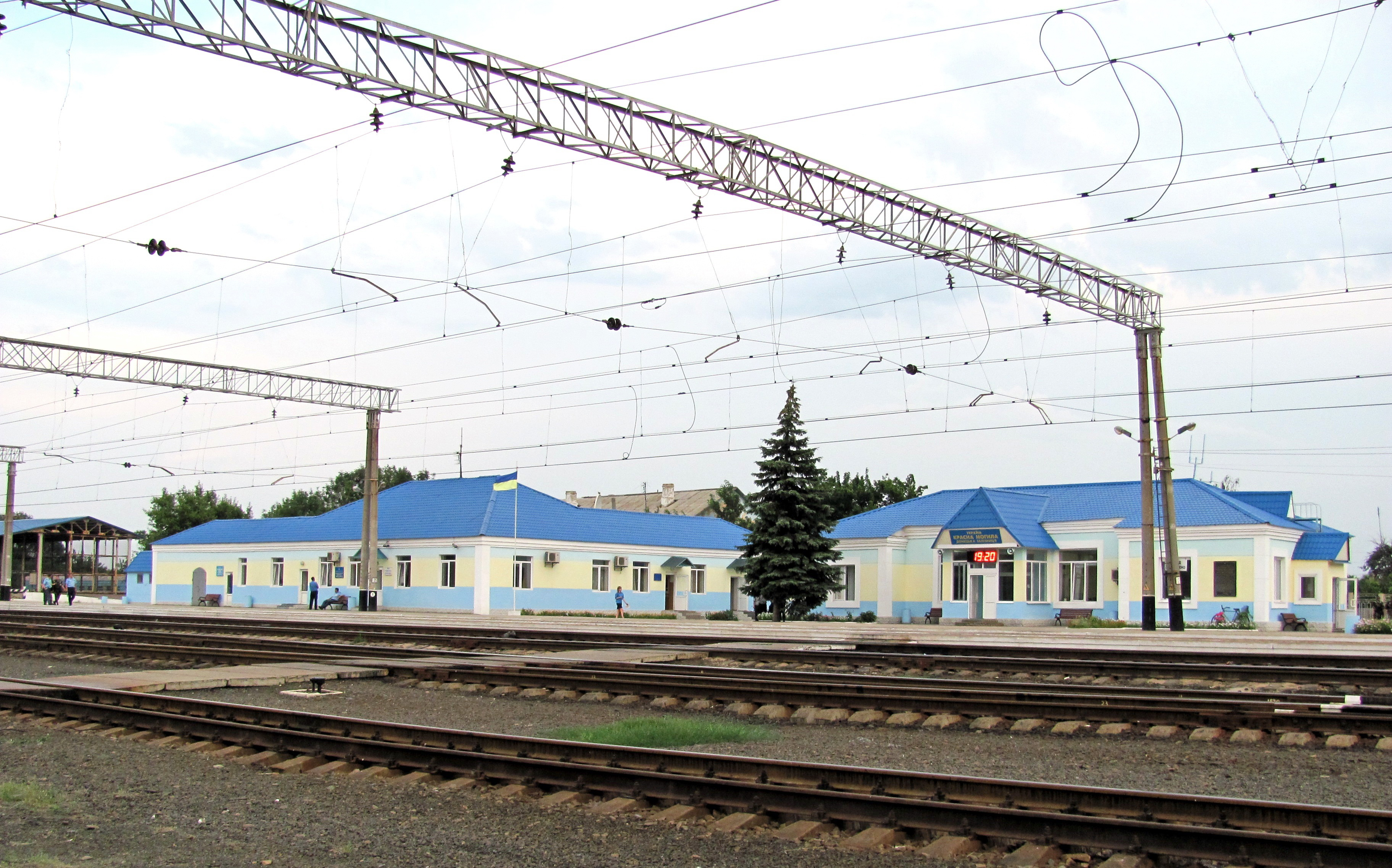
The Krasna Mohyla railway station

To the north the city is passed by Debaltseve–Zverevo railway line. The train station Krasna Mohyla is located within the city limits.
