= Sverdlovsk, Ukraine =

City in Luhansk Oblast, Ukraine

Sverdlovsk Свердловськ (Ukrainian) Свердловськ (Russian) Dovzhansk Довжанськ (Ukrainian)
- City
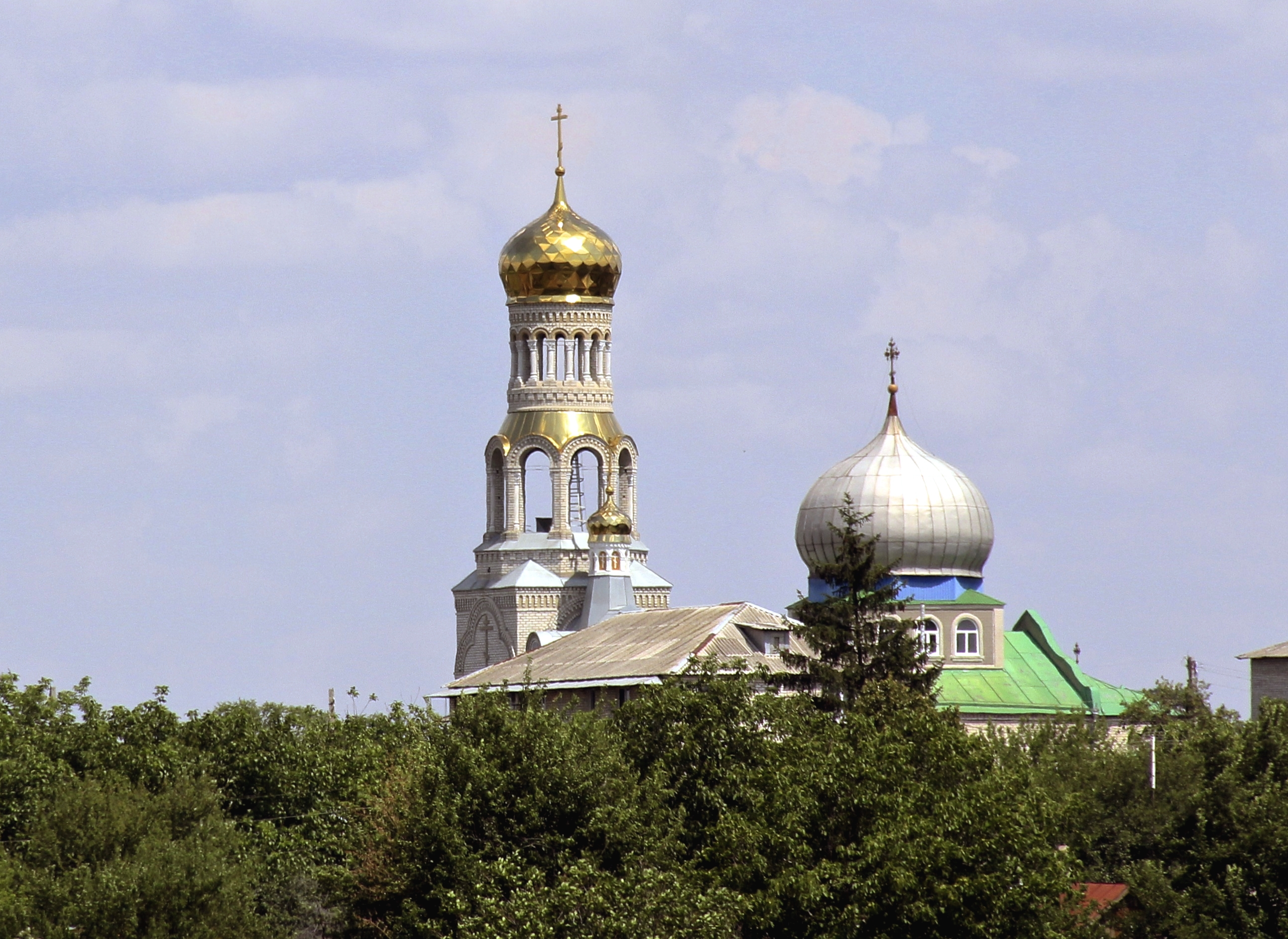
- Saints Peter and Paul church

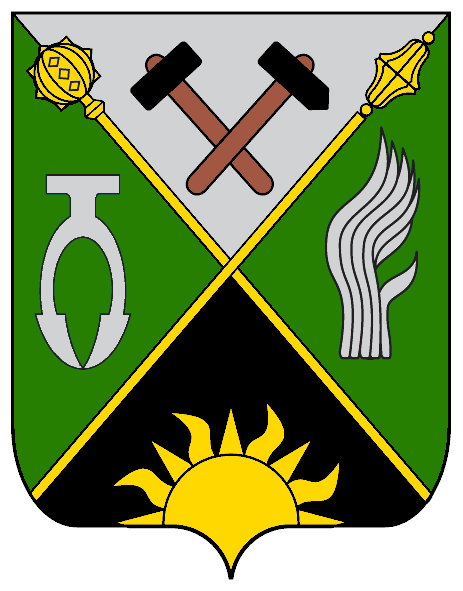
- Flag Coat of arms
- Interactive map of Sverdlovsk
- Location of Sverdlovsk Sverdlovsk (Ukraine)
- Coordinates: 48°04′40″N 39°38′50″E
- Country: Ukraine
- Oblast: Luhansk Oblast
- Raion: Dovzhansk Raion
- Hromada: Dovzhansk urban hromada
- Founded: 1938

Area
  - Total: 83 km^{2} (32 sq mi)
- Elevation: 268 m (879 ft)

Population (2022)
  - Total: 62,691
  - Density: 760/km^{2} (2,000/sq mi)
- Postal code: 94800—94819
- Area code: (+380) 6434
- Vehicle registration: BB / 13
- Climate: Dfb
- Website: https://admsvk.ru/

Sverdlovsk (Ukrainian: Свердловськ; Russian: Свердловск) or Dovzhansk (Ukrainian: Довжанськ) is an industrial city in Luhansk Oblast, in eastern Ukraine, near the internationally recognized border with Russia. This is the residence of Dovzhansk urban hromada and Dovzhansk Raion (district). It is located approximately 80 kilometres (50 mi) from the administrative center of the oblast, Luhansk. Its population is estimated to be 62,691 (2022 estimate).

Sverdlovsk has its origins in several mining settlements that appeared in the late 18th century and 19th century. They were united into a single city in 1938, which grew over time despite destructive occupation by Nazi Germany during World War II. It has been controlled by the Luhansk People's Republic since 2014 and unilaterally annexed by Russia in 2022.

== History ==
=== Early history ===
The city has its origins in a settlement named Dovzhykove-Orlovskе that originated in the late 18th century. It was later renamed to Sharapkyne. The first coal mines in the area began development in the 1870s.

=== 20th century ===
From 1920, it was administratively part of the Donets Governorate of Ukraine.

On 22 October 1938, several of the mining settlements in the area, along with the "Sverdlov" mine, were merged into a new city named Sverdlovsk, named after Bolshevik leader Yakov Sverdlov. The city became the center of Sverdlovsk Raion. A local newspaper began being published in the city in November 1938.

During World War II, Sverdlovsk was occupied by Nazi Germany between 20 July 1942 and 17 February 1943. During the occupation, the Nazis massacred communists and Jews, as well as murdering other civilians for minor infractions. The population waged partisan warfare against the occupiers. As the Nazis retreated from the settlement, they burned down and blew up several buildings, and kidnapped 4,500 people to Germany for forced labor.

In 1962, Sverdlovsk was designated as a city of oblast significance; while it still served as the administrative center of Sverdlovsk Raion, it was no longer part of it, and was instead subordinated directly to Luhansk Oblast.

=== 21st century ===
On 4 June 2014, at the beginning of the war in Donbas, militants proclaiming loyalty to the Russian-backed separatist Luhansk People's Republic (LPR) seized control of the border guards' base at Sverdlovsk, as well as taking over the city itself. The Luhansk People's Republic and Donetsk People's Republic, both considered proxies of Russia, went on to seize large swathes of eastern Ukraine. Using August 2014 footage from occupied Sverdlovsk, investigators identified a Russian tank in one of the separatist columns that "only have come from across the border in Russia", confirming direct Russian involvement in the war.

On 22 August the same year, it was discovered that the LPR authorities in Sverdlovsk - as well as Chervonopartyzansk and other nearby settlements - had forbidden shops owned by people who held pro-Ukrainian views from selling bread. Residents of the settlements began making a petition to end this practice, calling the bans on selling food "genocide". On 23 August, a group of Russian "humanitarian" trucks arrived with packets of salt and water. However, the trucks were reportedly "half-empty", and the salt packets had unusual prices. On 11 September 2014, it was reported that in the past month, sixteen people in Sverdlovsk had died of starvation in what Ukrainian media called a "famine in Donbas". Elderly people with disabilities living on their own were particularly at risk of starvation, now that social services were unable to access the city. On 24 September, Information Resistance coordinator Dmytro Tymchuk reported that the Russian military, who had been fighting alongside the LPR militants in the war, were using an abandoned mine in Sverdlovsk as an impromptu mass grave for its dead soldiers in an attempt to hide casualties and obscure its role in the war.

On 4 October 2014, there was a "hunger riot" in Sverdlovsk in protest against the LPR, citing lack of payment of wages, lack of food, the collapse of the baking system, and widespread looting and robbery. Unknown people threw grenades at the organizers of the protests. This came in the wake of larger-scale "hunger riots" throughout occupied Luhansk Oblast. On 17 November 2014, a second, larger-scale rally broke out in protest of the occupation. People poured blue and yellow paint (the national colors of Ukraine) over the gate of an administrative building and threatened the militants. The militants fired automatic weapons in an attempt to disperse the rally, but this failed. About 2,000 people were taking place in the rally, and they called for the separatists to leave the city, and chanted "Sverdlovsk is Ukraine!" By 18 November, activists reported that 64 people in the city had now died of starvation.

In 2016, Sverdlovsk was renamed Dovzhansk and Sverdlovsk Raion was renamed to Dovzhansk Raion by the Ukrainian government as a result of decommunization laws. In 2020, the designation of a city of oblast significance was abolished across Ukraine, and Dovzhansk has since been officially subordinated to Dovzhansk Raion.

On 21 August 2022, during the full-scale Russian invasion of Ukraine, Luhansk Oblast governor Serhiy Haidai reported that the LPR authorities had forcibly conscripted 430 mine workers in Dovzhansk. According to Russian state TV, only women and the elderly were left to work the mines. Systematic abduction of children has taken place in the city, with 200 children being taken to camps in Krasnodar Krai in Russia for "patriotic training" on 17 August 2023.

== Economy ==
Sverdlovsk is an industrial city. It has twelve mines and four coal enrichment plants, as well as metalworking and machine-building industries. There are repair shops for mining equipment and a clothes factory.

== Demographics ==
Population history
Year	Pop.	±% p.a.
1939	37,000	—
2001	72,531	+1.09%
2013	65,276	−0.87%
2022	62,691	−0.45%

As of the 2001 census, the city's population was 72,531. Its ethnic composition was as follows:

- Russians: 48.6%
- Ukrainians: 46%
- Belarusians: 1.2%
- Others: 2.4%

== Gallery ==
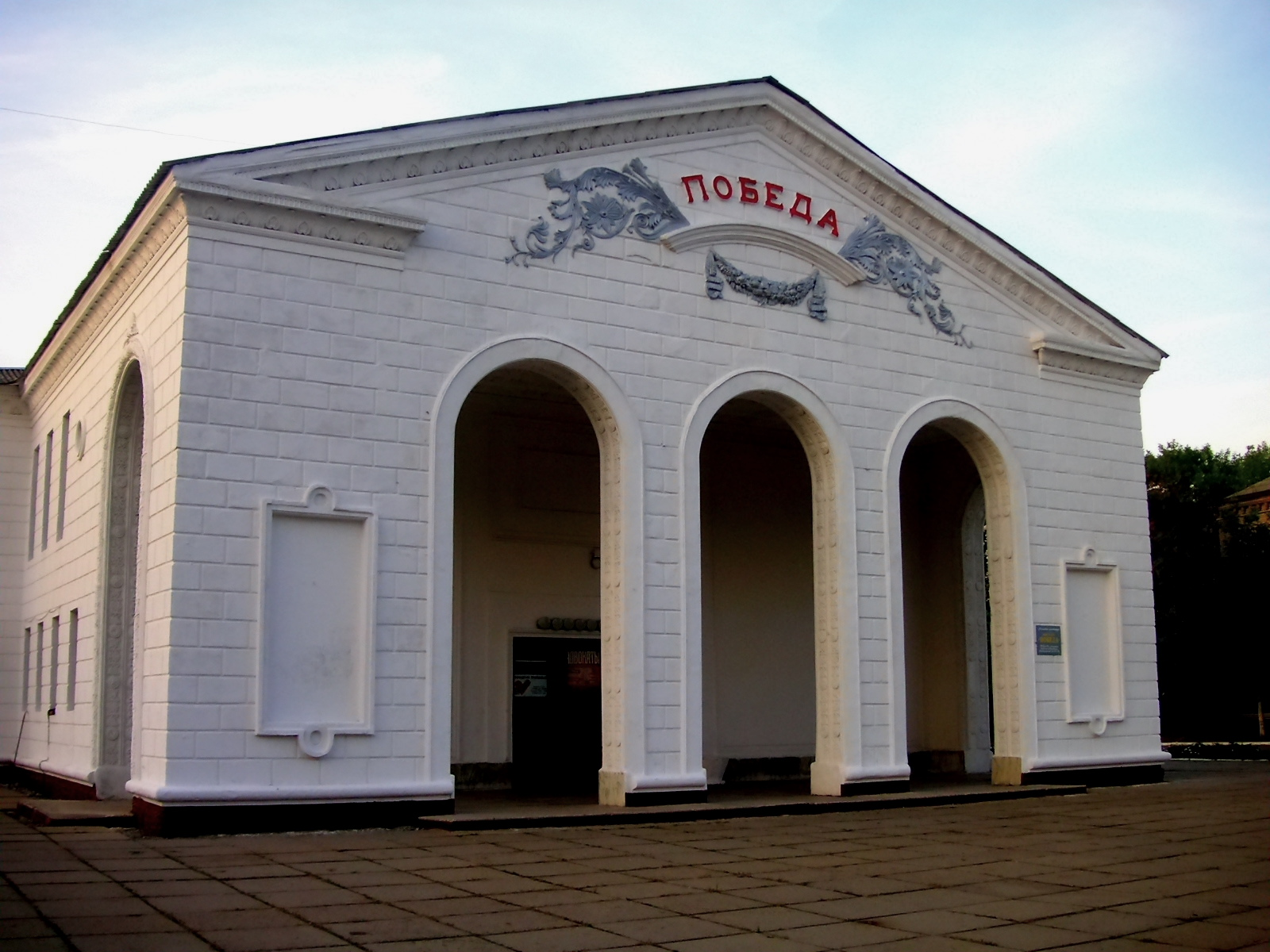
"Victory" cinema

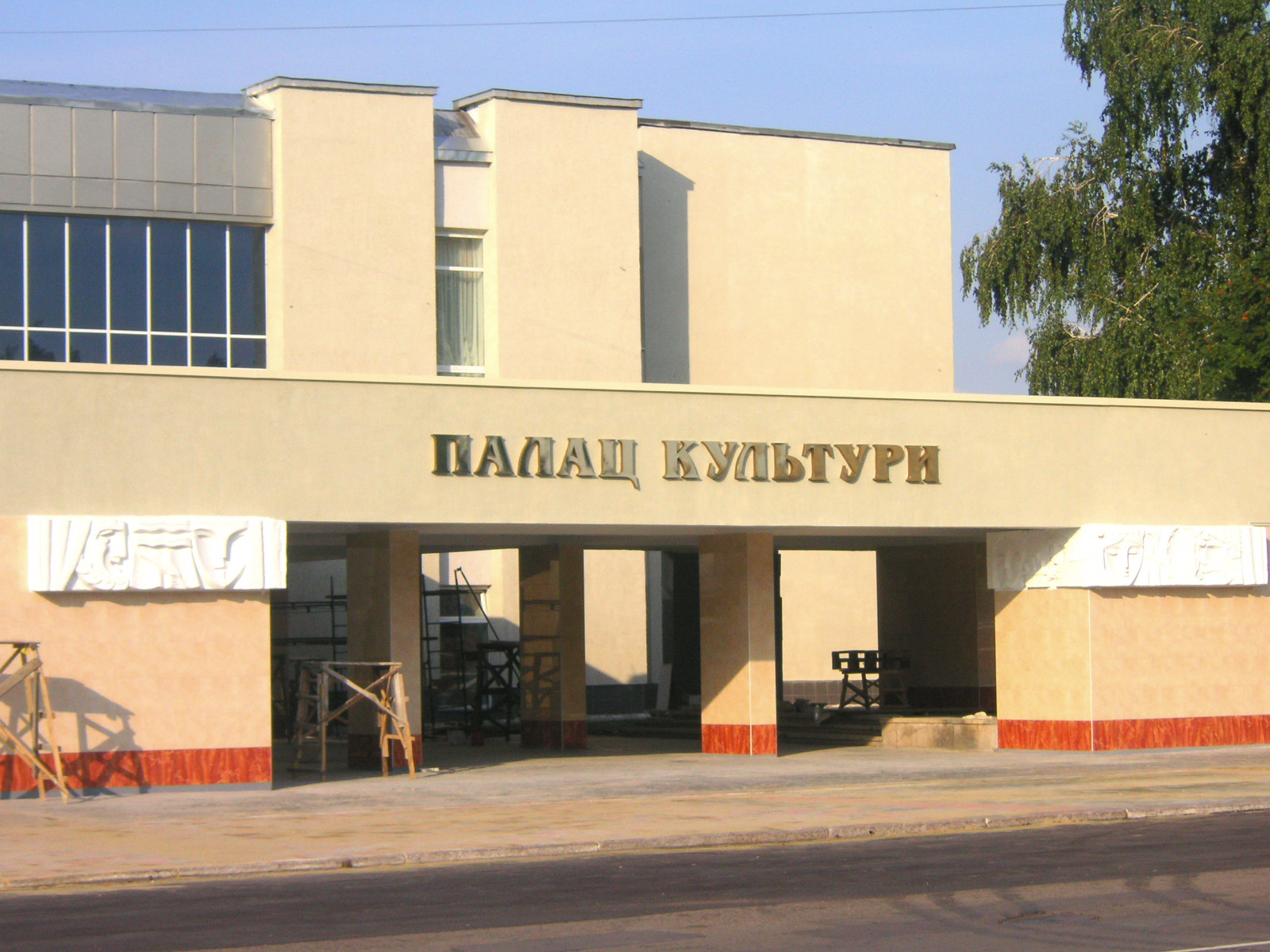
Palace of Culture

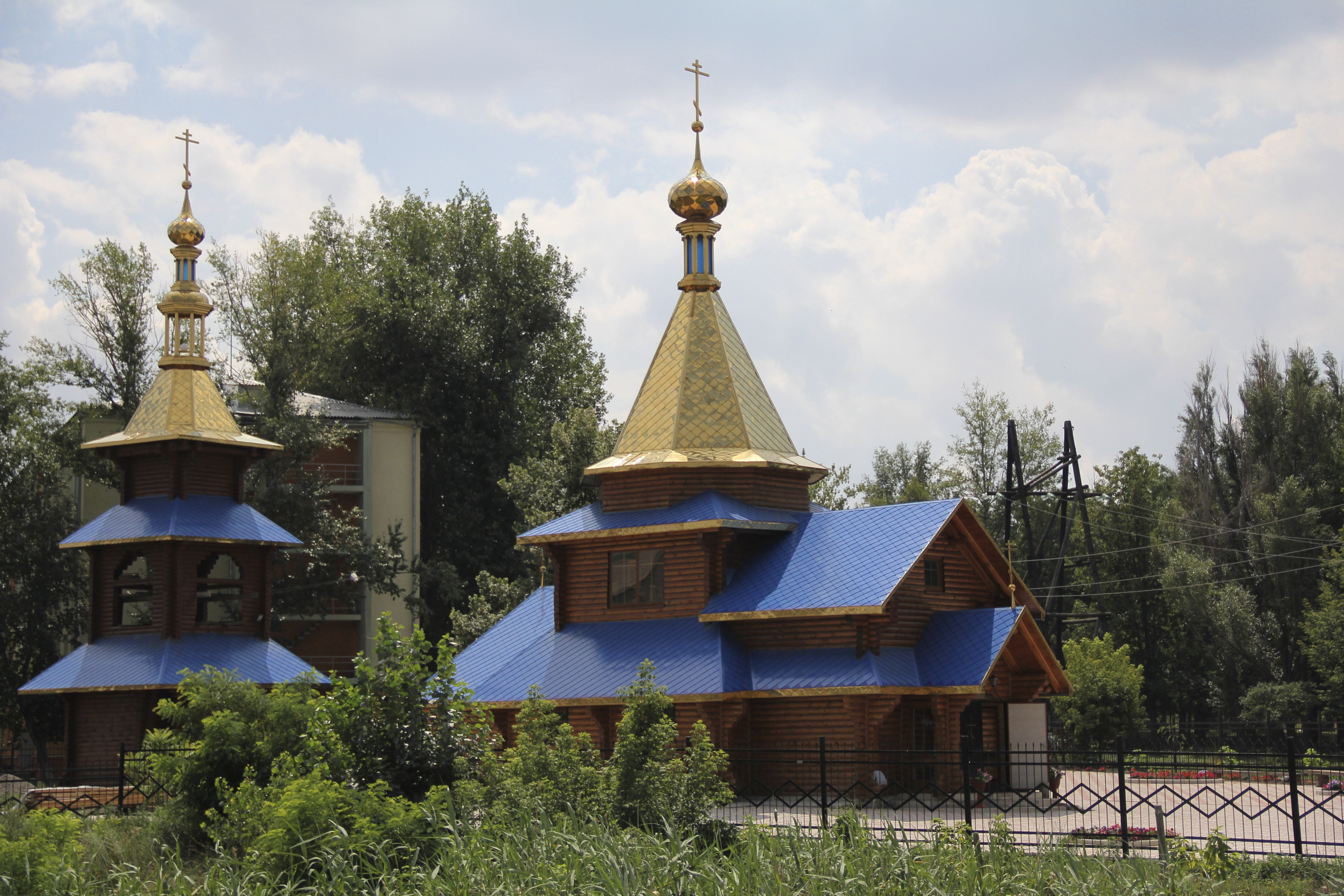
Saint Agapetus church

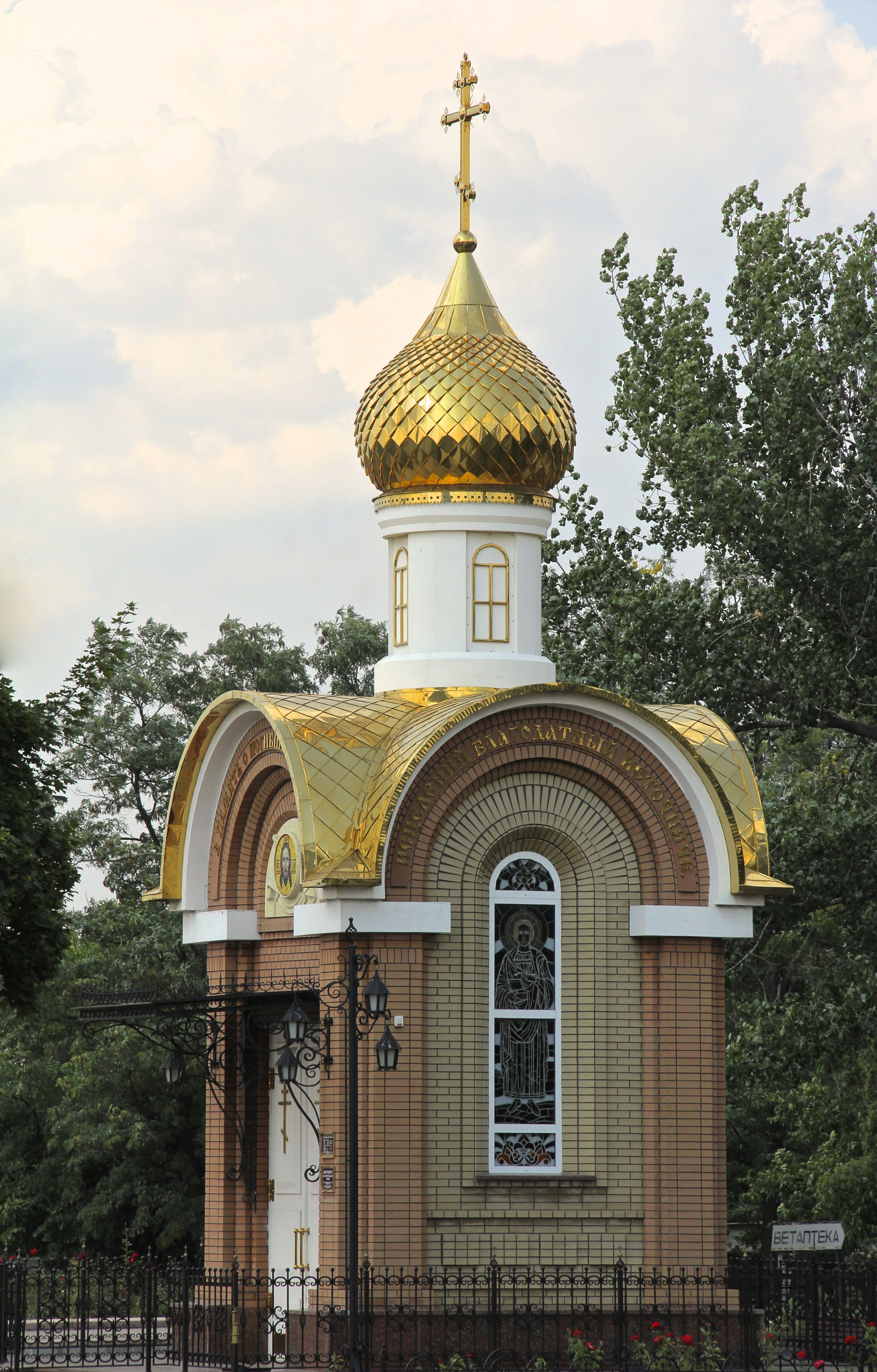
Chapel of Saint Barbara

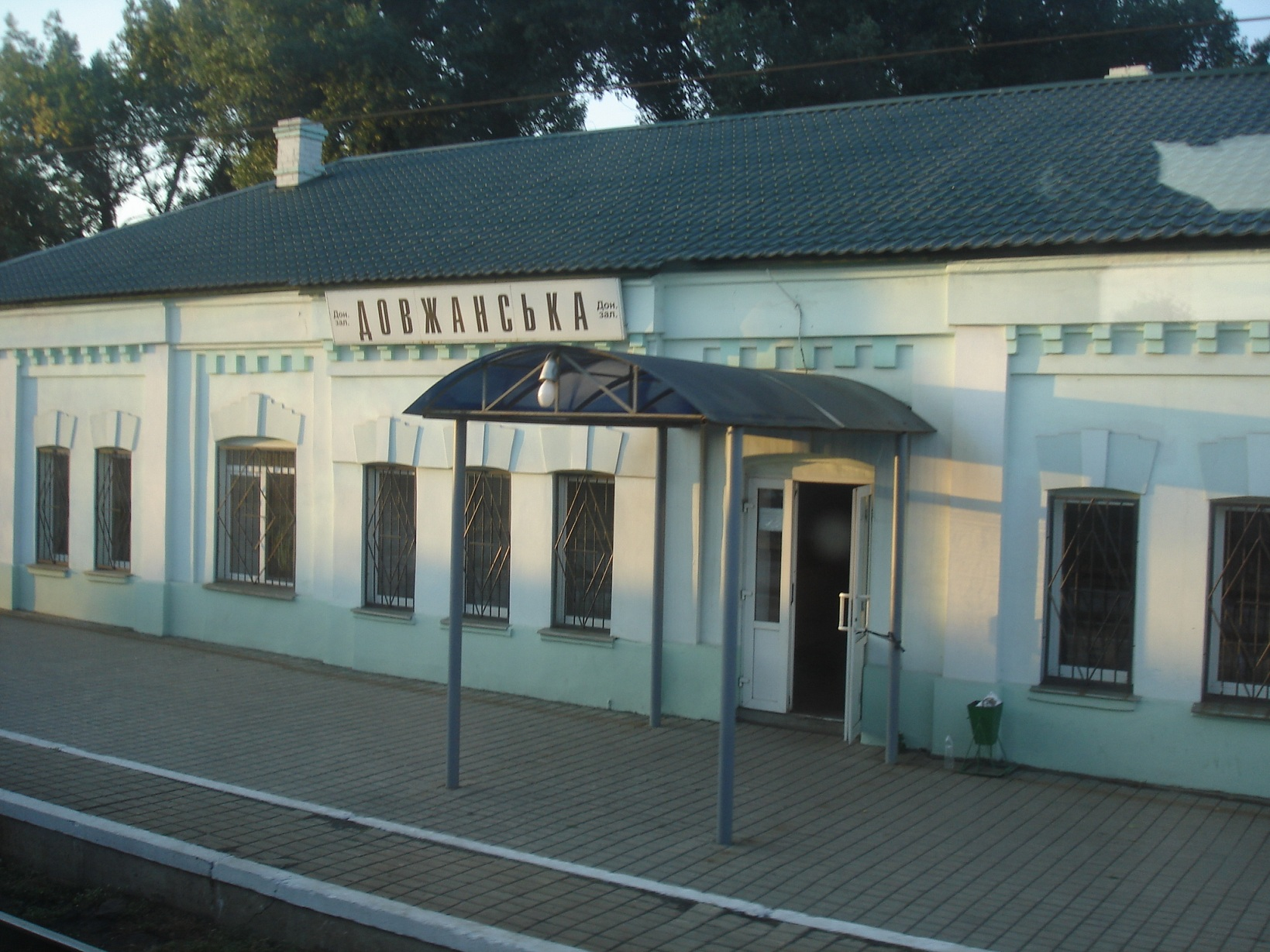
Dovzhanska Train Station

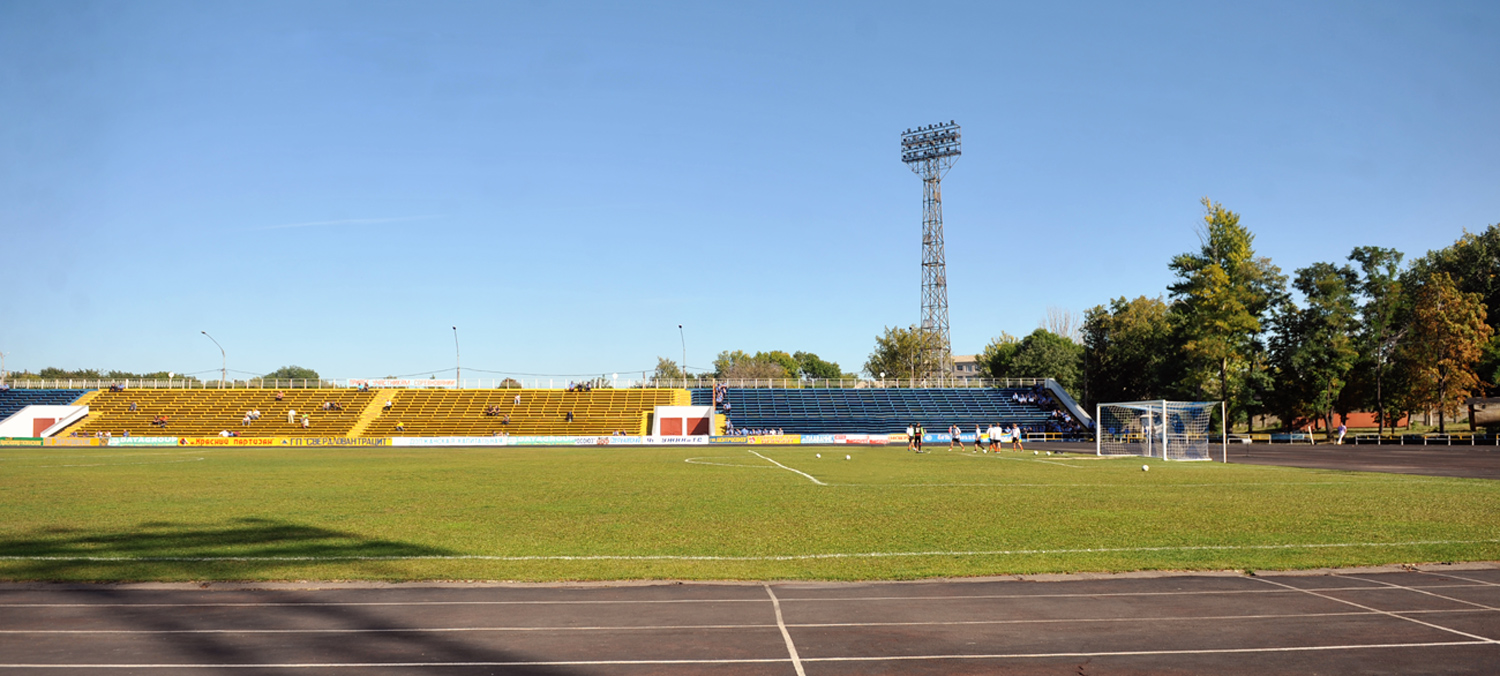
City stadium
