= Dovzhansk Raion =

Subdivision of Luhansk Oblast, Ukraine

Dovzhansk Raion Довжанський район
- Raion
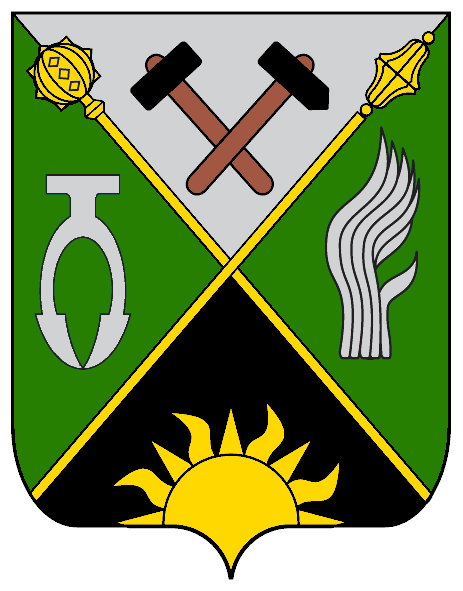
- Flag Coat of arms
- Interactive map of Dovzhansk Raion
- Country: Ukraine
- Oblast: Luhansk Oblast
- Established: 2020
- Admin. center: Dovzhansk (Sverdlovsk)
- Subdivisions: 2 hromadas

Area
  - Total: 2,139 km^{2} (826 sq mi)

Population (2022)
  - Total: 205,465
  - Density: 96.06/km^{2} (248.8/sq mi)

Sverdlovsk Municipal District Свердловський район (Russian)
- District

Other transcription(s)
  - Ukrainian: Свердловський район
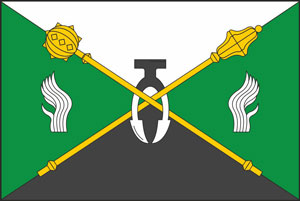
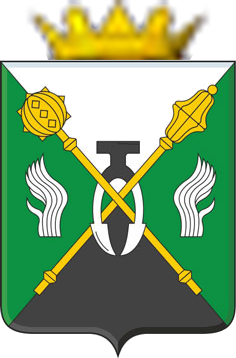
- Flag Coat of arms

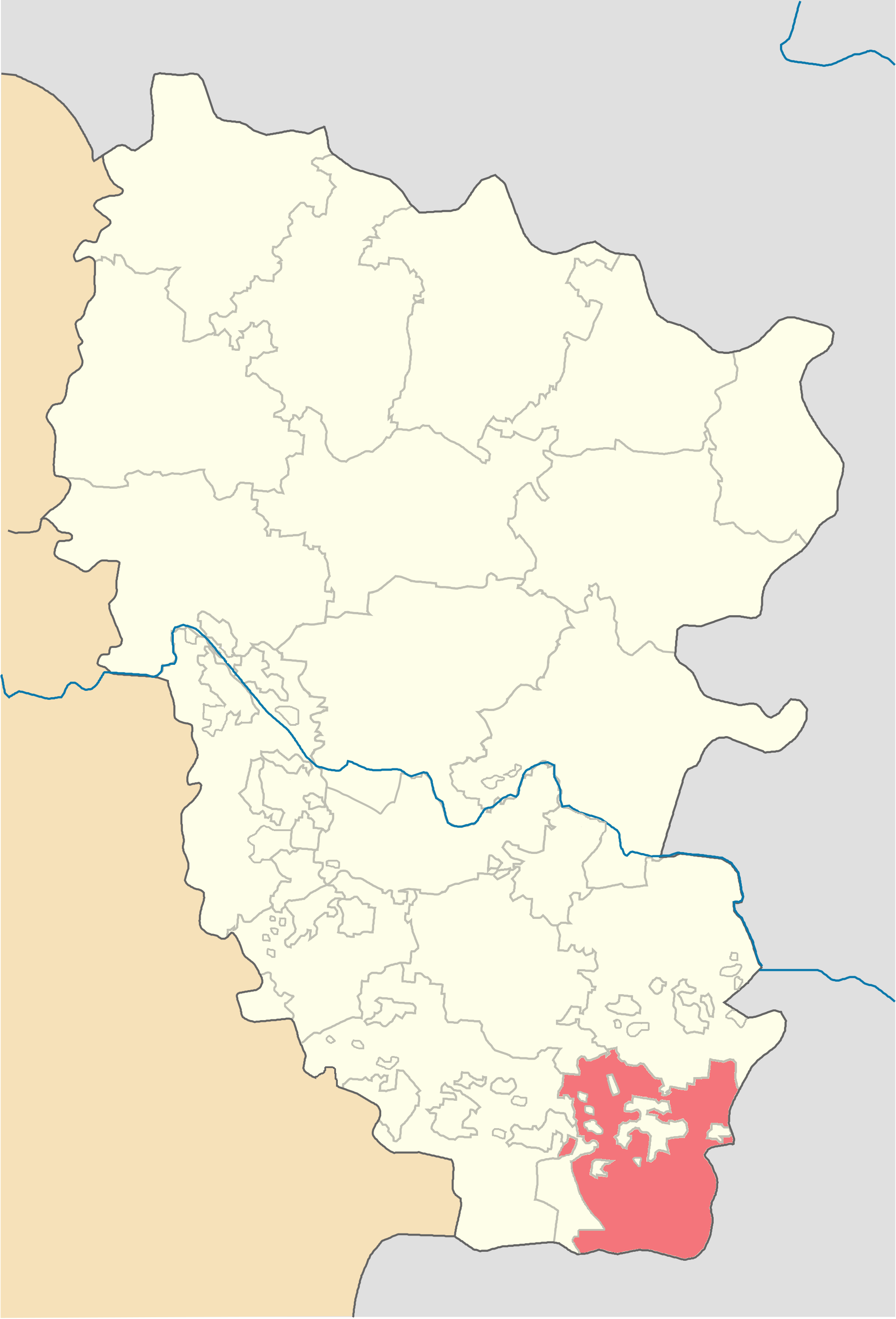
- Location of Sverdlovsk District in the Luhansk Oblast, Ukraine
- Coordinates: 48°12′32″N 39°41′55″E
- Country: Russia
- Federal subject: Luhansk People's Republic
- Established: 1938
- Administrative center: Sverdlovsk

Area
  - Total: 2,139 km^{2} (826 sq mi)
- Website: https://admsvk.ru

Dovzhansk Raion (Ukrainian: Довжанський район; Russian: Должанский район) or Sverdlovsk Raion (Ukrainian: Свердловський район) is a raion (district) in Luhansk Oblast in eastern Ukraine. The administrative center of the raion is the city of Sverdlovsk, Population: 205,465 (2022 estimate). which is incorporated separately as a city of oblast significance and does not belong to the raion. The last estimates of the population of the raion, reported by the Ukrainian government, were 11,644 (2020 est.); 12,039 (2013 est.).

The area of the raion is controlled by Russia, which continues to use the pre-2020 administrative divisions of Ukraine.

== History ==
Sverdlovsk Raion was created in 1938, soon after the founding of Sverdlovsk itself by the amalgamation of several local mining villages. In 1962, Sverdlovsk was designated as a city of oblast significance; while it still served as the administrative center of Sverdlovsk Raion, it was no longer part of it, and was instead subordinated directly to Luhansk Oblast. Portions of the raion were also split off and transferred to Krasnodon Raion and Antratsyt Raion.

Territories of Luhansk Oblast have been the subject of fighting by Russian and Russian-controlled militias since 2014. In 2015 a more-or-less stable line of contact was established after the Minsk II ceasefire agreement and conclusion of the battle of Debaltseve, placing the raion on the Russian side (as part of the Luhansk People's Republic), and then directly after the 2022 annexation of four partially occupied Ukrainian oblasts.

In 2016, the Verkhovna Rada renamed Sverdlovsk to Dovzhansk and Sverdlovsk Raion to Dovzhansk Raion, in accordance with the decommunization law, prohibiting the names of Communist origin. On 18 July 2020 as part of the administrative reform of Ukraine, which reduced the number of raions of Luhansk Oblast to eight, the raion was abolished and reformed as a new Dovzhansk Raion, with its territory significantly extended. Russia continues to use the old name and the old area of the raion.

== Population ==
=== Demographics ===
As of the 2001 Ukrainian census:

Ethnicity

- Ukrainians: 69.9%
- Russians: 25.9%
- Belarusians: 0.6%

== Subdivisions ==
The raion contains two hromadas:

- Dovzhansk urban hromada, with its center in the city Sverdlovsk (Dovzhansk)
- Sorokyne urban hromada, with its center in the city Krasnodon (Sorokyne)
