= List of Ukrainian place names affected by decommunization =

According to the Law of Ukraine No. 317-VIII "About condemning Communist and National-Socialist (Nazi) totalitarian regimes in Ukraine and banning propaganda of their symbols", names of over 3% of populated places in Ukraine are subjected to change.

== Legends and legal references ==
The following are a series of resolutions that the Verkhovna Rada of Ukraine has passed regarding decommunization through the renaming of populated places:

- Resolution (RVRU) 984-VIII, adopted 4 February 2016, entered into force on 18 February 2016
- Resolution (RVRU) 1037-VIII, adopted 17 March 2016, entered into force on 2 April 2016
- Resolution (RVRU) 1351-VIII, adopted 12 May 2016, entered into force on 22 May 2016
- Resolution (RVRU) 1352-VIII, adopted 12 May 2016, entered into force on 7 September 2023
- Resolution (RVRU) 1353-VIII, adopted 12 May 2016, entered into force on 22 May 2016
- Resolution (RVRU) 1374-VIII, adopted 19 May 2016, entered into force on 3 June 2016
- Resolution (RVRU) 1377-VIII, adopted 19 May 2016, entered into force on 3 June 2016
administrative units and populated places located on temporarily occupied territories
administrative units partially located on temporarily occupied territories

Status of populated places:

- underlined centers of oblasts (regions)
- bold marked centers of raions (districts; pre-2020 reform)
- italic marked centers of hromadas (communities; for hromadas where scheduled elections already took place)

Note: names of administrative units to which are subordinated other administrative units or populated places indicated as of 1 January 2016.

== Administrative units ==
=== Oblasts ===
Since the oblasts' (regions') names in Ukraine are prescribed in the Constitution, renaming changes should be made to the Constitution first.

Old name	Status	New name	References
Dnipropetrovsk Oblast	Constitutional Court Rule	Sicheslav Oblast (pending)	
Kirovohrad Oblast	Constitutional Court Rule	Kropyvnytskyi Oblast (pending)	

=== Raions ===
Renamed raions
Old name	Oblast	New name	References
Dnipropetrovsk Raion	Dnipropetrovsk	Dnipro Raion	(RVRU) 1377-VIII
Artemivsk Raion	Donetsk	Bakhmut Raion	(RVRU) 984-VIII
Volodarske Raion	Donetsk	Nikolske Raion	(RVRU) 1353-VIII
Krasnoarmiisk Raion	Donetsk	Pokrovsk Raion	(RVRU) 1353-VIII
Krasnyi Lyman Raion	Donetsk	Lyman Raion	(RVRU) 1377-VIII
Pershotravneve Raion	Donetsk	Manhush Raion	(RVRU) 1377-VIII
Telmanove Raion	Donetsk	Boikivske Raion	(RVRU) 1351-VIII
Volodarsk-Volynskyi Raion	Zhytomyr	Khoroshiv Raion	(RVRU) 1353-VIII
Chervonoarmiisk Raion	Zhytomyr	Pulyny Raion	(RVRU) 1377-VIII
Kuibysheve Raion	Zaporizhzhia	Bilmak Raion	(RVRU) 1353-VIII
Kirovohrad Raion	Kirovohrad	Kropyvnytskyi Raion	(RVRU) 2615-VIII
Ulianovka Raion	Kirovohrad	Blahovishchenske Raion	(RVRU) 1377-VIII
Krasnodon Raion	Luhansk	Sorokyne Raion	(RVRU) 1351-VIII
Sverdlovsk Raion	Luhansk	Dovzhansk Raion	(RVRU) 1351-VIII
Zhovtneve Raion	Mykolaiv	Vitovka Raion	(RVRU) 1377-VIII
Kominternivske Raion	Odesa	Lyman Raion	(RVRU) 1465-VIII
Kotovsk Raion	Odesa	Podilsk Raion	(RVRU) 1353-VIII
Krasni Okny Raion	Odesa	Okny Raion	(RVRU) 1377-VIII
Frunzivka Raion	Odesa	Zakharivka Raion	(RVRU) 1377-VIII
Tsiurupynsk Raion	Kherson	Oleshky Raion	(RVRU) 1377-VIII
Shchors Raion	Chernihiv	Snovsk Raion	(RVRU) 1353-VIII

Raions renamed by Parliament of Ukraine, with new names de facto not yet in force due to the Russo-Ukrainian War (See also: Russian-occupied territories of Ukraine):
Old name	Region/AR Crimea	New name	References
Kirovske Raion	AR Crimea	Isliam-Terek Raion	(RVRU) 1352-VIII
Krasnohvardiiske Raion	AR Crimea	Kurman Raion	(RVRU) 1352-VIII
Krasnoperekopsk Raion	AR Crimea	Perekop Raion	(RVRU) 1352-VIII
Lenine Raion	AR Crimea	Yedy-Kuiu Raion	(RVRU) 1352-VIII
Sovietskyi Raion	AR Crimea	Ichki Raion	(RVRU) 1352-VIII

== Cities, villages ==
=== Autonomous Republic of Crimea ===
The Autonomous Republic of Crimea is administered by the Russian Federation due to the 2014 Russian annexation of Crimea.

The Ministry of Temporarily Occupied Territories and Internally displaced persons is a government ministry in Ukraine that was officially established on 20 April 2016 to manage occupied parts of Donetsk, Luhansk and Crimea regions affected by Russian military intervention of 2014.

Type	Old name	Raion	New name	References
urban-type settlement	Kuibysheve	Bakhchysarai Raion	Albat	ПВРУ 1352-VIII
village	Novoulianovka	Bakhchysarai Raion	Otarchyk	ПВРУ 1352-VIII
village	Furmanovka	Bakhchysarai Raion	Aktachy	ПВРУ 1352-VIII
village	Udarne	Bilohirsk Raion	Bochala	ПВРУ 1352-VIII
village	Ulianovka	Bilohirsk Raion	Sultan-Sarai	ПВРУ 1352-VIII
village	Zavit-Leninskyi	Dzhankoi Raion	Kuchuk-Alkaly	ПВРУ 1352-VIII
village	Komsomolske	Dzhankoi Raion	Orak-Adzhy	ПВРУ 1352-VIII
village	Laryne	Dzhankoi Raion	Zhytomyrske	ПВРУ 1352-VIII
village	Oktiabr	Dzhankoi Raion	Bai-Konchek	ПВРУ 1352-VIII
village	Ostrovske	Dzhankoi Raion	Tarkhan-Sunak	ПВРУ 1352-VIII
village	Sovietske	Dzhankoi Raion	Mishen-Naiman	ПВРУ 1352-VIII
village	Subotnyk	Dzhankoi Raion	Konurcha	ПВРУ 1352-VIII
village	Udarne	Dzhankoi Raion	Dzharda-Sheikh-Eli	ПВРУ 1352-VIII
village	Kalinine	Krasnohvardiiske Raion	Umiut	ПВРУ 1352-VIII
urban-type settlement	Kirovske	Kirovske Raion	Isliam-Terek	ПВРУ 1352-VIII
village	Komunary	Krasnohvardiiske Raion	Irade	ПВРУ 1352-VIII
village	Krasnyi Partyzan	Krasnohvardiiske Raion	Boranhar	ПВРУ 1352-VIII
urban-type settlement	Krasnohvardiiske	Krasnohvardiiske Raion	Kurman	ПВРУ 1352-VIII
village	Krasnoznamianka	Krasnohvardiiske Raion	Staryi Mlyn	ПВРУ 1352-VIII
village	Leninske	Krasnohvardiiske Raion	Kyr-Bailar	ПВРУ 1352-VIII
urban-type settlement	Oktiabrske	Krasnohvardiiske Raion	Biiuk-Onlar	ПВРУ 1352-VIII
village	Ulianovka	Krasnohvardiiske Raion	Davchy	ПВРУ 1352-VIII
village	Chapaieve	Krasnohvardiiske Raion	Neishprotsunh	ПВРУ 1352-VIII
village	Krasnoarmiiske	Krasnoperekopsk Raion	Myrza-Koiash	ПВРУ 1352-VIII
village	Proletarka	Krasnoperekopsk Raion	As	ПВРУ 1352-VIII
village	Sovkhozne	Krasnoperekopsk Raion	Karakul	ПВРУ 1352-VIII
village	Voikove	Lenine Raion	Katyrzel	ПВРУ 1352-VIII
village	Illicheve	Lenine Raion	Kara-Kuiu	ПВРУ 1352-VIII
village	Kirove	Lenine Raion	Karsa	ПВРУ 1352-VIII
urban-type settlement	Lenine	Lenine Raion	Yedy-Kuiu	ПВРУ 1352-VIII
village	Leninske	Lenine Raion	Poltavske	ПВРУ 1352-VIII
village	Libknekhtivka	Lenine Raion	Kytai	ПВРУ 1352-VIII
village	Oktiabrske	Lenine Raion	Melek-Chesme	ПВРУ 1352-VIII
village	Frunze	Nyzhniohirskyi Raion	Biuiten	ПВРУ 1352-VIII
village	Voikove	Pervomaiske Raion	Aibar	ПВРУ 1352-VIII
village	Kalinine	Pervomaiske Raion	Orman-Adzhy	ПВРУ 1352-VIII
village	Oktiabrske	Pervomaiske Raion	Kuchuk-Borash	ПВРУ 1352-VIII
village	Ostrovske	Pervomaiske Raion	Kyiat	ПВРУ 1352-VIII
village	Pravda	Pervomaiske Raion	Der-Emes	ПВРУ 1352-VIII
village	Sverdlovske	Pervomaiske Raion	Devlet-Ali	ПВРУ 1352-VIII
village	Stakhanovka	Pervomaiske Raion	Beshuili-Iliak	ПВРУ 1352-VIII
village	Frunze	Pervomaiske Raion	Biiuk-Borash	ПВРУ 1352-VIII
village	Chapaieve	Pervomaiske Raion	Botash	ПВРУ 1352-VIII
village	Avrora	Rozdolne Raion	Tatysh-Konrat	ПВРУ 1352-VIII
village	Komunarne	Rozdolne Raion	Kereit	ПВРУ 1352-VIII
village	Kotovske	Rozdolne Raion	Biuiten	ПВРУ 1352-VIII
village	Krasnoarmiiske	Rozdolne Raion	Kodzhalak	ПВРУ 1352-VIII
village	Ulianovka	Rozdolne Raion	Tavkel-Naiman	ПВРУ 1352-VIII
village	Frunze	Saky Raion	Bahaily	ПВРУ 1352-VIII
village	Furmanove	Saky Raion	Mamut-Bai	ПВРУ 1352-VIII
village	Shaumian	Saky Raion	Yany-Kiohenesh	ПВРУ 1352-VIII
village	Lazarivka	Simferopol Raion	Bura	ПВРУ 1352-VIII
village	Pionerske	Simferopol Raion	Dzholman	ПВРУ 1352-VIII
village	Sovkhozne	Simferopol Raion	Temyr-Aha	ПВРУ 1352-VIII
village	Illicheve	Sovietskyi Raion	Kyianly	ПВРУ 1352-VIII
village	Krasnohvardiiske	Sovietskyi Raion	Novyi Tsiurikhtal	ПВРУ 1352-VIII
village	Krasnoflotske	Sovietskyi Raion	Kainash	ПВРУ 1352-VIII
village	Oktiabrske	Sovietskyi Raion	Deppar-Yurt	ПВРУ 1352-VIII
urban-type settlement	Sovietskyi	Sovietskyi Raion	Ichki	ПВРУ 1352-VIII
village	Chapaievka	Sovietskyi Raion	Cherkez-Tobai	ПВРУ 1352-VIII
village	Artemivka	Chornomorske Raion	Toka	ПВРУ 1352-VIII
village	Kirovske	Chornomorske Raion	Tarkhankut	ПВРУ 1352-VIII
village	Novoulianovka	Chornomorske Raion	Kop-Aran	ПВРУ 1352-VIII
city	Krasnoperekopsk	Krasnoperekopsk Municipality	Yany Kapu	ПВРУ 1352-VIII
urban-type settlement	Komsomolske	Simferopol Municipality	Bakachyk-Kyiat	ПВРУ 1352-VIII
urban-type settlement	Ordzhonikidze	Feodosia Municipality	Kaihador	ПВРУ 1352-VIII
village	Pionerske	Feodosia Municipality	Hertsenberh	ПВРУ 1352-VIII
selyshche	Kuibysheve	Yalta Municipality	Isar	ПВРУ 1352-VIII
urban-type settlement	Sovietske	Yalta Municipality	Dolossy	ПВРУ 1352-VIII

=== Cherkasy Oblast ===
Type	Old name	Raion	New name	References
selyshche	Nezamozhnyk	Horodyshche Raion	Khrestivka	ПВРУ 1377-VIII
village	Leninske	Drabiv Raion	Bohdanivka	ПВРУ 984-VIII
village	Petrovskoho	Drabiv Raion	Pryvitne	ПВРУ 1353-VIII
selyshche	Radhospne	Drabiv Raion	Kvitneve	ПВРУ 984-VIII
selyshche	Petrovskoho	Zolotonosha Raion	Stepove	ПВРУ 984-VIII
village	Chapaievka	Zolotonosha Raion	Blahodatne	ПВРУ 1353-VIII
selyshche	Petrivske	Kamianka Raion	Lisove	ПВРУ 984-VIII
village	Kirove	Korsun-Shevchenkivskyi Raion	Kornylivka	ПВРУ 1377-VIII
village	Viktorivka	Mankivka Raion	Pomynyk	ПВРУ 1377-VIII
village	Zhovtneve	Monastyryshche Raion	Bubelnia	ПВРУ 1377-VIII
village	Petrivka	Monastyryshche Raion	Kheilove	ПВРУ 1377-VIII
village	Chapaievka	Monastyryshche Raion	Panskyi Mist	ПВРУ 1377-VIII
village	Leninske	Smila Raion	Chubivka	ПВРУ 1377-VIII
selyshche	Zdobutok Zhovtnia	Talne Raion	Zdobutok	ПВРУ 1037-VIII
selyshche	Politviddilovets	Uman Raion	Malyi Zatyshok	ПВРУ 1037-VIII
selyshche	Zhovtneve	Chornobai Raion	Myrne	ПВРУ 1353-VIII
selyshche	Zhovtnevyi Promin	Chornobai Raion	Zhuravlyne	ПВРУ 1353-VIII
selyshche	Komintern	Chornobai Raion	Pryvitne	ПВРУ 1353-VIII
village	Leninske	Chornobai Raion	Stepove	ПВРУ 1353-VIII

=== Chernihiv Oblast ===
Type	Old name	Raion	New name	References
village	Petrivske	Bakhmach Raion	Vyshneve	ПВРУ 1374-VIII
village	Petrovskoho	Bakhmach Raion	Vyshneve	ПВРУ 984-VIII
village	Chervona Zirka	Bakhmach Raion	Zalissia	ПВРУ 984-VIII
village	Dzerzhynskoho	Bobrovytsia Raion	Molodizhne	ПВРУ 1353-VIII
village	Chervonoarmiiske	Bobrovytsia Raion	Vyshneve	ПВРУ 1353-VIII
village	Bilshovyk	Borzna Raion	Zabilivshchyna Druha	ПВРУ 1037-VIII
village	Kirovske	Borzna Raion	Ostriv Nadii	ПВРУ 1353-VIII
village	Petrivka	Borzna Raion	Makhnivka	ПВРУ 1467-VIII
village	Chervona Ukraina	Borzna Raion	Ukrainka	ПВРУ 1353-VIII
village	Chervonyi Oster	Borzna Raion	Oster	ПВРУ 984-VIII
village	Radianske	Horodnia Raion	Sloboda	ПВРУ 1353-VIII
village	Zhovtneve	Ichnia Raion	Nova Olshana	ПВРУ 1377-VIII
village	Proletarske	Ichnia Raion	Boiarshchyna	ПВРУ 1377-VIII
village	Petrivske	Kozelets Raion	Mostyshche	ПВРУ 1377-VIII
village	Zhovtneve	Korop Raion	Rozhdestvenske	ПВРУ 1377-VIII
village	Proletarske	Korop Raion	Poliske	ПВРУ 984-VIII
village	Sverdlovka	Korop Raion	Desnianske	ПВРУ 984-VIII
village	Chervona Poliana	Korop Raion	Poliana	ПВРУ 984-VIII
village	Chervone	Korop Raion	Bylka	ПВРУ 1377-VIII
village	Chervonyi Lan	Korop Raion	Nekryte	ПВРУ 984-VIII
village	Chervonyi Ranok	Korop Raion	Ranok	ПВРУ 1037-VIII
selyshche	Komsomolske	Koriukivka Raion	Dovzhyk	ПВРУ 984-VIII
village	Chervona Buda	Koriukivka Raion	Romanivska Buda	ПВРУ 984-VIII
village	Chervonyi Dovzhyk	Koriukivka Raion	Burkivka	ПВРУ 984-VIII
village	Zhovtneve	Mena Raion	Pokrovske	ПВРУ 1037-VIII
village	Leninivka	Mena Raion	Sakhnivka	ПВРУ 984-VIII
village	Pamiat Lenina	Mena Raion	Zahorivka	ПВРУ 984-VIII
selyshche	Chapaievka	Mena Raion	Sadove	ПВРУ 984-VIII
village	Chervonyi Majak	Mena Raion	Ovcharivka	ПВРУ 984-VIII
village	Chervoni Hory	Mena Raion	Sviati Hory	ПВРУ 984-VIII
village	Chervoni Luky	Mena Raion	Luky	ПВРУ 984-VIII
village	Chervoni Partyzany	Mena Raion	Novi Brody	ПВРУ 984-VIII
village	Hryhorivka	Nizhyn Raion	Mylnyky	ПВРУ 1353-VIII
village	Hryhoro-Ivanivka	Nizhyn Raion	Nizhynske	ПВРУ 1353-VIII
village	Radhospne	Nizhyn Raion	Yabluneve	ПВРУ 1353-VIII
village	Chervonyi Kolodiaz	Nizhyn Raion	Chystyi Kolodiaz	ПВРУ 1377-VIII
village	Chervonyi Shliakh	Nizhyn Raion	Stantsiia Losynivska	ПВРУ 1353-VIII
village	Kirove	Novhorod-Siverskyi Raion	Troitske	ПВРУ 1037-VIII
village	Krasne	Novhorod-Siverskyi Raion	Sapozhkiv Khutir	ПВРУ 984-VIII
village	Zhovten	Nosivka Raion	Lisovi Khutory	ПВРУ 1353-VIII
village	Karla Marksa	Nosivka Raion	Verbove	ПВРУ 1353-VIII
village	Kirovka	Nosivka Raion	Platonivka	ПВРУ 1377-VIII
village	Chervoni Partyzany	Nosivka Raion	Volodkova Divytsia	ПВРУ 1377-VIII
village	Shliakh Illicha	Nosivka Raion	Yablunivka	ПВРУ 1353-VIII
village	Volodymyrivka	Pryluky Raion	Dymyrivka	ПВРУ 1037-VIII
village	Vorovskoho	Pryluky Raion	Svitankove	ПВРУ 1037-VIII
village	Zhovtneve	Pryluky Raion	Dmytrivka	ПВРУ 1037-VIII
village	Komuna	Pryluky Raion	Lisove	ПВРУ 984-VIII
village	Proletarske	Pryluky Raion	Ladivshchyna	ПВРУ 984-VIII
village	Nezamozhne	Ripky Raion	Vertecha	ПВРУ 1353-VIII
village	Proletarska Rudnia	Ripky Raion	Rudnia	ПВРУ 984-VIII
village	Chervona Huta	Ripky Raion	Huta	ПВРУ 984-VIII
village	Zhovtneve	Semenivka Raion	Yanzhulivka	ПВРУ 1353-VIII
village	Pershotravneve	Semenivka Raion	Khandobokivka	ПВРУ 984-VIII
village	Ulianivske	Semenivka Raion	Bronyvy	ПВРУ 1377-VIII
village	Chervonyi Hai	Semenivka Raion	Berezovyi Hai	ПВРУ 984-VIII
village	Chervonyi Pakhar	Semenivka Raion	Lubiane	ПВРУ 1377-VIII
village	Horkoho	Sribne Raion	Antishky	ПВРУ 984-VIII
village	Sylchenkove	Talalaivka Raion	Stara Talalaivka	ПВРУ 1353-VIII
village	Chervonyi Pluhatar	Talalaivka Raion	Pluhatar	ПВРУ 1353-VIII
village	Radianska Sloboda	Chernihiv Raion	Trysviatska Sloboda	ПВРУ 1377-VIII
village	Ulianivka	Chernihiv Raion	Voznesenske	ПВРУ 1037-VIII
village	Chervone	Chernihiv Raion	Zhydynychi	ПВРУ 1353-VIII
city	Shchors	Shchors Raion	Snovsk	ПВРУ 1353-VIII

=== Chernivtsi Oblast ===
Type	Old name	Raion	New name	References
village	Radhospivka	Hertsa Raion	Mamornytsia Vama	ПВРУ 1353-VIII

=== Dnipropetrovsk Oblast ===
Type	Old name	Raion	New name	References
village	Leninske	Apostolove Raion	Hrushivka	ПВРУ 984-VIII
village	Pamiat Illicha	Apostolove Raion	Novoukrainske	ПВРУ 1353-VIII
village	Chervona Zirka	Apostolove Raion	Zoriane	ПВРУ 1353-VIII
village	Internatsionalne	Vasylkivka Raion	Dovhe	ПВРУ 1037-VIII
village	Kirovske	Vasylkivka Raion	Tykhe	ПВРУ 1037-VIII
village	Petrivske	Vasylkivka Raion	Babakove	ПВРУ 1037-VIII
village	Proletarske	Vasylkivka Raion	Morozivske	ПВРУ 1037-VIII
village	Karla Marksa	Verkhniodniprovsk Raion	Saksahan	ПВРУ 1353-VIII
urban-type settlement	Kirovske	Dnipropetrovsk Raion	Obukhivka	ПВРУ 1377-VIII
village	Ordzhonikidze	Dnipropetrovsk Raion	Novotaromske	ПВРУ 1377-VIII
urban-type settlement	Yuvileine	Dnipropetrovsk Raion	Slobozhanske	ПВРУ 1353-VIII
village	Valove	Kryvyi Rih Raion	Sofiivka	ПВРУ 1377-VIII
village	Kalinina	Kryvyi Rih Raion	Kalynivka	ПВРУ 1353-VIII
village	Kirove	Kryvyi Rih Raion	Lisove	ПВРУ 1353-VIII
village	Kirovka	Kryvyi Rih Raion	Danylivka	ПВРУ 1377-VIII
village	Krasine	Kryvyi Rih Raion	Krasivkse	ПВРУ 1037-VIII
village	Lenina	Kryvyi Rih Raion	Sadove	ПВРУ 1353-VIII
village	Ordzhonikidze	Kryvyi Rih Raion	Shevchenkivske	ПВРУ 1353-VIII
village	Radhospne	Kryvyi Rih Raion	Nadia	ПВРУ 1377-VIII
village	Chapaievka	Kryvyi Rih Raion	Stepove	ПВРУ 1353-VIII
village	Zhovtneve	Krynychky Raion	Saksahanske	ПВРУ 1377-VIII
village	Kimovka	Krynychky Raion	Cherkaske	ПВРУ 1353-VIII
village	Kirovka	Krynychky Raion	Kruta Balka	ПВРУ 1377-VIII
village	Lenina	Krynychky Raion	Kozache	ПВРУ 1353-VIII
village	Oktiabrske	Krynychky Raion	Ukrainske	ПВРУ 1353-VIII
village	Chapaievka	Krynychky Raion	Lozuvatske	ПВРУ 1377-VIII
village	Chervona Ukrainka	Krynychky Raion	Maliarshchyna	ПВРУ 1377-VIII
village	Chervonyi Prapor	Krynychky Raion	Prapor	ПВРУ 1353-VIII
village	Chervonyi Promin	Krynychky Raion	Promin	ПВРУ 1377-VIII
urban-type settlement	Shchorsk	Krynychky Raion	Bozhedarivka	ПВРУ 984-VIII
village	Karla Marksa	Mahdalynivka Raion	Kalynivka	ПВРУ 1037-VIII
village	Novoproletarske	Mahdalynivka Raion	Zoriane	ПВРУ 1353-VIII
selyshche	Proletarske	Mahdalynivka Raion	Pryorilske	ПВРУ 1353-VIII
village	Radianske	Mahdalynivka Raion	Kilchen	ПВРУ 1037-VIII
village	Krasnoznamianka	Mezhova Raion	Biliakivka	ПВРУ 1374-VIII
village	Leninske	Mezhova Raion	Stepove	ПВРУ 1353-VIII
village	Novopetrovske	Mezhova Raion	Myronove	ПВРУ 1377-VIII
village	Petrovske	Mezhova Raion	Zelene	ПВРУ 1377-VIII
village	Kirove	Nikopol Raion	Chystopil	ПВРУ 1353-VIII
village	Kolhospne	Nikopol Raion	Beketivka	ПВРУ 1353-VIII
village	Menzhyske	Nikopol Raion	Prymiske	ПВРУ 1353-VIII
village	Ordzhonikidze	Nikopol Raion	Stepove	ПВРУ 1353-VIII
village	Vydvyzhenets	Novomoskovsk Raion	Myroliubivka	ПВРУ 1037-VIII
village	Dniprelstan	Novomoskovsk Raion	Zatyshne	ПВРУ 1353-VIII
village	Komintern	Novomoskovsk Raion	Kozyrshchyna	ПВРУ 1037-VIII
village	Radselo	Novomoskovsk Raion	Vesele	ПВРУ 1037-VIII
selyshche	Frunze	Novomoskovsk Raion	Vyshneve	ПВРУ 1037-VIII
village	Kotovets	Pavlohrad Raion	Dachne	ПВРУ 1353-VIII
village	Telmana	Pavlohrad Raion	Shakhtarske	ПВРУ 1353-VIII
village	Zhovtneve	Petrykivka Raion	Kulisheve	ПВРУ 1037-VIII
village	Radselo	Petrykivka Raion	Radisne	ПВРУ 1374-VIII
village	Chervonopartyzanske	Petrykivka Raion	Mala Petrykivka	ПВРУ 1037-VIII
urban-type settlement	Brahynivka	Petropavlivka Raion	Zaliznychne	ПВРУ 1374-VIII
village	Brahynivka	Petropavlivka Raion	Bohynivka	ПВРУ 1353-VIII
village	Kirovka	Pokrovske Raion	Drozdy	ПВРУ 1353-VIII
village	Komunarivka	Pokrovske Raion	Khrystoforivka	ПВРУ 1377-VIII
village	Novopetrivske	Pokrovske Raion	Ternove	ПВРУ 1377-VIII
village	Tsykove	Pokrovske Raion	Levadne	ПВРУ 1037-VIII
village	Chervonyi Lyman	Pokrovske Raion	Dobropasove	ПВРУ 1377-VIII
selyshche	Zoria Komunizmu	Piatykhatky Raion	Zoria	ПВРУ 1037-VIII
village	Komsomolske	Piatykhatky Raion	Tsivky	ПВРУ 1353-VIII
village	Komunarivka	Piatykhatky Raion	Raiduzhne	ПВРУ 1353-VIII
selyshche	Radhospne	Piatykhatky Raion	Vershynne	ПВРУ 1377-VIII
village	Kholodiivka	Piatykhatky Raion	Baidakivka	ПВРУ 1377-VIII
village	Oktiabrske	Synelnykove Raion	Maksymivka	ПВРУ 1037-VIII
village	Petrivske	Synelnykove Raion	Verbky-Osokorivka	ПВРУ 1377-VIII
selyshche	Frunze	Synelnykove Raion	Vyshnevetske	ПВРУ 1037-VIII
village	Vilenka	Solone Raion	Vilne	ПВРУ 1353-VIII
village	Voikove	Solone Raion	Kvituche	ПВРУ 1353-VIII
village	Dzerzhynivka	Solone Raion	Iverske	ПВРУ 1353-VIII
village	Dniprelstan	Solone Raion	Pankove	ПВРУ 1377-VIII
selyshche	Yelizarove	Solone Raion	Sviatovasylivka	ПВРУ 1353-VIII
selyshche	Zhdanove	Solone Raion	Nadiivka	ПВРУ 1353-VIII
village	Leninske	Solone Raion	Bohdanivka	ПВРУ 1377-VIII
village	Liknep	Solone Raion	Soniachne	ПВРУ 1353-VIII
village	Moprivske	Solone Raion	Bahate	ПВРУ 1353-VIII
village	Radianske	Solone Raion	Vyshneve	ПВРУ 1353-VIII
village	Chervone	Solone Raion	Mezhove	ПВРУ 1353-VIII
village	Chervonyi Maiak	Solone Raion	Maiak	ПВРУ 1353-VIII
village	Chervonyi Yar	Solone Raion	Haidamatske	ПВРУ 1353-VIII
village	Chervonoarmiiske	Solone Raion	Hanno-Musiivka	ПВРУ 1377-VIII
village	Zhovtneve	Sofiivka Raion	Vakulove	ПВРУ 1377-VIII
village	Lenina	Sofiivka Raion	Dachne	ПВРУ 1353-VIII
village	Menzhynka	Sofiivka Raion	Shyroke	ПВРУ 1037-VIII
village	Volodymyrivka	Tomakivka Raion	Vysoke	ПВРУ 1377-VIII
village	Kirove	Tomakivka Raion	Krutenke	ПВРУ 1353-VIII
village	Chervonoukrainka	Tomakivka Raion	Veselyi Yar	ПВРУ 1353-VIII
village	Kotovske	Shyroke Raion	Myrne	ПВРУ 1037-VIII
village	Rozy Liuksemburh	Shyroke Raion	Hrechani Pody	ПВРУ 1377-VIII
village	Sverdlovkse	Shyroke Raion	Spaske	ПВРУ 1037-VIII
village	Chapaievka	Shyroke Raion	Blahodatne	ПВРУ 1037-VIII
village	Chervonyi Pluhatar	Shyroke Raion	Pluhatar	ПВРУ 1353-VIII
village	Komsomolske	Yurivka Raion	Solontsi	ПВРУ 1353-VIII
city	Dniprodzerzhynsk	Dniprodzerzhynsk city council	Kamianske	ПВРУ 1377-VIII
city	Dnipropetrovsk	Dnipropetrovsk city council	Dnipro	ПВРУ 1375-VIII
city	Ordzhonikidze	Ordzhonikidze city council	Pokrov	ПВРУ 1037-VIII

=== Donetsk Oblast ===
Type	Old name	Raion	New name	References
urban-type settlement	Voikovskyi	Amvrosiivka Raion	Kopani	ПВРУ 1351-VIII
selyshche	Volodarskoho	Amvrosiivka Raion	Verkhnioosykove	ПВРУ 1351-VIII
selyshche	Kotovskoho	Amvrosiivka Raion	Kalynove	ПВРУ 1351-VIII
village	Leninske	Amvrosiivka Raion	Verkhnioielanchyk	ПВРУ 1351-VIII
village	Novopetrivske	Amvrosiivka Raion, Blahodatne village council	Sadove	ПВРУ 1351-VIII
village	Novopetrivske	Amvrosiivka Raion, Oleksiivka village council	Vilkhivchyk	ПВРУ 1351-VIII
selyshche	Artemivske	Artemivsk Raion	Khromove	ПВРУ 1377-VIII
selyshche	Kalinina	Artemivsk Raion	Kalynivka	ПВРУ 984-VIII
village	Kirove	Artemivsk Raion	Sviato-Pokrovske	ПВРУ 984-VIII
village	Komuna	Artemivsk Raion	Debaltsivske	ПВРУ 1377-VIII
village	Krasne	Artemivsk Raion	Ivanivske	ПВРУ 1377-VIII
selyshche	Krasnyi Pakhar	Artemivsk Raion	Stupakove	ПВРУ 1466-VIII
village	Krasnyi Pakhar	Artemivsk Raion	Vozdvyzhenka	ПВРУ 984-VIII
village	Petrivske	Artemivsk Raion	Pazeno	ПВРУ 1037-VIII
village	Karla Marksa	Velyka Novosilka Raion	Myrne	ПВРУ 984-VIII
selyshche	Oktiabr	Velyka Novosilka Raion	Blahodatne	ПВРУ 984-VIII
selyshche	Oktiabrske	Velyka Novosilka Raion	Kermenchyk	ПВРУ 984-VIII
village	Chervona Zirka	Velyka Novosilka Raion	Zirka	ПВРУ 984-VIII
village	Kalinine	Volnovakha Raion	Kalynove	ПВРУ 1037-VIII
village	Kirovske	Volnovakha Raion	Dianivka	ПВРУ 984-VIII
village	Kominternove	Volnovakha Raion	Pikuzy	ПВРУ 1466-VIII
urban-type settlement	Komsomolskyi	Volnovakha Raion	Hrafske	ПВРУ 1377-VIII
village	Krasnivka	Volnovakha Raion	Soniachne	ПВРУ 1353-VIII
village	Oktiabrske	Volnovakha Raion	Stritenka	ПВРУ 984-VIII
village	Petrivske	Volnovakha Raion, Oktiabrske village council	Petrivka	ПВРУ 984-VIII
selyshche	Petrivske	Volnovakha Raion	Nova Olenivka	ПВРУ 1377-VIII
village	Chycherine	Volnovakha Raion	Novoapostolivka	ПВРУ 1377-VIII
urban-type settlement	Volodarske	Volodarske Raion	Nikolske	ПВРУ 984-VIII
village	Kirove	Volodarske Raion	Kelerivka	ПВРУ 984-VIII
village	Oktiabrske	Volodarske Raion	Krynychne	ПВРУ 984-VIII
village	Starchenkove	Volodarske Raion	Temriuk	ПВРУ 1377-VIII
village	Artema	Dobropillia Raion	Nadiia	ПВРУ 984-VIII
village	Lenina	Dobropillia Raion	Myrne	ПВРУ 984-VIII
village	Oktiabrske	Dobropillia Raion	Shakhove	ПВРУ 1353-VIII
village	Petrivske	Dobropillia Raion, Zolotyi Kolodiaz village council	Petrivka	ПВРУ 984-VIII
village	Rozy Liuksemburh	Dobropillia Raion	Nove Shakhove	ПВРУ 1377-VIII
village	Urytske	Dobropillia Raion	Vesna	ПВРУ 984-VIII
selyshche	Artema	Kostiantynivka Raion	Dovha Balka	ПВРУ 1377-VIII
village	Artemivka	Kostiantynivka Raion	Sofiivka	ПВРУ 984-VIII
village	Illicha	Kostiantynivka Raion	Illinivka	ПВРУ 984-VIII
village	Pravdivka	Kostiantynivka Raion	Stara Mykolaivka	ПВРУ 1377-VIII
village	Vorovske	Krasnoarmiisk Raion	Yurivka	ПВРУ 1353-VIII
selyshche	Dymytrove	Krasnoarmiisk Raion	Kotlyne	ПВРУ 1377-VIII
village	Kalinine	Krasnoarmiisk Raion	Kalynivka	ПВРУ 984-VIII
village	Krasne	Krasnoarmiisk Raion	Sontsivka	ПВРУ 1377-VIII
village	Lenine	Krasnoarmiisk Raion	Molodetske	ПВРУ 984-VIII
village	Leninske	Krasnoarmiisk Raion	Hryhorivka	ПВРУ 984-VIII
village	Lunacharske	Krasnoarmiisk Raion	Fedorivka	ПВРУ 984-VIII
village	Petrovskoho	Krasnoarmiisk Raion	Horikhove	ПВРУ 1377-VIII
village	Ulianivka	Krasnoarmiisk Raion	Malynivka	ПВРУ 1353-VIII
selyshche	Dzerzhynske	Krasnyi Lyman Raion	Myrne	ПВРУ 984-VIII
village	Illichivka	Krasnyi Lyman Raion	Ozerne	ПВРУ 984-VIII
urban-type settlement	Kirovsk	Krasnyi Lyman Raion	Zarichne	ПВРУ 984-VIII
village	Ostrovskoho	Marinka Raion	Kostiantynopolske	ПВРУ 1377-VIII
village	Dzerzhynske	Novoazovsk Raion	Azov	ПВРУ 1351-VIII
village	Krasnoarmiiske	Novoazovsk Raion	Khreshchatytske	ПВРУ 1351-VIII
village	Leninske	Novoazovsk Raion	Uzhivka	ПВРУ 1351-VIII
village	Oktiabr	Novoazovsk Raion	Verkhnioshyrokivske	ПВРУ 1351-VIII
village	Rozy Liuksemburh	Novoazovsk Raion	Oleksandrivske	ПВРУ 1351-VIII
village	Illichivske	Pershotravneve Raion	Pokrovske	ПВРУ 1037-VIII
village	Radianska Ukraina	Pershotravneve Raion	Prymiske	ПВРУ 1377-VIII
village	Chervona Ukraina	Pershotravneve Raion	Ukrainka	ПВРУ 984-VIII
village	Krasnoarmiiske	Sloviansk Raion	Novoselivka	ПВРУ 1037-VIII
village	Oktiabrske	Sloviansk Raion	Maiachka	ПВРУ 1037-VIII
village	Voikove	Starobesheve Raion	Kamiane	ПВРУ 1351-VIII
village	Vorovske	Starobesheve Raion	Verkhokamianka	ПВРУ 1351-VIII
selyshche	Kalinina	Starobesheve Raion	Manzhykiv Kut	ПВРУ 1351-VIII
selyshche	Kirove	Starobesheve Raion	Verezamske	ПВРУ 1351-VIII
city	Komsomolske	Starobesheve Raion	Kalmiuske	ПВРУ 1351-VIII
village	Komunarivka	Starobesheve Raion	Sarabash	ПВРУ 1351-VIII
village	Leninske	Starobesheve Raion	Liubivka	ПВРУ 1351-VIII
village	Kalinine	Telmanove Raion	Bilokrynychne	ПВРУ 1351-VIII
village	Krasnyi Oktiabr	Telmanove Raion	Maiorove	ПВРУ 1351-VIII
village	Oktiabrske	Telmanove Raion, Konkove village council	Oleksandrivske	ПВРУ 1351-VIII
village	Oktiabrske	Telmanove Raion, Michurine village council	Chyrylianske	ПВРУ 1351-VIII
village	Radianske	Telmanove Raion	Lavrynove	ПВРУ 1351-VIII
urban-type settlement	Telmanove	Telmanove Raion	Boikivske	ПВРУ 1351-VIII
village	Dymytrova	Shakhtarsk Raion	Vidrodzhennia	ПВРУ 1351-VIII
selyshche	Krasnyi Partyzan	Yasynuvata Raion	Betmanove	ПВРУ 1351-VIII
selyshche	Petrivske	Yasynuvata Raion	Stepove	ПВРУ 1377-VIII
village	Rozivka	Yasynuvata Raion	Oleksandropil	ПВРУ 1377-VIII
city	Artemivsk	Artemivsk city council	Bakhmut	ПВРУ 984-VIII
city	Artemove	Dzerzhynsk city council	Zalizne	ПВРУ 1377-VIII
selyshche	Horkoho	Dzerzhynsk city council	Dachne	ПВРУ 984-VIII
city	Dzerzhynsk	Dzerzhynsk city council	Toretsk	ПВРУ 984-VIII
urban-type settlement	Kirove	Dzerzhynsk city council	Pivnichne	ПВРУ 1377-VIII
urban-type settlement	Leninske	Dzerzhynsk city council	Pivdenne	ПВРУ 1377-VIII
selyshche	Pershe Travnia	Dzerzhynsk city council	Ozarianivka	ПВРУ 984-VIII
city	Dymytrov	Dymytrov city council	Myrnohrad	ПВРУ 1353-VIII
village	Oktiabrske	Donetsk city council	Kyslyche	ПВРУ 1351-VIII
village	Chervonozoriane	Druzhkivka city council	Druzhkivske	ПВРУ 1377-VIII
urban-type settlement	Karlo-Marksove	Yenakiieve city council	Sofiivka	ПВРУ 1351-VIII
village	Petrivske	Yenakiieve city council	Krynychky	ПВРУ 1351-VIII
city	Yunokomunarivsk	Yenakiieve city council	Bunhe	ПВРУ 1351-VIII
city	Kirovske	Kirovsk city council	Khrestivka	ПВРУ 1351-VIII
city	Krasnoarmiisk	Krasnoarmiisk city council	Pokrovsk	ПВРУ 1353-VIII
city	Krasnyi Lyman	Krasnyi Lyman city council	Lyman	ПВРУ 984-VIII
urban-type settlement	Krasnyi Oktiabr	Makiivka city council	Lypske	ПВРУ 1351-VIII
urban-type settlement	Proletarske	Makiivka city council	Piatypillia	ПВРУ 1351-VIII
urban-type settlement	Sverdlove	Makiivka city council	Kholodne	ПВРУ 1351-VIII
selyshche	Chervonyi Zhovten	Snizhne city council	Balka	ПВРУ 1351-VIII
city	Torez	Torez city council	Chystiakove	ПВРУ 1351-VIII
urban-type settlement	Voikove	Khartsyzk city council	Blahodatne	ПВРУ 1351-VIII

=== Ivano-Frankivsk Oblast ===
- no places to rename

=== Kharkiv Oblast ===
Type	Old name	Raion	New name	References
selyshche	Zhovtneve	Balakliia Raion, Asiivka village council	Slobozhanske	ПВРУ 984-VIII
selyshche	Zhovtneve	Balakliia Raion, Pryshyb village council	Pokrovske	ПВРУ 1037-VIII
village	Chervona Husarivka	Balakliia Raion	Nova Husarivka	ПВРУ 1037-VIII
urban-type settlement	Chervonyi Donets	Balakliia Raion	Donets	ПВРУ 1353-VIII
village	Chervonyi Step	Balakliia Raion	Stepok	ПВРУ 1037-VIII
village	Chervonyi Yar	Balakliia Raion	Kalynivka	ПВРУ 1037-VIII
village	Zhovtneve	Barvinkove Raion	Vysoke	ПВРУ 984-VIII
village	Illichivka	Barvinkove Raion	Ridne	ПВРУ 1353-VIII
village	Vorovskoho	Blyzniuky Raion	Slobozhanske	ПВРУ 1353-VIII
village	Zhovtneve	Blyzniuky Raion	Verkhove	ПВРУ 1465-VIII
village	Internatsionalne	Blyzniuky Raion	Batiushky	ПВРУ 984-VIII
village	Kirove	Blyzniuky Raion	Kvitneve	ПВРУ 1353-VIII
village	Petrivske	Blyzniuky Raion	Myrne	ПВРУ 1353-VIII
village	Proletarske	Blyzniuky Raion	Klenove	ПВРУ 984-VIII
village	Radhospne	Blyzniuky Raion	Vyshneve	ПВРУ 1353-VIII
selyshche	Volodarivka	Bohodukhiv Raion	Mala Ivanivka	ПВРУ 1377-VIII
selyshche	Krupskoi	Bohodukhiv Raion	Zarichne	ПВРУ 984-VIII
selyshche	Chervona Nyva	Bohodukhiv Raion	Viktorivka	ПВРУ 1353-VIII
village	Proletarske	Borova Raion	Stepove	ПВРУ 1037-VIII
selyshche	Komsomolske	Velykyi Burluk Raion	Sonino	ПВРУ 1353-VIII
selyshche	Pioner	Velykyi Burluk Raion	Kurhanne	ПВРУ 1037-VIII
village	Proletarka	Velykyi Burluk Raion	Yurivka	ПВРУ 1353-VIII
village	Chervonoarmiiske	Velykyi Burluk Raion	Polkovnyche	ПВРУ 1377-VIII
village	Zhovtneve	Vovchansk Raion, Rubizhne village council	Zamulivka	ПВРУ 984-VIII
village	Zhovtneve	Vovchansk Raion, Chervonoarmiiska Persha village council	Lyman	ПВРУ 984-VIII
village	Zhovtneve Druhe	Vovchansk Raion	Mykolaivka	ПВРУ 984-VIII
village	Petrivske	Vovchansk Raion	Zarichne	ПВРУ 1353-VIII
village	Proletarske	Vovchansk Raion	Losivka	ПВРУ 984-VIII
village	Profintern	Vovchansk Raion	Vyshneve	ПВРУ 984-VIII
village	Radianske	Vovchansk Raion	Hrafske	ПВРУ 984-VIII
village	Revoliutsiine	Vovchansk Raion	Buhaivka	ПВРУ 1377-VIII
village	Chervonoarmiiske Druhe	Vovchansk Raion	Kyrilivka	ПВРУ 984-VIII
village	Chervonoarmiiske Pershe	Vovchansk Raion	Symynivka	ПВРУ 1353-VIII
village	Zhovtneve	Dvorichna Raion	Bohdanivske	ПВРУ 1377-VIII
village	Illicha	Derhachi Raion	Nova Kozacha	ПВРУ 984-VIII
selyshche	Komunar	Derhachi Raion	Kurortne	ПВРУ 984-VIII
selyshche	Manuilivka	Derhachi Raion	Hryhorivka	ПВРУ 984-VIII
village	Kotovskoho	Zachepylivka Raion	Kotivka	ПВРУ 984-VIII
village	Petrivske	Zachepylivka Raion	Petrivka	ПВРУ 984-VIII
village	Ulianivka	Zachepylivka Raion	Olianivka	ПВРУ 1037-VIII
village	Chervona Peremoha	Zachepylivka Raion	Peremoha	ПВРУ 1037-VIII
village	Chervonyi Zhovten	Zachepylivka Raion	Travneve	ПВРУ 984-VIII
village	Chervonoarmiiske	Zachepylivka Raion	Vyshneve	ПВРУ 984-VIII
urban-type settlement	Komsomolske	Zmiiv Raion	Slobozhanske	ПВРУ 984-VIII
village	Proletarske	Zmiiv Raion	Vysochynivka	ПВРУ 1377-VIII
village	Radhospne	Zmiiv Raion	Vesele	ПВРУ 1377-VIII
village	Zhovtneve	Zolochiv Raion	Vysoke	ПВРУ 1037-VIII
selyshche	Zhovtneve	Zolochiv Raion	Kalynove	ПВРУ 1037-VIII
selyshche	Proletar	Zolochiv Raion	Mali Fesky	ПВРУ 1377-VIII
village	Zhovtneve	Izium Raion	Boholiubivka	ПВРУ 1353-VIII
village	Radianske	Izium Raion	Ridnyi Krai	ПВРУ 1353-VIII
village	Chervona Poliana	Izium Raion	Poliana	ПВРУ 984-VIII
village	Chervonyi Donets	Izium Raion	Shchaslyve	ПВРУ 1037-VIII
village	Chervonyi Oskil	Izium Raion	Oskil	ПВРУ 1353-VIII
village	Chervonyi Shakhtar	Izium Raion	Spivakivka	ПВРУ 1377-VIII
village	Artemivka	Kehychivka Raion	Vysoke	ПВРУ 1374-VIII
village	Komunarka	Kehychivka Raion	Novoivanivka	ПВРУ 984-VIII
village	Komunarske	Kehychivka Raion	Kozatske	ПВРУ 984-VIII
village	Ulianivka	Kehychivka Raion	Oleksandrivske	ПВРУ 984-VIII
urban-type settlement	Chapaieve	Kehychivka Raion	Slobozhanske	ПВРУ 984-VIII
village	Zhovtneve	Kolomak Raion	Novoivanivske	ПВРУ 1353-VIII
selyshche	Zhovtneve	Krasnohrad Raion	Pokrovske	ПВРУ 1353-VIII
village	Leninka	Krasnohrad Raion	Zoriane	ПВРУ 984-VIII
selyshche	Leninske	Krasnohrad Raion	Druzhba	ПВРУ 984-VIII
village	Oktiabrske	Krasnohrad Raion	Ivanivske	ПВРУ 1353-VIII
village	Chapaieve	Krasnohrad Raion	Vyshneve	ПВРУ 984-VIII
village	Komsomolets	Krasnokutsk Raion	Khutirske	ПВРУ 984-VIII
selyshche	Komsomolske	Krasnokutsk Raion	Buzova	ПВРУ 984-VIII
selyshche	Pionerske	Krasnokutsk Raion	Stepove	ПВРУ 1037-VIII
village	Chervonyi Prapor	Krasnokutsk Raion	Kniazha Dolyna	ПВРУ 1377-VIII
village	Petrivka	Kupiansk Raion	Osynovo	ПВРУ 1353-VIII
selyshche	Zhovtneve	Lozova Raion	Lahidne	ПВРУ 984-VIII
selyshche	Komsomolske	Lozova Raion	Myroliubivka	ПВРУ 984-VIII
village	Petrivske	Lozova Raion	Ukrainske	ПВРУ 984-VIII
village	Radianske	Lozova Raion	Stepove	ПВРУ 984-VIII
village	Revodarivka	Lozova Raion	Vodolaha	ПВРУ 984-VIII
village	Chervonyi Shakhtar	Lozova Raion	Rubizhne	ПВРУ 984-VIII
village	Komintern	Nova Vodolaha Raion	Slobozhanske	ПВРУ 984-VIII
village	Komsomolske	Nova Vodolaha Raion	Novoprosianske	ПВРУ 984-VIII
village	Melyhivka	Nova Vodolaha Raion	Mykolaivka	ПВРУ 69-IX
village	Riabukhyne	Nova Vodolaha Raion	Huliai Pole	ПВРУ 68-IX
selyshche	Bilshovyk	Pervomaisk Raion	Troitske	ПВРУ 1377-VIII
village	Zhovtneve	Pervomaisk Raion	Kalynivka	ПВРУ 1037-VIII
selyshche	Komsomolske	Pervomaisk Raion	Triichate	ПВРУ 1037-VIII
selyshche	Pravda	Pervomaisk Raion	Slobidske	ПВРУ 1377-VIII
village	Sovietske	Pervomaisk Raion	Stepove	ПВРУ 1037-VIII
village	Chervone Znameno	Pervomaisk Raion	Chervone	ПВРУ 1037-VIII
village	Novokomsomolske	Pechenihy Raion	Prymorske	ПВРУ 984-VIII
village	Zhovten	Sakhnovshchyna Raion	Suharivske	ПВРУ 1377-VIII
village	Leninske	Sakhnovshchyna Raion	Zelenyi Klyn	ПВРУ 1353-VIII
village	Chapaievka	Sakhnovshchyna Raion	Zelene	ПВРУ 1353-VIII
village	Artemivka	Kharkiv Raion	Blahodatne	ПВРУ 1037-VIII
village	Zhovtneve	Kharkiv Raion	Slobozhanske	ПВРУ 1353-VIII
village	Komunar	Kharkiv Raion	Kotliary	ПВРУ 984-VIII
selyshche	Komunar	Kharkiv Raion	Novyi Korotych	ПВРУ 1353-VIII
selyshche	Komunist	Kharkiv Raion	Dokuchaievske	ПВРУ 1353-VIII
selyshche	Radhospne	Kharkiv Raion, Babai village council	Zatyshne	ПВРУ 1037-VIII
selyshche	Radhospne	Kharkiv Raion, Vesele village council	Male Vesele	ПВРУ 1377-VIII
selyshche	Radhospne	Kharkiv Raion, Kulynychi village council	Elitne	ПВРУ 984-VIII
selyshche	Frunze	Kharkiv Raion	Slobidske	ПВРУ 1037-VIII
village	Petrivske	Chuhuiv Raion	Stepove	ПВРУ 984-VIII
selyshche	Chapaieva	Chuhuiv Raion	Rozdolne	ПВРУ 984-VIII
village	Leninka	Shevchenkove Raion	Rozdolne	ПВРУ 984-VIII
village	Dymytrova	Lozova city council	Ukrainske	ПВРУ 1037-VIII
village	Sotszmahannia	Chuhuiv city council	Vasyliv Khutir	ПВРУ 1353-VIII

=== Kherson Oblast ===
Type	Old name	Raion	New name	References
village	Kirove	Beryslav Raion	Lymanets	ПВРУ 1353-VIII
village	Kuibysheve	Beryslav Raion	Vitrove	ПВРУ 1353-VIII
selyshche	Udarnyk	Beryslav Raion	Monastyrske	ПВРУ 1377-VIII
village	Kirove	Bilozerka Raion	Tavriiske	ПВРУ 1037-VIII
village	Petrivske	Bilozerka Raion	Blahodatne	ПВРУ 1377-VIII
selyshche	Radianske	Bilozerka Raion	Myroliubivka	ПВРУ 1037-VIII
village	Telmana	Bilozerka Raion	Zarichne	ПВРУ 1037-VIII
selyshche	Chervonyi Podil	Bilozerka Raion	Myrne	ПВРУ 1037-VIII
urban-type settlement	Kalininske	Velyka Oleksandrivka Raion	Kalynivske	ПВРУ 1037-VIII
village	Karlo-Marksivske	Velyka Oleksandrivka Raion	Shchaslyve	ПВРУ 1037-VIII
village	Lenine	Verkhnii Rohachyk	Volodymyrivka	ПВРУ 1037-VIII
village	Proletarii	Verkhnii Rohachyk	Tavriiske	ПВРУ 1037-VIII
village	Petrivske	Vysokopillia Raion	Nova Shestirnia	ПВРУ 1377-VIII
village	Chervonoarmiiske	Vysokopillia Raion	Chereshneve	ПВРУ 1353-VIII
selyshche	Zhovtneve	Henichesk Raion	Nohaiske	ПВРУ 1377-VIII
village	Komisarivka	Henichesk Raion	Prymorske	ПВРУ 1374-VIII
urban-type settlement	Partyzany	Henichesk Raion	Rykove	ПВРУ 1353-VIII
selyshche	Radianske	Henichesk Raion	Tavriiske	ПВРУ 1377-VIII
village	Rozy Liuksemburh	Henichesk Raion	Khersonske	ПВРУ 1377-VIII
village	Frunze	Henichesk Raion	Azovske	ПВРУ 1353-VIII
village	Chervonopraporne	Henichesk Raion	Chervone	ПВРУ 1353-VIII
village	Shliakh Nezamozhnykа	Henichesk Raion	Hordiienkivtsi	ПВРУ 1377-VIII
village	Shchorsivka	Henichesk Raion	Oleksiivka	ПВРУ 1353-VIII
village	Bilshovyk	Hola Prystan Raion	Prymorske	ПВРУ 1353-VIII
selyshche	Zhovtneve	Hola Prystan Raion	Svitanok	ПВРУ 1037-VIII
village	Industrialne	Hola Prystan Raion	Bratske	ПВРУ 1353-VIII
village	Komuna	Hola Prystan Raion	Tendrivske	ПВРУ 1353-VIII
village	Krasnoznamianka	Hola Prystan Raion	Oleksandrivka	ПВРУ 1353-VIII
village	Chervonopraporne	Hornostaivka Raion	Vilne	ПВРУ 1037-VIII
village	Kirove	Ivanivka Raion	Shchaslyve	ПВРУ 1037-VIII
village	Frunze	Ivanivka Raion	Ahaimany	ПВРУ 1037-VIII
village	Chervonyi Prapor	Ivanivka Raion	Zelenyi Hai	ПВРУ 1037-VIII
village	Chervonyi Чабан	Kalanchak Raion	Preobrazhenka	ПВРУ 1037-VIII
selyshche	Chervonyi Perekop	Kakhovka Raion	Zelenyi Pid	ПВРУ 1377-VIII
village	Komsomolske	Nyzhni Sirohozy	Dontsove	ПВРУ 1037-VIII
village	Volodymyro-Illinka	Novotroitske Raion	Chumatskyi Shliakh	ПВРУ 1377-VIII
selyshche	Komsomolske	Skadovsk Raion	Petropavlivka	ПВРУ 1037-VIII
village	Komunarivka	Skadovsk Raion	Radisne	ПВРУ 1037-VIII
village	Leninske	Skadovsk Raion	Karabulat	ПВРУ 1037-VIII
village	Ptakhivka	Skadovsk Raion	Oleksandrivka	ПВРУ 1377-VIII
selyshche	Radhospne	Skadovsk Raion	Blahodatne	ПВРУ 984-VIII
village	Leninka	Tsiurupynsk Raion	Ridne	ПВРУ 1353-VIII
village	Proletarka	Tsiurupynsk Raion	Chelburda	ПВРУ 1377-VIII
city	Tsiurupynsk	Tsiurupynsk Raion	Oleshky	ПВРУ 1377-VIII
selyshche	Tsiurupynsk	Tsiurupynsk Raion	Poima	ПВРУ 1377-VIII
village	Zhovtneve	Chaplynka Raion	Blahodatne	ПВРУ 1037-VIII
selyshche	Zhovtneve	Kherson city council	Inzhenerne	ПВРУ 1377-VIII
selyshche	Kuibysheve	Kherson city council	Zymivnyk	ПВРУ 1377-VIII
selyshche	Petrovskoho	Kherson city council	Blahovishchenske	ПВРУ 1377-VIII

=== Khmelnytskyi Oblast ===
Type	Old name	Raion	New name	References
village	Zhovtneve	Volochysk Raion	Lisove	ПВРУ 1037-VIII
village	Petrivske	Volochysk Raion	Butivtsi	ПВРУ 1377-VIII
village	Radianske	Derazhnia Raion	Ivankivtsi	ПВРУ 1377-VIII
village	Petrivske	Dunaivtsi Raion	Balynivka	ПВРУ 1377-VIII
village	Ulianivka	Iziaslav Raion	Havrylivka	ПВРУ 1377-VIII
village	Zhovtneve	Kamianets-Podilskyi Raion	Muksha Kytaihorodska	ПВРУ 1377-VIII
village	Zhovtneve	Krasyliv Raion	Novi Tereshky	ПВРУ 1377-VIII
village	Ulianivka	Krasyliv Raion	Yukht	ПВРУ 1037-VIII
village	Ulianivka Друга	Krasyliv Raion	Svitle	ПВРУ 1037-VIII
village	Chapaievka	Krasyliv Raion	Kalynivka	ПВРУ 1037-VIII
selyshche	Komunar	Nova Ushytsia	Zahrodske	ПВРУ 1377-VIII
village	Radhospne	Polonne Raion	Radisne	ПВРУ 1037-VIII
village	Leninske	Starokostiantynivka Raion	Lisove	ПВРУ 1037-VIII
village	Petrivske	Stara Syniava	Khutir Dashkivskyi	ПВРУ 1377-VIII
village	Leninske	Teofipol Raion	Pidlisky	ПВРУ 1037-VIII
village	Ulianove	Teofipol Raion	Haivka	ПВРУ 1377-VIII
village	Chervona Zirka	Khmelnytskyi Raion	Prybuzke	ПВРУ 1377-VIII
village	Leninske	Chemerivtsi Raion	Vyshneve	ПВРУ 1037-VIII

=== Kyiv ===
- no places to rename (there are no other settlements subordinated to Kyiv City Council except for the City of Kyiv)

=== Kyiv Oblast ===
Type	Old name	Raion	New name	References
village	Bilshovyk	Baryshivka Raion	Dubove	ПВРУ 1037-VIII
village	Chervonoarmiiske	Baryshivka Raion	Bakumivka	ПВРУ 984-VIII
village	Zhovtneve	Boryspil Raion	Zherebiatyn	ПВРУ 984-VIII
village	Kirove	Boryspil Raion	Kuchakiv	ПВРУ 984-VIII
village	Leninivka	Boryspil Raion	Zatyshne	ПВРУ 984-VIII
village	Petrovske	Boryspil Raion	Petropavlivske	ПВРУ 1037-VIII
village	Dibrovo-Leninske	Borodianka Raion	Dibrova	ПВРУ 984-VIII
village	Zhovtneve	Borodianka Raion	Dmytrivka	ПВРУ 1037-VIII
village	Dymytrove	Brovary Raion	Kvitneve	ПВРУ 1377-VIII
village	Kuibysheve	Brovary Raion	Pokrovske	ПВРУ 984-VIII
village	Frunzivka	Brovary Raion	Haiove	ПВРУ 984-VIII
village	Petrivske	Vyshhorod Raion	Dmytrivka	ПВРУ 1377-VIII
village	Voikove	Zghurivka Raion	Voitove	ПВРУ 1353-VIII
village	Zhovtneve	Zghurivka Raion	Voznesenske	ПВРУ 1037-VIII
village	Lenine	Zghurivka Raion	Shchaslyve	ПВРУ 984-VIII
village	Petrivske	Zghurivka Raion	Polkovnyche	ПВРУ 1377-VIII
village	Pravo Zhovtnia	Zghurivka Raion	Liubomyrivka	ПВРУ 984-VIII
village	Kirove	Ivankiv Raion	Kalynove	ПВРУ 984-VIII
village	Petrivske	Ivankiv Raion	Staryi Mist	ПВРУ 984-VIII
village	Zhovtneve	Kaharlyk Raion	Zelenyi Yar	ПВРУ 984-VIII
village	Petrivske	Kaharlyk Raion, Velyki Prytski village council	Vyselka	ПВРУ 984-VIII
village	Petrivske	Kaharlyk Raion, Horokhove village council	Horokhivske	ПВРУ 984-VIII
village	Petrivske	Kaharlyk Raion, Khalcha village council	Vyselkove	ПВРУ 984-VIII
village	Petrivske	Kyiv-Sviatoshyn Raion	Sviatopetrivske	ПВРУ 984-VIII
village	Piatyrichka	Myronivka Raion	Nova Myronivka	ПВРУ 1377-VIII
village	Zhovtneve	Pereiaslav-Khmelnytskyi Raion	Studenyky	ПВРУ 1353-VIII
village	Lenine	Pereiaslav-Khmelnytskyi Raion	Dovha Hreblia	ПВРУ 1377-VIII
village	Radianske	Pereiaslav-Khmelnytskyi Raion	Sosnivka	ПВРУ 1037-VIII
village	Volodarka	Poliske Raion	Levkovychi	ПВРУ 1377-VIII
village	Ordzhonikidze	Poliske Raion	Romanivka	ПВРУ 984-VIII
village	Chapaieve	Poliske Raion	Lisove	ПВРУ 984-VIII
village	Chervona Zirka	Poliske Raion	Zirka	ПВРУ 984-VIII
village	Dovhalivske	Rokytne Raion	Troitske	ПВРУ 1377-VIII
village	Petrivske	Rokytne Raion	Nova Makivka	ПВРУ 1377-VIII
village	Leninske	Skvyra Raion	Tarasivka	ПВРУ 984-VIII
village	Petrivske	Tarashcha Raion	Yushkiv Rih	ПВРУ 1377-VIII
village	Chapaievka	Tarashcha Raion	Kalynove	ПВРУ 984-VIII
village	Chervona Motovylivka	Fastiv Raion	Motovylivka	ПВРУ 1037-VIII

=== Kirovohrad Oblast ===
Type	Old name	Raion	New name	References
village	Volodymyro-Illinka	Bobrynets Raion	Aprelivske	ПВРУ 1377-VIII
village	Kirove	Bobrynets Raion	Hruzke	ПВРУ 984-VIII
village	Zhovtneve	Bobrynets Raion	Yabluchko	ПВРУ 1037-VIII
village	Kuibysheve	Bobrynets Raion	Blahodatne	ПВРУ 984-VIII
village	Sverdlove	Bobrynets Raion	Zlatopillia	ПВРУ 1377-VIII
village	Frunze	Bobrynets Raion	Bohdanivka	ПВРУ 1037-VIII
village	Chervonozorivka	Bobrynets Raion	Kryvonosove	ПВРУ 1037-VIII
village	Kotovske	Vilshanka Raion	Kutsa Balka	ПВРУ 1353-VIII
village	Zhovtneve	Haivoron Raion	Klenove	ПВРУ 984-VIII
village	Kotovka	Haivoron Raion	Pokrovske	ПВРУ 1037-VIII
village	Ordzhonikidze	Haivoron Raion	Sadove	ПВРУ 1037-VIII
selyshche	Illichivka	Holovanivsk Raion	Lisne	ПВРУ 984-VIII
village	Tsiurupy	Holovanivsk Raion	Ternove	ПВРУ 984-VIII
village	Bilshovyk	Dolynska Raion	Stepove	ПВРУ 984-VIII
village	Kirove	Dolynska Raion	Bokove	ПВРУ 984-VIII
village	Novomoskovske	Dolynska Raion	Sytaieve	ПВРУ 984-VIII
village	Krupske	Kirovohrad Raion	Karlivka	ПВРУ 984-VIII
village	Kirovka	Mala Vyska Raion	Myroliubivka	ПВРУ 1037-VIII
selyshche	Komsomolske	Mala Vyska Raion	Zapovidne	ПВРУ 984-VIII
village	Lenina	Mala Vyska Raion	Haivka	ПВРУ 1037-VIII
village	Lenino-Ulianovka	Mala Vyska Raion	Kalakolove	ПВРУ 1037-VIII
village	Leninske	Mala Vyska Raion	Pasichne	ПВРУ 1037-VIII
selyshche	Ulianivka	Mala Vyska Raion	Vyshneve	ПВРУ 1353-VIII
village	Zhovtneve	Novomyrhorod Raion	Myroliubivka	ПВРУ 1037-VIII
village	Krupske	Novomyrhorod Raion	Mykolaivka	ПВРУ 1037-VIII
village	Oktiabrske	Novoukrainka Raion	Vyshneve	ПВРУ 1037-VIII
village	Petrivske	Novoukrainka Raion	Pishchanske	ПВРУ 1037-VIII
village	Volodymyro-Ulianovka	Oleksandriia Raion	Novoulianivka	ПВРУ 1374-VIII
selyshche	Komintern	Oleksandriia Raion	Novoselivka	ПВРУ 984-VIII
village	Lenina Druhe	Oleksandriia Raion	Medove	ПВРУ 984-VIII
village	Lenina Pershe	Oleksandriia Raion	Zelene	ПВРУ 984-VIII
village	Proletarske	Oleksandriia Raion	Travneve	ПВРУ 984-VIII
village	Krasnofedorivka	Onufriivka Raion	Fedorivka	ПВРУ 1037-VIII
village	Petrivske	Petrove Raion	Kozatske	ПВРУ 1377-VIII
village	Illichivka	Svitlovodsk Raion	Vyshchepanivka	ПВРУ 984-VIII
village	Sverdlovka	Svitlovodsk Raion	Vilne	ПВРУ 1353-VIII
city	Ulianovka	Ulianovka Raion	Blahovishchenske	ПВРУ 1377-VIII
village	Dymytrove	Ustynivka Raion	Novoihorivka	ПВРУ 1377-VIII
village	Zhovtneve	Ustynivka Raion	Lebedyne	ПВРУ 1353-VIII
village	Leninka	Ustynivka Raion	Stepove	ПВРУ 984-VIII
village	Tretii Internatsional	Ustynivka Raion	Tretie	ПВРУ 1374-VIII
city	Kirovohrad	Kirovohrad city council	Kropyvnytskyi	ПВРУ 1468-VIII
urban-type settlement	Dymytrove	Oleksandriia city council	Oleksandriiske	ПВРУ 1353-VIII

=== Luhansk Oblast ===
Type	Old name	Raion	New name	References
village	Chervonyi Zhovten	Antratsyt Raion	Leonove	ПВРУ 1351-VIII
selyshche	Chervonoarmiiske	Bilokurakyne Raion	Myrne	ПВРУ 1353-VIII
selyshche	Ordzhonikidze	Krasnodon Raion	Nyzhnia Shevyrivka	ПВРУ 1351-VIII
village	Parkhomenko	Krasnodon Raion	Makariv Yar	ПВРУ 1351-VIII
selyshche	Radhospnyi	Krasnodon Raion	Malokalynove	ПВРУ 1351-VIII
village	Radianske	Krasnodon Raion	Horikhova Balka	ПВРУ 1351-VIII
village	Industrialne	Kreminna Raion	Pivneve	ПВРУ 1377-VIII
village	Petrivske	Kreminna Raion	Hrekivka	ПВРУ 1377-VIII
selyshche	Chervona Dibrova	Kreminna Raion	Dibrova	ПВРУ 1377-VIII
village	Karla Libknekhta	Lutuhyne Raion	Marivka	ПВРУ 1351-VIII
selyshche	Komsomolets	Lutuhyne Raion	Kamianyi Plast	ПВРУ 1351-VIII
urban-type settlement	Lenina	Lutuhyne Raion	Mariia	ПВРУ 1351-VIII
village	Komuna	Markivka Raion	Derkulove	ПВРУ 1377-VIII
village	Dzerzhynske	Milove Raion	Berezove	ПВРУ 984-VIII
village	Chervona Zirka	Milove Raion	Rannia Zoria	ПВРУ 1037-VIII
village	Chervona Zoria	Milove Raion	Shelestivka	ПВРУ 1377-VIII
selyshche	Radhospnyi	Novopskov Raion	Zelenyi Hai	ПВРУ 1377-VIII
city	Artemivsk	Perevalsk Raion	Kypuche	ПВРУ 1351-VIII
village	Красна Zoria	Perevalsk Raion	Chornohorivka	ПВРУ 1466-VIII
selyshche	Radhospnyi	Perevalsk Raion	Seleznivske	ПВРУ 1351-VIII
selyshche	Chervonyi Prapor	Perevalsk Raion	Stare	ПВРУ 1351-VIII
village	Artemivka	Svatove Raion	Miasozharivka	ПВРУ 1377-VIII
village	Zhovtneve	Svatove Raion	Dzherelne	ПВРУ 984-VIII
village	Kalynivka	Svatove Raion	Storozhivka	ПВРУ 1377-VIII
selyshche	Komsomolskyi	Svatove Raion	Lahidne	ПВРУ 984-VIII
village	Pervomaisk	Svatove Raion	Travneve	ПВРУ 984-VIII
village	Petrivka	Svatove Raion	Korzhove	ПВРУ 1377-VIII
village	Petrivske	Svatove Raion	Vestativka	ПВРУ 1377-VIII
village	Rozivka	Svatove Raion	Anriivka	ПВРУ 1377-VIII
village	Sverdlovka	Svatove Raion, Nyzhnia Duvanka village council	Tverdokhlibove	ПВРУ 1377-VIII
village	Sverdlovka	Svatove Raion, Raihorodka village council	Novoiehorivka	ПВРУ 1374-VIII
urban-type settlement	Biriukove	Svatove Raion	Krynychne	ПВРУ 1351-VIII
village	Krasnyi Luch	Slovianoserbsk Raion	Mamusheve	ПВРУ 1351-VIII
urban-type settlement	Lotykove	Slovianoserbsk Raion	Ivanivske	ПВРУ 1351-VIII
urban-type settlement	Frunze	Slovianoserbsk Raion	Sentianivka	ПВРУ 1466-VIII
urban-type settlement	Petrivka	Stanytsia Luhanska Raion	Petropavlivka	ПВРУ 1377-VIII
village	Pionerske	Stanytsia Luhanska Raion	Sukhodil	ПВРУ 1377-VIII
village	Chervonyi Zhovten	Stanytsia Luhanska Raion	Sotenne	ПВРУ 1377-VIII
village	Illichivka	Troitske Raion	Zaitseve	ПВРУ 1377-VIII
village	Kalinine	Troitske Raion	Dzherelne	ПВРУ 1377-VIII
village	Krasna Chapliivka	Troitske Raion	Chapliivka	ПВРУ 1377-VIII
city	Kirovsk	Kirovsk city council	Holubivka	ПВРУ 1351-VIII
urban-type settlement	Chervonohvardiiske	Kirovsk city council	Krynychanske	ПВРУ 1351-VIII
urban-type settlement	Enhelsove	Krasnodon city council	Buran	ПВРУ 1351-VIII
city	Krasnodon	Krasnodon city council	Sorokyne	ПВРУ 1351-VIII
urban-type settlement	Krasnodon	Krasnodon city council	Teple	ПВРУ 1351-VIII
village	Artema	Krasnyi Luch city council	Zherebiache	ПВРУ 1351-VIII
city	Vakhrusheve	Krasnyi Luch city council	Bokovo-Khrustalne	ПВРУ 1351-VIII
city	Krasnyi Luch	Krasnyi Luch city council	Khrustalnyi	ПВРУ 1351-VIII
city	Petrovske	Krasnyi Luch city council	Petrovo-Krasnosillia	ПВРУ 1351-VIII
selyshche	Dzerzhynske	Luhansk city council	Zrazkove	ПВРУ 1351-VIII
urban-type settlement	Yuvileine	Luhansk city council	Katerynivka	ПВРУ 1351-VIII
urban-type settlement	Dzerzhynskyi	Rovenky city council	Liubymivka	ПВРУ 1351-VIII
village	Krasnyi Kolos	Rovenky city council	Liubivski Kopalni	ПВРУ 1377-VIII
urban-type settlement	Proletarskyi	Rovenky city council	Kartushyne	ПВРУ 1351-VIII
village	Chapaievka	Rovenky city council	Zaliznychne	ПВРУ 1351-VIII
urban-type settlement	Volodarsk	Sverdlovsk city council	Vedmezhe	ПВРУ 1351-VIII
urban-type settlement	Kalininskyi	Sverdlovsk city council	Kundriuche	ПВРУ 1351-VIII
urban-type settlement	Komsomolskyi	Sverdlovsk city council	Dubove	ПВРУ 1351-VIII
urban-type settlement	Leninske	Sverdlovsk city council	Valianivske	ПВРУ 1351-VIII
city	Sverdlovsk	Sverdlovsk city council	Dovzhansk	ПВРУ 1351-VIII
city	Chervonopartyzansk	Sverdlovsk city council	Voznesenivka	ПВРУ 1466-VIII
city	Stakhanov	Stakhanov city council	Kadiivka	ПВРУ 1351-VIII

=== Lviv Oblast ===
Type	Old name	Raion	New name	References
village	Andriivka	Busk Raion	Marmuzovychi	ПВРУ 1377-VIII
village	Maksymivka	Staryi Sambir Raion	Libukhova	ПВРУ 1377-VIII

=== Mykolaiv Oblast ===
Type	Old name	Raion	New name	References
village	Lenine	Bashtanka Raion	Lukianivka	ПВРУ 984-VIII
village	Chervona Zirka	Bashtanka Raion	Shliakhove	ПВРУ 984-VIII
village	Kimivka	Berezanka Raion	Kalynivka	ПВРУ 1377-VIII
village	Leninka	Berezanka Raion	Vynohradne	ПВРУ 1377-VIII
village	Chapaievka	Berezanka Raion	Shchaslyve	ПВРУ 1377-VIII
village	Chervona Ukrainka	Berezanka Raion	Ukrainka	ПВРУ 1377-VIII
village	Illichivka	Bratske Raion	Ivanivka	ПВРУ 1377-VIII
village	Shcorsa	Bratske Raion	Stepove	ПВРУ 984-VIII
urban-type settlement	Kudriavtsivka	Veselynove Raion	Tokarivka	ПВРУ 1377-VIII
village	Chervoni Koshary	Voznesensk Raion	Vilne	ПВРУ 1377-VIII
village	Hulianytske	Vradiivka Raion	Pokrovske	ПВРУ 1377-VIII
village	Zhovtneve	Vradiivka Raion	Novomykhailivske	ПВРУ 1377-VIII
village	Zhovtneve	Domanivka Raion	Tsvitkove	ПВРУ 1377-VIII
village	Kuibyshevka	Domanivka Raion	Buzki Porohy	ПВРУ 1377-VIII
village	Frunze	Domanivka Raion	Petropavlivka	ПВРУ 1377-VIII
village	Chervonyi Kyiv	Domanivka Raion	Kyiv	ПВРУ 1377-VIII
village	Kuibyshevka	Yelanets Raion	Velyka Solona	ПВРУ 1377-VIII
village	Barmashove	Zhovtnevyi Raion	Bilozirka	ПВРУ 1353-VIII
village	Vorovske	Zhovtnevyi Raion	Stepove	ПВРУ 1377-VIII
selyshche	Kolarivka	Zhovtnevyi Raion	Karavelove	ПВРУ 1377-VIII
village	Komsomolske	Zhovtnevyi Raion	Blahodatne	ПВРУ 1353-VIII
selyshche	Pamiat Komunariv	Zhovtnevyi Raion	Sviatomykolaivka	ПВРУ 1377-VIII
village	Petrivske	Zhovtnevyi Raion	Водокачка	ПВРУ 1377-VIII
village	Zhovten	Kazanka Raion	Nove	ПВРУ 1377-VIII
selyshche	Nezamozhnyk	Kazanka Raion	Hranitne	ПВРУ 1377-VIII
village	Chervona Znamianka	Kazanka Raion	Shevchenkove	ПВРУ 1377-VIII
village	Lenine	Kryve Ozero Raion	Hoidai	ПВРУ 1377-VIII
selyshche	Chervonyi Orach	Kryve Ozero Raion	Semenivka	ПВРУ 1377-VIII
selyshche	Zhovtneve	Mykolaiv Raion	Chumaky	ПВРУ 1377-VIII
village	Kirove	Mykolaiv Raion	Zarichne	ПВРУ 1353-VIII
selyshche	Komsomolske	Mykolaiv Raion	Blahodarivka	ПВРУ 1465-VIII
selyshche	Radhospne	Mykolaiv Raion	Chemerliieve	ПВРУ 1377-VIII
selyshche	Radsad	Mykolaiv Raion	Radisnyi Sad	ПВРУ 1353-VIII
village	Ulianivka	Mykolaiv Raion	Mykhailivka	ПВРУ 1353-VIII
selyshche	Chervonoarmiiske	Mykolaiv Raion	Myrne	ПВРУ 1377-VIII
village	Zhovtneve	Novyi Buh Raion, Vilne Zaporizhzhia village council	Stepove	ПВРУ 1377-VIII
village	Zhovtneve	Novyi Buh Raion, Novyi Buh city council	Stantsiine	ПВРУ 1377-VIII
selyshche	Shchorsove	Novyi Buh Raion	Shchaslyve	ПВРУ 1377-VIII
village	Artemivka	Nova Odesa Raion	Ozerne	ПВРУ 1377-VIII
village	Kirovka	Nova Odesa Raion	Stepove	ПВРУ 1037-VIII
village	Zhovten	Ochakiv Raion	Soniachne	ПВРУ 1377-VIII
village	Zhovtneve	Pervomaisk Raion	Zoriane	ПВРУ 1377-VIII
village	Kuibysheve	Snihuriv Raion	Kalynivka	ПВРУ 1037-VIII
selyshche	Krasne Znamia	Snihuriv Raion	Liubomyrivka	ПВРУ 1465-VIII
selyshche	Radhospne	Snihuriv Raion	Stepove	ПВРУ 1377-VIII
village	Chervona Zirka	Snihuriv Raion	Suvore	ПВРУ 1377-VIII
village	Chervonyi Promin	Snihuriv Raion	Promin	ПВРУ 1037-VIII

=== Odesa Oblast ===
Type	Old name	Raion	New name	References
village	Ukhozhany	Balta Raion	Novopol	ПВРУ 1353-VIII
village	Chervona Zirka	Balta Raion	Shumylove	ПВРУ 1377-VIII
village	Vovkove	Berezivka Raion	Танівка	ПВРУ 1377-VIII
village	Жовтнівка	Berezivka Raion	Виноград	ПВРУ 1377-VIII
village	Kotovske	Berezivka Raion, Rozkvit community	Chudske	ПВРУ 1377-VIII
village	Kotovske	Berezivka Raion, Chervonovolodymyrivka village council	Kotovka	ПВРУ 1353-VIII
village	Chervonyi Ahronom	Berezivka Raion	Vyshneve	ПВРУ 1353-VIII
village	Chervonoarmiiske	Berezivka Raion	Novokalcheve	ПВРУ 1377-VIII
village	Chervonovolodymyrivka	Berezivka Raion	Mykhailivka	ПВРУ 1377-VIII
selyshche	Zhovtneva Revoliutsiia	Biliaivka Raion	Radisne	ПВРУ 1037-VIII
village	Kotovka	Biliaivka Raion	Lativka	ПВРУ 1377-VIII
village	Leninske Pershe	Biliaivka Raion	Soniachne	ПВРУ 1353-VIII
village	Petrivske	Biliaivka Raion	Petrove	ПВРУ 1353-VIII
village	Chapaieve	Biliaivka Raion	Tykhe	ПВРУ 1353-VIII
village	Chervona Zirka	Biliaivka Raion	Zoriane	ПВРУ 1353-VIII
selyshche	Chervonyi Rozselenets	Biliaivka Raion	Rozselenets	ПВРУ 1353-VIII
village	Zhovtneve	Bolhrad Raion	Karakurt	ПВРУ 1353-VIII
village	Nove Zhovtneve	Bolhrad Raion	Novyi Karakurt	ПВРУ 1353-VIII
village	Chervonoarmiiske	Bolhrad Raion	Kubei	ПВРУ 1353-VIII
village	Artema	Velyka Mykhailivka Raion	Trudomyrivka	ПВРУ 1353-VIII
village	Blahoieve	Velyka Mykhailivka Raion	Martove	ПВРУ 1353-VIII
village	Dzerzhynske	Velyka Mykhailivka Raion	Yermishkove	ПВРУ 1353-VIII
village	Kirove	Velyka Mykhailivka Raion	Vyshneve	ПВРУ 1353-VIII
village	Nezamozhnyk	Velyka Mykhailivka Raion	Zamozhne	ПВРУ 1353-VIII
village	Petrivske	Velyka Mykhailivka Raion	Polishpakove	ПВРУ 1377-VIII
village	Chapaieve	Velyka Mykhailivka Raion	Vorobiivka	ПВРУ 1377-VIII
village	Blahoieve	Ivanivka Raion	Velykyi Buialyk	ПВРУ 1377-VIII
village	Lenina	Ivanivka Raion	Bukachi	ПВРУ 1377-VIII
village	Chervonoznamianka	Ivanivka Raion	Znamianka	ПВРУ 1467-VIII
village	Shchorsove	Ivanivka Raion	Shemetove	ПВРУ 1353-VIII
village	Kotovtsi	Kodyma Raion	Serhiivka	ПВРУ 1377-VIII
village	Blahoieve	Lymanskyi Raion	Khrysto-Boteve	ПВРУ 1377-VIII
village	Illichivka	Lymanskyi Raion	Ilichanka	ПВРУ 1353-VIII
village	Kirove	Lymanskyi Raion	Troiandove	ПВРУ 1374-VIII
urban-type settlement	Kominternivske	Lymanskyi Raion	Dobroslav	ПВРУ 1465-VIII
village	Petrivka	Lymanskyi Raion	Kurisove	ПВРУ 1377-VIII
village	Petrovskoho	Lymanskyi Raion	Vyshneve	ПВРУ 1037-VIII
village	Sverdlove	Lymanskyi Raion	Ivanove	ПВРУ 1353-VIII
village	Chervona Nyva	Lymanskyi Raion	Tylihulske	ПВРУ 1377-VIII
selyshche	Kuibyshevske	Kotovsk Raion	Kazbeky	ПВРУ 1377-VIII
village	Chapaievka	Kotovsk Raion, Kuialnyk village council	Malyi Kuialnyk	ПВРУ 1377-VIII
village	Chapaievka	Kotovsk Raion, Chapaievka village council	Stavky	ПВРУ 1377-VIII
urban-type settlement	Krasni Okny	Krasni Okny Raion	Okny	ПВРУ 1377-VIII
village	Chervonyi Orach	Krasni Okny Raion	Novyi Orach	ПВРУ 1353-VIII
village	Zhovtneve	Liubashiv Raion	Vyshneve	ПВРУ 1037-VIII
village	Vorovskoho	Mykolaivka Raion	Stavkove	ПВРУ 984-VIII
village	Lenintal	Ovidiopol Raion	Libental	ПВРУ 1353-VIII
village	Mizikevycha	Ovidiopol Raion	Lymanka	ПВРУ 1377-VIII
village	Kirove	Rozdilna Raion	Blahodatne	ПВРУ 1353-VIII
village	Leninske Druhe	Rozdilna Raion	Novodmytrivka Druha	ПВРУ 1353-VIII
village	Pionerske	Rozdilna Raion	Vynohradivka	ПВРУ 1353-VIII
village	Zhovtneve	Tarutyne Raion	Matyldivka	ПВРУ 1377-VIII
village	Dmytrivka	Tatarbunary Raion	Delzhyler	ПВРУ 1353-VIII
village	Lenine	Frunzivka Raion	Torosove	ПВРУ 1037-VIII
urban-type settlement	Frunzivka	Frunzivka Raion	Zakharivka	ПВРУ 1377-VIII
village	Zhovten	Shyriaieve Raion	Petrovirivka	ПВРУ 1353-VIII
village	Zhovtneve	Shyriaieve Raion, Novoandriivka village council	Doktorove	ПВРУ 1353-VIII
village	Zhovtneve	Shyriaieve Raion, Ordzhonikidze village council	Kryzhanivka	ПВРУ 1353-VIII
village	Zhovtneve	Shyriaieve Raion, Stari Maiaky village council	Butsy	ПВРУ 1377-VIII
village	Ordzhonikidze	Shyriaieve Raion	Armashivka	ПВРУ 1353-VIII
village	Petrivske	Shyriaieve Raion	Zhukovske	ПВРУ 1377-VIII
village	Chervonyi Kut	Shyriaieve Raion	Chornyi Kut	ПВРУ 1377-VIII
city	Illichivsk	Illichivsk city council	Chornomorsk	ПВРУ 984-VIII
city	Kotovsk	Kotovsk city council	Podilsk	ПВРУ 1353-VIII

=== Poltava Oblast ===
Type	Old name	Raion	New name	References
village	Chapaievka	Belyka Bahachka Raion	Marianivka	ПВРУ 1377-VIII
village	Zhovtneve	Hadiach Raion	Stepove	ПВРУ 1037-VIII
village	Krasnoznamenka	Hadiach Raion	Serhiivka	ПВРУ 1037-VIII
village	Radianska Dacha	Hadiach Raion	Dachne	ПВРУ 984-VIII
village	Zhovtneve	Hlobyne Raion	Zarichne	ПВРУ 1353-VIII
village	Frunzivka	Hlobyne Raion	Troitske	ПВРУ 1037-VIII
village	Zhovtneve	Hrebinka Raion	Sotnytske	ПВРУ 1037-VIII
village	Paryzka Komuna	Hrebinka Raion	Poliove	ПВРУ 1037-VIII
village	Ulianovka	Hrebinka Raion	Pochaivka	ПВРУ 1037-VIII
village	Chapaievka	Dykanskyi	Dibrova	ПВРУ 1353-VIII
village	Komsomolske	Zinkiv Raion	Pirky	ПВРУ 1037-VIII
village	Khalturyne	Karlivka Raion	Martynivka	ПВРУ 1353-VIII
village	Chervonoznamianka	Karlivka Raion	Znamenka	ПВРУ 1353-VIII
village	Zhovtneve	Kobeliaky Raion	Panske	ПВРУ 1377-VIII
village	Kalinine	Kobeliaky Raion	Bilokonivka	ПВРУ 1353-VIII
village	Kirove	Kobeliaky Raion	Lebedyne	ПВРУ 1353-VIII
village	Kotovske	Kobeliaky Raion	Vitrova Balka	ПВРУ 1377-VIII
village	Radianske	Kobeliaky Raion	Prydniprianske	ПВРУ 1353-VIII
village	Sverdlovske	Kobeliaky Raion	Vyshneve	ПВРУ 1353-VIII
village	Frunze	Kobeliaky Raion	Myrne	ПВРУ 1037-VIII
village	Chapaieve	Kobeliaky Raion	Stepove	ПВРУ 1353-VIII
village	Zhovtneve	Kozelshchyna Raion	Kashchivka	ПВРУ 1353-VIII
village	Komintern	Kozelshchyna Raion	Pavlyky	ПВРУ 1377-VIII
village	Chapaievka	Kozelshchyna Raion	Maltsi	ПВРУ 1377-VIII
village	Dzerzhynske	Kremenchuk Raion	Prydniprianske	ПВРУ 1353-VIII
village	Chervona Znamianka	Kremenchuk Raion	Nova Znamianka	ПВРУ 1353-VIII
village	Komsomolske	Lokhvytsia Raion	Pototskivshchyna	ПВРУ 1037-VIII
village	Lutsenky	Lokhvytsia Raion	Zhabky	ПВРУ 1377-VIII
village	Proletar	Lokhvytsia Raion	Stepne	ПВРУ 1353-VIII
city	Chervonozavodske	Lokhvytsia Raion	Zavodske	ПВРУ 984-VIII
village	Zhovtneve	Lubny Raion	Pokrovske	ПВРУ 1037-VIII
village	Leninove	Novi Sanzhary Raion	Luhove	ПВРУ 1353-VIII
village	Oborona Rad	Novi Sanzhary Raion	Raiduzhne	ПВРУ 1353-VIII
village	Kuibysheve	Orzhytsia Raion	Vyshneve	ПВРУ 1353-VIII
village	Kirove	Poltava Raion	Palchykivka	ПВРУ 1353-VIII
village	Krotenky	Poltava Raion	Semianivka	ПВРУ 1353-VIII
village	Kulykove	Poltava Raion	Kolomatske	ПВРУ 1353-VIII
village	Ulianivka	Poltava Raion	Petrashivka	ПВРУ 1377-VIII
selyshche	Zhovtneve	Reshetylivka Raion	Pokrovske	ПВРУ 1353-VIII
village	Frunzivka	Reshetylivka Raion	Kapustiany	ПВРУ 1377-VIII
village	Zhovtneve	Semenivka Raion	Rokyty	ПВРУ 1377-VIII
village	Chapaievka	Semenivka Raion	Malynivka	ПВРУ 1037-VIII
village	Petrivka	Khorol Raion	Vyshneve	ПВРУ 1353-VIII
village	Ulianivka	Khorol Raion	Kniazha Luka	ПВРУ 1377-VIII
urban-type settlement	Artemivka	Chutove Raion	Skorokhodove	ПВРУ 1037-VIII
village	Zhovtneve	Chutove Raion	Pavlivka	ПВРУ 1377-VIII
village	Chapaieve	Chutove Raion	Petrivka	ПВРУ 1377-VIII
village	Chervone	Chutove Raion	Shchaslyve	ПВРУ 1353-VIII
village	Shchorsivka	Chutove Raion	Stepove	ПВРУ 1353-VIII
village	Kuibysheve	Shyshaky Raion	Pokrovske	ПВРУ 1374-VIII
village	Kolhospna Hora	Komsomolsk city council	Hora	ПВРУ 1353-VIII
city	Komsomolsk	Komsomolsk city council	Horishni Plavni	ПВРУ 1377-VIII

=== Rivne Oblast ===
Type	Old name	Raion	New name	References
village	Chervone	Dubrovytsia Raion	Ostrivtsi	ПВРУ 1377-VIII
village	Radianske	Mlyniv Raion	Piannie	ПВРУ 1353-VIII
village	Zhovtneve	Radyvyliv Raion	Nova Pliasheva	ПВРУ 1377-VIII
village	Iskra	Rivne Raion	Novozhukiv	ПВРУ 1377-VIII
city	Kuznetsovsk	Kuznetsovsk city council	Varash	ПВРУ 1377-VIII

=== Sumy Oblast ===
Type	Old name	Raion	New name	References
urban-type settlement	Zhovtneve	Bilopillia Raion	Mykolaivka	ПВРУ 1377-VIII
village	Petrivske	Bilopillia Raion	Meliachykha	ПВРУ 1377-VIII
village	Radianske	Bilopillia Raion	Bolotyshyne	ПВРУ 1037-VIII
selyshche	Zhovtneve	Buryn Raion	Kopylove	ПВРУ 1377-VIII
village	Volodymyrivka	Velyka Pysarivka Raion	Vasylivka	ПВРУ 1377-VIII
village	Vorovske	Velyka Pysarivka Raion	Ridne	ПВРУ 1377-VIII
village	Komsomolets	Velyka Pysarivka Raion	Myrne	ПВРУ 1377-VIII
village	Petrivske	Velyka Pysarivka Raion	Marakuchka	ПВРУ 1037-VIII
village	Radianske	Velyka Pysarivka Raion	Ponomarenky	ПВРУ 1377-VIII
urban-type settlement	Chervone	Hlukhiv Raion	Esman	ПВРУ 1377-VIII
village	Zhovtneve	Konotop Raion	Kurylivka	ПВРУ 1377-VIII
village	Krupske	Konotop Raion	Bazylivka	ПВРУ 1377-VIII
village	Leninske	Krolevets Raion	Spaske	ПВРУ 1037-VIII
village	Petrivka	Krolevets Raion	Morozivka	ПВРУ 1377-VIII
village	Chervonyi Ranok	Krolevets Raion	Bozhok	ПВРУ 1377-VIII
village	Zhovtneve	Lebedyn Raion	Stepove	ПВРУ 1037-VIII
village	Komisarivka	Lebedyn Raion	Yasnopillia	ПВРУ 1037-VIII
village	Leninske	Lebedyn Raion	Myrne	ПВРУ 1037-VIII
village	Radianske	Lebedyn Raion	Sloboda	ПВРУ 1037-VIII
village	Beieve-Komuna	Lypova Dolyna Raion	Melnykove	ПВРУ 1377-VIII
selyshche	Kalininske	Lypova Dolyna Raion	Sukha Hrun	ПВРУ 1377-VIII
village	Zhovtneve	Nedryhailiv Raion	Sosnivka	ПВРУ 1037-VIII
selyshche	Kirove	Nedryhailiv Raion	Peretichky	ПВРУ 1037-VIII
village	Zhovtneve	Okhtyrka Raion	Shchomy	ПВРУ 1377-VIII
selyshche	Illichivka	Okhtyrka Raion	Myrne	ПВРУ 1037-VIII
village	Pioner	Okhtyrka Raion	Soborne	ПВРУ 1377-VIII
village	Oktiabrske	Putyvl Raion	Zarichne	ПВРУ 1037-VIII
village	Hryshyne	Romny Raion	Havrylivka	ПВРУ 1377-VIII
village	Kim	Seredyna-Buda Raion	Chetvertakove	ПВРУ 1037-VIII
selyshche	Krasnyi Prohres	Seredyna-Buda Raion	Prohres	ПВРУ 1037-VIII
selyshche	Sverdlove	Seredyna-Buda Raion	Zarichne	ПВРУ 1037-VIII
village	Dzerzhynske	Sumy Raion	Luhove	ПВРУ 1037-VIII
village	Zhovtneve	Sumy Raion	Vyshneve	ПВРУ 1037-VIII
village	Leninske	Sumy Raion	Stepne	ПВРУ 1377-VIII
selyshche	Proletarske	Sumy Raion	Marine	ПВРУ 1037-VIII
selyshche	Radianske	Sumy Raion	Mala Korchakivka	ПВРУ 1037-VIII
village	Frunzeнка	Sumy Raion	Dibrova	ПВРУ 1037-VIII
village	Chervone	Sumy Raion	Stare Selo	ПВРУ 1377-VIII
village	Chervonopraporne	Sumy Raion	Yablunivka	ПВРУ 1037-VIII
selyshche	Radhospne	Trostianets Raion	Vynohradne	ПВРУ 1037-VIII
village	Korotchenkove	Shostka Raion	Pohrebky	ПВРУ 1037-VIII
village	Komintern	Yampil Raion	Lisne	ПВРУ 1037-VIII
village	Oktiabrshchyna	Yampil Raion	Olhyne	ПВРУ 1377-VIII
village	Komsomolska Komuna	Konotop city council	Kalynivka	ПВРУ 1037-VIII

=== Ternopil Oblast ===
Type	Old name	Raion	New name	References
village	Radianske	Kremenets Raion	Velyki Mlynivtsi	ПВРУ 825-VIII
village	Zhovtneve	Ternopil Raion	Soborne	ПВРУ 984-VIII

=== Vinnytsia Oblast ===
Type	Old name	Raion	New name	References
village	Chervone	Bar Raion	Hrabivtsi	ПВРУ 1377-VIII
village	Krasne	Vinnytsia Raion	Makhnivka	ПВРУ 1377-VIII
village	Leninka	Zhmerynka Raion	Varzhynka	ПВРУ 1377-VIII
village	Chapaievka	Zhmerynka Raion	Mali Korostivtsi	ПВРУ 1377-VIII
village	Zhovtneve	Kalynivka Raion	Vyshneve	ПВРУ 1353-VIII
village	Kirovka	Kalynivka Raion	Myrne	ПВРУ 1353-VIII
village	Komunarivka	Kalynivka Raion	Berezhany	ПВРУ 1353-VIII
village	Chervona Trybunivka	Kalynivka Raion	Zabara	ПВРУ 1353-VIII
village	Komsomolske	Koziatyn Raion	Makhnivka	ПВРУ 1353-VIII
village	Radianske	Kryzhopil Raion	Kniazha Krynytsia	ПВРУ 1377-VIII
village	Sverdlivka	Lypovets Raion	Penkivka	ПВРУ 1353-VIII
selyshche	Chervona Zirka	Lypovets Raion	Mala Bila	ПВРУ 1037-VIII
village	Radianske	Lityn Raion	Litynski Khutory	ПВРУ 1377-VIII
village	Leninska Sloboda	Murovani Kurylivtsi Raion	Kamianetski Khutory	ПВРУ 1353-VIII
village	Petrivka	Murovani Kurylivtsi Raion	Berliadka	ПВРУ 1377-VIII
village	Kirove	Nemyriv Raion	Rachky	ПВРУ 1377-VIII
village	Marksove	Nemyriv Raion	Monastyrske	ПВРУ 1377-VIII
village	Zhovtneve	Pohrebyshche Raion	Popivtsi	ПВРУ 1353-VIII
village	Chapaievka	Pohrebyshche Raion	Nadrossia	ПВРУ 1353-VIII
village	Rusava-Radianka	Tomashpil Raion	Rusava	ПВРУ 1353-VIII
village	Zhdanivka	Khmilnyk Raion	Viitivtsi	ПВРУ 1377-VIII
village	Proletar	Khmilnyk Raion	Dubyna	ПВРУ 1353-VIII
village	Chervona Volodymyrivka	Khmilnyk Raion	Volodymyrivka	ПВРУ 1353-VIII
village	Chervona Hreblia	Chechelnyk Raion	Popova Hreblia	ПВРУ 1377-VIII
selyshche	Petrovske	Sharhorod Raion	Syniozhupannyky	ПВРУ 1377-VIII
village	Chapaieve	Sharhorod Raion	Novi Khomenky	ПВРУ 1374-VIII
village	Radianske	Yampil Raion	Nechuivka	ПВРУ 984-VIII

=== Volyn Oblast ===
Type	Old name	Raion	New name	References
village	Zhovtneve	Volodymyr-Volynskyi Raion	Susval	ПВРУ 1377-VIII
village	Maiaky	Lutsk Raion	Kniahynynok	ПВРУ 1377-VIII
urban-type settlement	Zhovtneve	Novovvolynsk city council	Blahodatne	ПВРУ 1353-VIII

=== Zakarpattia Oblast ===
Type	Old name	Raion	New name	References
village	Komsomolsk	Tiachiv Raion	Nimetska Mokra	ПВРУ 984-VIII
village	Zhovtneve	Khust Raion	Zaberezh	ПВРУ 1467-VIII

=== Zaporizhzhia Oblast ===
Type	Old name	Raion	New name	References
village	Karla Marksa	Berdiansk Raion	Troitske	ПВРУ 1353-VIII
village	Lunacharske	Berdiansk Raion	Azovske	ПВРУ 1377-VIII
village	Chervonoarmiiske	Vasylivka Raion	Dolynka	ПВРУ 1377-VIII
village	Biloritske	Vesele Raion	Mala Mykailivka	ПВРУ 1377-VIII
village	Zhovtneve	Vilniansk Raion	Verbove	ПВРУ 1377-VIII
village	Kirova	Vilniansk Raion	Semenenkove	ПВРУ 1377-VIII
village	Kirovske	Vilniansk Raion	Mala Kupriianivka	ПВРУ 1377-VIII
village	Uralske	Vilniansk Raion	Shyroke	ПВРУ 1377-VIII
village	Chervonokozatske	Vilniansk Raion	Helendzhyk	ПВРУ 1377-VIII
village	Chapaievka	Vilniansk Raion	Tarasivka	ПВРУ 1353-VIII
village	Zhovtneve	Huliaipole Raion	Olenokostiantynivka	ПВРУ 1353-VIII
village	Komsomolske	Huliaipole Raion	Huliaipilske	ПВРУ 1353-VIII
village	Petrivka	Huliaipole Raion	Sviatopetrivka	ПВРУ 1353-VIII
village	Kirove	Zaporizhzhia Raion	Hurskoho	ПВРУ 984-VIII
village	Petrivske	Zaporizhzhia Raion	Zelenopillia	ПВРУ 1377-VIII
village	Radianske	Zaporizhzhia Raion	Pryvilne	ПВРУ 984-VIII
village	Urytske	Zaporizhzhia Raion	Zoriane	ПВРУ 984-VIII
village	Petrivske	Kamianka-Dniprovska Raion	Stepove	ПВРУ 1377-VIII
village	Shliakh Illicha	Kamianka-Dniprovska Raion	Shliakhove	ПВРУ 1377-VIII
village	Desiatyrichia Zhovtnia	Kuibysheve Raion	Berezhne	ПВРУ 1353-VIII
urban-type settlement	Kuibysheve	Kuibysheve Raion	Bilmak	ПВРУ 1353-VIII
village	Leninske	Kuibysheve Raion	Druzhne	ПВРУ 1353-VIII
village	Sovietske	Melitopol Raion	Voloshkove	ПВРУ 1037-VIII
village	Zhovtneve	Mykhailivka Raion	Tarsalak	ПВРУ 1377-VIII
selyshche	Dymytrove	Orikhiv Raion	Zarichne	ПВРУ 1377-VIII
selyshche	Kalinina	Orikhiv Raion	Kalynivka	ПВРУ 1353-VIII
village	Kirove	Orikhiv Raion	Tavriiske	ПВРУ 1353-VIII
village	Chervonyi Zhovten	Orikhiv Raion	Zhovtenke	ПВРУ 1037-VIII
village	Ulianovka	Polohy Raion	Ozherelne	ПВРУ 1377-VIII
village	Chubarivka	Polohy Raion	Fedorivka	ПВРУ 1377-VIII
village	Chapaievka	Polohy Raion	Voskresenka	ПВРУ 1377-VIII
selyshche	Zhovtneve	Priazovske Raion	Domuzly	ПВРУ 1377-VIII
village	Kolarivka	Prymorsk Raion	Bolharka	ПВРУ 1377-VIII
village	Partyzany	Prymorsk Raion	Novopavlivka	ПВРУ 1377-VIII
village	Zhovtneve	Rozivka Raion	Forois	ПВРУ 1353-VIII
village	Karla Libknekhta	Rozivka Raion	Zoria	ПВРУ 1353-VIII
village	Proletarske	Rozivka Raion	Novozlatopil	ПВРУ 1377-VIII
village	Urytske	Rozivka Raion	Sviatotroitske	ПВРУ 1377-VIII
village	Zhovtneve	Tokmak Raion	Pokrovske	ПВРУ 1353-VIII
village	Kirove	Tokmak Raion	Lahidne	ПВРУ 1353-VIII
village	Komsomolske	Tokmak Raion	Stepove	ПВРУ 1353-VIII
village	Chapaievka	Tokmak Raion	Blahodatne	ПВРУ 1353-VIII
selyshche	Yuvileine	Tokmak Raion	Zoriane	ПВРУ 1353-VIII
village	Panfilivka	Chernihivka Raion	Iline	ПВРУ 1377-VIII
village	Petrovske	Chernihivka Raion	Petropavlivka	ПВРУ 1353-VIII
village	Kuibysheve	Yakymivka Raion	Viazivka	ПВРУ 984-VIII
village	Leninske	Yakymivka Raion	Myrne	ПВРУ 1037-VIII
village	Chervonoarmiiske	Yakymivka Raion	Tavriiske	ПВРУ 984-VIII

=== Zhytomyr Oblast ===
Type	Old name	Raion	New name	References
village	Chubarivka	Andrushivka Raion	Hrada	ПВРУ 984-VIII
village	Piatyrichka	Baranivka Raion	Hlynianka	ПВРУ 1377-VIII
village	Chervonopraporne	Baranivka Raion	Smolka	ПВРУ 1377-VIII
village	Radianske	Berdychiv Raion	Romanivka	ПВРУ 984-VIII
village	Chervona Zirka	Berdychiv Raion	Lisove	ПВРУ 984-VIII
urban-type settlement	Volodarsk-Volynskyi	Volodarsk-Volynskyi Raion	Khoroshiv	ПВРУ 984-VIII
village	Piatyrichka	Volodarsk-Volynskyi Raion	Zelenyi Hai	ПВРУ 1353-VIII
village	Dzerzhynsk	Yemilchyne Raion	Lisove	ПВРУ 984-VIII
village	Radianske	Korosten Raion	Vyshneve	ПВРУ 984-VIII
village	Shchorsivka	Korosten Raion	Biloshchytsi	ПВРУ 1377-VIII
urban-type settlement	Zhovtneve	Luhyny Raion	Myroliubiv	ПВРУ 1353-VIII
village	Chapaievka	Luhyny Raion	Mykolaivka	ПВРУ 1353-VIII
village	Leninske	Liubar Raion	Kvitneve	ПВРУ 984-VIII
village	Zhovtneve	Malyn Raion	Maklaivka	ПВРУ 1377-VIII
village	Krupske	Malyn Raion	Studen	ПВРУ 1377-VIII
village	Chervonyi Pluhatar	Malyn Raion	Kosnia	ПВРУ 1377-VIII
village	Zhovtneve	Olevsk Raion	Kalynivka	ПВРУ 1353-VIII
village	Komsomolske	Olevsk Raion	Pokrovske	ПВРУ 984-VIII
village	Zhovtneve	Popilnia Raion	Kvitneve	ПВРУ 984-VIII
selyshche	Radhospne	Popilnia Raion	Kornynske	ПВРУ 1353-VIII
village	Lenine	Radomyshl Raion	Stavky	ПВРУ 984-VIII
village	Zhovtneve	Ruzhyn Raion	Nova Chornorudka	ПВРУ 1353-VIII
urban-type settlement	Chervonoarmiisk	Chervonoarmiisk	Pulyny	ПВРУ 1377-VIII
village	Karla Marksa	Cherniakhiv Raion	Novi Zhadky	ПВРУ 1353-VIII

== See also ==
- List of streets renamed due to the 2022 Russian invasion of Ukraine
- List of renamed cities in Ukraine
