= Voskresenka =

Voskresenka is an East Slavic placename. It may refer to several places:

== Russia ==
- Voskresenka, Altai Krai
- Voskresenka (Bagansky District), Novosibirsk Oblast
- Voskresenka, Republic of Bashkortostan

== Ukraine ==
- Voskresenka, a district of Kyiv
- Voskresenka, Polohy Raion, Zaporizhzhia Oblast
  - Voskresenka rural hromada, a hromada of Ukraine with its center in the village
