= Zhovtneve =

Zhovtneve (Ukrainian: Жовтневе, October) is a common name for a populated settlement in Ukraine. All of those were or are to be renamed according to the law prohibiting names of Communist origin. It may refer to:

== Localities and subdivisions formerly named Zhovtneve ==
- Dmytrivka, Kyiv Oblast
- Blahodatne, Volyn Oblast
- Myroliubiv, Zhytomyr Oblast
- Vitovka Raion (formerly Zhovtneve Raion), Mykolaiv Oblast
- Zaberezh, Khust Raion, Zakarpattia Oblast

- Zhovtneve, Mykolaiv Oblast, a historic neighborhood in Mykolaiv
