= Promin (disambiguation) =

Promin is a sulfone chemical compound.

Promin may also refer to:

== Places ==
- Promin, Mykolaiv Oblast, a village in Ukraine
- Promin, Mykolaiv Raion, Mykolaiv Oblast, a rural settlement in Ukraine

== Sports ==
- FC Promin Poltava, a former Soviet Ukrainian association football team
- FC Promin Sambir, former name of FC Sambir, a Ukrainian association football team

== Other uses ==
- Radio Promin, a Ukrainian national radio station
