= Haidamatske =

Haidamatske can mean

- Haidamatske, Dnipropetrovsk Oblast, a rural locality in Dnipropetrovsk Oblast, Ukraine
- Haidamatske, Kirovohrad Oblast, formerly Yelyzavethradka, a rural locality in Kirovohrad Oblast, Ukraine
- Haidamatske, the former name of the urban-type settlement of Arbuzynka, Mykolaiv Oblast, Ukraine
