= Lypske =

Urban locality in Donetsk Oblast, Ukraine

Lypske Липське
- Rural settlement
- Interactive map of Lypske
- Location of Lypske within Donetsk Oblast#Location of Lypske within Ukraine Lypske (Ukraine)
- Coordinates: 48°04′55″N 38°08′49″E
- Country: Ukraine
- Oblast: Donetsk Oblast
- Raion: Donetsk Raion
- Hromada: Makiivka urban hromada

Area
  - Total: 0.72 km^{2} (0.28 sq mi)
- Elevation: 188 m (617 ft)

Population (2022)
  - Total: 886
  - Density: 1,200/km^{2} (3,200/sq mi)
- Time zone: UTC+2 (EET)
  - Summer (DST): UTC+3 (EEST)
- Postal code: 86189
- Area code: +380 6232

Lypske (Ukrainian: Липське) or Krasnyi Oktiabr (Ukrainian: Красний Октябр; Russian: Красный Октябрь) is a rural settlement in Makiivka urban hromada, Donetsk Raion in Donetsk Oblast of Ukraine. Population: 886 (2022 estimate).

== Geography ==
Lypske is located 28 kilometres (17 mi) from the oblast center Donetsk, 20 kilometres (12 mi) from Makiivka, 10 kilometres (6.2 mi) from Khartsyzk, and 5 kilometres (3.1 mi) from Nyzhnia Krynka. The town has an area of 0.72 square kilometres (0.28 mi^{2}).

== History ==
Krasnyi Oktiabr received urban-type settlement status in 1957. By 1959, it had an approximate population of 1,900 people. Its population steadily declined throughout the remainder of the 20th century.

In 2010, the school in Krasnyi Oktiabr was closed. Krasnyi Oktiabr was occupied by Russian proxies during the war in Donbas that began in 2014. On July 20, 2016, the Verkhovna Rada (parliament) of Ukraine officially renamed the settlement to Lypske.

In the pre-2020, Soviet-era administrative divisions of Ukraine, the town was subordinated to Nyzhnia Krynka, which in turn was subordinated to the Makiivka city council. On June 12, 2020, the Verkhovna Rada designated Lypske as part of Makiivka urban hromada.

== Economy ==
Lypske is a mining town, with its economy heavily associated with the Yasinovskaya-Glubokaya Mine in Makiivka.

== Demographics ==
Population census

Year	Pop.	±% p.a.
1959	1,900	—
1970	1,200	−4.09%
1979	1,100	−0.96%

Year	Pop.	±% p.a.
1999	1,100	+0.00%
2001	1,017	−3.85%
2022	886	−0.65%

As of the 2001 Ukrainian census, the town had a population of 1,017. Their native languages were:

- Ukrainian 32.91%
- Russian 66.50%
- Belarusian 0.1%
