= Kartushyne =

Urban locality in Luhansk Oblast, Ukraine

Kartushyne Картушине
- Rural settlement
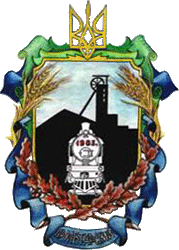
- Flag Seal

- Location of Proletarskyi Kartushyne (Ukraine)
- Coordinates: 48°08′00″N 39°15′22″E
- Country: Ukraine
- Oblast: Luhansk Oblast
- Raion: Rovenky Raion
- Hromada: Rovenky urban hromada
- Elevation: 279 m (915 ft)

Population (2022)
  - Total: 1,550
- Postal code: 94779
- Area code: +380 6433

Kartushyne (Ukrainian: Картушине) or Proletarskyi (Ukrainian: Пролетарський; Russian: Пролетарский) is a rural settlement in Rovenky urban hromada, Rovenky Raion of Luhansk Oblast (region), Ukraine. Population: 1,550 (2022 estimate)

== Geography ==
Proletarskyi is located in the southern part of Luhansk Oblast, in the historical and economic Donbas region of Eastern Ukraine. It is located 6 miles (9.7 km) west-northwest of Rovenky.

== History ==
Proletarskyi was founded in 1922 near the "Kartushyne" railway station. It received urban-type settlement status in 1938.

It was traditionally a coal mining location, but by 2008, Saul B. Cohen wrote that the coal mines had been exhausted, and that now the workers worked in other nearby mines.

Proletarskyi was taken over by Russian proxy forces during the war in Donbas that began in 2014. In 2016, the Verkhovna Rada of Ukraine issued an edict renaming it to Kartushyne in accordance with decommunization laws.
