= Tatsyne =

Urban locality in Luhansk Oblast, Ukraine

Tatsyne Тацине
- Rural settlement
- Location of Tatsyne Tatsyne (Ukraine)
- Coordinates: 48°03′56″N 39°12′43″E
- Country: Ukraine
- Oblast: Luhansk Oblast
- Raion: Rovenky Raion
- Hromada: Rovenky urban hromada
- Elevation: 191 m (627 ft)

Population (2022)
  - Total: 251
- Postal code: 94790
- Area code: +380 6433

Tatsyne (Ukrainian: Тацине; Russian: Тацино) is a rural settlement in Rovenky urban hromada, Rovenky Raion of Luhansk Oblast (region), Ukraine. Population: 251 (2022 estimate)
