= Kinski Rozdory =

Kinski Rozdory Кінські Роздори
- Village
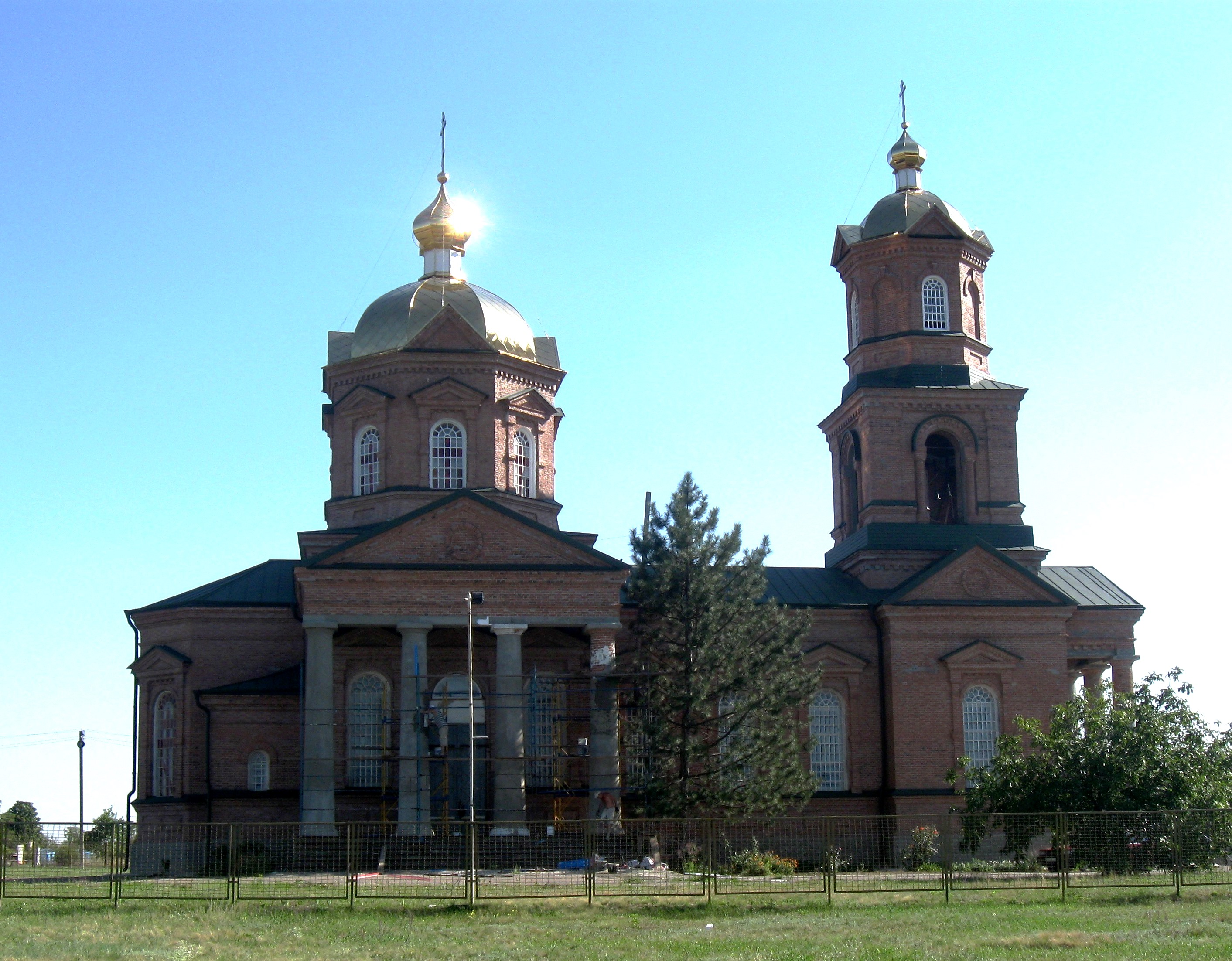
- Transfiguration Church in Kinski Rozdory

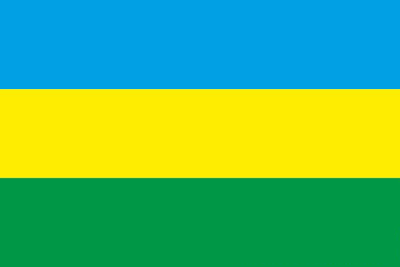
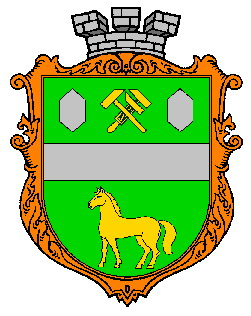
- Flag Coat of arms

- Location of Kinski Rozdory within Zaporizhzhia Oblast Kinski Rozdory (Ukraine)
- Coordinates: 47°24′42″N 36°24′55″E
- Country: Ukraine
- Oblast: Zaporizhzhia Oblast
- Raion: Polohy
- Hromada: Voskresenska
- Founded: 1771

Population (2001)
  - Total: 3,113
- Time zone: UTC+2
  - Summer (DST): UTC+3 (EEST)
- Postal code: 70650 and 70651

Kinski Rozdory (Ukrainian: Кінські Роздори) is a village (selo) in Polohy Raion, Zaporizhzhia Oblast, Ukraine. It belongs to the Voskresenska rural hromada, one of the hromadas of Ukraine. As of 2001, it had a population of 3,113. The village is currently occupied by Russian forces.

== Etymology ==
The name translates to "Horse Quarrels" in Ukrainian.

== History ==
There are numerous burial mounds in the area around Kinski Rozdory, including one from the Sarmatian civilization that may date from the 2nd century BC to the 2nd century AD.

Kinski Rozdory was founded in 1771 as a military settlement. The population grew with an influx of migrants from other parts of what is now Ukraine.

During the Russian Revolution, the town was occupied by the Estonian Division of the Revolutionary Insurgent Army of Ukraine.

During World War II, Kinski Rozdory was occupied by Nazi Germany. 267 Red Army soldiers died to liberate the village. A monument was later built to them.

As a result of the Russian invasion of Ukraine in 2022, Kinski Rozdory was occupied by the Russian Federation. In June 2022, a goat set off multiple mines in the village, injuring Russian soldiers nearby.

== Economy ==
There is a brick factory in Kinski Rozdory.

== In popular culture ==
The Ukrainian Black Army song "Kins'ki Rozdory" is said to be named after the city.

== Demographics ==
Native language composition according to the 2001 Ukrainian census:

Native languages (2001)
	percent
Ukrainian	97.2%
Russian	2.3%
Moldovan	0.2%
Armenian	0.1%
others	0.2%
