= Hirnyk, Luhansk Oblast =

Urban locality in Luhansk Oblast, Ukraine

Hirnyk Гірник
- Rural settlement
- Location within Luhansk Oblast Location within Ukraine
- Coordinates: 48.0683°N 39.1919°E
- Country: Ukraine
- Oblast: Luhansk Oblast
- Raion: Rovenky Raion
- Hromada: Rovenky urban hromada

Population
  - Estimate (2022): 769
- Time zone: UTC+2 (EET)
  - Summer (DST): UTC+3 (EEST)
- Postal Code: 94791

Hirnyk (Ukrainian: Гірник pronounced [ɦirˈnɪk], Russian: Горняк) is a rural settlement in Rovenky urban hromada, Rovenky Raion of Luhansk Oblast (region) in eastern Ukraine. Population: 769 (2022 estimate), 795 (2013 est.).

Since early 2014, the settlement has been administered as a part of the de facto Luhansk People's Republic.
