= Kartushyne, Luhansk Oblast =

Coordinates: 48°11′03″N 39°15′13″E

Kartushyne (Ukrainian: Карту́шине) is a village in Ukraine, located in Rovenky urban hromada, Rovenky Raion, Luhansk Oblast. It has a population of 951 people.

== Demographics ==
According to the 2001 Ukrainian census, the village had a population of 951 people, of whom 90.85% spoke Ukrainian as their native language and 9.15% natively spoke Russian.
