= Rovenky urban hromada =

Rovenky urban hromada Ровеньківська міська громада
- Hromada
- Interactive map of Rovenky urban hromada
- Country: Ukraine
- Oblast: Luhansk
- Raion: Rovenky
- Settlements: 24
- Cities: 1
- Villages: 18
- Towns: 5

Rovenky urban hromada (Ukrainian: Ровеньківська міська громада) is a hromada of Ukraine, located in Rovenky Raion, Luhansk Oblast. Its administrative center is the city Rovenky.

The hromada contains 24 settlements: 1 city (Rovenky), 5 rural settlements (Hirnyk, Kartushyne, Lyubymivka, Mykhailivka, Tatsyne), and 18 villages:

- Blahivka
- Bobrykove
- Verbivka
- Vyshneve
- Hrybuvakha
- Yehorivka
- Zaliznychne
- Kartushyne
- Klunikove
- Koshari
- Lozy
- Mechetka
- Novodarivka
- Novokrasnivka
- Novoukrainka
- Platonivka
- Rebrykove
- Ulyanivka

== See also ==
- List of hromadas of Ukraine
