= Voskresenka, Republic of Bashkortostan =

Voskresenka Воскресенка
- Village
- Location within Bashkortostan Location within Russia
- Coordinates: 55°05′N 56°17′E
- Country: Russia
- Region: Bashkortostan
- District: Blagoveshchensky District
- Time zone: UTC+5:00

Voskresenka (Russian: Воскресенка) is a rural locality (a village) in Ilyino-Polyansky Selsoviet, Blagoveshchensky District, Bashkortostan, Russia. The population was 17 as of 2010. There are 2 streets.

== Geography ==
Voskresenka is located 29 km northeast of Blagoveshchensk (the district's administrative centre) by road. Pokrovskoye is the nearest rural locality.
