= Pokrovske, Holovanivsk Raion, Kirovohrad Oblast =

Rural locality in Kirovohrad Oblast, Ukraine

Pokrovske Покровське
- Village
- Location within Ukraine Kirovohrad Oblast Location within Ukraine
- Coordinates: 48°16′43″N 29°48′47″E
- Country: Ukraine
- Oblast: Kirovohrad Oblast
- Raion: Holovanivsk Raion
- Elevation: 168 m (551 ft)

Population (2001 census)
  - Total: 728
- Time zone: UTC+2 (EET)
  - Summer (DST): UTC+3 (EEST)
- Postal code: 26324
- Area code: +380 5254

Pokrovske (Ukrainian: Покровське) is a village in Holovanivsk Raion of Kirovohrad Oblast, Ukraine, located at 48°16′43″N 029°48′47″E. It belongs to Haivoron urban hromada, one of the hromadas of Ukraine.

Until 18 July 2020, Pokrovske belonged to Haivoron Raion. The raion was abolished in July 2020 as part of the administrative reform of Ukraine, which reduced the number of raions of Kirovohrad Oblast to four. The area of Haivoron Raion was merged into Holovanivsk Raion.

== History ==
In Soviet times and until 2016, the village was called Kotovka.
