= Voskresenka, Altai Krai =

Voskresenka Воскресенка
- Village
- Location within Altai Krai Location within Russia
- Coordinates: 53°54′N 85°00′E
- Country: Russia
- Region: Altai Krai
- District: Zarinsky District
- Time zone: UTC+7:00

Voskresenka (Russian: Воскресенка) is a rural locality (a selo) and the administrative center of Voskresensky Selsoviet of Zarinsky District, Altai Krai, Russia. The population was 399 as of 2016. There are 7 streets.

== Geography ==
Voskresenka is located on the north of the center of the Zarinsky District, 32 km north of Zarinsk (the district's administrative centre) by road. Shiroky Lug is the nearest rural locality.
