= Rovenky =

City in Luhansk Oblast, Ukraine

Rovenky Ровеньки
- City
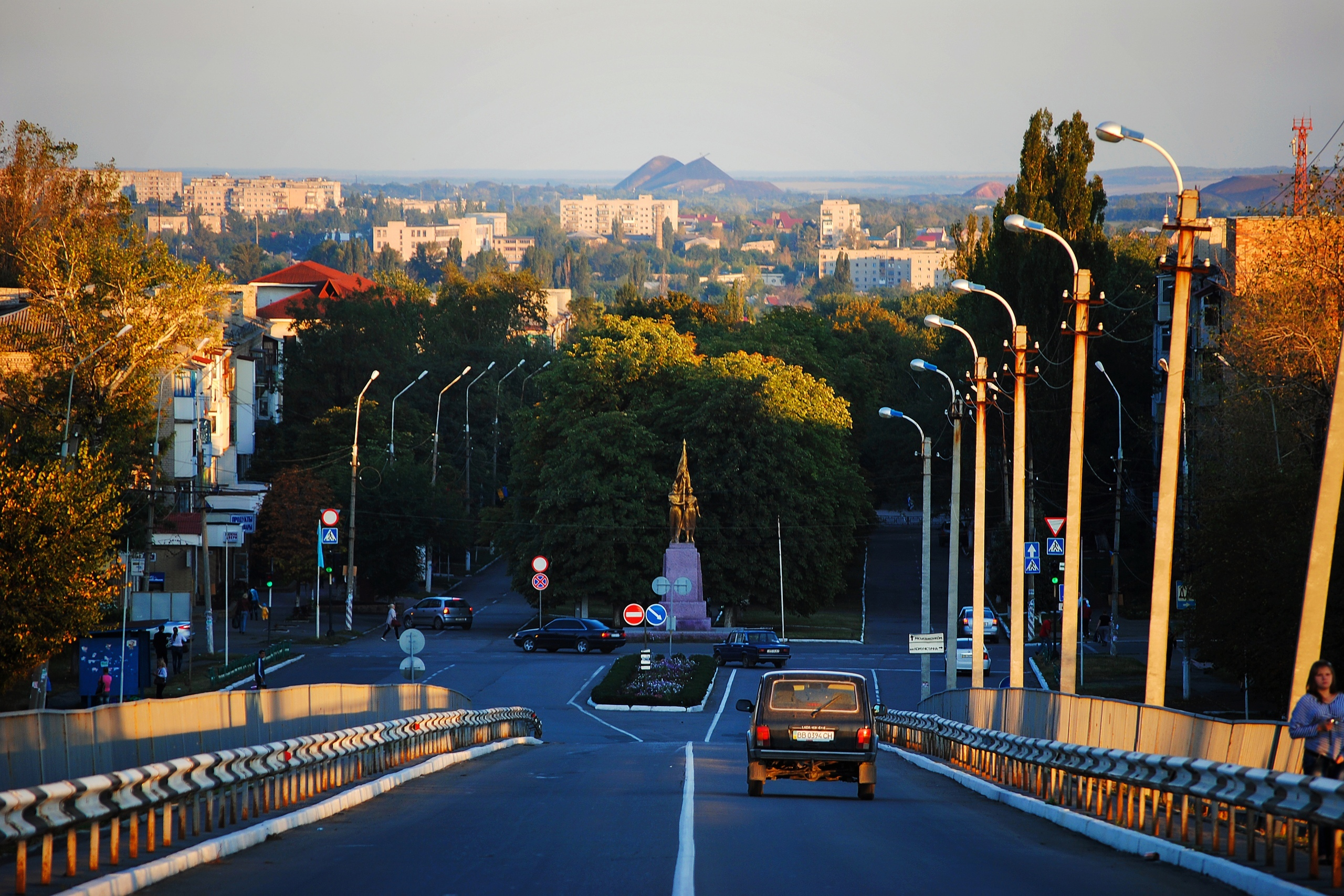

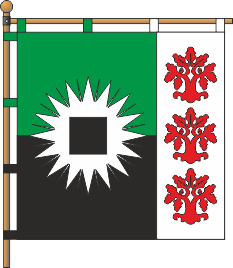
- Flag Coat of arms
- Interactive map of Rovenky
- Location within Ukraine Location within Luhansk Oblast
- Coordinates: 48°04′16″N 39°20′34″E
- Country: Ukraine
- Oblast: Luhansk Oblast
- Raion: Rovenky Raion
- Hromada: Rovenky urban hromada
- Founded: 1705
- City rights: 1934

Area
  - Total: 217 km^{2} (84 sq mi)
- Elevation: 296 m (971 ft)

Population (2022)
  - Total: 45,514
  - Density: 3,737/km^{2} (9,680/sq mi)
- Postal code: 94700—779
- Area code: +380-6433
- Climate: Dfb
- Website: rov.loga.gov.ua

Rovenky (Ukrainian: Ровеньки, IPA: [rɔʋenʲˈkɪ]; Russian: Ровеньки, romanized: Rovenki) is a coal mining city in Rovenky Raion, Luhansk Oblast (region), in eastern Ukraine. Residence of Rovenky urban hromada. Prior to 2020, it was incorporated as a city of oblast significance. Population: 45,514 (2022 estimate); 47,852 (2013 est.). Including the surrounding villages, the total population is close to 84,000 (as of 2011).

Rovenky came under control of pro-Russian separatists in early 2014, and was incorporated into the Luhansk People's Republic (LPR). Since 2022, Russia has claimed the city as part of their LPR territory following its declared annexation of the region.

== Geography ==
Rovenky is located in Luhansk oblast, in the eastern Donbas region of Ukraine, and Rovenky is in the southern part of the oblast. It is 60 kilometres (37 mi) from the region center, Luhansk. There are a number of villages near Rovenky, including the following: Djerzhinskyi, Tasenovskiy, Nagolno-Tarasovskyi, and Bolshekamenskiy. There are numerous coal mines located in the Rovenky, in addition to the steppes. There is also a sizable forest in the center of Rovenky, a few lakes, and a train station. Rovenky is very close to the Ukrainian-Russian border.

== History ==
Rovenky was founded in 1705, and was incorporated as a city in 1934. By the order of Peter I, 49 Cossack villages were burned and destroyed in September 1708, including Rovenky. The freed Cossacks fled from Peter I into an area now referred to as the "Wild Field." Some settled in a place near a river and it was named after the abandoned native village - Rovenek. In 1793, Count Vasily Orlor became the owner of the settlement who later became the Cossack chieftain. In 1829, the first literacy school was opened and the first primary school was opened in 1852. At this point, the residents of Rovenky mostly worked the land, raised cattle, and bred sheep.

During the Ukrainian War of Independence, from 1917 to 1920, it passed between various factions. Afterwards, it was administratively part of the Donets Governorate of Ukraine. A local newspaper has been published in the city since October 1930.

During World War II, Rovenky was occupied by Nazi Germany. A group of the underground anti-fascist Komsomol (Communist youth) organization Young Guard worked there.

During the 1960s and 1970s, there was much development in Rovenky. Many new buildings were built, including the apartment buildings now called "Shaktyorski," "Gagarin," and "Molodyozh"." In the 1990s, private businesses began to appear - trade, transportation, and customer services. The backbone of the community remained its coal enterprises, which account for 95% of all manufactured goods in the city.

Since early 2014, Rovenky has been controlled by the Luhansk People's Republic (LPR) and not by Ukrainian authorities. On 11 July 2014, alleged pro-Russia forces attacked a concentration of Ukrainian troops with "Grad" rockets, inflicted heavy damage and casualties to two motorized army brigades at Zelenopyllia south of this place. At least 19 Ukrainian soldiers were reported killed, and around 100 other wounded. Fighting was still ongoing by evening. It was later claimed that the rocket system used in the attack was the newer 9A52-4 "Tornado".

On 17 February 2015 Bellingcat Investigation Team conducted an independent investigation and stated that Zelenopillya had been fired on from the territory of the Russian Federation.

== Demographics ==
As of the Ukrainian Census of 2001:

Ethnicity

- Ukrainians: 63.6%
- Russians: 33.7%
- Belarusians: 1%

Language

- Russian: 79.8%
- Ukrainian: 19.7%
- Belarusian: 0.1%
- Armenian: 0.1%

== Education ==
There are 27 general secondary schools and gymnasiums in Rovenky and the surrounding villages. There are also three different colleges and two branches of local universities located in Rovenky - one from Luhansk and one from Donetsk. The Donetsk branch is located on the second floor of the technical-economic college. Rovenky also has two city libraries and each school has its own library. In addition, there are two musical schools, two art schools, and one sport school. Rovenky has a sport complex, "Yubilenie" and a house of culture. Both of these buildings have a big influence on the culture and sport education of the residents. Rovenky also has the stadium, "Avantgarde" where the football matches are held.

== Economy ==
The coal industry makes up the foundation of the economy. The largest enterprise is "DTEK Rovenky Antratsit," which includes seven local mines. The most famous mines are "Frunze," "Dzerzhinkskaya," and "Vakhruseva." There are three factories which focus on processing the coal. DTEK helps Rovenky develop and the miners benefit well from their work.

Rovenky also has light and food industries. There is also a shoe factory and a brewery in town. The production of jewelry from the firm, "Agat" is widely known in many countries.

== Culture ==
There are two television companies, "Nika-TV" and "RTV" and there are three newspapers, "Rovenkovsky Vesty," "Forward Rovenky," and "The Dialogue."

== Attractions ==
There is a Pamyati pogibshikh museum in the city (In Memory of Dead in English), which is a branch of the Krasnodon-based memorial complex Young Guard. It is located in the basement of the central hospital where the five members of the Young Guard spent their final days before they were killed. There is also the Common Grave of these five members of the Young Guard and a monument, erected in 1965 on the place where they were shot by the Nazis in 1943. In honor of the liberation of Rovenky, another monument was established in the forest at the place where there were mass executions.

== Notable people ==
- Fedir Lashchonov, retired Soviet-Ukrainian volleyball player, gold medalist at 1980 Olympic Games
- Heorhiy Shonin, Soviet-Ukrainian cosmonaut
- Andriy Sidelnikov, retired Soviet and Ukrainian football player
