= Voskresenka rural hromada =

Voskresenka rural hromada Воскресенська селищна громада
- Hromada
- Interactive map of Voskresenka rural hromada
- Country: Ukraine
- Oblast: Zaporizhzhia
- Raion: Polohy
- Admin. center: Voskresenka

Area
  - Total: 264.9 km^{2} (102.3 sq mi)

Population (2020)
  - Total: 5,362
  - Density: 20.24/km^{2} (52.43/sq mi)
- Settlements: 4
- Rural settlements: 1
- Villages: 3

Voskresenka rural hromada (Ukrainian: Воскресенська селищна громада) is a hromada of Ukraine, located in Polohy Raion, Zaporizhzhia Oblast. Its administrative center is the village of Voskresenka.

It has an area of 264.9 square kilometres (102.3 mi^{2}) and a population of 5,362, as of 2020.

The hromada contains 4 settlements, including 3 villages:

- Voskresenka
- Kinski Rozdory
- Lozove

And 1 rural-type settlement: Mahedove.

== Demographics ==
As of the 2001 Ukrainian census, the hromada had a population of 7,041, which decreased to 5,362 in 2020. The native language composition in 2001 was as follows:

Native languages (2001)
	percent
Ukrainian	96.7%
Russian	3.0%
Moldovan	0.1%
Armenian	0.1%
others	0.1%

== See also ==
- List of hromadas of Ukraine
