= Liubymivka, Rovenky Raion, Luhansk Oblast =

Urban locality in Luhansk Oblast, Ukraine

Liubymivka Любимівка
- Rural settlement
- Location of Dzerzhynskyi Liubymivka (Ukraine)
- Coordinates: 48°02′23″N 39°26′24″E
- Country: Ukraine
- Oblast: Luhansk Oblast
- Raion: Rovenky Raion
- Hromada: Rovenky urban hromada
- Elevation: 245 m (804 ft)

Population (2022)
  - Total: 8,578
- Postal code: 94789
- Area code: +380 6433

Liubymivka (Ukrainian: Любимівка) or Dzerzhynskyi (Ukrainian: Дзержинський; Russian: Дзержинский) is a rural settlement in Rovenky urban hromada, Rovenky Raion of Luhansk Oblast (region), Ukraine. Its population is 8,578 (2022 estimate)

== History ==
It was originally known as Liubymivka, until 1926, when it was renamed Dzerzhynskyi by the Soviet government in honor of Bolshevik revolutionary Felix Dzerzhinsky.

During World War II, the town was occupied by Nazi Germany between July 1942 and February 1943.

In 2016, the settlement was renamed Liubymivka as part of decommunization in Ukraine.
