= Nyzhnia Krynka =

Urban locality in Donetsk Oblast, Ukraine

Nyzhnia Krynka Нижня Кринка
- Rural settlement
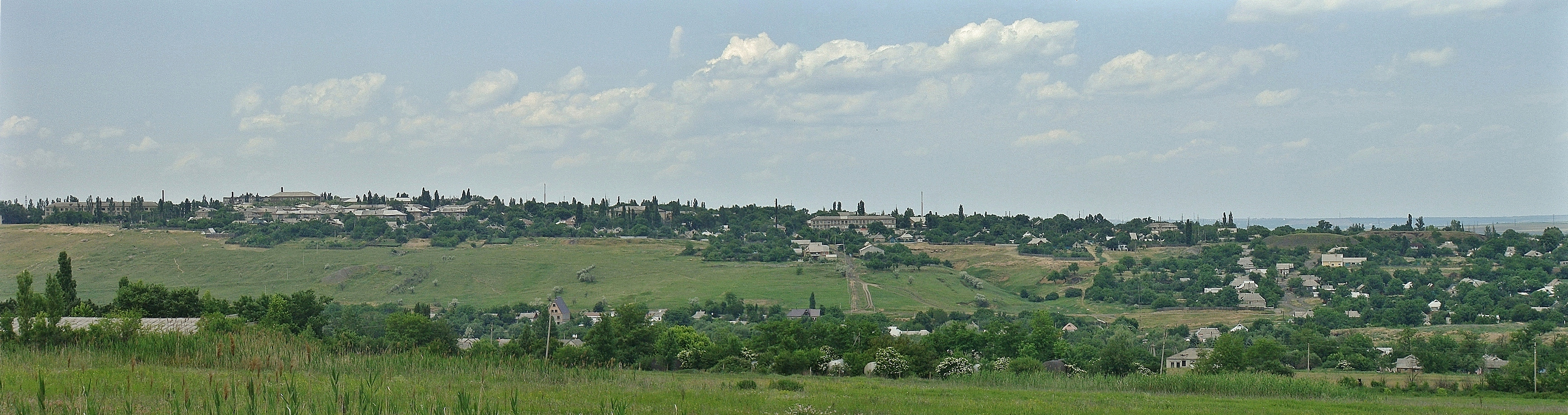

- Location of Nyzhnia Krynka within Donetsk Oblast#Location of Nyzhnia Krynka within Ukraine Nyzhnia Krynka (Ukraine)
- Coordinates: 48°06′52″N 38°09′38″E
- Country: Ukraine
- Oblast: Donetsk Oblast
- Raion: Donetsk Raion
- Hromada: Makiivka urban hromada
- Elevation: 124 m (407 ft)

Population (2022)
  - Total: 13,557
- Time zone: UTC+2 (EET)
  - Summer (DST): UTC+3 (EEST)
- Postal code: 86184-86188
- Area code: +380 6232

Nyzhnia Krynka (Ukrainian: Нижня Кринка) is a rural settlement in Makiivka urban hromada, Donetsk Raion in Donetsk Oblast of Ukraine. Population: 13,557 (2022 estimate).

== Demographics ==
Native language as of the Ukrainian Census of 2001:

- Ukrainian 33.29%
- Russian 65.96%
- Belarusian 0.2%
- Moldovan (Romanian) 0.04%
- Bulgarian, Armenian, Polish, and Romani 0.01%
