= Promin, Mykolaiv Oblast =

Promin Промiнь
- Coordinates: 46°53′47″N 32°44′19″E
- Country: Ukraine
- Oblast: Mykolaiv Oblast
- Raion: Bashtanka Raion
- Hromada: Horokhivske rural hromada
- Elevation: 53 m (174 ft)

Population
  - Total: 555
- Postal code: 57373
- Area code: +380 5162

Promin (Ukrainian: Промінь) is a village home to 555 inhabitants in Bashtanka Raion, Mykolaiv Oblast, Ukraine. It belongs to Horokhivske rural hromada, one of the hromadas of Ukraine.

== History ==
Until 2016, the village was called Chernovyi Promin (Червоний Промінь).

Until 18 July 2020, Promin belonged to Snihurivka Raion. The raion was abolished that day as part of the administrative reform of Ukraine, which reduced the number of raions of Mykolaiv Oblast to four. The area of Snihurivka Raion was merged into Bashtanka Raion.

During the 2022 Russian Invasion of Ukraine, Russian forces captured Promin and surrounding areas. The village was administered by the Mykolaiv Military Civilian Administration until November 2022, when Promin was liberated as part of the Ukrainian southern counteroffensive.
