= Voskresenka, Polohy Raion, Zaporizhzhia Oblast =

Village in Zaporizhzhia Oblast, Ukraine

Voskresenka Воскресенка
- Village
- Location within Zaporizhzhia Oblast Location within Ukraine
- Coordinates: 47°27′58″N 36°22′15″E
- Country: Ukraine
- Oblast: Zaporizhzhia Oblast
- Raion: Polohy Raion
- Established: 1809

Area
  - Total: 11.97 km^{2} (4.62 sq mi)
- Elevation: 122 m (400 ft)

Population (2001)
  - Total: 3,648
  - Density: 304.8/km^{2} (789.3/sq mi)
- Time zone: UTC+2 (EET)
  - Summer (DST): UTC+3 (EEST)
- Postal code: 70642
- Area code: +380 6165

Voskresenka (Ukrainian: Воскресенка), known as Chapaievka (Ukrainian: Чапаєвка) before 2016, is a village in southern Ukraine, in Polohy Raion, Zaporizhzhia Oblast. Its population was 3,648 people in 2001.

It is the center of Voskresenka rural hromada, one of the hromadas of Ukraine.

== Demographics ==
As of the 2001 Ukrainian census, Voskresenka (formerly Chapaievka) had a population of 3,648 inhabitants. The linguistic distribution of the population was as follows:

Native languages in Voskresenka
	percent
Ukrainian	96.5%
Russian	3.3%
Bulgarian	0.1%
Armenian	0.1%
others	0.2%
