= Myroliubiv =

Rural locality in Zhytomyr Oblast, Ukraine

Myroliubiv Миролюбів
- Rural settlement
- Location within Zhytomyr Oblast Location within Ukraine
- Coordinates: 51.25°N 28.12°E
- Country: Ukraine
- Oblast: Zhytomyr Oblast
- Raion: Korosten Raion
- Time zone: UTC+2 (EET)
  - Summer (DST): UTC+3 (EEST)

Myroliubiv (Ukrainian: Миролюбів), until May 2016 Zhovtneve (Ukrainian: Жовтневе), is a rural settlement in Korosten Raion, Zhytomyr Oblast, Ukraine. Population: 576 (2022 estimate) In 2001, population was 671.

== History ==
On 21 May 2016, Verkhovna Rada adopted decision to rename Zhovtneve to Myroliubiv according to the law prohibiting names of Communist origin.

Until 26 January 2024, Myroliubiv was designated urban-type settlement. On this day, a new law entered into force which abolished this status, and Myroliubiv became a rural settlement.
