= Zaberezh =

Zaberezh Забереж
- Village
- Interactive map of Zaberezh
- Location within Ukraine Location within Zakarpattia Oblast
- Coordinates: 48°13′4″N 23°32′40″E
- Country: Ukraine
- Oblast: Zakarpattia Oblast
- Raion: Khust Raion

Population (2001)
  - Total: 722

Zaberezh (Ukrainian: Забереж, until 2016 called Zhovtneve (Ukrainian: Жовтневе); Hungarian: Záberezs) is a village in the Khust Raion of Zakarpattia Oblast, Ukraine. As of 2001, its population was 722.

== History ==
In 1904, the village's name was changed to Dombtelep.
