= Haidamatske, Dnipropetrovsk Oblast =

Rural locality in Dnipropetrovsk Oblast, Ukraine

Haidamatske (Ukrainian: Гайдамацьке, formerly Chervonyi Yar) is a village in Dnipro Raion of Dnipropetrovsk Oblast, Ukraine, located at 48°13′51″N 34°35′37″E. It belongs to Solone settlement hromada, one of the hromadas of Ukraine.

Until 18 July 2020, Haidamatske belonged to Solone Raion. The raion was abolished in July 2020 as part of the administrative reform of Ukraine, which reduced the number of raions of Dnipropetrovsk Oblast to seven. The area of Solone Raion was merged into Dnipro Raion.
