= Bilokurakyne =

Urban locality in Luhansk Oblast, Ukraine

Bilokurakyne Білокуракине
- Rural settlement
- Location in Luhansk Oblast Location in Ukraine
- Coordinates: 49°31′38″N 38°46′15″E
- Country: Ukraine
- Oblast: Luhansk Oblast
- Raion: Svatove Raion
- Hromada: Bilokurakyne settlement hromada

Government
  - Mayor: Serhiy Siryk

Population (2022)
  - Total: 6,349
- Time zone: UTC+2 (EET)
  - Summer (DST): UTC+3 (EEST)

Bilokurakyne (Ukrainian: Білокуракине, Russian: Белокуракино) is a rural settlement in Svatove Raion in the Luhansk Oblast of Ukraine. Prior to 2020, it was the administrative center of the former Bilokurakyne Raion. It is located on the Bila River, a right tributary of the Aidar, in the basin of the Don. Population: 6,349 (2022 estimate).

== Economy ==
=== Transportation ===
Bilokurakyne is connected by road with Starobilsk where it has further access to Highway H26 ro Svatove and Bilovodsk, as well as to Highway H21 to Luhansk. However, the section between Shchastia and Luhansk is controlled by the Luhansk People's Republic, and free movement from Shchastia to Luhansk is impossible.

There is a railway line in Bilokurakyne, which is currently disconnected from the rest of the railway network in Ukraine. To the south, it extends to Starobilsk and Kondrashivska Nova, in Stanytsia Luhanska, and to the north it crosses the border to Russia, and further runs to Valuyki. Bilokurakyne railway station has infrequent passenger traffic between Kondrashivska Nova and Lantrativka.

== Demographics ==
As of the 2001 Ukrainian census, the town had a population of 7,969 inhabitants. The native language composition was as follows:

Native languages in Bilokurakyne
Languages	percent
Ukrainian	90.8%
Russian	9.0%
Belarusian	0.1%
Armenian	0.1%
others	0.1%

== Notable people ==
- Vitalii Kurylo (born 1957), Ukrainian politician
