= Armorial of the Luhansk People's Republic =

This article lists the coats of arms used in the Luhansk People's Republic, a disputed republic of Russia. The territory is internationally recognised de jure as the Ukrainian-administered Luhansk Oblast but is de facto under Russian control.

== Republican ==
=== Current ===
October 2014 – present

=== Historical coat of arms ===
Coat of Arms of Luhansk Oblast

April 2014 - May 2014

June 2014 - October 2014

== Urban districts ==
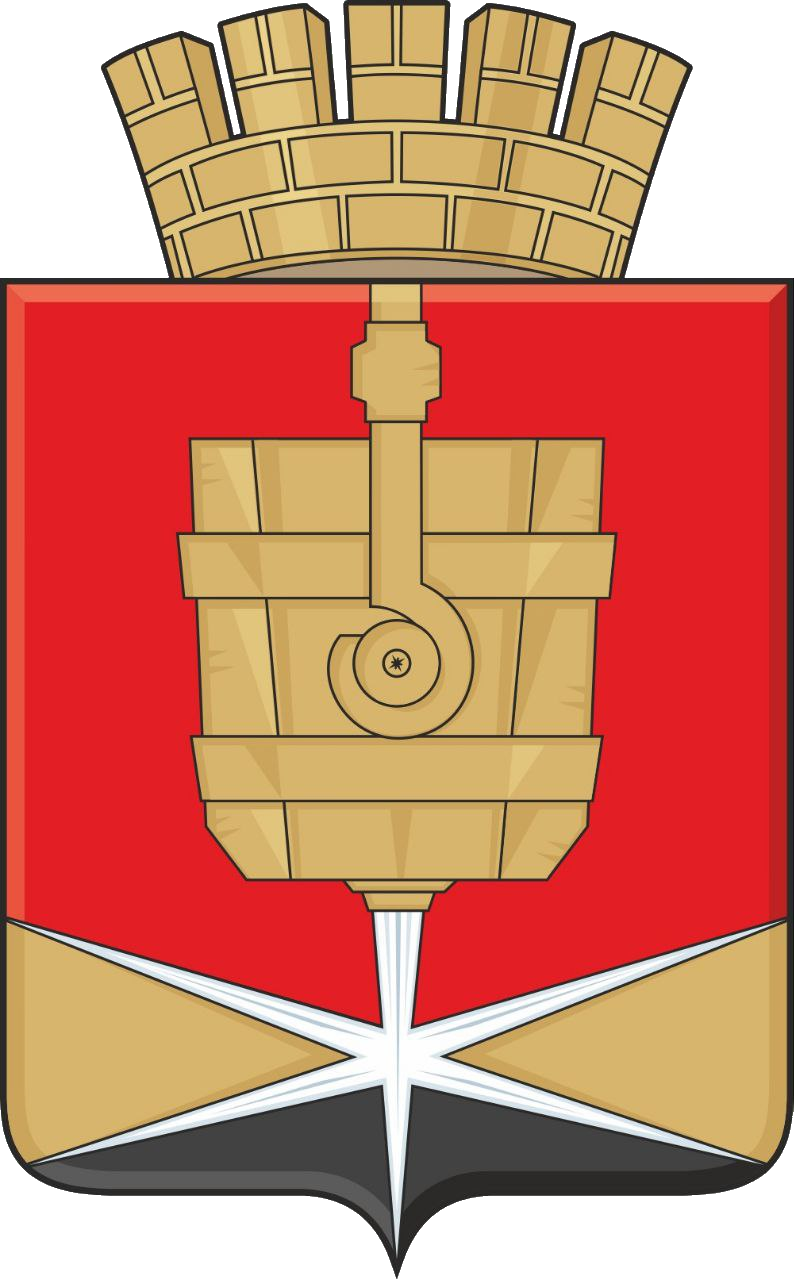
Alchevsk Urban District

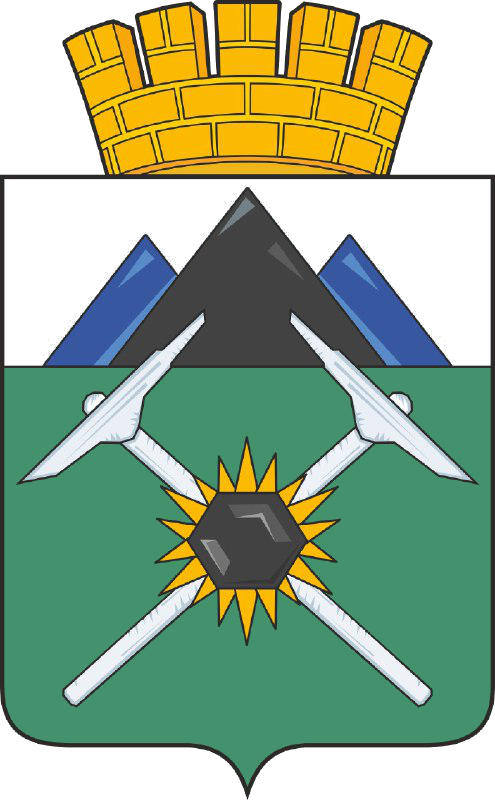
Bryanka Urban District

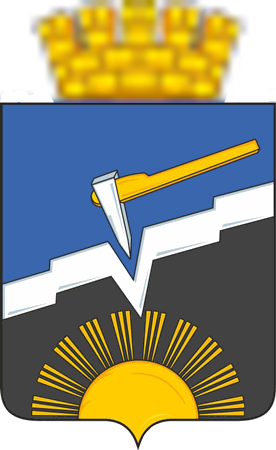
Kirovsk Urban District

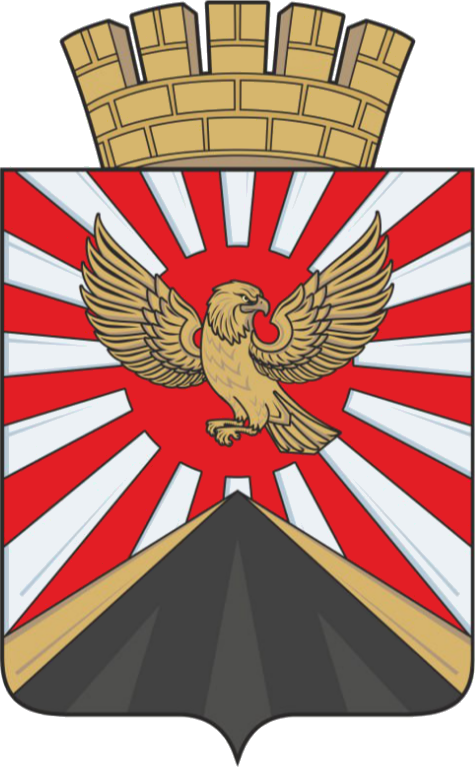
Krasny Luch Urban District

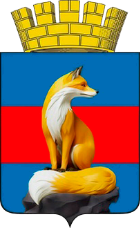
Lisichansk Urban District

Lugansk Urban District

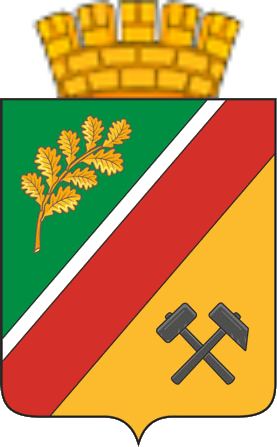
Pervomaysk Urban District

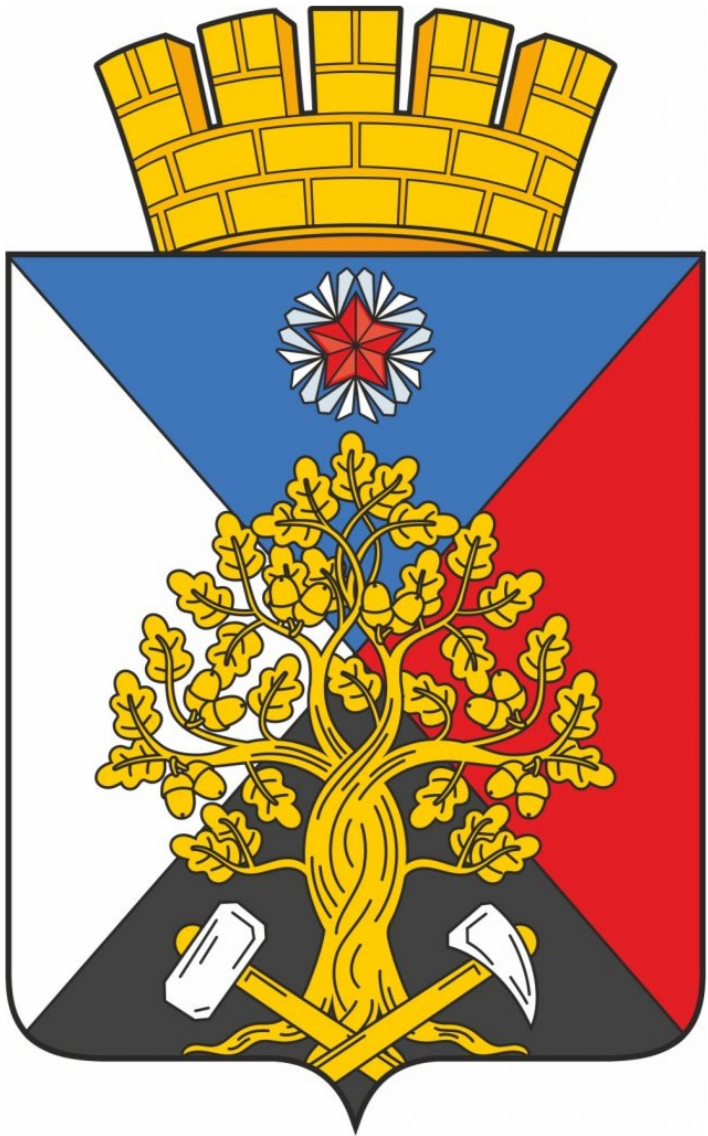
Rovenky Urban District

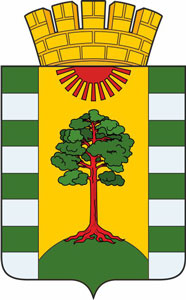
Rubezhnoye Urban District

Severodonetsk Urban District

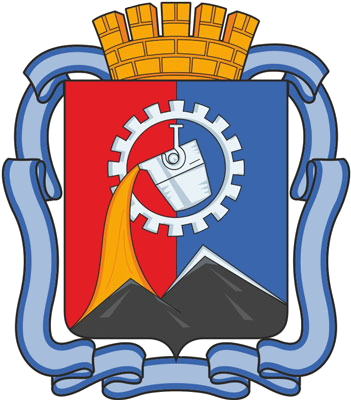
Stakhanov Urban District

== Municipal Districts ==
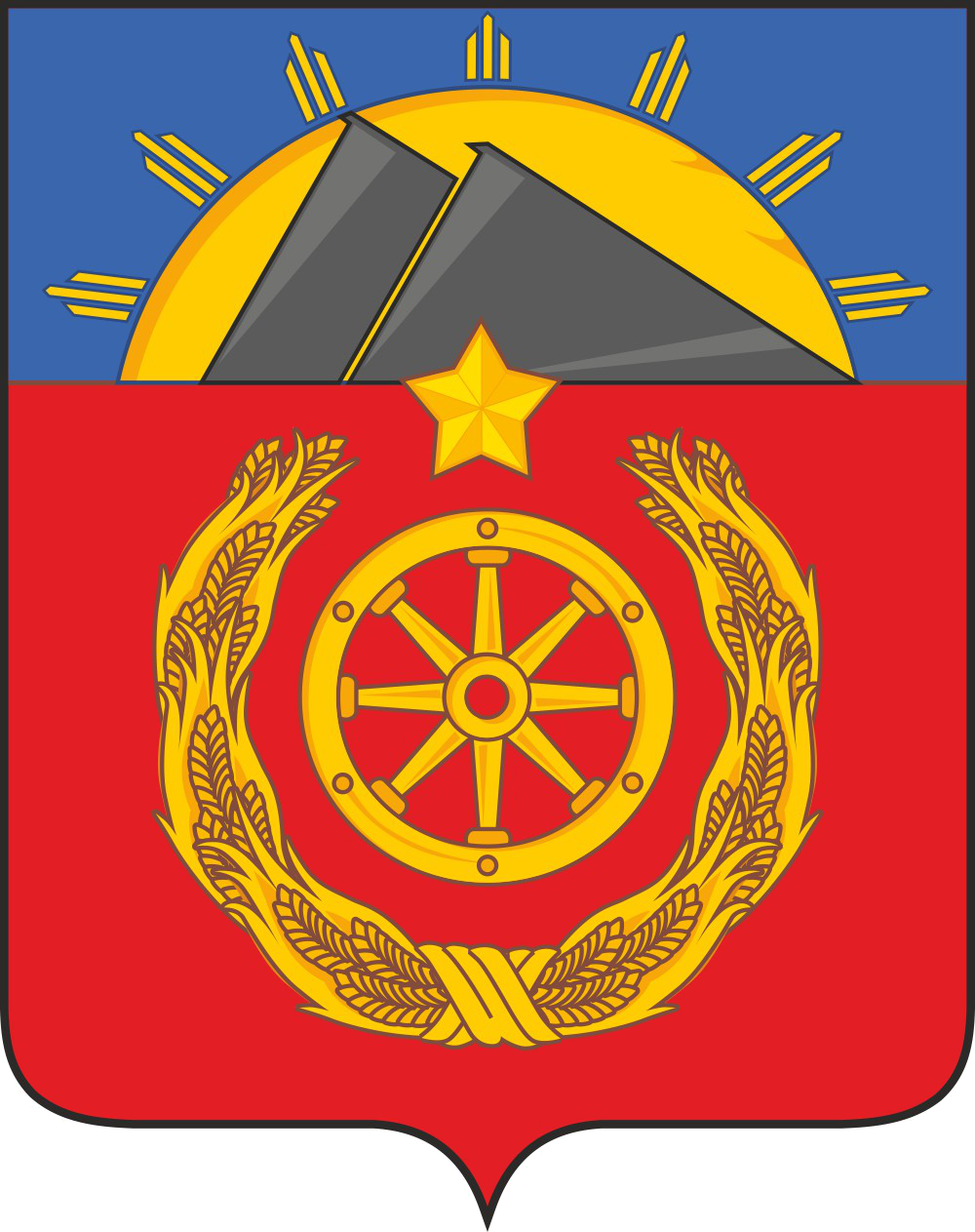
Antratsitovsky Municipal District

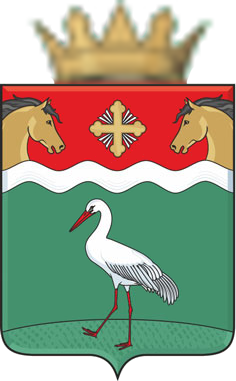
Belovodsky Municipal District

Belokurakinsky Municipal District

Krasnodon Municipal District

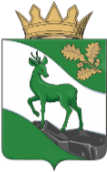
Kremensky Municipal District

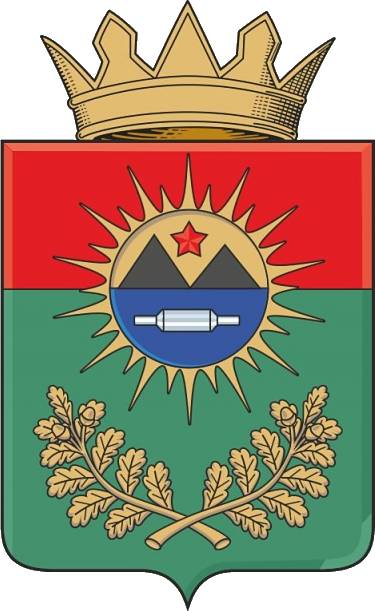
Lutuginsky Municipal District

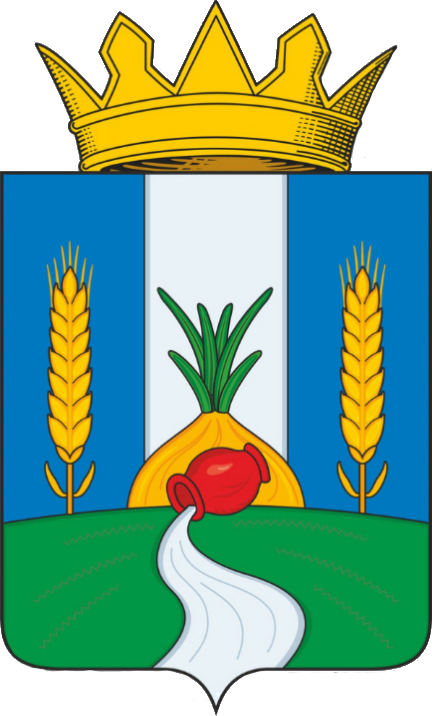
Markovsky Municipal District

Melovsky Municipal District

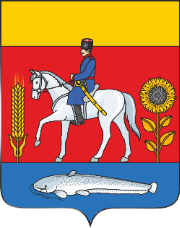
Novoaydarsky Municipal District

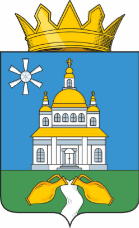
Novopskov Municipal District

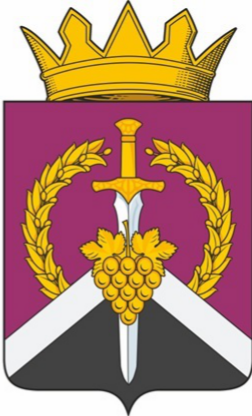
Perevalsk Municipal District

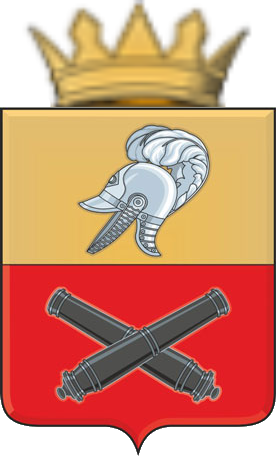
Slavyanoserbsk Municipal District

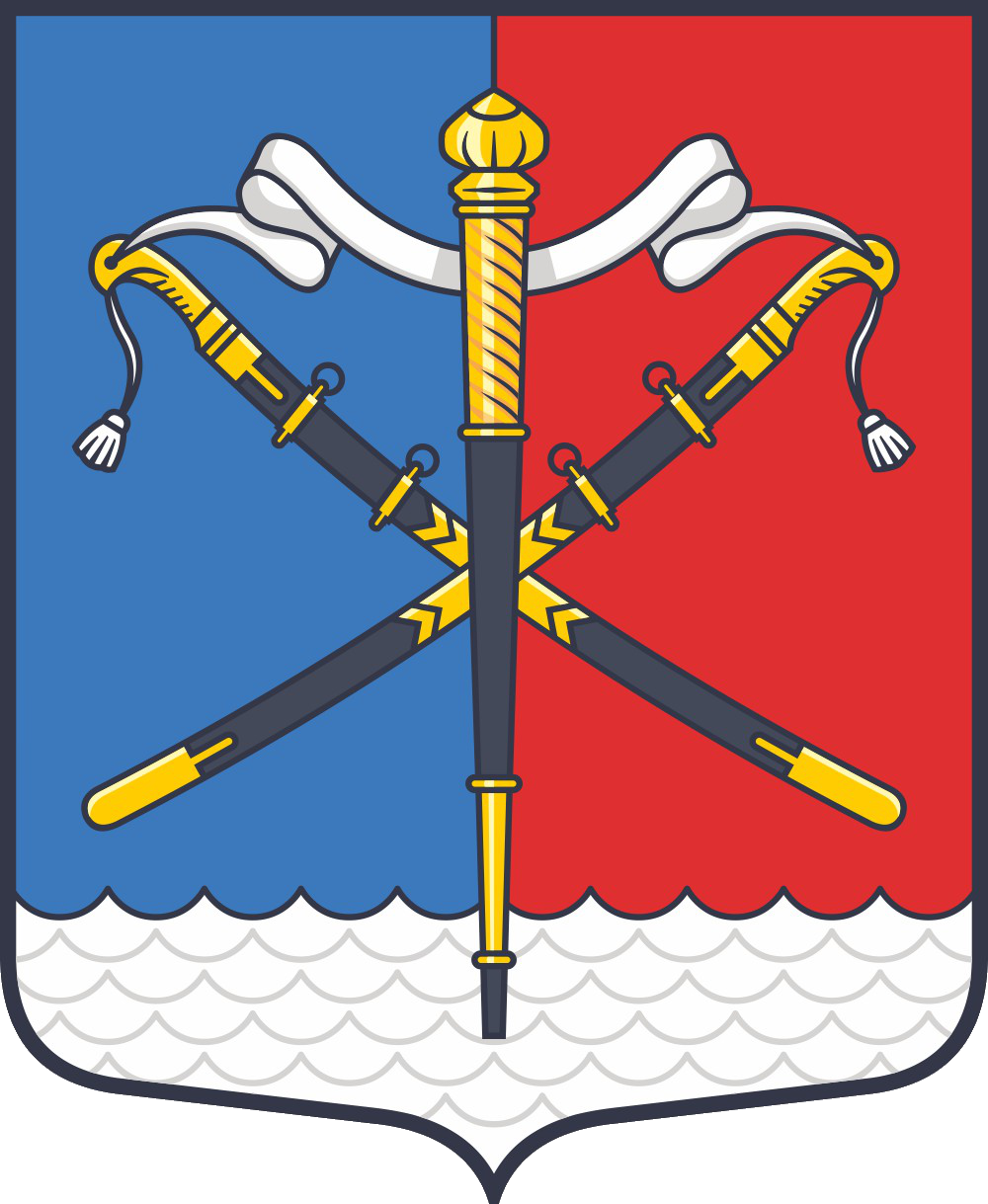
Stanichno-Lugansk Municipal District

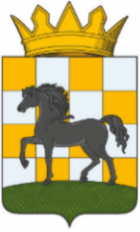
Starobelsk Municipal District

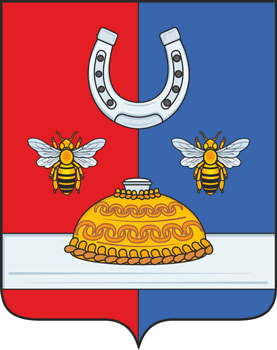
Svatovsky Municipal District

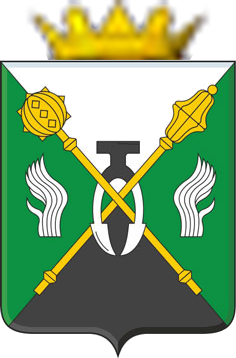
Sverdlovsk Municipal District

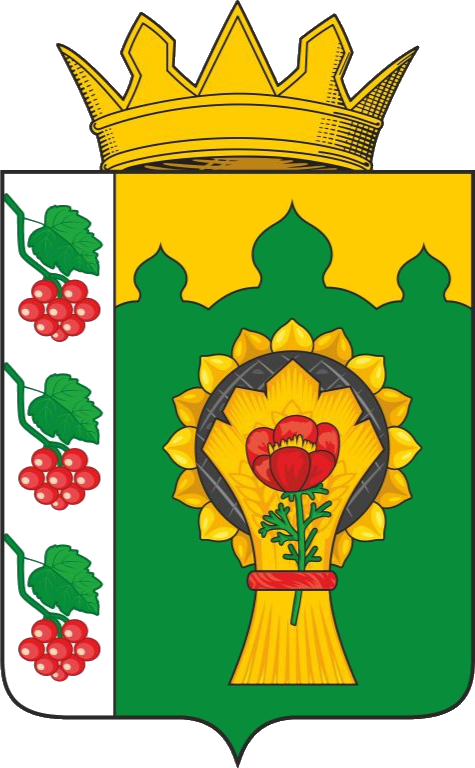
Troitsky Municipal District

== See also ==
- Armorial of Russia
- Armorial of Ukraine
