= Nyzhnia Duvanka settlement hromada =

Nyzhnia Duvanka settlement hromada Нижньодуванська селищна громада
- Hromada
- Interactive map of Nyzhnia Duvanka settlement hromada
- Country: Ukraine
- Oblast: Luhansk Oblast
- Raion: Svatove Raion

Area
  - Total: 561.4 km^{2} (216.8 sq mi)

Population (2020)
  - Total: 5,307
  - Density: 9.453/km^{2} (24.48/sq mi)
- Settlements: 17
- Rural settlements: 1
- Villages: 16

Nyzhnia Duvanka settlement hromada (Ukrainian: Нижньодуванська селищна громада) is a hromada of Ukraine, located in Svatove Raion, Luhansk Oblast. Its administrative center is the rural settlement of Nyzhnia Duvanka.

It has an area of 561.4 square kilometres (216.8 mi^{2}) and a population of 5,307, as of 2020.

== Composition ==
The hromada comprises seventeen settlements; one rural settlement, Nyzhnia Duvanka, and sixteen villages:

- Kulykivka
- Lebedivka
- Nauholne
- Novochervone
- Novonykanorivka
- Oborotnivka
- Oleksandrivka
- Poltava
- Preobrazhenne
- Pylypivka
- Sofiivka
- Tarasivka
- Tverdokhlibove
- Verkhnia Duvanka
- Vestativka
- Yablunivka

== See also ==
- List of hromadas of Ukraine
