= Syrotyne, Svatove Raion, Luhansk Oblast =

Village in Luhansk Oblast, Ukraine

Syrotyne Сиротине
- Village
- Location of Syrotyne within Luhansk Oblast#Location of Syrotyne within Ukraine Syrotyne (Ukraine)
- Coordinates: 50°03′22″N 38°15′43″E
- Country: Ukraine
- Oblast: Luhansk Oblast
- District: Svatove Raion
- Founded: 1778
- Elevation: 100 m (330 ft)

Population (2001)
  - Total: 568
- Time zone: UTC+2 (EET)
  - Summer (DST): UTC+3 (EEST)
- Postal code: 92111
- Area code: +380 6456

Syrotyne (Ukrainian: Сиротине) is a village in Svatove Raion (district) in Luhansk Oblast of eastern Ukraine.

Until 18 July 2020, Syrotyne was located in Troitske Raion. The municipality was abolished in July 2020 as part of the administrative reform of Ukraine and the number of raions of Luhansk Oblast was reduced to eight, of which only four were controlled by the government. Troitske Raion was merged into Svatove Raion.

== Demographics ==
According to the 2001 census, the vast majority of the population have Russian as their mother tongue (95.6%), followed by Ukrainian (4.23%).
