= Highway H26 (Ukraine) =

Road in Ukraine

Highway H26
- Автошлях Н26

Route information
- History: Redesignated as H26 in 2017

Major junctions
- west end: M 03 in Chuhuiv
- east end: Russian border in Milove

Location
- Country: Ukraine
- Oblasts: Kharkiv, Luhansk, Donbas

Highway system
- Roads in Ukraine; State Highways

H26, previously known as P07, is a national highway (H-highway) and former regional road (P-Highway) in the Kharkiv and Luhansk Oblasts of Donbas, Ukraine. It runs west–east and connects Chuhuiv near Kharkiv through Starobilsk with Milove on the border with Russia. On 9 August 2017, the P07 was redesignated as H26.

== War in Donbas ==
Significant armed conflict has occurred along and near the P07 during the Russo-Ukrainian War.

In Starobilsk, on July 12, 2014, Russian-backed separatists partially damaged a bridge over the Aidar River.

== Main route ==
Main route and connections to/intersections with other highways in Ukraine.

| Marker | Main settlements | Notes | Highway Interchanges |
|---|---|---|---|
| 0 km | Chuhuiv | | M 03 |
| | between Malynivka and Korobochkyne | | E40 |
| | Shevchenkove | | T2110 |
| | Kupiansk | | P79 |
| | near Dachne and Svatove | | T1303 |
| | Svatove | | T1307 |
| | Starobilsk | | T1302 T1313 • H 21 • T1302 • T1308 |
| | Bilovodsk | | T1314 |
| 289.7 km | Milove | border: Chertkovo, Rostovskaya, Russia | T1307 |

== Other stops ==
The H26 also passes either through or near Malynivka, Korobochkyne, Doslidne-Chkalovske, and Havrylivka in Chuhuiv Raion; Khudoyarove, Shevchenkove, Pervomaiske, Starovirivka, Hrushivka-Vasylivka-Osadkivka (Prokopivka station), Kupiansk, Petropavlivka, and Kyslivka in Kupiansk Raion; Berestova station, Novoselivske-Kuzemivka, Uchnivskyi station, Kryvoshyivka, Pidkuichansk, Kryvoshyivka station, Kalynivka station, Kolomyichykha, Zmiivka, Honcharivka station, Svatove, Petrivka, and Mistky, in Svativskyi; Dzhelmilne, Kalykivka, Levadne, Krynychky, Starobilsk, Vyshneve, Stepove, and Orikhove in Starobilsk Raion; Yevsuh, Pryvilne-Parneve, Bilovodsk, and Novospasivka in Bilovodskyi; Striltsivka, Novostriltsivka, Zarichne, Velykotska, Travneve, Chertkovo station (Rostovskaya), Ukraine-Russia border in Milove Raion.

== See also ==
- Roads in Ukraine
