= Lozno-Oleksandrivka settlement hromada =

Lozno-Oleksandrivka settlement hromada Лозно-Олександрівська селищна громада
- Hromada
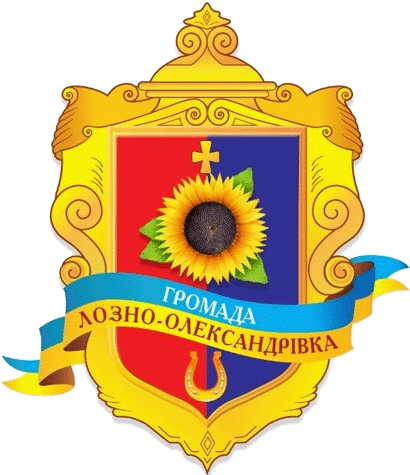
- Coat of arms
- Interactive map of Lozno-Oleksandrivka settlement hromada
- Country: Ukraine
- Oblast: Luhansk
- Raion: Svatove

Area
  - Total: 533.9 km^{2} (206.1 sq mi)

Population (2020)
  - Total: 4,405
  - Density: 8.251/km^{2} (21.37/sq mi)
- Settlements: 25
- Rural settlements: 2
- Villages: 22
- Towns: 1

Lozno-Oleksandrivka settlement hromada (Ukrainian: Лозно-Олександрівська селищна громада) is a hromada of Ukraine, located in Svatove Raion, Luhansk Oblast. Its administrative center is the town of Lozno-Oleksandrivka.

It has an area of 533.9 square kilometres (206.1 mi^{2}) and a population of 4,405, as of 2020.

The hromada contains 25 settlements: 1 town (Lozno-Oleksandrivka), 22 villages:

- Berezivka
- Vivcharivka
- Vilshany
- Hladkove
- Holovkove
- Duvanka
- Kalinova Balka
- Kochyne-Rozpasiivka
- Lozne
- Luhove
- Maslakove
- Mykolaivka
- Novopokrovka
- Nyanchyne
- Aleksapil
- Petrivka
- Popasne
- Solidarne
- Trudroditelske
- Chapliivka
- Sharivka
- Shakhove

And 2 rural-type settlements: Privillia and Myrne.

== See also ==
- List of hromadas of Ukraine
