= Krasna (river) =

River in eastern Ukraine

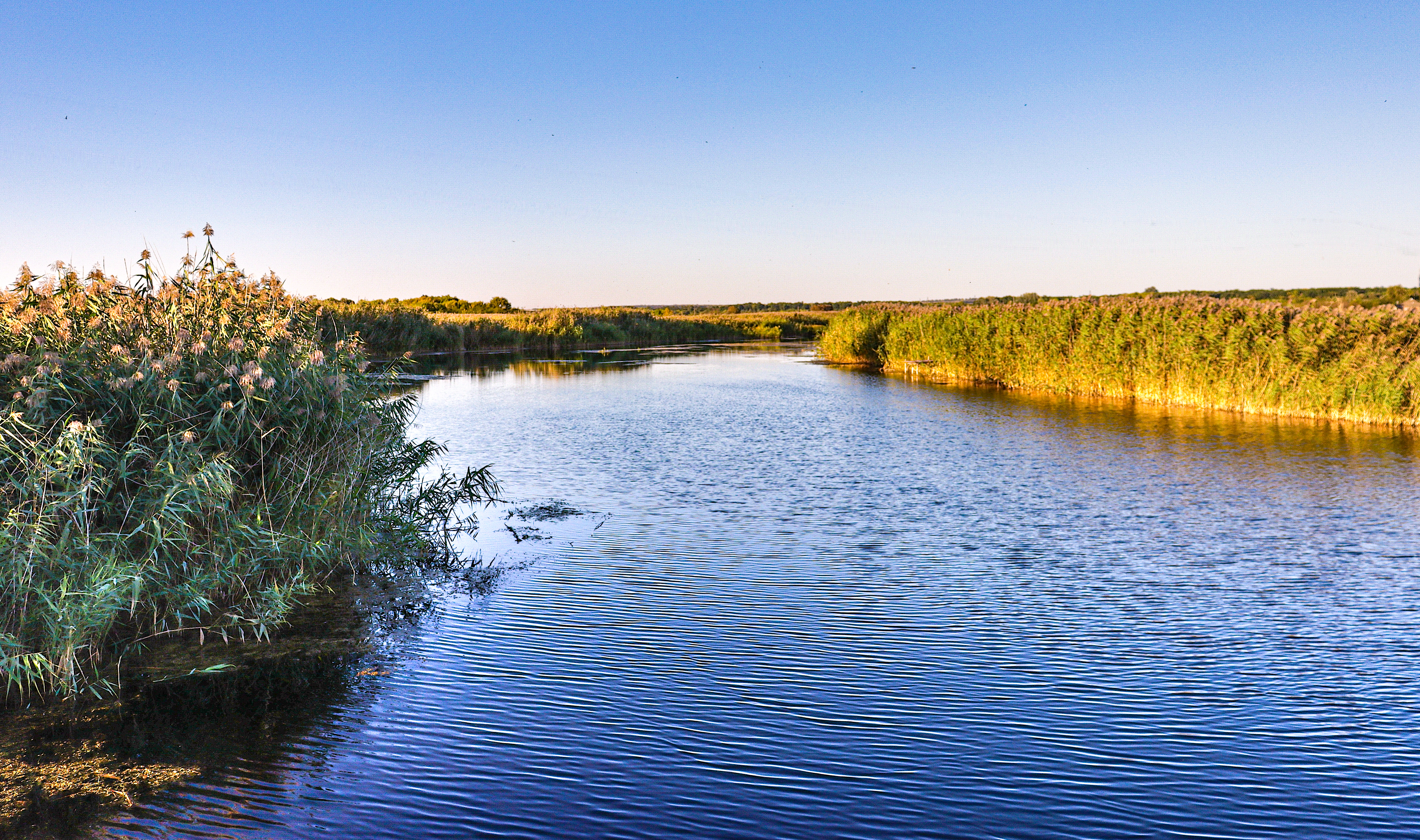

Location
- Country: Ukraine
- State: Luhansk Oblast
- District: Svatove Raion; Sievierodonetsk Raion

Physical characteristics
- Source: Tymonove
  - coordinates: 49.7605°N 38.4568°E
- Mouth: Kreminna
  - coordinates: 49.0239°N 38.2633°E
- Length: 151 km (94 mi)
- Basin size: 2710 km^{2}

The Krasna (Ukrainian: Красна) is a river in Ukraine, a tributary on the left bank of the Donets River, within the Don River Basin.

== Etymology ==
The name of the river means red in Ukrainian.

== History ==
During the Russian invasion of Ukraine, this river became part of the frontline in the Luhansk Oblast campaign, and there were many fortifications in the areas around the river.

== Geography ==
The Krasna flows through the Luhansk Oblast of Ukraine, and has a basin drainage of 2,710 km^{2}. The 151-km long river begins at the village of Tymonove, flows though Svatove, and ends at Kreminna, where it merges into the Donets.

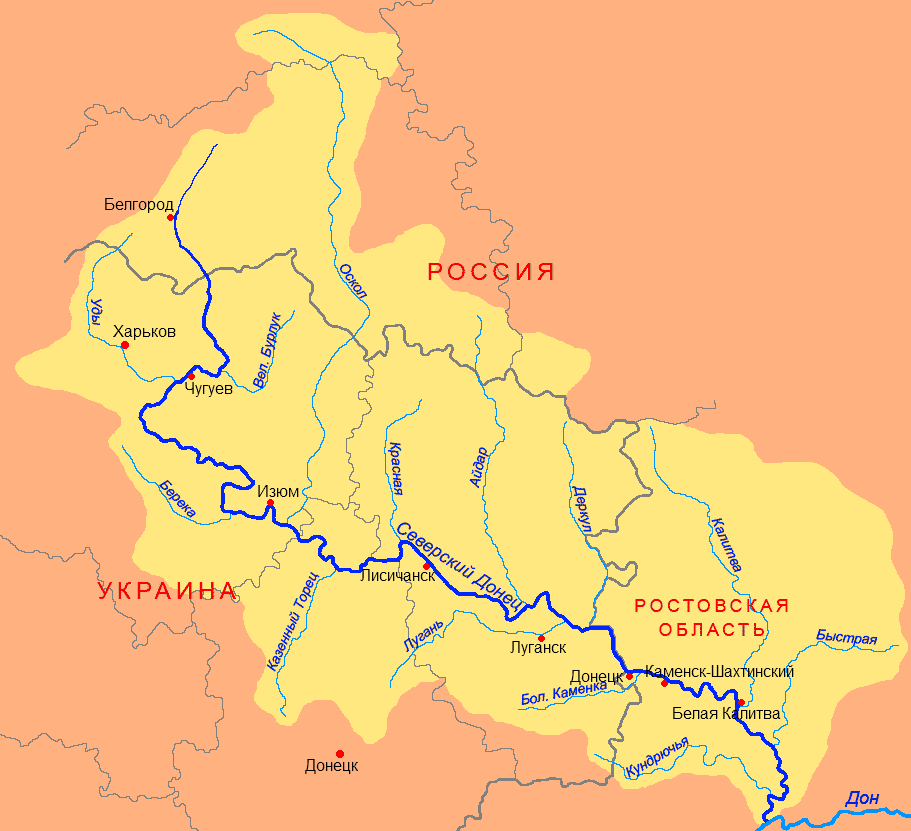
Map of the Donets drainage basin, which includes the Krasna River.

With a drop of 0.5 m per km, the river is gently flowing. The width of its valley is 3.5 km. The right bank is high, up to 60 m in places, and cut by short but deep ravines. The flat left bank is lower, less than 30 m high and gently cut by tributary streams.

== Nature ==
The river is protected within the Sieverski Donets National Park.
