= Troitske settlement hromada =

Troitske settlement hromada Троїцька селищна громада
- Hromada
- Interactive map of Troitske settlement hromada
- Country: Ukraine
- Oblast: Luhansk
- Raion: Svatove

Area
  - Total: 1,222.2 km^{2} (471.9 sq mi)

Population (2020)
  - Total: 15,948
  - Density: 13.049/km^{2} (33.796/sq mi)
- Settlements: 46
- Villages: 45
- Towns: 1

Troitske settlement hromada (Ukrainian: Троїцька селищна громада) is a hromada of Ukraine, located in Svatove Raion, Luhansk Oblast. Its administrative center is the town of Troitske.

It has an area of 1,222.2 square kilometres (471.9 mi^{2}) and a population of 15,948, as of 2020.

The hromada contains 46 settlements: 1 town (Troitske) and 45 villages:

- Anoshkine
- Arapivka
- Babicheve
- Bahachka
- Baranycheve
- Bohoroditske
- Vysoke
- Voivodske
- Hlotivka
- Davidivka
- Demino-Olexandrivka
- Dzherelne
- Zhovtneve
- Zahirya
- Zaitseve
- Illinka
- Karaichne
- Kashkarne
- Klynuvatka
- Kozaryk
- Kochenove
- Koshelyvka
- Krasnohrihorivka
- Lantrativka
- Maksimivka
- Maloleksandrivka
- Maslivka
- Mykhailivka
- Novoznamyanka
- Novooleksandrivka
- Ozero
- Pokrovske
- Poltavske
- Rodnychki
- Rozpasiivka
- Rozsypne
- Syrotine
- Solontsi
- Sudbynka
- Tymonove
- Topoli
- Fedosiivka
- Tsarivka
- Shatkivka
- Yami

== See also ==
- List of hromadas of Ukraine
