= Syrotyne =

Syrotyne (Ukrainian: Сиротине) may refer to several places in Ukraine

- Syrotyne, Sievierodonetsk Raion, Luhansk Oblast, village in Sievierodonetsk Raion
- Syrotyne, Svatove Raion, Luhansk Oblast, village in Svatove Raion
- Syrotyne (border checkpoint), border checkpoint in the above village
- Syrotyne, Sumy Oblast, village in Sumy Raion
