= Zmiivka, Luhansk Oblast =

Rural locality in Luhansk Oblast, Ukraine

Zmiivka Зміївка
- Village
- Location within Ukraine Location within Luhansk Oblast
- Coordinates: 49°27′01″N 38°03′41″E
- Country: Ukraine
- Oblast: Luhansk Oblast
- Raion: Svatove Raion
- Hromada: Svatove urban hromada
- Elevation: 137 m (449 ft)
- Population (2001): 80

Zmiivka (Ukrainian: Зміївка, pronounced [z⁽ʲ⁾miˈjiu̯kɐ]; Russian: Змиевка, romanized: Zmiyevka) is a village in Svatove urban hromada, Svatove Raion, Luhansk Oblast, Ukraine.
