= Highway H21 (Ukraine) =

Highway in Ukraine

Highway H21
- Автошлях Н21
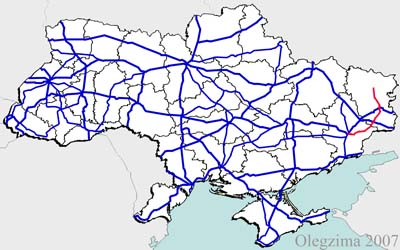

Route information
- Length: 206.8 km (128.5 mi)

Major junctions
- West end: H 20 in Donetsk
- East end: P 07 in Starobilsk

Location
- Country: Ukraine
- Oblasts: Donbas, Donetsk, Luhansk

Highway system
- Roads in Ukraine; State Highways
← H 20	→ H 22

H21 is an important Ukraine national highway (H-highway) in the Donetsk Oblast and Luhansk Oblast of Donbas, Ukraine. It connects Donetsk through Luhansk with Starobilsk. The highway runs both, west–east between Donetsk and Luhansk, and south–north between Luhansk and Starobilsk. It passes either through or near Makiivka, Kolosnykove, Khartsyzk, Zuhres; Serdyte, Molodetske, and Shakhtarsk in Shakhtarsky; Torez, Snizhne, Miusynsk, Krasnyi Luch; Ivanivka and Malomykolaivka in Antratsitivsky; Myrne, Uspenka, Lutuhyne, and Heorhiivka in Lutuhynsky; Luhansk; Metalisk, Stukalova Balka, and Lyman-Tsvitni Pisky-Svitle in Slovianoserbsky; Shchastia; Mykhailivka in Troitsky; Novoaidar, Denezhnykove, and Peremorzhne-Shtormove in Novoaidarsky; Shul'hynka in Markivsky, Baidivke, and Polovynkyne in Starobilsky.

== War in Donbas ==
Significant armed conflict has occurred along and near the H21 during the Russo-Ukrainian War.

== Main route ==
Main route and connections to/intersections with other highways in Ukraine.

Marker	Main settlements	Notes	Highway Interchanges
0 km	Donetsk		H 20
	Khartsyzk		T0507
	Shakhtarsk and near Torez		T0517
	Krasnyi Luch		M 03
	Ivanivka, Rovenky Raion		T1319
	Uspenka		T1321
	Lutuhyne		T1310
	Heorhiivka, Luhansk Raion		T1320 • T1301
	Luhansk	Concurrent with M 04 until the second intersection with E40	E40 • M 04 • T1303
	Shchastia		T1309
	near Raihorodka in Novoaidar Raion		T1315
	Novoaidar		T1306
206.8 km	Starobilsk		P07

== See also ==
- Highway of Death (Ukraine)
- Roads in Ukraine
- Ukraine Highways
