= Helmut Rüffler =

German fighter ace and Knight's Cross recipient (1918–2001)

- Born: 18 January 1918; Waldenburg, German Empire
- Died: 21 September 2001 (aged 83); Lohmar-Heide, Germany
- Military career
- Allegiance: Nazi Germany; West Germany
- Branch: Luftwaffe (Wehrmacht); German Air Force (Bundeswehr)
- Service years: 1940–1945
- Rank: Oberfeldwebel (master sergeant in the Wehrmacht); Oberstabsfeldwebel (sergeant major in the Bundeswehr)
- Units: JG 3, JG 51
- Conflicts: World War II: Operation Barbarossa; Defense of the Reich
- Awards: Knight's Cross of the Iron Cross

Helmut Rüffler (18 January 1918 – 21 September 2001) was a German Luftwaffe ace and recipient of the Knight's Cross of the Iron Cross during World War II. The Knight's Cross of the Iron Cross, and its variants were the highest awards in the military and paramilitary forces of Nazi Germany during World War II. Rüffler was credited with 88 victories in 690 missions, a further 10 victories were claimed but not confirmed.

== Career ==
Rüffler was born on 18 January 1918 in Waldenburg, present-day Wałbrzych in Poland, at the time in the Province of Lower Silesia within the German Empire. Following flight training, (Note: Flight training in the Luftwaffe progressed through the levels A1, A2 and B1, B2, referred to as A/B flight training. A training included theoretical and practical training in aerobatics, navigation, long-distance flights and dead-stick landings. The B courses included high-altitude flights, instrument flights, night landings and training to handle the aircraft in difficult situations.) he was posted to the Ergänzungsgruppe of Jagdgeschwader 3 Udet (JG 3—3rd Fighter Wing) on 28 September 1940. Holding the rank of Unteroffizier, Rüffler was transferred to 7. Staffel (7th squadron) of JG 3 on 1 February 1941.

=== Operation Barbarossa ===
The Gruppe relocated to an airfield at Moderówka on 18 June where the Gruppe concluded their last preparations for Operation Barbarossa, the German invasion of the Soviet Union. At the start of the campaign, JG 3 was subordinated to the V. Fliegerkorps (5th Air Corps), under command of General der Flieger Robert Ritter von Greim, which was part of Luftflotte 4 (4th Air Fleet), under command of Generaloberst Alexander Löhr. These air elements supported Generalfeldmarschall Gerd von Rundstedt's Heeresgruppe Süd (Army Group South), with the objective of capturing Ukraine and its capital Kiev.

=== Defense of the Reich ===
Combat box of a 12-plane B-17 squadron. Three such boxes completed a 36-plane group box.: 1. Lead Element; 2. High Element; 3. Low Element; 4. Low Low Element

In early August 1943, II. Gruppe of JG 3 was withdrawn from the Eastern Front for service in Defense of the Reich on the Western Front. The Gruppe spent one-month training in northern Germany before they arrived at the Schiphol airfield near Amsterdam in the Netherlands on 12 September. While based at Uetersen Airfield, Rüffler joined the Gruppe which received the Messerschmitt Bf 109 G-6 and was equipped with Y-Control for fighters, a system used to control groups of fighters intercepting United States Army Air Forces (USAAF) bomber formations. Rüffler was assigned to 4. Staffel commanded by Oberleutnant Werner Lucas while the Gruppe was headed by Major Kurt Brändle. On 20 October, the USAAF targeted Düren. II. Gruppe intercepted the bombers near Venlo but were fended off by the escorting Republic P-47 Thunderbolt fighters. Elements of II. Gruppe managed to reach the bombers on their return. Two Boeing B-17 Flying Fortress bombers were shot down, including one by Rüffler. On 11 December, the USAAF VIII Bomber Command launched an attack on Emden. Defending against this attack, Rüffler was credited with an Herausschuss (separation shot) over a B-17 bomber—a severely damaged heavy bomber forced to separate from its combat box which was counted as an aerial victory.

On 24 February 1944, the USAAF Eighth and Fifteenth Air Force attacked German aircraft manufacturing during Operation Argument, also known as "Big Week". II. Gruppe intercepted west of Gotha, making several passes through the combat box formations. During this encounter, II. Gruppe pilots claimed seven bombers shot and two Herausschüsse, including one Consolidated B-24 Liberator bomber shot down by Rüffler. On 8 April, the USAAF committed 664 bombers in an attack on Luftwaffe airfields in northwest Germany and aircraft manufacturing near Braunschweig. That day, Rüffler claimed one of the attacking B-24 bombers shot down. On 18 April, the Eighth Air Force targeted the industrial area of Berlin. II. Gruppe was scrambled at 13:17 and without sustaining any losses claimed three B-17 bombers shot down, including one by Rüffler. The next day, Rüffler was credited with two aerial victories, a B-17 shot down and an Herausschuss over a second B-17. That day, the USAAF again targeted the German aircraft industry as well as Luftwaffe airfields in Westphalia and Hesse. On 8 May, the Eighth Air Force again headed for Berlin and Braunschweig. II. Gruppe was scrambled at 08:42 and were vectored to Hamburg and then southwest towards Bremen were Rüffler claimed an Herausschuss over a B-17 bomber.

On 18 July 1944, Rüffler engaged in aerial combat with North American P-51 Mustang fighters west of Caen. During this engagement, he claimed two P-51 fighters shot down before he was himself shot down and wounded in his Bf 109 G-6 (Werknummer 165 451—factory number). His injuries were so severe that he was out of action for several months. Following his convalescence, Rüffler did not return to JG 3 but was trained to fly the Messerschmitt Me 262 jet fighter in February 1945 but did not claim any aerial victories flying the Me 262. He then transferred to Jagdgeschwader 51 "Mölders" (JG 51—51st Fighter Wing) where he served as Schwarmführer of 9. Staffel of JG 51. Flying with JG 51 during the final days of the war, Rüffler claimed 25 further aerial victories on the Eastern Front.

== Later life ==
Following World War II, Rüffler joined the German Air Force, at the time referred to as the Bundesluftwaffe of the Bundeswehr. In 1963/64, he flew Sikorsky H-34 helicopters for German VIPs, such us Helmut Schmidt and Kai-Uwe von Hassel. His final rank was Oberstabsfeldwebel (sergeant major), a rank he received thanks to Eduard Adorno. Rüffler died on 21 September 2001 in Lohmar-Heide.

== Summary of career ==
=== Aerial victory claims ===
According to US historian David T. Zabecki, Rüffler was credited with 88 aerial victories, while Spick lists him with 98 aerial victories. Forsyth states that he shot eight four-engined heavy bombers. Mathews and Foreman, authors of Luftwaffe Aces — Biographies and Victory Claims, researched the German Federal Archives and state that he claimed at least 54 aerial victories, with over 50 claims on the Eastern Front and four claims over the Western Allies, including one four-engined bomber.

Victory claims were logged to a map-reference (PQ = Planquadrat), for example "PQ 15 S/NA-7". The Luftwaffe grid map (Jägermeldenetz) covered all of Europe, western Russia and North Africa and was composed of rectangles measuring 15 minutes of latitude by 30 minutes of longitude, an area of about 360 square miles (930 km^{2}). These sectors were then subdivided into 36 smaller units to give a location area 3 km × 4 km (1.9 mi × 2.5 mi) in size.

Chronicle of aerial victories
This and the ♠ (Ace of spades) indicates those aerial victories which made Rüffler an "ace-in-a-day", a term which designates a fighter pilot who has shot down five or more airplanes in a single day. This and the – (dash) indicates unconfirmed aerial victory claims for which Rüffler did not receive credit. This along with the * (asterisk) indicates an Herausschuss (separation shot)—a severely damaged heavy bomber forced to separate from his combat box which was counted as an aerial victory. This and the ? (question mark) indicates information discrepancies listed by Prien, Stemmer, Rodeike, Bock, Mathews and Foreman.
– 7. Staffel of Jagdgeschwader 3 – Operation Barbarossa — 22 June – 6 November 1941
1	22 June 1941	08:10	I-15		6	4 October 1941	16:40	SB-3	10 km (6.2 mi) southeast of Dmitrovsk
2	23 July 1941	13:42	DB-3	5 km (3.1 mi) northeast of Bila Tserkva	7	5 October 1941	15:40	Pe-2	80 km (50 mi) southeast of Oryol
3	25 July 1941	18:55	SB-3	15 km (9.3 mi) southeast of Bila Tserkva	8	14 October 1941	07:05	SB-3	10 km (6.2 mi) northeast of Oryol
4	10 August 1941	10:47	DB-3	15 km (9.3 mi) east of Kiev	9	29 October 1941	12:00	R-10 (Seversky)	20 km (12 mi) southeast of Tula
5	23 September 1941	10:50	Il-2	55 km (34 mi) northeast of Poltava					
– 7. Staffel of Jagdgeschwader 3 "Udet" – Eastern Front — 10 February – 14 April 1942
10	4 March 1942	09:06	U-2	15 km (9.3 mi) southeast of Staraya Russa	14	28 March 1942	13:53	I-301 (LaGG-3)	18 km (11 mi) northeast of Staraya Russa
11	9 March 1942	10:55	Pe-2	50 km (31 mi) southwest of Demyansk	15	28 March 1942	13:55	I-16? (Note: According to Mathews and Foreman claimed as Mikoyan-Gurevich MiG-3.)	10 km (6.2 mi) northeast of Staraya Russa
12	17 March 1942	09:18	I-61 (MiG-3)	6 km (3.7 mi) east of Sutschowka	16	29 March 1942	07:53	U-2	12 km (7.5 mi) northeast of Demyansk
13	28 March 1942	13:50	I-301 (LaGG-3)	15 km (9.3 mi) northeast of Staraya Russa	17	30 March 1942	15:30? (Note: According to Mathews and Foreman claimed at 15:36.)	I-61 (MiG-3)	10 km (6.2 mi) east of Staraya Russa
– 7. Staffel of Jagdgeschwader 3 "Udet" – Eastern Front — July 1942
18	25 July 1942	07:30	MiG-3	northeast of Kalach					
– 1. Staffel of Jagdgeschwader 3 "Udet" – Eastern Front — August – December 1942
19	5 August 1942	15:15	LaGG-3	5 km (3.1 mi) south of Nowo Grigorewskaja	36	17 October 1942	06:02	Il-2	10 km (6.2 mi) east of Stalingrad
20	23 August 1942	08:55	LaGG-3	20 km (12 mi) east of Katschalinsskaja	37	17 October 1942	06:04? (Note: According to Mathews and Foreman, claimed at 14:02.)	LaGG-3	6 km (3.7 mi) northeast of Stalingrad
21	27 August 1942	16:20	LaGG-3	3 km (1.9 mi) northeast of Stalingrad	38	17 October 1942	06:05	Il-2	5 km (3.1 mi) northeast of Stalingrad
22	28 August 1942	07:26	R-5	4 km (2.5 mi) northeast of Stalingrad	39	24 October 1942	13:45	LaGG-3	35 km (22 mi) north of Stalingrad
23	27 September 1942	08:50	MiG-1	15 km (9.3 mi) north of Srednyaya Akhtuba	40	24 October 1942	13:55	Il-2	30 km (19 mi) north of Leninsk
24	27 September 1942	09:15	LaGG-3	10 km (6.2 mi) east of Dubovka	41♠	28 October 1942	09:44	Il-2	3 km (1.9 mi) east of Kotluban train station 10 km (6.2 mi) north of Gumrak
25	28 September 1942	08:50	Yak-1	15 km (9.3 mi) northwest of Dubovka	42♠	28 October 1942	09:47	Il-2	2 km (1.2 mi) northeast of Kotluban train station 5 km (3.1 mi) north of Grebenka
26	28 September 1942	09:05	Yak-1	25 km (16 mi) northwest of Dubovka west of Rulew	43♠	28 October 1942	09:49	Il-2	35 km (22 mi) west of Dubovka
27	28 September 1942	15:15	Il-2	12 km (7.5 mi) northeast of Akhtuba	44♠	28 October 1942	09:50	LaGG-3	2 km (1.2 mi) southeast of Losnoje
28	30 September 1942	05:35	LaGG-3	3 km (1.9 mi) north of Losnoje	45♠	28 October 1942	15:10	LaGG-3	2 km (1.2 mi) east of Nowo Nikolskoje
29	1 October 1942	06:45	Yak-4	50 km (31 mi) northeast of Nowo Nikolskoje	46	31 October 1942	13:50	Il-2	4 km (2.5 mi) southeast of Stalingrad
30	2 October 1942	12:20	Il-2	18 km (11 mi) northeast of Kotluban train station	47	1 November 1942	15:00	LaGG-3	15 km (9.3 mi) east of Wladimirowka
31	2 October 1942	12:25	Il-2	22 km (14 mi) northeast of Kotluban train station	48	1 November 1942	15:12	LaGG-3	20 km (12 mi) southeast of Kapustin-Jar
32	2 October 1942	15:40	Yak-1	2 km (1.2 mi) north of Kotluban train station 10 km (6.2 mi) north of Gumrak	49	16 November 1942	10:30	LaGG-3	3 km (1.9 mi) east of Grasnoje
33	6 October 1942	11:20	Pe-2	5 km (3.1 mi) north of Konylenskij; 15 km (9.3 mi) southwest of Obliwskaja	50	16 November 1942	10:32	LaGG-3	3 km (1.9 mi) east of Grasnoje
34	8 October 1942	08:20	LaGG-3	2 km (1.2 mi) south of Iwanowka	— (Note: This unconfirmed claim is not listed by Prien, Stemmer, Rodeike, Bock. The authors do list a claim at that time, however that claim is attributed to Leutnant Friedrich Lorentzen.)	24 November 1942	12:05	unknown	
35	10 October 1942	07:45	Su-2 (Seversky)	15 km (9.3 mi) northeast of Stalingrad					
– 4. Staffel of Jagdgeschwader 3 "Udet" – Defense of the Reich — 12 September 1943 – 6 June 1944
51? (Note: According to Mathews and Foreman, this claim was unconfirmed.)	20 October 1943	14:45	B-17		55?	18 April 1944	—	B-17	
52?	11 December 1943	—	B-17*		56?	19 April 1944	—	B-17	
53	24 February 1944	13:42	B-24	PQ 15 S/NA-7 southwest of Ansbach	57?	19 April 1944	—	B-17*	
54?	8 April 1944	—	B-24		58?	8 May 1944	—	B-17*	
– 4. Staffel of Jagdgeschwader 3 "Udet" – Invasion of Normandy — 7 June – 22 August 1944
59	30 June 1944	20:50	P-51	PQ 05 Ost TA vicinity of Pont-l'Évêque	61	18 July 1944	09:21	P-51	PQ 04 Ost N/AA vicinity of Vimoutiers
60	16 July 1944	20:17	Spitfire	PQ 14 West AT-3/5 vicinity of Vire	62?	18 July 1944	09:21	P-51	PQ 04 Ost N/AA vicinity of Vimoutiers

=== Awards ===
- Front Flying Clasp of the Luftwaffe
- Wound Badge (1939)
  - in Black
- Iron Cross (1939) 2nd and 1st Class
- Honor Goblet of the Luftwaffe on 19 October 1942 as Feldwebel and pilot (Note: According to Obermaier on 15 June 1942.)
- German Cross in Gold on 3 December 1942 as Feldwebel in the I./Jagdgeschwader 3
- Knight's Cross of the Iron Cross on 23 December 1942 as Oberfeldwebel and pilot in the 4./Jagdgeschwader 3 "Udet" (Note: According to Scherzer as pilot in the I./Jagdgeschwader 3 "Udet".)
