= Tymonove =

Tymonove Тимонове
- Village
- Location within Luhansk Oblast Location within Ukraine
- Coordinates: 49°44′42″N 38°27′03″E
- Country: Ukraine
- Oblast: Luhansk Oblast
- Raion: Svatove Raion
- Hromada: Troitske Hromada
- Year founded: 1802

Population
  - Total: 696
- Time zone: UTC+2 (EET)
  - Summer (DST): UTC+3 (EEST)
- Postal Code: 92142
- KOATUU: 4425487001
- Area Code: +380 6456

Tymonove (Ukrainian: Тимонове) is a village in eastern Ukraine, within Svatove Raion of Luhansk Oblast. It has a population of 696.

== Demographics ==
In the 2001 Ukrainian Census, native languages of the local population were distributed as follows:

Russian – 84.91%

Ukrainian – 14.94%

Others – 0.15%

== Geography ==
The village is approximately the source of the Krasna River.

== History ==
This village suffered through the Holodomor from 1932 to 1933, with at least 60 confirmed residents to have died from starvation.

During the German-Soviet War, Nazi German troops occupied this village from 1941 to 1943.

During the Russo-Ukrainian War, Russian Troops occupied this village in 2022, and as of November 2022 remains under occupation.
