= Bilokurakyne settlement hromada =

Bilokurakyne settlement hromada Білокуракинська селищна громада
- Hromada
- Interactive map of Bilokurakyne settlement hromada
- Country: Ukraine
- Oblast: Luhansk
- Raion: Svatove

Area
  - Total: 1,124.3 km^{2} (434.1 sq mi)

Population (2020)
  - Total: 15,005
  - Density: 13.346/km^{2} (34.566/sq mi)
- Settlements: 38
- Villages: 37
- Towns: 1

Bilokurakyne settlement hromada (Ukrainian: Білокуракинська селищна громада) is a hromada of Ukraine, located in Svatove Raion, Luhansk Oblast. Its administrative center is the town of Bilokurakyne.

It has an area of 1,124.3 square kilometres (434.1 mi^{2}) and a population of 15,005, as of 2020.

The hromada contains 38 settlements: 1 town (Bilokurakyne) and 37 villages:

- Bunchukivka
- Hrytsaivka
- Demyanivka
- Zavodyanka
- Zaikivka
- Kalinivske
- Kartamysheve
- Klimivka
- Konoplyanivka
- Kuplyuvate
- Kuryachivka
- Lyzyne
- Lubyanka
- Lyashkivka
- Mankivka
- Nesheretove
- Novoandriivka
- Oleksandropil
- Oleksiivka
- Osykovo
- Pavlivka
- Pankivka
- Plaho-Petrivka
- Popivka
- Prykhodkivka
- Prostore
- Romanivka
- Rudove
- Svitlenka
- Stativchyne
- Timoshyne
- Khomenkove Druhe
- Khomenkove Pershe
- Tsiluikove
- Chabanov
- Shaparivka
- Shovkunivka

== See also ==
- List of hromadas of Ukraine
