= Nyzhnia Duvanka =

Urban locality in Luhansk Oblast, Ukraine

Nyzhnia Duvanka Нижня Дуванка
- Rural settlement
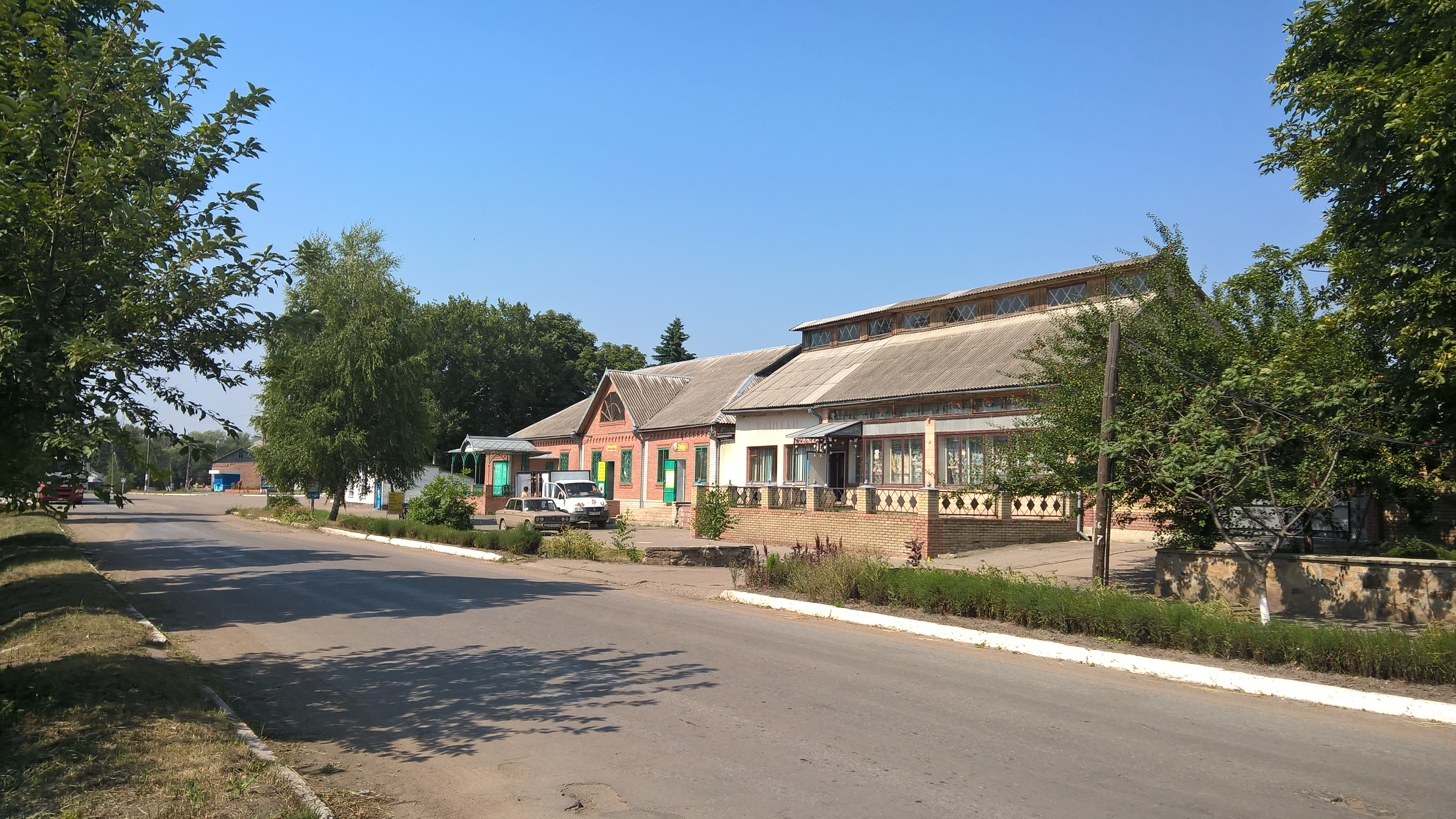
- Central street in Nyzhnia Duvanka
- Interactive map of Nyzhnia Duvanka
- Location of Nyzhnia Duvanka Nyzhnia Duvanka (Ukraine)
- Coordinates: 49°34′59″N 38°10′08″E
- Country: Ukraine
- Oblast: Luhansk Oblast
- Raion: Svatove
- Elevation: 78 m (256 ft)

Population (2022)
  - Total: 1,902
- Postal code: 92612
- Area code: +380 6471

Nyzhnia Duvanka (Ukrainian: Нижня Дуванка; Russian: Нижняя Дуванка, romanized: Nizhnyaya Duvanka) is a rural settlement in Sloboda Ukraine, in the Svatove Raion of the Luhansk Oblast of Ukraine. Population: 1,902 (2022 estimate)

== History ==
On 14 December 1960, Nizhnyaya Duvanka received the status of an urban-type settlement. In July 1995, the Cabinet of Ministers approved the decision to privatize the state farm.

== Demographics ==
According to the 2001 Ukrainian census, the settlement had a population of 2,429. The linguistic composition was:

Native languages in Nyzhnia Duvanka
	percent
Ukrainian	94.0%
Russian	5.6%
Belarusian	0.1%
others	0.3%

== Notable people ==
Dmytro Streknev, (1997-2019), Ukrainian soldier awarded with the Order for Courage
