= Troitske =

Urban locality in Luhansk Oblast, Ukraine

Troitske Троїцьке
- Rural settlement
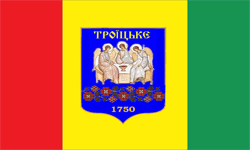
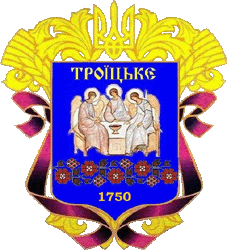
- Flag Seal
- Interactive map of Troitske
- Location of Troitske within Ukraine Troitske (Ukraine)
- Coordinates: 49°54′17″N 38°18′6″E
- Country: Ukraine
- Oblast: Luhansk Oblast
- Raion: Svatove Raion
- Hromada: Troitske settlement hromada

Area
  - Total: 127 km^{2} (49 sq mi)
- Elevation: 118 m (387 ft)

Population (2022)
  - Total: 7,144
  - Density: 56.3/km^{2} (146/sq mi)
- Postal code: 92102
- Area code: +380 6456

Troitske (Ukrainian: Троїцьке, Trojicʹke; Russian: Троицкое, Troickoje) is a rural settlement in Sloboda Ukraine, in the Svatove Raion of the Luhansk Oblast of Ukraine. Prior to 2020, it was the administrative centre of the former Troitske Raion. Population: 7,144 (2022 estimate).

== History ==
Troitske traces its heritage to a sloboda settlement Kalnivka (or Kalynivka) when five families headed by a centurial aged peasant Kalyna (nicknamed Kalnyi) resettled in these lands out of Urazova sloboda, Valuiky county in Voronezh Governorate sometime in the 1740s and 1750s. Near Kalynivka 2 versts towards Urazova River settled some Gypsy (Tsyhan) who traded horses and was looking for unoccupied pasture lands. Where he settled, there appeared a khutir (hamlet) Tsyhanivskyi or Tsyhanivka.

Those lands where peasants settled and as they found out belonged to M.Golitsyn. Those peasants were placed in serfdom.

In 1803 the Ober Procurator of the Most Holy Synod Prince Aleksandr Golitsyn proposed to residents of Kalnivka redemption to freedom. But they were unable to make huge redeeming pay in one time. Then the prince took out a land contract through a state bank obligating his peasants for the next 40 years to make deposits to bank on the sum of money with a defined percent. Thus, residents of Kalnivka and neighboring settlements, former serfs of princes Golitsyns, officially became bank's peasants. They had to pay the bank 35 rubles a year from each soul of male gender. From these excessive payments after 10 years, the peasants have become absolutely impoverished turning into beggars.

In 1815 Kalnivka accounted for 400 souls of male gender and with neighboring khutirs including Tsyhanivka 1,500. Here was built the Saint Trinity Church. Since then and until 1870s Kalnivka was officially known as Novotroitska Sloboda. In 1831–1833 Novotroitska Sloboda suffered a big hardship, a severe drought. Bread burned out in the fields, famine took place, erupted epidemic of cholera. Almost three quarters of residents perished. Oppression had intensified due to for each soul has fallen the payment for the deceased. Because of that there grew arrears. Another drought hit the crops in 1846–1847. The peasants became so impoverished that had refused to pay their obrok to the bank and sent their delegates (khodaki) to Saint Petersburg with a petition to release them from payment. There it turned out that during 39 years they had already deposited the full amount. By order of the Chamber of State Property from 2 September 1848 the sloboda residents were classified as state peasants.

== Demographics ==
Population
1959	1970	1979	1989	2001	2013
5.348	7.112	7.492	8.326	8.488	7.503

=== Census data ===
As of the Ukrainian national census in 2001, Troitske had a population of 8,386 inhabitants. The native language composition was as follows:

First languages in Troitske
	percent
Ukrainian	72.4%
Russian	27.5%
Armenian	0.1%
others	0.0%

== Notable people ==
- Bohdan Yermakov (born 1985), Ukrainian poet
