= Svatove urban hromada =

Svatove urban hromada Сватівська міська громада
- Hromada
- Interactive map of Svatove urban hromada
- Country: Ukraine
- Oblast: Luhansk
- Raion: Svatove

Area
  - Total: 1,038.7 km^{2} (401.0 sq mi)

Population (2020)
  - Total: 26,425
  - Density: 25.440/km^{2} (65.890/sq mi)
- Settlements: 24
- Cities: 1
- Rural settlements: 3
- Villages: 20

Svatove urban hromada (Ukrainian: Сватівська міська громада) is a hromada of Ukraine, located in Svatove Raion, Luhansk Oblast. Its administrative center is the city Svatove.

It has an area of 1,038.7 square kilometres (401.0 mi^{2}) and a population of 26,425, as of 2020.

The hromada contains 24 settlements: 1 city (Svatove), 20 villages:

- Andriivka
- Barykine
- Honcharivka
- Dachne
- Zmiivka
- Ivanivka
- Korzhov
- Kruhle
- Mankivka
- Milovatka
- Mystki
- Novomykilske
- Novopreobrazhenne
- Pavlivka
- Promin
- Rudivka
- Svistunivka
- Travneve
- Khomyvka
- Chepyhivka

And 3 rural-type settlements: Zahidniy, Lahydne, and Sosnovy.

== See also ==
- List of hromadas of Ukraine
