= Lozno-Oleksandrivka =

Urban locality in Luhansk Oblast, Ukraine

Lozno-Oleksandrivka Лозно-Олександрівка
- Rural settlement
- Location of Lozno-Oleksandrivka within Luhansk Oblast#Location of Lozno-Oleksandrivka within Ukraine Lozno-Oleksandrivka (Ukraine)
- Coordinates: 49°50′18″N 38°44′10″E
- Country: Ukraine
- Oblast: Luhansk Oblast
- District: Svatove Raion
- Founded: 1705
- Elevation: 97 m (318 ft)

Population (2022)
  - Total: 829
- Time zone: UTC+2 (EET)
  - Summer (DST): UTC+3 (EEST)
- Postal code: 93747
- Area code: +380 6462

Lozno-Oleksandrivka (Ukrainian: Лозно-Олександрівка) is a rural settlement in Svatove Raion (district) in Luhansk Oblast of eastern Ukraine. Population: 829 (2022 estimate)

Until 18 July 2020, Lozno-Oleksandrivka was located in Bilokurakyne Raion. The raion was abolished on 18 July 2020 as part of the administrative reform of Ukraine, which reduced the number of raions of Luhansk Oblast to eight, of which only four were controlled by the government. The area of Bilokurakyne Raion was merged into Svatove Raion.

== Demographics ==
Native language distribution as of the Ukrainian Census of 2001:

- Ukrainian: 93.65%
- Russian: 6.27%
