= Bohdan Yermakov =

Ukrainian artist and poet

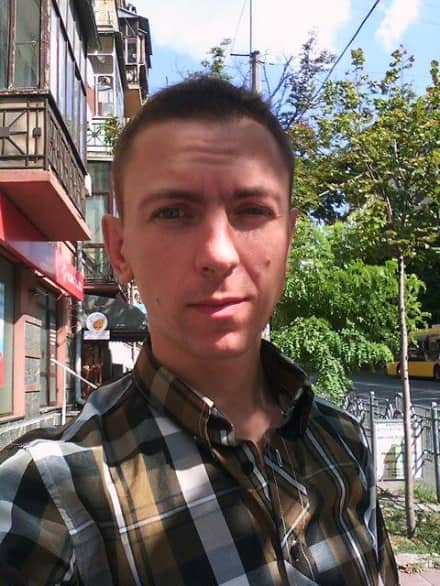
- Born: 28 March 1985; Troitske, Luhansk Oblast, USSR
- Education: European School of Design
- Known for: Painting
- Style: Realism

Bohdan Oleksandrovych Yermakov (Ukrainian: Богдан Олександрович Єрмаков; born 28 March 1985) Ukrainian artist and poet. He is best known for his realistic rural landscapes.

== Biography ==
Bogdan Yermakov was born in the family of the artist and designer Yermakov Alexander Vyacheslavovich. From an early age, Bogdan loved drawing and often came to his father's workshop. His received instruction and mentorship from Ermakov A.V. and Kovalchuk V.I. After the death of Alexander Yermakov in 2000, he tried to enter the Lugansk Art College and but did not gain passing points. At 16, he moved to Boyarka, in Kyiv, where he continued to paint. From 2002 to 2012 he was engaged in architecture and design. In 2012, he returned to landscape painting. He graduated from the European School of Design, Kyiv in 2014. Among his most major influences are Levitan, Monet, Aivazovsky, and Clover.

== Selected paintings ==
- Autumn Oak, 2017 — Boyarka Museum of Local Lore Boyarka.
- Ukrainian field, 2018 — Great Britain City of London.
- Slopes of the Dnieper in Lutezh, 2018 — Bulgaria city Sofia

== Exhibitions ==
- 2015 — UK/RAINE Competition for young artists from Ukraine and the UK (FIRTASH FOUNDATION), Kyiv.
- SHOWER COLORS 2018 — supported by the embassy for Latvia, Central House of Artists, Kyiv.
- FROM MALANKA TO JORDAN 2020 — Verkhovna Rada of Ukraine, Kyiv.
