= Preobrazhenne =

Preobrazhenne Преображе́нне
- Village
- Location within Luhansk Oblast Location within Ukraine
- Coordinates: 49°32′11″N 38°9′14″E
- Country: Ukraine
- Oblast: Luhansk Oblast
- Raion: Svatove Raion

Population
  - Total: 906

Preobrazhenne (Ukrainian: Преображе́нне) is a village in Ukraine, located in Svatove Raion, Luhansk Oblast. It has a population of 906.

Due to the Holodomor, a manmade famine in Soviet Ukraine from 1932 to 1933, 245 people from the village are documented to have died.
