= Molodetske, Horlivka Raion, Donetsk Oblast =

Molodetske Молодецьке
- Rural settlement
- Location within Ukraine
- Coordinates: 48°01′45″N 38°27′24″E
- Country: Ukraine
- Oblast: Donetsk Oblast

Population (2001 census)
  - Total: 1,004
- Time zone: UTC+2 (EET)
  - Summer (DST): UTC+3 (EEST)
- Postal code: 86211
- Area code: +380 6255

Molodetske (Ukrainian: Молодецьке) is a rural settlement in Horlivka Raion, Donetsk Oblast, eastern Ukraine. As of 2001 it had a population of 1004 people.
