= Svatove =

City in Luhansk Oblast, Ukraine

Svatove Сватове
- City
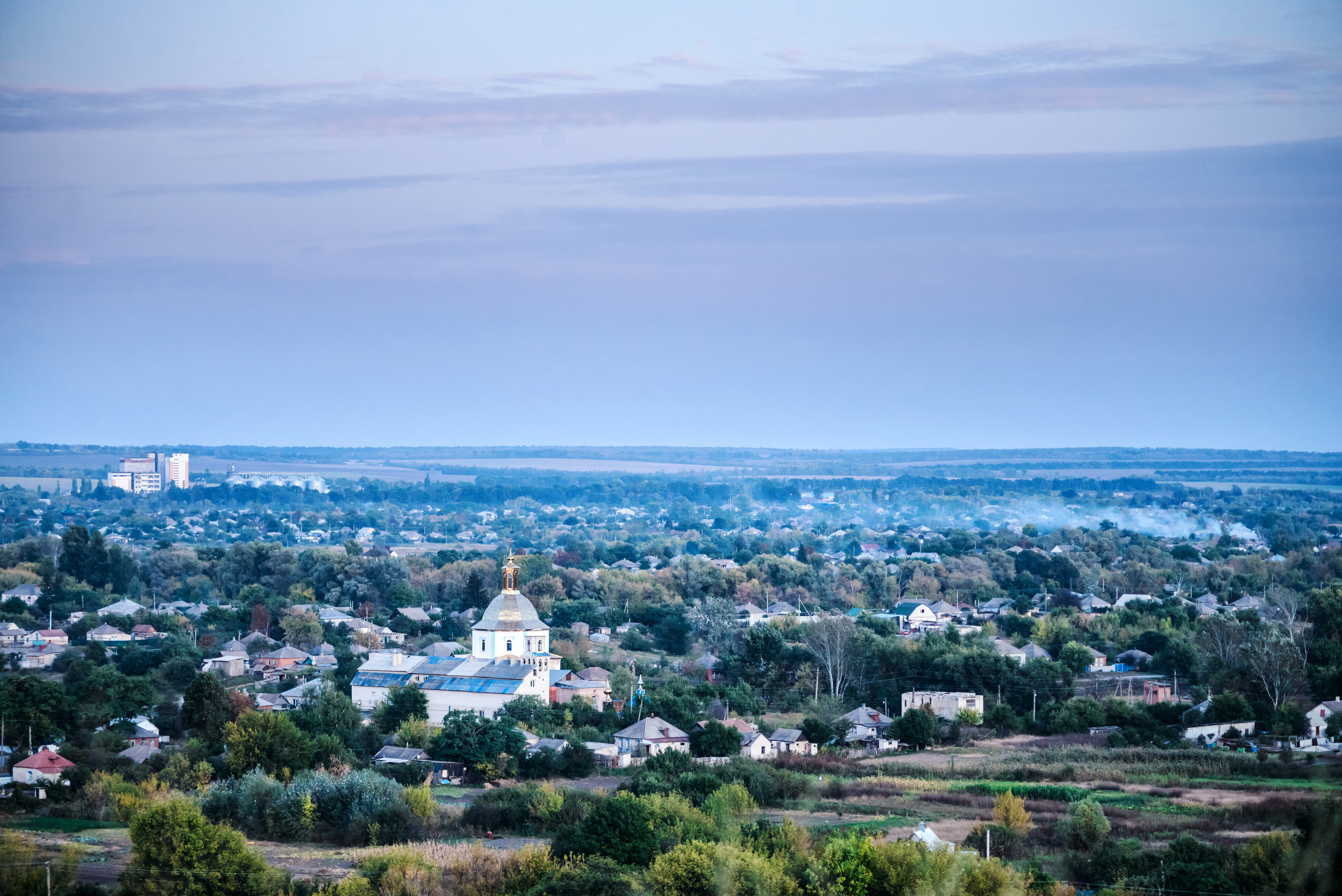
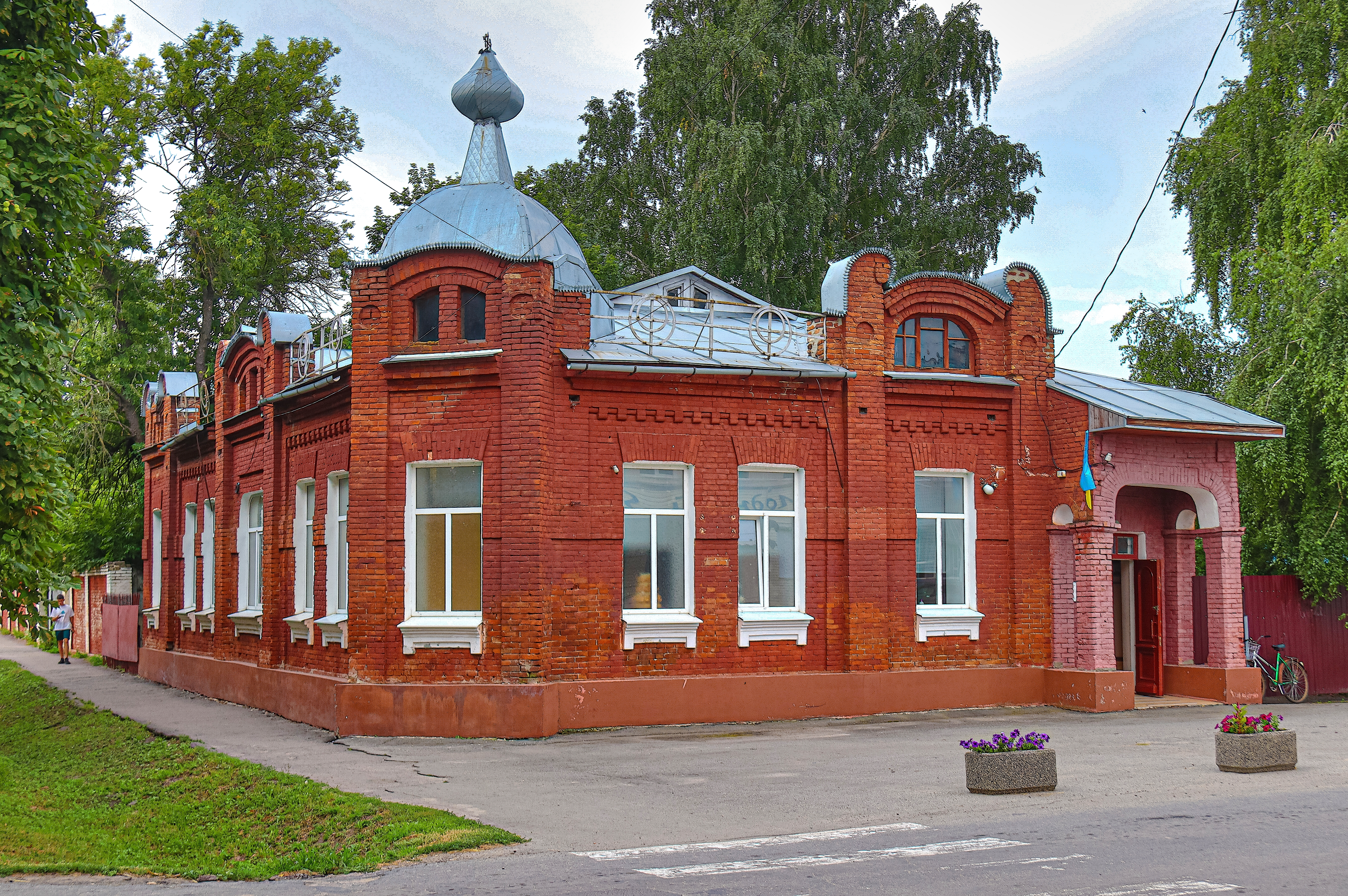
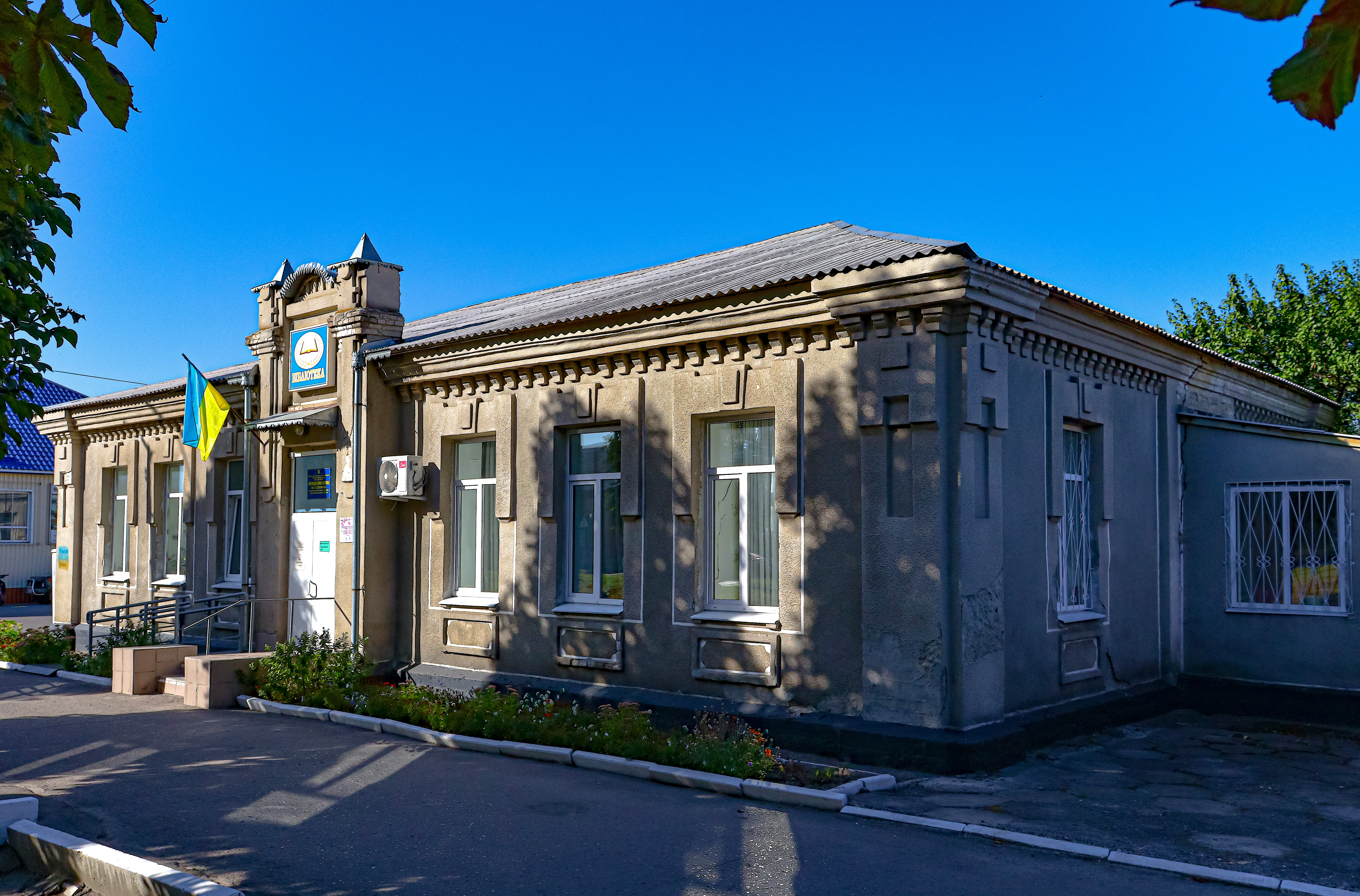
- Panorama of Svatove Local history museum Former rural administration building

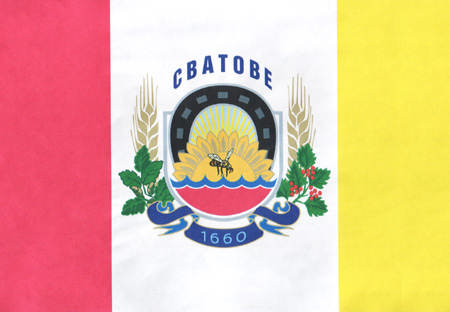
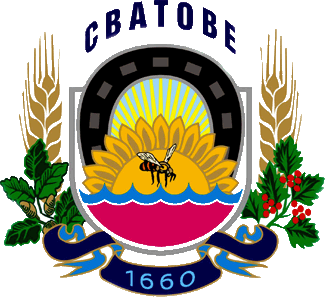
- Flag Coat of arms
- Interactive map of Svatove
- Location of Svatove within Ukraine Location of Svatove in Luhansk Oblast
- Coordinates: 49°24′54″N 38°09′18″E
- Country: Ukraine
- Oblast: Luhansk Oblast
- Raion: Svatove Raion
- Hromada: Svatove urban hromada
- Founded: 1708

Government
  - Mayor: Viktoria Slipets

Population (2022)
  - Total: 16,145
- Area code: (+380)
- Vehicle registration: BB / 13

Svatove (Ukrainian: Сватове, pronounced [ˈswɑtowe]; Russian: Сватово, romanized: Svatovo, pronounced [ˈsvatəvə]) is a city on the Krasna River in Luhansk Oblast, eastern Ukraine. It serves as the administrative center of Svatove Raion. Its population is 16,145 (2022 estimate). It has been occupied by Russia since 2022.

== History ==
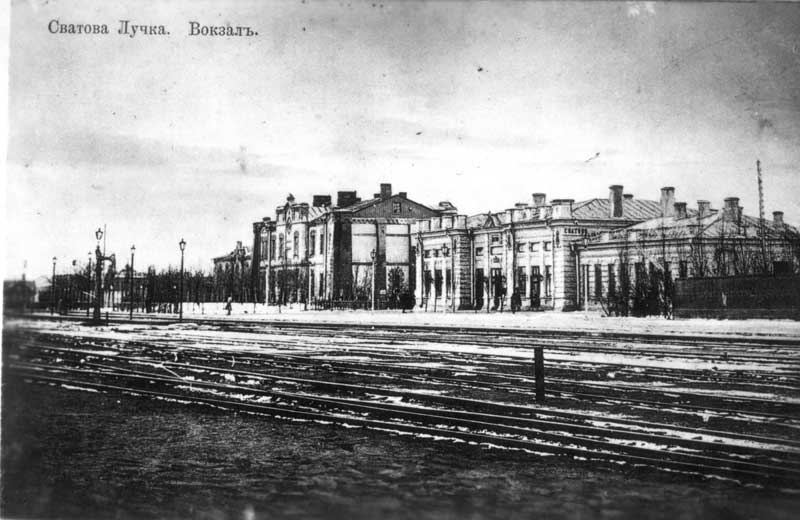
Railway station in 1914

The settlement was founded in 1708 by Ukrainian Cossacks. During the Ukrainian War of Independence, from 1917 to 1920, it passed between various factions. Afterwards it was administratively part of the Kharkiv Governorate of Ukraine.

After the proclamation of the separatist Luhansk People's Republic on 27 April 2014, Luhansk Oblast became a battlefield of the war in Donbas. Svatove stayed under Ukrainian governmental control. The separatist referendum on 11 May 2014 on independence was not held in the city.

On 29–30 October 2015, two people were reported dead and eight wounded as a result of explosions caused by fire at the munitions depot in Svatove.

During the 2022 Russian invasion of Ukraine, Svatove was occupied by Russian and Luhansk People's Republic forces on 3 March 2022. Upon their arrival at the city's outskirts, a crowd of civilians attempted to block the Russian military from entering the settlement. On 8 March, a large crowd of civilians gathered again and demanded the Russian withdrawal from the city. Russian soldiers later threatened to disperse the rally by using lethal force. On 29 July, pro-Ukrainian partisans claimed responsibility for sabotaging railway infrastructure in the city. The Following a major counteroffensive by Ukrainian forces in early September 2022, it was reported that Russian forces were leaving the city. On 14 September, it was reported that Russian troops had returned. Since then, they have occupied the city, and it has served as one of the major nodes of the Luhansk Oblast campaign.

== Geography ==
The city occupies a strategic location in the valley of the Krasna river, with wooded hills to the east and west. The P07 road running SE–NW from Starobilsk to Kupiansk crosses the river and meets the P66 road from Kreminna. A railway was built from Lysychansk in 1894 and extended to Kupiansk in 1895. It is now part of the Donets Railway.

Climate data for Svatove (1981–2010)
Month	Jan	Feb	Mar	Apr	May	Jun	Jul	Aug	Sep	Oct	Nov	Dec	Year
Mean daily maximum °C (°F)	−1.6 (29.1)	−1.0 (30.2)	5.3 (41.5)	15.5 (59.9)	22.3 (72.1)	26.1 (79.0)	28.2 (82.8)	27.6 (81.7)	21.2 (70.2)	13.3 (55.9)	4.7 (40.5)	−0.5 (31.1)	13.4 (56.1)
Daily mean °C (°F)	−4.5 (23.9)	−4.6 (23.7)	0.8 (33.4)	9.4 (48.9)	15.6 (60.1)	19.5 (67.1)	21.5 (70.7)	20.3 (68.5)	14.5 (58.1)	8.0 (46.4)	1.3 (34.3)	−3.3 (26.1)	8.2 (46.8)
Mean daily minimum °C (°F)	−7.3 (18.9)	−7.8 (18.0)	−2.8 (27.0)	4.0 (39.2)	9.0 (48.2)	13.3 (55.9)	15.1 (59.2)	13.5 (56.3)	8.7 (47.7)	3.6 (38.5)	−1.6 (29.1)	−6.0 (21.2)	3.5 (38.3)
Average precipitation mm (inches)	42.1 (1.66)	38.6 (1.52)	33.4 (1.31)	34.9 (1.37)	50.5 (1.99)	62.8 (2.47)	53.5 (2.11)	39.3 (1.55)	50.3 (1.98)	39.3 (1.55)	44.8 (1.76)	42.9 (1.69)	532.4 (20.96)
Average precipitation days (≥ 1.0 mm)	9.5	8.1	7.7	6.8	7.7	8.3	7.2	4.6	6.2	5.8	7.0	8.7	87.6
Average relative humidity (%)	84.2	81.8	77.4	65.1	61.3	65.3	65.7	63.9	69.6	76.4	84.1	84.9	73.3
Source: World Meteorological Organization

== Demography ==
In 2021 it had a population of 16,420.

Ethnic makeup of the population as of 2001:

Ethnic groups in Svatove
	percent
Ukrainians	89.87%
Russians	8.61%
Armenians	0.50%
Belarusians	0.31%
Azerbaijanis	0.12%

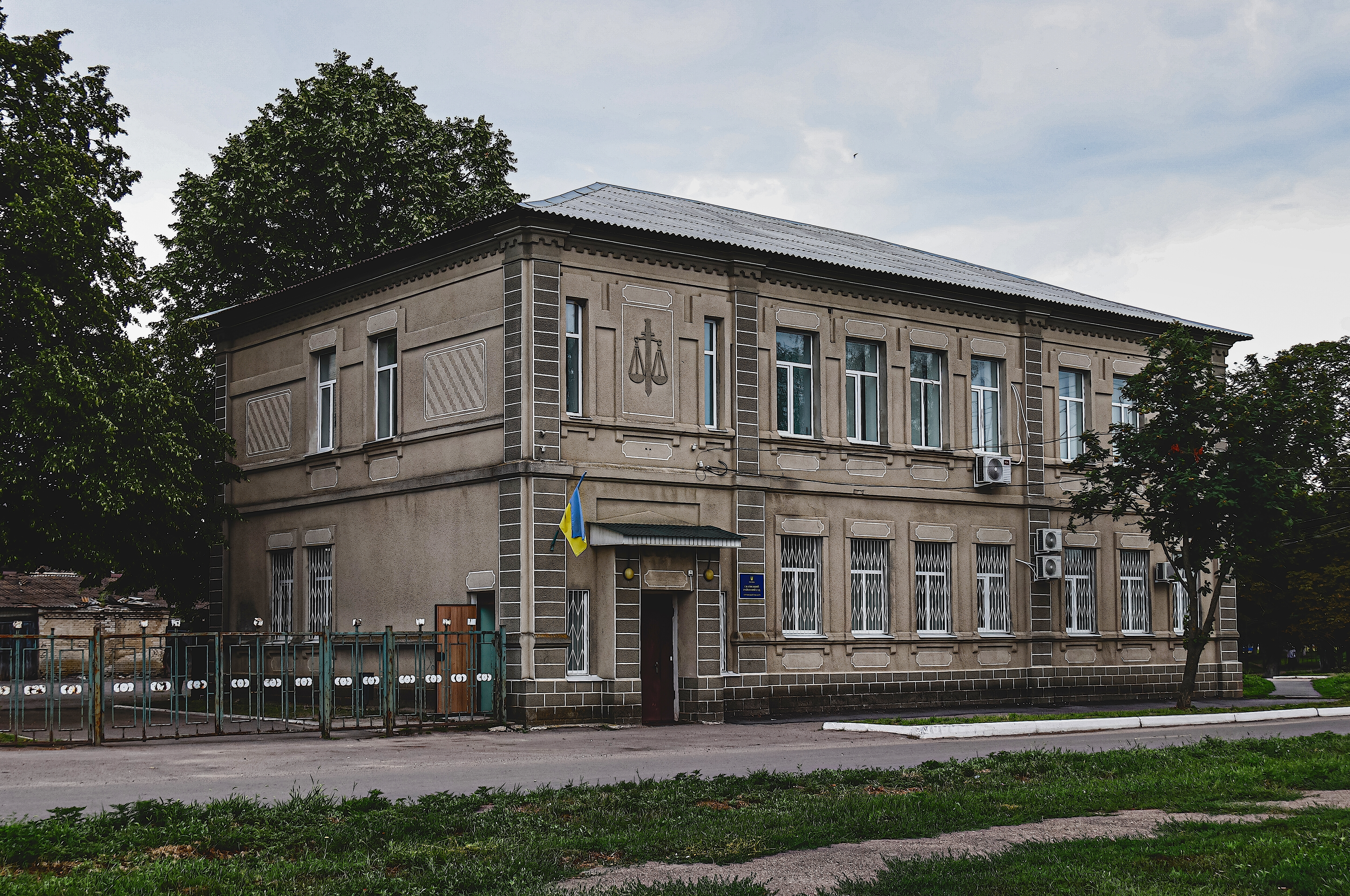
District court

=== Language ===
Distribution of the population by native language according to the 2001 census:

Language	Number	Percentage
Ukrainian	17 349	89.51%
Russian	1 879	9.69%
Other^{[a]}	155	0.80%
Total	19 383	100.00%

^{a} Those who did not indicate their native language or indicated a language that was native to less than 1% of the local population.

== Economy ==
The town primarily serves the surrounding agricultural area, with some metal working, textiles and light industry. There is a processing plant for sunflower oil that was built in 1902–03.

== Culture, community and landmarks ==
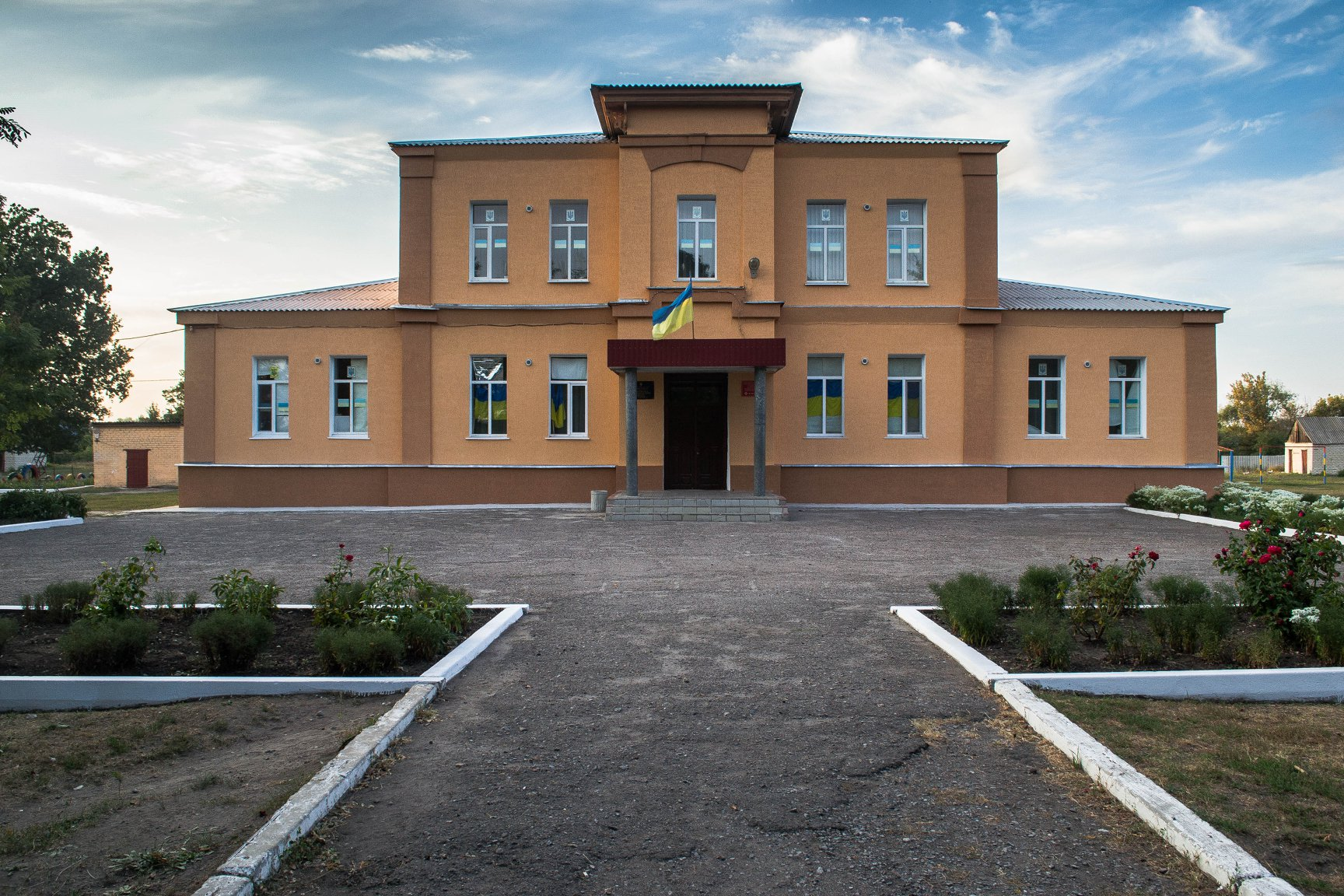
Secondary School No. 1

The Svatove district museum of local history was founded in 1962 and has over 10,000 objects. There is a Memorial of Glory, Memory and Sorrow in the centre of the city, and a steam locomotive monument on Pryvokzalny Square. There is a Church of the Assumption of the Blessed Virgin Mary.

The former Theological Seminary is now the Number 1 Secondary School. There are five secondary schools and five primary schools. There is a specialist sports school. Svatovo's Municipal Housing and Utilities Enterprise maintains 112 residential buildings, including 44 multi-storey buildings and 6 dormitories. The company repairs roofs, heating systems, removes garbage, landscapes, and more.

A local newspaper has been published in the city since September 1931.

== Notable people ==
Yaroslav Yampol is a footballer who played for Ukraine at youth team level and As of 2022 is playing for Świt Nowy Dwór Mazowiecki in Poland.
