= Malynivka, Kharkiv Oblast =

Rural locality in Kharkiv Oblast, Ukraine

Malynivka Малинівка
- Rural settlement
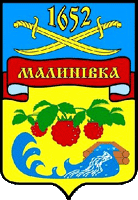
- Coat of arms

- Location in Kharkiv Oblast Location in Ukraine
- Coordinates: 49°47′50″N 36°42′50″E
- Country: Ukraine
- Oblast: Kharkiv Oblast
- Raion: Chuhuiv Raion

Population (2022)
  - Total: 7,428
- Time zone: UTC+2 (EET)
  - Summer (DST): UTC+3 (EEST)

Malynivka (Ukrainian: Малинівка) is a rural settlement in Chuhuiv Raion of Kharkiv Oblast in Ukraine. It is located on the right bank of the Donets. Malynivka hosts the administration of Malynivka settlement hromada, one of the hromadas of Ukraine. Population: 7,428 (2022 estimate).

Until 26 January 2024, Malynivka was designated urban-type settlement. On this day, a new law entered into force which abolished this status, and Malynivka became a rural settlement.

== Geography ==
Malynivka is located in the central and northern parts of the Kharkiv Oblast.

The territory of Malynivka is located on the Central Russian Upland, within the forest steppe natural zone. The relief of the settlement is an undulating plain with ravines and gullies.

The climate of Malynivka is temperate continental with cold winters and hot summers. The average annual temperature is +8.7 °C (in January -4.5, in July +22). The average annual rainfall is 520 mm. The highest rainfall occurs in the summer. There are large forest areas (pine and deciduous trees) on the territory of the settlement. Malynivka is located on the left bank of the Siverskyi Donets River, 4 km from the town of Chuguev. The soils of the community are chernozems and meadow soils.

Mineral resources of Malynivka: loams, clays, sandstones.

== Economy ==
Agriculture and processing industries will be developed in the village; Malynivka is known for its flour and greenhouse vegetables. The Prime distillery operates in the village.

=== Transportation ===
Malynivka railway station is on the railway connecting Kharkiv and Kupiansk-Vuzlovyi. There is passenger traffic.

The settlement has road access to Highway M03 connecting Kharkiv and Sloviansk.
