= Bilokurakyne Raion =

Former subdivision of Luhansk Oblast, Ukraine

Bilokurakyne Raion Білокуракинський район
- Raion
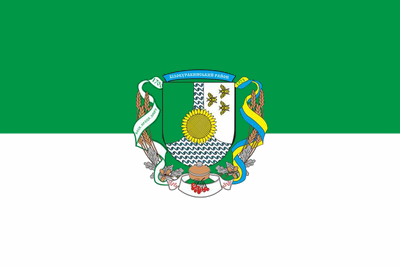
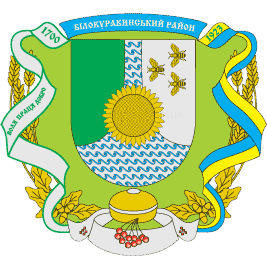
- Flag Coat of arms

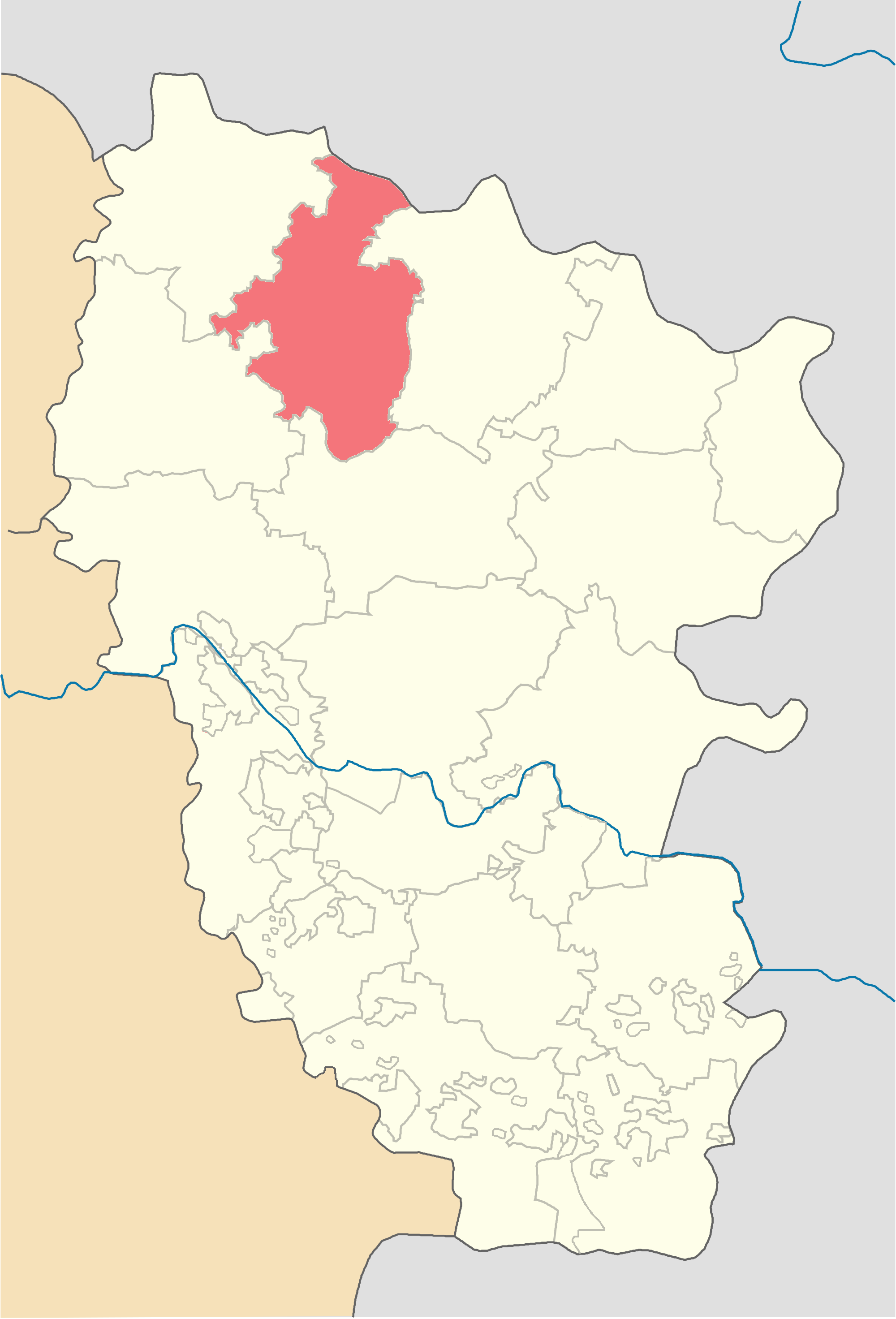
- Coordinates: 49°37′2″N 38°42′23″E
- Country: Ukraine
- Region: Luhansk Oblast
- Established: 1923
- Disestablished: 18 July 2020
- Admin. center: Bilokurakyne
- Subdivisions: List: 0 — city councils; 2 — settlement councils; 13 — rural councils; Number of localities: 0 — cities; 2 — urban-type settlements; 49 — villages; 1 — rural settlements

Government
  - Governor: Oleksandr Didenko

Area
  - Total: 1,436 km^{2} (554 sq mi)

Population (2020)
  - Total: 18,307 ▼
  - Density: 12.75/km^{2} (33.02/sq mi)
- Time zone: UTC+02:00 (EET)
  - Summer (DST): UTC+03:00 (EEST)
- Postal index: 92200—92253
- Area code: +380 6462
- Website: http://bk.loga.gov.ua

Belokurakinsky Municipal District Белокуракинсикй муниципальный округ (Russian)
- District

Other transcription(s)
  - Ukrainian: Білокуракинський район
- Flag Coat of arms

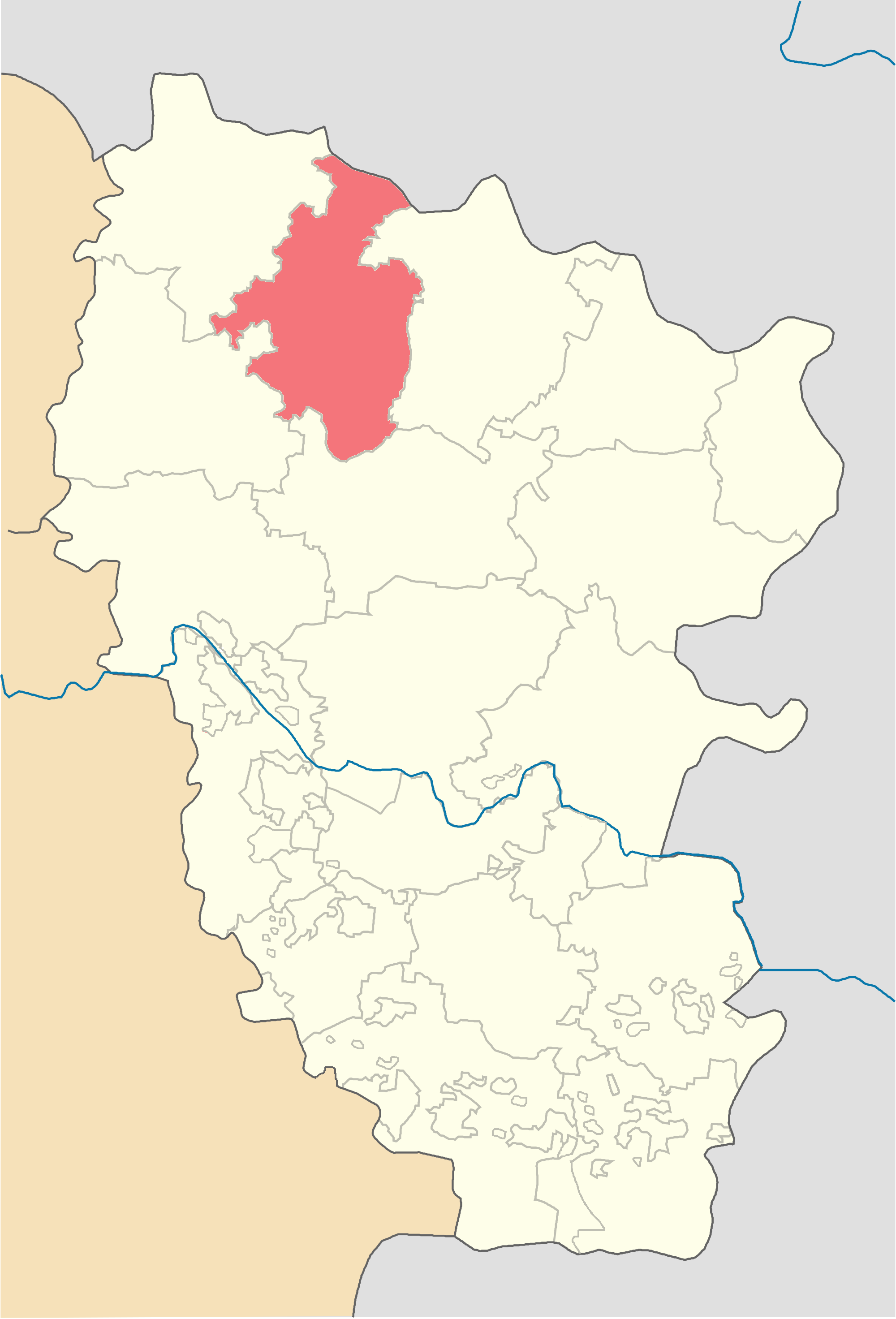
- Location of Belokurakinsky District in the Luhansk People's Republic
- Coordinates: 49°37′2″N 38°42′23″E
- Country: Russia
- Federal subject: Luhansk People's Republic
- Established: 1923
- Administrative center: Belokurakino

Area
  - Total: 1,436 km^{2} (554 sq mi)
- Website: https://belokurakino.su

Bilokurakyne Raion (Ukrainian: Білокуракинський район) was a raion (district) in Luhansk Oblast in eastern Ukraine. The administrative center of the district was the urban-type settlement of Bilokurakyne. The raion was abolished on 18 July 2020 as part of the administrative reform of Ukraine, which reduced the number of raions of Luhansk Oblast to eight, of which only four were controlled by the government. The last estimate of the raion population was 18,307 (2020 est.).

After the proclamation of the separatist Luhansk People's Republic on 27 April 2014 the province of Luhansk became a battlefield of the War in Donbass. Bilokurakyne Raion stayed under Ukrainian governmental control. The separatist referendum on 11 May on independence was not held in the Raion.

== Demographics ==
As of the 2001 Ukrainian census:

Ethnicity

- Ukrainians: 90.7%
- Russians: 8.5%
- Belarusians: 0.2%
