= Troitske Raion =

Former subdivision of Luhansk Oblast, Ukraine

Troitske Raion Троїцький район
- Raion
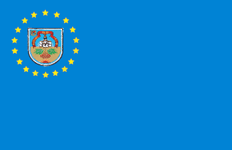
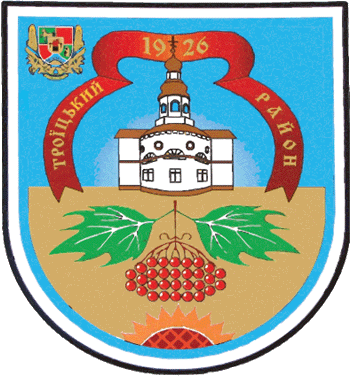
- Flag Coat of arms

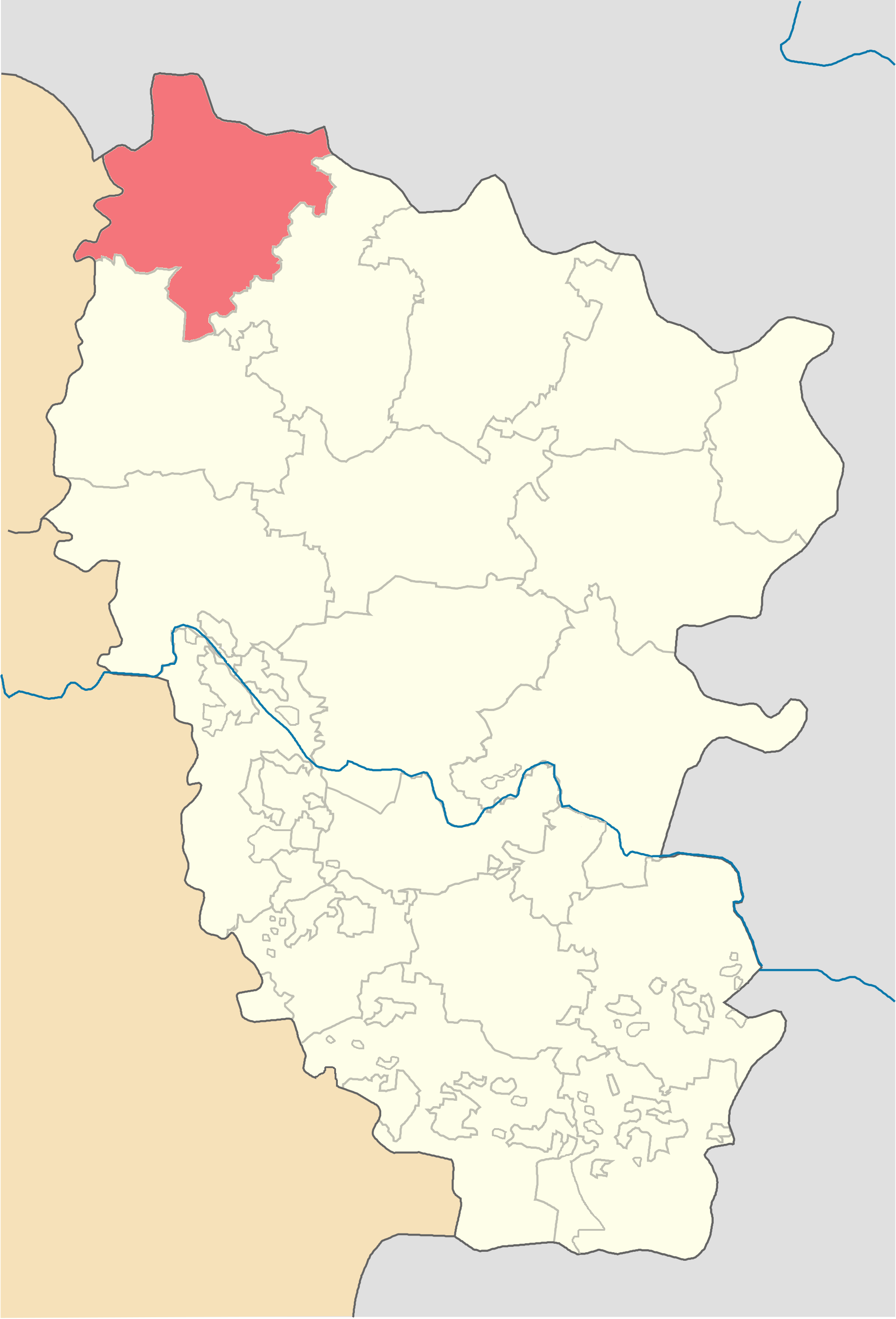
- Coordinates: 49°49′48″N 38°20′14″E
- Country: Ukraine
- Oblast: Luhansk Oblast
- Established: 1926
- Disestablished: 18 July 2020
- Admin. center: Troitske
- Subdivisions: List: 0 — city councils; 6 — settlement councils; 8 — rural councils; Number of localities: 0 — cities; 6 — urban-type settlements; 21 — villages; 15 — rural settlements

Government
  - Governor: Sergiy Krupoderya

Area
  - Total: 1,600 km^{2} (620 sq mi)

Population (2020)
  - Total: 18,932 ▼
  - Density: 12/km^{2} (31/sq mi)
- Time zone: UTC+02:00 (EET)
  - Summer (DST): UTC+03:00 (EEST)
- Postal index: 92100—92145
- Area code: +380 6456
- Website: http://tr.loga.gov.ua

Troitsky Municipal District Троицкий муниципальный округ (Russian)
- District

Other transcription(s)
  - Ukrainian: Троїцький район
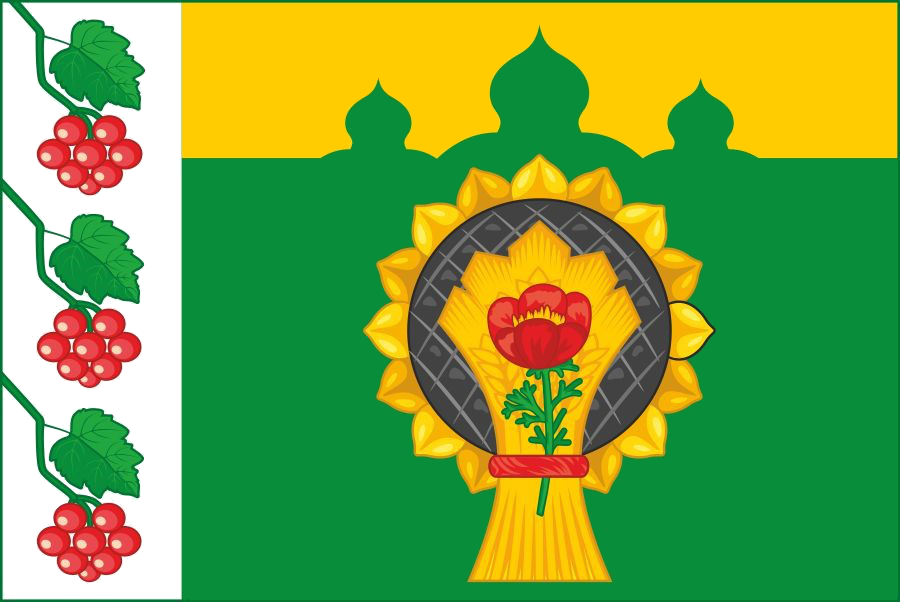
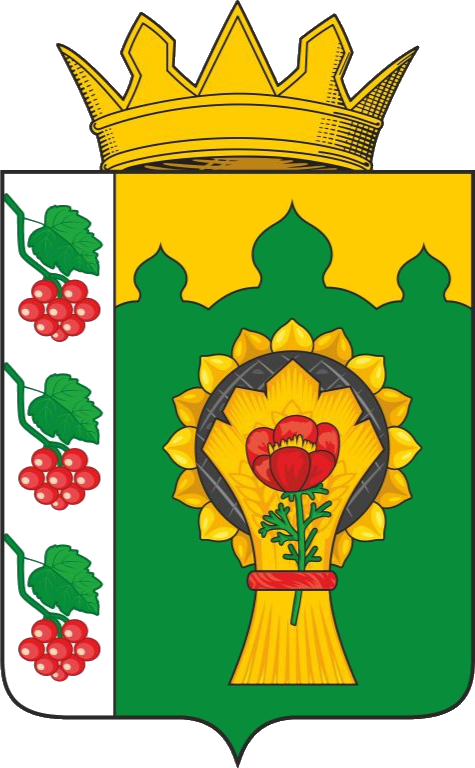
- Flag Coat of arms

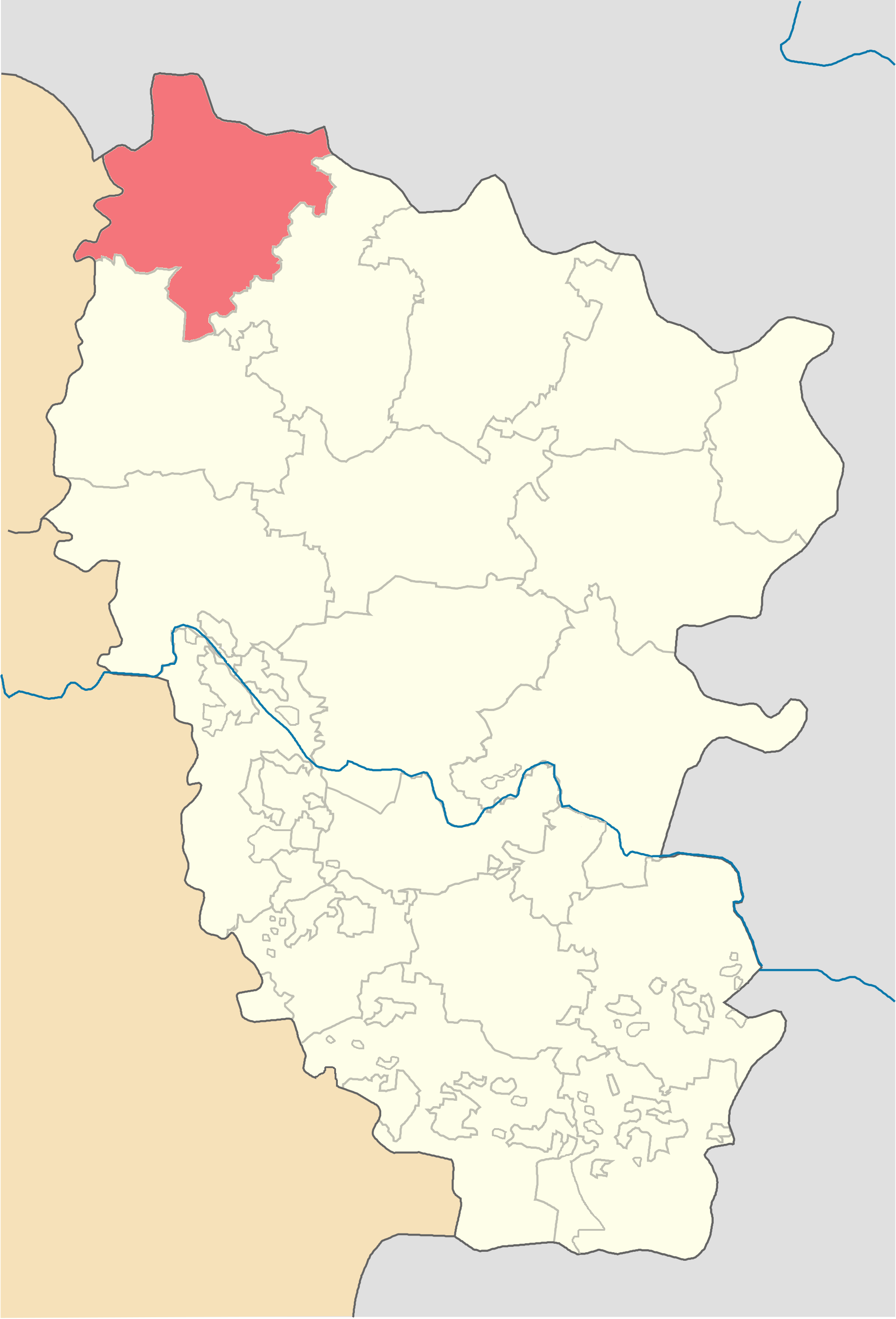
- Location of Troitsky District in the Luhansk People's Republic
- Coordinates: 49°49′48″N 38°20′14″E
- Country: Russia
- Federal subject: Luhansk People's Republic
- Established: 1926
- Administrative center: Troitskoye

Area
  - Total: 1,600 km^{2} (620 sq mi)
- Website: https://troitsklnr.ru

Troitske Raion (Ukrainian: Троїцький район) was a raion (district) in Luhansk Oblast in eastern Ukraine. The administrative center of the raion was the urban-type settlement of Troitske. The raion was abolished on 18 July 2020 as part of the administrative reform of Ukraine, which reduced the number of raions of Luhansk Oblast to eight, of which only four were controlled by the government. The last estimate of the raion population was 18,932 (2020 est.).

== Demographics ==
As of the 2001 Ukrainian census:

Ethnicity

- Ukrainians: 68%
- Russians: 31.1%
- Belarusians: 0.3%
