= Svatove Raion =

Subdivision of Luhansk Oblast, Ukraine

Svatove Raion Сватівський район
- Raion
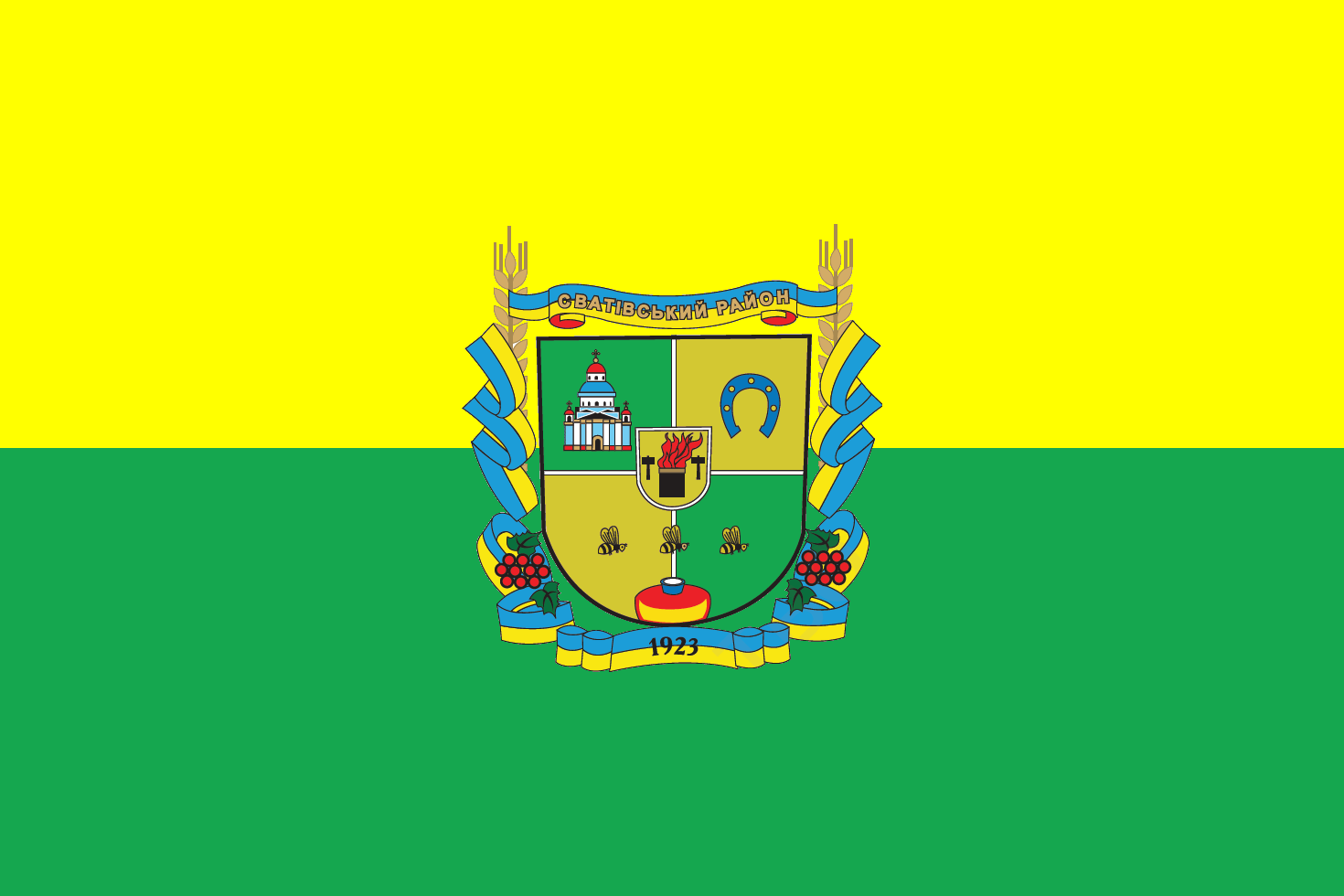
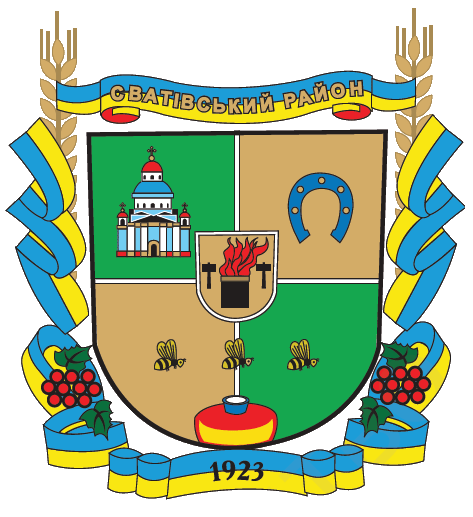
- Flag Coat of arms
- Interactive map of Svatove Raion
- Coordinates: 49°27′40″N 38°12′17″E
- Country: Ukraine
- Oblast: Luhansk Oblast
- Established: 1923
- Admin. center: Svatove
- Subdivisions: 7 hromadas

Government
  - Governor: Volodymyr Mormul`

Area
  - Total: 1,740 km^{2} (670 sq mi)

Population (2022)
  - Total: 76,693
  - Density: 44.1/km^{2} (114/sq mi)
- Time zone: UTC+02:00 (EET)
  - Summer (DST): UTC+03:00 (EEST)
- Postal index: 92600—92655
- Area code: +380 6471
- Website: http://svt.loga.gov.ua

Svatovsky Municipal District Сватовский муниципальный округ (Russian)
- District

Other transcription(s)
  - Ukrainian: Сватівський район
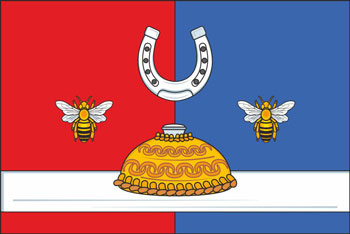
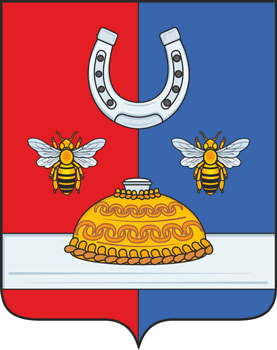
- Flag Coat of arms

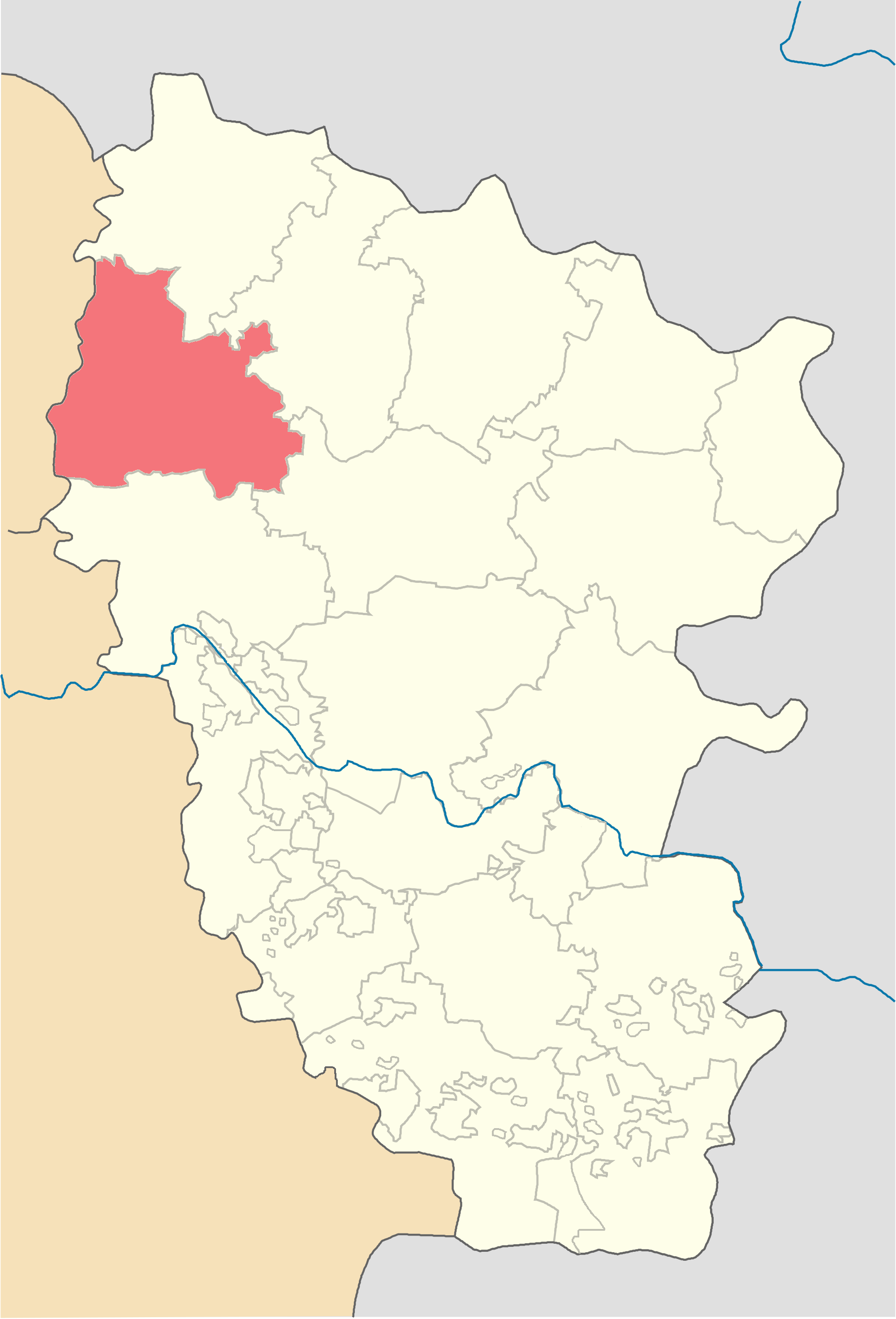
- Location of Svatovsky District in the Luhansk People's Republic
- Coordinates: 49°27′40″N 38°12′17″E
- Country: Russia
- Federal subject: Luhansk People's Republic
- Established: 1923
- Administrative center: Svatovo

Area
  - Total: 1,740 km^{2} (670 sq mi)
- Website: https://svatovolnr.ru

Svatove Raion (Ukrainian: Сватівський район, romanized: Svativskyi raion) is a raion (district) in Luhansk Oblast of eastern Ukraine. the administrative center of the raion is the city of Svatove. Population: 76,693 (2022 estimate).

On 18 July 2020, as part of the administrative reform of Ukraine, the number of raions of Luhansk Oblast was reduced to eight. The area of Svatove Raion was significantly expanded. The January 2020 estimate of the raion population was 33,302 (2020 est.).

== Subdivisions ==
The raion contains seven hromadas:

- Bilokurakyne settlement hromada
- Kolomyichykha rural hromada
- Krasnorichenske settlement hromada
- Lozno-Oleksandrivka settlement hromada
- Nyzhnia Duvanka settlement hromada
- Svatove urban hromada
- Troitske settlement hromada

== Demographics ==
As of the 2001 Ukrainian census:

Ethnicity

- Ukrainians: 91.4%
- Russians: 7.3%
- Belarusians: 0.3%
