= List of villages in Luhansk Oblast =

The following is a list of villages in the Luhansk Oblast of Ukraine, categorised by raion (district).

== Alchevsk Raion ==
- Bohdanivka
- Dovhe
- Krasnyi Lyman
- Molodizhne
- Novooleksandrivka
- Pryshyb
- Smile
- Slovianoserbsk

== Dovzhansk Raion ==
- Bilenke
- Kalynivka

== Luhansk Raion ==
- Illiriia
- Kamianka
- Krasnyi Yar
- Metalist
- Mykolaivka
- Pankivka
- Verkhnia Krasnianka
- Vesela Hora
- Zhovte

== Rovenky Raion ==
- Zelenyi Hai

== Shchastia Raion ==
- Artema
- Chuhinka
- Krasna Talivka
- Kriakivka
- Krymske
- Lobacheve
- Lopaskyne
- Malynove
- Pobieda
- Staryi Aidar
- Syze
- Trokhizbenka

== Sievierodonetsk Raion ==
- Chervonopopivka
- Katerynivka
- Lysychanskyi
- Novozvanivka
- Orikhove
- Prychepylivka
- Shypylivka
- Sokilnyky
- Synetskyi
- Troitske
- Ustynivka
- Verkhnokamyanka
- Voevodivka
- Zatyshne
- Zholobok
- Zolotarivka

== Starobilsk Raion ==
- Berezove
- Lozove
- Rannia Zoria
- Sychanske

== Svatove Raion ==
- Hrekivka
- Makiivka
- Tymonove
- Zaitseve
