= 111th Territorial Defense Brigade =

Ukrainian Territorial Defense Forces unit

- Ukrainian: 111-та окрема бригада територіальної оборони
- Active: 26 June 2018 - present
- Country: Ukraine
- Branch: Armed Forces of Ukraine
- Type: Military reserve force
- Role: Light infantry
- Part of: Territorial Defense Forces; Operational Command East
- Garrison/HQ: Luhansk Oblast; MUN А7039

Insignia
- Flag

The 111th Territorial Defense Brigade (Ukrainian: 111-та окрема бригада територіальної оборони) is a military formation of the Territorial Defense Forces of Ukraine in Luhansk Oblast. It is part of Operational Command East.

== History ==
=== Formation ===
On 26 June 2018, the brigade was formed in Luhansk Oblast. At time of formation, brigade was made up of only 23 servicemen. 6 battalions were planned in Lysychansk, Rubizhne, Sievierodonetsk, Starobilsk, Svatove and Bilovodsk.

=== Russo-Ukrainian War ===
==== 2022 Russian invasion of Ukraine ====
After 24 February units of the brigade were reinforced with new recruits and numbered over 2,500. Units of the brigade took part in defense of Rubizhne, Sievierodonetsk, Lysychansk, Voevodivka, Pryvillia, Zolote, Hirske, Novotoshkivske, Toshkivka, Bilohorivka, Shypylivka, Vrubivka, Verkhniokamianske, Mykolaivka, Lyman, Yampolivka, Terny, Torske, Kreminna, Ustynivka, Druzhba and Volodymyrivka. The formation was awarded its battle flag on 27 August 2022.

After the brigade was rotated from the front-lines, it was sent Belarus border with Volyn Oblast for rest and training. In July 2023 brigade was still in that area. 59 servicemen of the brigade were awarded with medals and orders. In August 118th battalions was renamed 118th Sievierodonetsk battalion.

== Structure ==
As of 2022 the brigade's structure is as follows:

- Headquarters
- 110th Territorial Defense Battalion (Lysychansk) MUN А727
- 117th Territorial Defense Battalion (Sievierodonetsk) MUN А7276
- 118th Territorial Defense Battalion (Rubizhne) MUN А7284
- 119th Territorial Defense Battalion (Starobilsk) MUN А7285
- 198th Territorial Defense Battalion (Svatove) MUN А7364
- Engineering Company
- Communication Company
- Logistics Company
- Mortar Battery

== Commanders ==
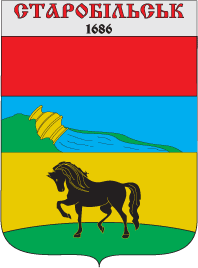
Coat of arms of Starobilsk.

- Lieutenant Colonel Dmytro Kiziiarov 2018 – 2020
- Colonel Viacheslav Sukhanov January 2021 - 2022
- Colonel Vadym Bondarenko 2023 - June 2023
- Colonel Serhii Mamchenko 2023 - present

== Insignia ==
Emblem shows a stylized walking golden horse on green field, which was a historical symbol of Starobilsk sotnia of the Ostrogozhsk Regiment.

== See also ==
- Territorial Defense Forces of the Armed Forces of Ukraine
