= Battle of Lysychansk =

Battle in the Russo-Ukrainian war

Coordinates: 48°55′N 38°25′E

- Part of the eastern front of the Russo-Ukrainian war
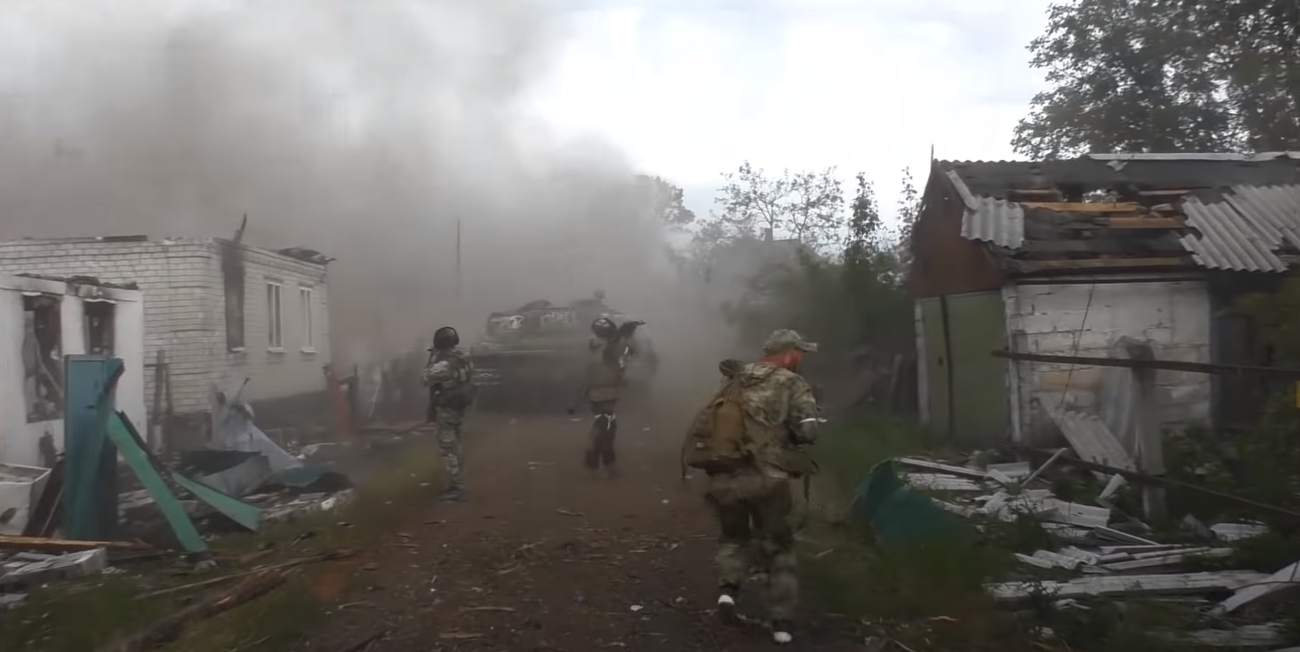
- Pro-Russian separatist troops advance towards Lysychansk
Date	25 June – 2/3 July 2022 (1 week and 1 day)
Location	Lysychansk, Luhansk Oblast, Ukraine
Result	Russian and LPR victory
Territorial changes	Russian and LPR forces capture Lysychansk, Novodruzhesk, Maloriazantseve and Bila Hora; Russian and LPR forces fully occupy Luhansk Oblast

Belligerents
Russia; Luhansk PR	Ukraine

Commanders and leaders
Aleksandr Lapin; Sergey Surovikin	Ivan Marchuk †

Units involved
90th Guards Tank Division; Kadyrovites; Wagner Group 6th Separate Cossack Motor Rifle Regiment	Kastuś Kalinoŭski Regiment 24th Mechanized Brigade

Strength
Unknown	Russian claim: 4,500 troops

Casualties and losses
Unknown	Russian claim: 1,120+ killed 600+ captured
- 8+ civilians killed, 42+ wounded

The Battle of Lysychansk was a military engagement between Russia and Ukraine in the wider battle of Donbas of the eastern Ukraine campaign during the Russo-Ukrainian war. By May 2022, Lysychansk and its twin city of Sievierodonetsk were the two largest cities of the Luhansk Oblast not under Russian control. Russian forces launched an assault on Sievierodonetsk in May where a fierce battle occurred until late June, when Ukrainian forces withdrew from the city. Fighting then continued as Russian forces started to attack Lysychansk across the Donets River.

Russia and the Luhansk People's Republic (LPR) announced their forces had seized Lysychansk on 2–3 July, although Ukraine initially denied the city's capture. The Ukrainian general staff conceded on 3 July that their forces had withdrawn from the city "in order to save the lives of Ukrainian defenders."

Lysychansk was the last Ukrainian stronghold to be captured in Luhansk Oblast, which Russia then claimed to fully control.

== Background ==
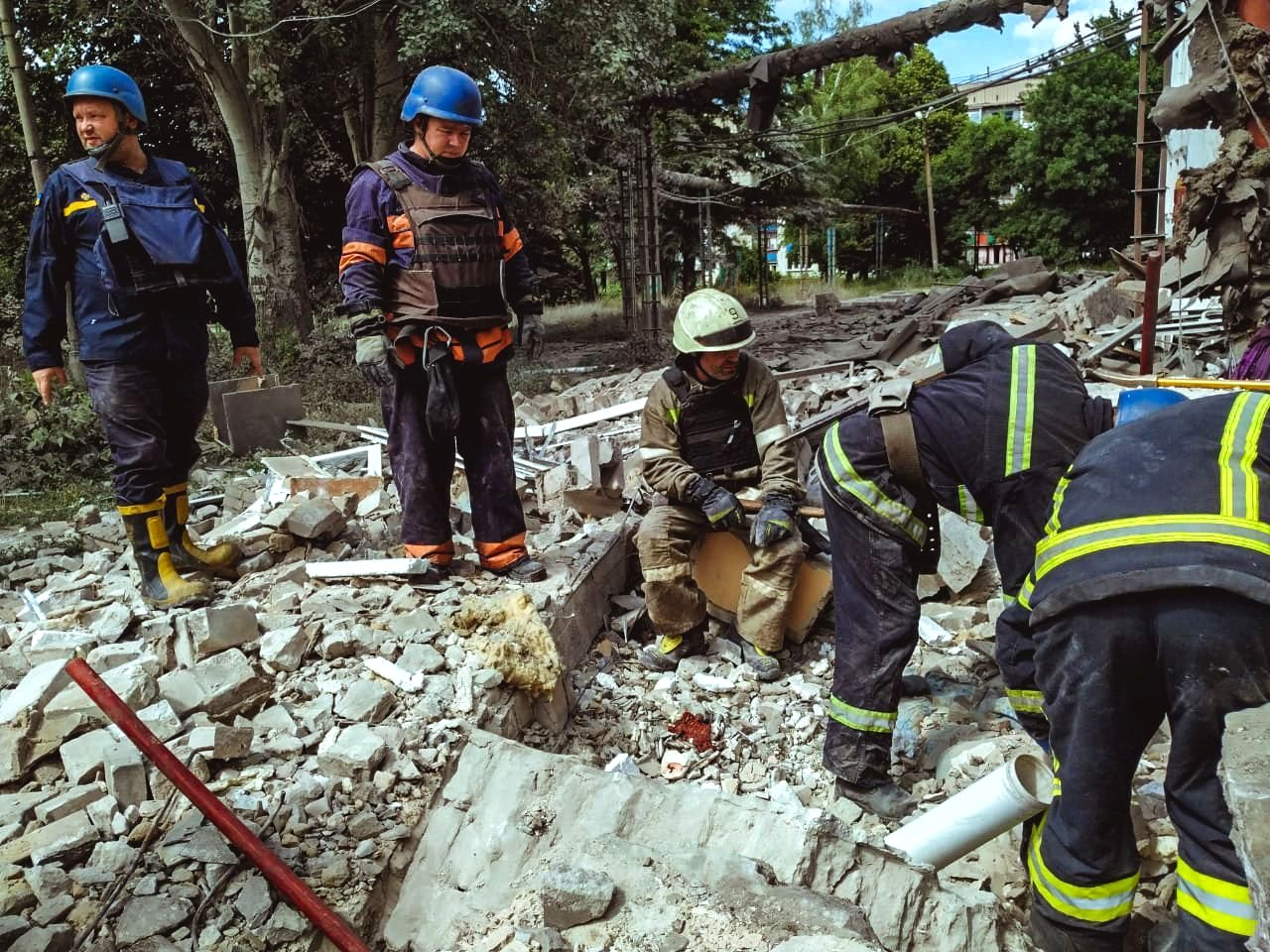
First responders on the scene of a Russian airstrike in Lysychansk, 16 June 2022

The twin cities of Sievierodonetsk and Lysychansk are divided by the Donets river. The hilltop city of Lysychansk is located in the west bank and offered Ukrainian defenders the high ground. On 11 April 2022, Russian forces shelled Lysychansk with heavy artillery, destroying four houses, killing one person, and injuring another three. By 10 May, Lysychansk and Sievierodonetsk had become the only remaining Ukrainian strongholds in the entirety of Luhansk Oblast. During the battle of Sievierodonetsk, the three bridges connecting both cities were destroyed, affording Ukrainian defenders a better defensive position from Russian assaults across the river.

By 23 June, Russia had fully broken through in the south, winning the battle at Toshkivka and making major gains south of Lysychansk. Russian forces captured Loskutivka, Myrna Dolyna, Rai-Oleksandrivka and Pidlisne all on 22 June. On 23 June, Russian forces cut off and surrounded the towns of Hirske and Zolote, which they claimed to have fully captured by the next day. By 25 June, Russia captured Sievierodonetsk. With Russia's breakthrough in the south and their victory in Sievierodonetsk, the attention of the Russian offensive shifted to Lysychansk.

== Battle ==
After the fall of Sievierodonetsk, Lysychansk became the last major city in the Luhansk Oblast under Ukrainian control. Military units of the separatist Luhansk People's Republic (LPR) fought alongside Russian infantry and were supported by Russian artillery and airstrikes. The Russian offensive against Lysychansk was overseen and planned by Aleksandr Lapin, Commander of the Central Military District, and Sergey Surovikin, Commander of the Russian Aerospace Forces. The Institute for the Study of War argued that the involvement of these top-level commanders showcased the importance Russian put into the city's capture. An initial Russian armored assault on Lysychansk was repelled by the pro-Ukrainian forces, with Belarusian volunteers under Ivan "Brest" Marchuk playing a major role in fighting off the tanks.

On 25 June, Russian and separatist units began entering Lysychansk from the south, reaching a mine and a gelatin factory on the outskirts of the city the same day. According to the Institute for the Study of War (ISW), NASA's Fire Information for Resource Management System also showed "heat anomalies" at the gelatin factory, corroborating reports of military activity there. On 26 June, TASS reported that Russian and separatist forces commanded by Lapin had entered the city from five directions and were isolating Ukrainian units, but this report could not be independently verified at the time. The Ukrainian general staff said intensive Russian airstrikes and artillery was aimed at cutting off Lysychansk from the south, but did not mention separatists entering the city. Civilian evacuations had been ordered, and one fleeing civilian interviewed in Pokrovsk called the situation in Lysychansk "a horror". Amid this Russian breakthrough, the Ukrainian defenders were forced into a disorganized retreat, resulting in many losses, including the death of Belarusian commander Marchuk.

On 27 June, CNN reported that civilians in Lysychansk had been urged to leave immediately, as Russian forces gained ground in the city. Video footage taken by people within the city reportedly suggested that some civilians were reluctant to leave their homes, willing to stay regardless of who controlled the city. Ukraine's Lysychansk Military Administration said 10,000–15,000 people remained, and only around 50 people were evacuating per day. Meanwhile, LPR military officers claimed they had cut off two evacuation routes for Ukrainian troops from the city. Russian forces entered the Lysychansk Oil Refinery, located at Verkhnokamyanka, around 10 kilometers southwest of the city center, and consolidated their positions, including setting up artillery posts.

On 28 June, Rodion Miroshnik, the LPR's ambassador to Russia, claimed that Ukrainian forces in Lysychansk had begun withdrawing from the city. The ISW theorized that they were conducting a fighting retreat towards more defensible positions in Siversk, Kramatorsk, and Sloviansk.

On 29 June, Serhiy Haidai, the Ukrainian governor of Luhansk Oblast, said that Russian units had entered the outskirts of Lysychansk, but denied that there were clashes in the city itself, dismissing claims of such as Russian propaganda. He added that the city was being attacked from many directions. Ukrainian Su-25 and Su-24m bombers reportedly carried out "up to 10 airstrikes" in the Lysychansk area, striking Russian and LPR logistics centers, fuel depots, and armored combat vehicles. Ukraine's general staff said that a Russian airstrike was carried out on the Lysychansk Oil Refinery, where ground engagements were reportedly taking place.

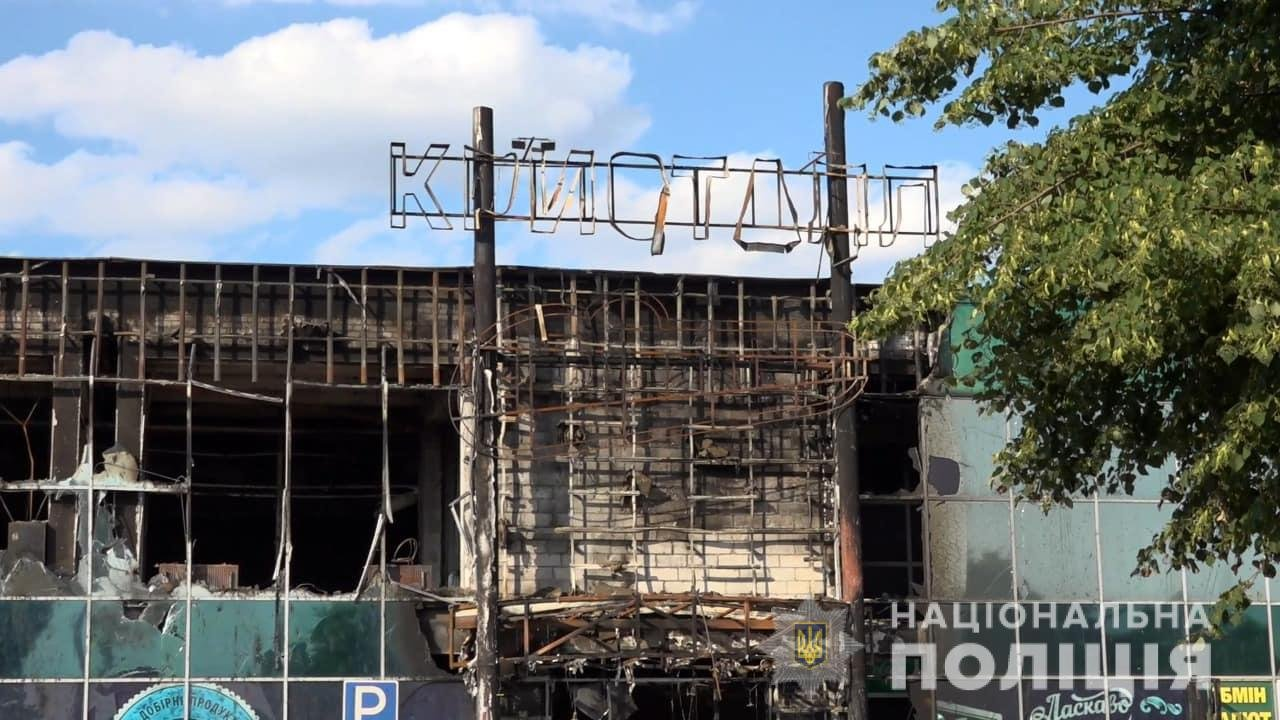
Ruins of the Kristall shopping mall in Lysychansk on 30 June

On 30 June, governor Serhiy Haidai said there was a "peak of fighting" on the outskirts of the city, with "constant" Russian shelling and repeated ground assaults. The British Defence Ministry, in its daily intelligence bulletin, said the clashes were likely centered around the oil refinery and that Ukrainian units in the city proper were holding their positions. The Ukrainian General Staff said the Russians had "partial success" during assaults in the area of the refinery and were controlling the southeastern and northwestern parts of the plant itself. Russian assaults on the village of Topolivka, northeast of the refinery, and the towns of Vovchoiarivka and Maloriazantseve were "partially successful"; and the Topolivka-Lysychansk road came under Russian fire control. A Sky News report highlighted the "shockingly indiscriminate" Russian shelling on Lysychansk and described on-the-ground conditions in the city. Journalist Alex Crawford called the city "unrecognisable" and reported that 60 percent of the city was in ruins, citing a local police officer. The "46th Battalion of the 24th Brigade" defended the Lysychansk Oil Refinery from within a hidden bunker, offering stubborn resistance. With utilities down, civilians remaining in the city had to gather water from a nearby lake and waited on food parcels from aid distributors. Some civilians interviewed by Crawford blamed the Ukrainian and Western governments for their situation rather than Russia, reflecting a "not insignificant" pro-Russian separatist sentiment in the area.

The LPR's Rodion Miroshnik said in a Telegram post that Lysychansk was being attacked from four directions and claimed that Russian units had established a "wide bridgehead" on the right bank of the Donets and had reached the Lysychansk heliport. "From there, with a fairly wide front, they moved in a south-westerly direction towards the city centre." These claims were not independently verified at the time.

By 1 July, the Russian defence ministry said its forces had captured the mine and gelatin plant on the city's outskirts, and the northwestern town of Pryvillia as part of their encirclement, along with continued attempts to cut the Lysychansk-Bakhmut highway. The Russians claimed the Ukrainians were suffering increasing desertions and heavy losses in the area, including over 120 soldiers killed in one village within a day.

=== Fall of Lysychansk ===
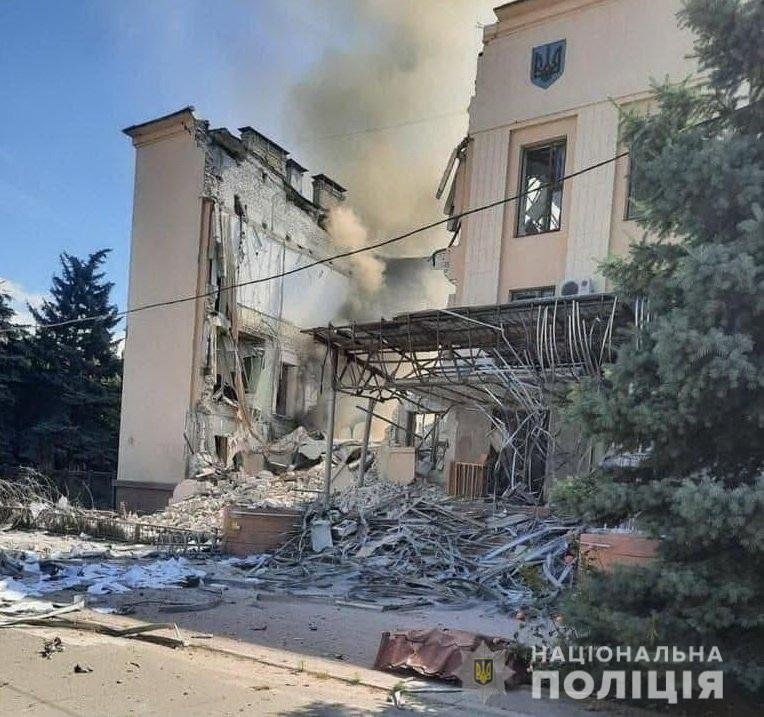
Damaged city council building in Lysychansk on 1 July 2022

On 2 July, governor Serhiy Haidai again noted the incessant, "high density" shelling of Lysychansk, but sought to emphasize that two Russian advances had been repelled in the direction of Verkhniokamyanka and the gelatin plant. The Russian-backed separatists claimed to have completed its encirclement of the city after occupying the "last strategic heights," while the Ukrainian National Guard said fierce clashes were ongoing but the city was "not surrounded". Subsequently, Russian troops were reported to have reached the center of Lysychansk.

Later on 2 July, the separatists announced their forces had seized the city, which was also confirmed by the ISW, saying the capture likely occurred after a withdrawal by Ukrainian forces. The ISW called Ukraine's denial of the city's capture "outdated or erroneous". Rob Lee, a defence blogger covering the war, tweeted videos of Chechen Rosgvardia soldiers outside the administration building in Lysychansk. Pro-Russian sources also tweeted a video of the Soviet Banner of Victory in the ruins of the same building, and a video emerged of residents placing a Soviet flag at the city's "Memorial of Remembrance For The Fallen Soldiers," further corroborating Russian claims of capture.

On 3 July, Oleksiy Arestovych, an advisor to Ukrainian president Volodymyr Zelenskyy, conceded that Lysychansk was in danger of being captured by the Russians. Luhansk governor Serhiy Haidai said the city was attacked "with inexplicably brutal tactics" and the Russians were "stubbornly advancing" amid losses. Russia's defence minister Sergei Shoigu informed president Vladimir Putin that Russian and LPR forces had fully controlled the city, and the LPR said it was being "cleared of Ukrainian nationalists". Observers noted that the fall of Lysychansk meant that Russia had achieved its strategic objective of capturing all of Luhansk Oblast, as part of its larger goal of seizing the entirety of the Donbas.

Later on 3 July, the Ukrainian General Staff confirmed that their forces had withdrawn from Lysychansk, however President Zelenskyy denied that the city was fully captured, saying "...we cannot definitely say that Lysychansk is under [Russian] control. Battles are raging on the outskirts of Lysychansk." Later that night, governor Haidai admitted Lysychansk had fallen and president Zelenskyy vowed to eventually retake the city, "thanks to the increase in the supply of modern weapons."

== Aftermath ==
After the fall of Lysychansk, Russia declared full control over the entirety of Luhansk Oblast and President Vladimir Putin ordered a brief reprieve for the fighters that fought along that front. However, Luhansk governor Serhiy Haidai denied that all of the province had been captured and said that there were ongoing clashes in villages and towns on the western outskirts of Lysychansk, on the approach to Siversk.

On 10 September, Serhiy Haidai claimed Ukrainian forces advanced into the outskirts of Lysychansk during a counteroffensive, in order to liberate the city., though this was not corroborated. However, Ukraine and the ISW claimed Ukrainian control over Bilohorivka.

== Casualties ==
By 25 May, fighting and shelling of Lysychansk had killed 150 civilians.

A Russian strike on a water line on 27 June killed at least 8 civilians and wounded 42. The Governor of Luhansk Oblast Serhiy Haidai said that a large number of those injured from the attack had to undergo surgery and lost limbs. He also reported that this attack had been effectuated with cluster bombs, the use of which is banned by international law (although neither Russia nor Ukraine are party to the Convention on Cluster Munitions). Another banned weapon that the Russians were alleged to be using near Lysychansk, according to Haidai, were anti-personnel mines. These claims were not independently verified at the time.

By 28 June, there were 15,000 civilians still in Lysychansk. 95,000 people lived in the city prior to the invasion.

== Analysis ==
BBC defence correspondent Jonathan Beale observed that there had been initial hopes by Ukrainian defenders that the geographical high ground offered by Lysychansk would provide a natural strong defence, but Russia's encirclement of the city from the south, north, and east, and superior firepower on the tactical level, prompted Ukrainian troops to withdraw before the pocket was completely closed. Beale also noted that Ukrainian officials were "unusually quiet" on 3 July about fighting in the city, possibly not wanting to broadcast any tactical retreat for operational security reasons.
