= Hirske urban hromada =

Hirske urban hromada Гірська міська громада
- Hromada
- Interactive map of Hirske urban hromada
- Country: Ukraine
- Oblast: Luhansk
- Raion: Sievierodonetsk

Area
  - Total: 169.8 km^{2} (65.6 sq mi)

Population (2020)
  - Total: 33,125
  - Density: 195.1/km^{2} (505.3/sq mi)
- Settlements: 11
- Cities: 2
- Villages: 6
- Towns: 3

Hirske urban hromada (Ukrainian: Гірська міська громада) is a hromada of Ukraine, located in Sievierodonetsk Raion, Luhansk Oblast. Its administrative center is the city Hirske.

It has an area of 169.8 square kilometres (65.6 mi^{2}) and a population of 33,125, as of 2020.

The hromada contains 11 settlements: 2 cities (Hirske and Zolote), 3 towns (Nizhne, Novotoshkivske, and Toshkivka), and 6 villages:

- Zholobok
- Katerynivka
- Krymske
- Orikhove
- Prychepylivka
- Sokilnyky

== See also ==
- List of hromadas of Ukraine
