= Lysychansk urban hromada =

Lysychansk urban hromada Лисичанська міська громада
- Hromada
- Interactive map of Lysychansk urban hromada
- Country: Ukraine
- Oblast: Luhansk
- Raion: Sievierodonetsk

Area
  - Total: 407.6 km^{2} (157.4 sq mi)

Population (2020)
  - Total: 113,782
  - Density: 279.2/km^{2} (723.0/sq mi)
- Settlements: 17
- Cities: 3
- Rural settlements: 4
- Villages: 6
- Towns: 4

Lysychansk urban hromada (Ukrainian: Лисичанська міська громада) is a hromada of Ukraine, located in Sievierodonetsk Raion, Luhansk Oblast. Its administrative center is the city Lysychansk.

It has an area of 407.6 square kilometres (157.4 mi^{2}) and a population of 113,782, as of 2020.

The hromada contains 17 settlements: 3 cities (Lysychansk, Novodruzhesk, and Pryvillia), 4 urban-type settlements (Bilohorivka, Vovchoiarivka, Maloriazantseve, and Myrna Dolyna), 6 villages:

- Bila Hora
- Verkhnokamianka
- Zolotarivka
- Rai-Oleksandrivka
- Ustynivka
- Shypylivka

And 4 rural-type settlements: Lysychanskyi, Loskutivka, Pidlisne, and Topolivka.

== See also ==
- List of hromadas of Ukraine
