= Battle of Popasna =

Battle in the Russo-Ukrainian war

- Part of the eastern front of the Russian invasion of Ukraine
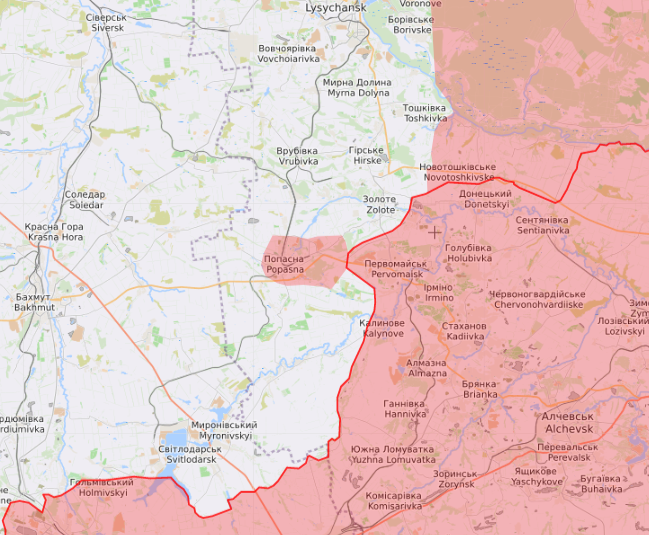
- Frontline situation in Popasna as of 7 May 2022 (data from Liveuamap)
Date	18 April 2022 – 7 May 2022 (2 weeks and 5 days)
Location	Popasna, Sievierodonetsk Raion, Luhansk Oblast, Ukraine 48°37′N 38°21′E
Result	Russian victory
Territorial changes	Russian and LPR forces capture Popasna

Belligerents
Russia; Luhansk People's Republic	Ukraine

Commanders and leaders
Aleksandr Lapin; Roman Kutuzov; Leonid Pasechnik	Valerii Zaluzhnyi; Oleh Mikats; Roman Mamavko

Units involved
155th Guards Naval Infantry Brigade; 76th Guards Air Assault Division; LPR People's Militia; Kadyrovites; Wagner Group	24th Mechanized Brigade (Ukraine)

Casualties and losses
	Russian claim: ~ 1/3 of the 24th Mechanized Brigade personnel lost

In mid-April 2022, a military engagement began in Popasna between Ukrainian and Russian forces. On 7 May, the city came under Russian control.

== Background ==
Popasna is an important regional hub with many roadway junctions key to separatist forces during the war in Donbas and the Russian advances in the eastern theatre of the Russo-Ukrainian war. Protracted battles between Ukrainian and separatist forces frequently took place throughout the years of the Donbas conflict. Prior to the full-scale invasion by Russia in early 2022, Ukrainian forces held a number of settlements around Popasna, including the villages of Troitske and Novooleksandrivka, and the towns of Hirske, Novotoshkivske, and Zolote. Before the invasion, Popasna had a population of approximately 22,000 people.

== Battle ==
Troops of the Luhansk People's Republic (LPR) and the Russian Armed Forces began advancing towards Popasna on 18 April.

In mid-April, Russian and LPR troops launched artillery and air strikes on Ukrainian positions in the Popasna area. As clashes and shelling continued, civilians living in frontline areas fled to basements for shelter. However, by 18 April, according to the Institute for the Study of War, the Russian military was making little progress on the ground. According to pro-Russian sources, Russian-LPR forces launched more artillery and missile barrages in the region on 20 April following nighttime Ukrainian counterattacks. The same day, Chechen leader Ramzan Kadyrov claimed Hennadii Shcherbak, a "Ukrainian nationalist that collaborated with NATO instructors," was killed in Popasna.

On 21 April, Ukraine's 24th Mechanized Brigade, one of the main units defending the sector, claimed to have killed what appeared to be a 25-man unit of pro-Russian foreign mercenaries in overnight clashes in and around Popasna. Oleksiy Danilov, head of Ukraine's National Security Council, said Libyan and Syrian identification documents were purportedly recovered from the bodies of the unit. The 24th Mechanized Brigade said it had successfully repelled their assault and suggested the militants were foreign fighters of private military company Wagner Group and Russian citizens of rural origins. Danilov said Popasna remained under full Ukrainian control; however, the chairman of the Luhansk Regional Administration, Serhiy Haidai, said heavy fighting continued for the city.

On 22 April, Serhiy Haidai declared that the Russian army had failed in Popasna. At the same time, Haidai said that Russian and LPR troops controlled 80 per cent of the territory of Luhansk. However, two weeks later on 7 May, the city was reportedly captured by Russian mercenary forces from Wagner Group. The city had been ravaged by the fighting, and Chechen Kadyrovites were suspected of having participated in the last phase of the battle. Haidai confirmed Ukrainian troops had withdrawn.

On 7 May, Haidai initially said in his Telegram channel that the Russians controlled only half of the city, but later admitted Ukrainian forces had withdrawn from Popasna. Western assessments considered Popasna to be fully under Russian control. According to the pro-Russian Telegram channel RIA FAN, Russian and LPR forces began setting up a new Russian-backed government in the city and continued to advance westward as part of the larger offensive.

== Aftermath ==
In August, a video and photos of the head and hands of a Ukrainian prisoner of war stuck on poles appeared. The video showed the mutilated body of the captured soldier and then his head stuck on a wooden pole with his hands on metal spikes on either side of it in front of the garden of a house. The footage was seemingly taken in late July, and geolocation showed it was close to the centre of Popasna; a sign on a wall of one of the photos showed "21 Nahirna Street." The video and photos were published by Haidai on his Telegram channel. Reactions to the video in social media were harsh. Mikhail Khodorkovsky, an exiled Russian businessman, described the image as an example of the "Russian world," a propaganda term used by the Russian authorities to refer to a cultural and political union of Russian speakers. Olexander Scherba, former ambassador of Ukraine to Austria, described the event as a war crime.

According to the Ukrainian authorities of the Luhansk region, as of early 2025 only 250 inhabitants remained in Popasna, with the city's population decreasing almost 80 times compared to the pre-2022 period. The city's water supply and heating systems were destroyed during the battle, and their restoration has been reported to be deemed unnecessary by occupying authorities.

== See also ==
- Outline of the Russo-Ukrainian War
- Battle of Bakhmut
