= Sievierodonetsk urban hromada =

Sievierodonetsk urban hromada Сєвєродонецька міська громада
- Hromada
- Interactive map of Sievierodonetsk urban hromada
- Country: Ukraine
- Oblast: Luhansk Oblast
- Raion: Sievierodonetsk Raion

Area
  - Total: 712.8 km^{2} (275.2 sq mi)

Population (2020)
  - Total: 115,641
  - Density: 162.2/km^{2} (420.2/sq mi)
- Settlements: 20
- Cities: 1
- Rural settlements: 2
- Villages: 13
- Towns: 4

Sievierodonetsk urban hromada (Ukrainian: Сєвєродонецька міська громада) is a hromada of Ukraine, located in Sievierodonetsk Raion, Luhansk Oblast. Its administrative center is the city Sievierodonetsk.

It has an area of 712.8 square kilometres (275.2 mi^{2}) and a population of 115,641, as of 2020.

The hromada contains 20 settlements: 1 city (Sievierodonetsk), 6 rural settlements (Borivske, Voronove, Lisna Dacha, Metolchyne, Pavlohrad, and Syrotyne), and 13 villages:

- Bobrove
- Borovenky
- Chabanivka
- Havrylivka
- Huziivka
- Nyzhnii Sukhodil
- Oleksandrivka
- Oskolonivka
- Purdivka
- Synetskyi
- Smolianynove
- Voievodivka
- Yepyfanivka

== See also ==
- List of hromadas of Ukraine
