= Popasna =

City in Luhansk Oblast, Ukraine

Popasna Попасна (Ukrainian)
- City
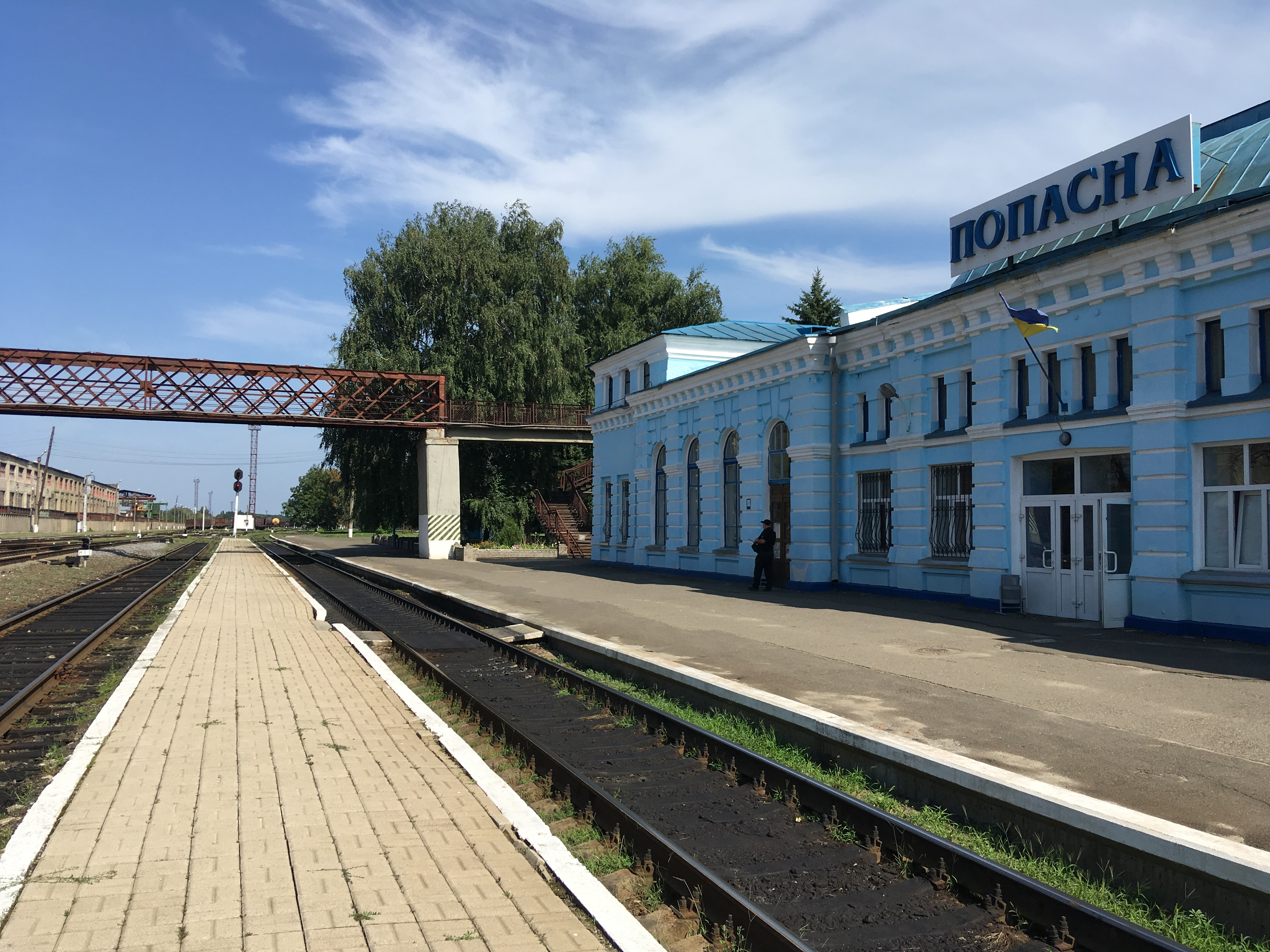
- Popasna railway station in 2019

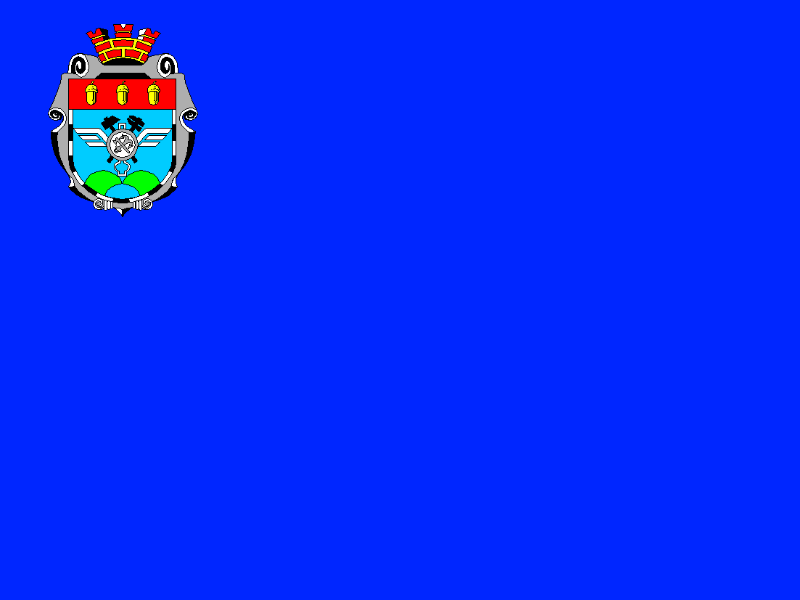
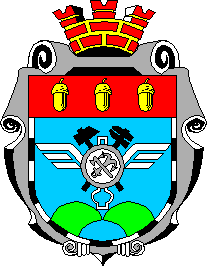
- Flag Coat of arms
- Interactive map of Popasna
- Location within Luhansk Oblast Location within Ukraine
- Coordinates: 48°38′00″N 38°22′48″E
- Country: Ukraine
- Oblast: Luhansk Oblast
- Raion: Sievierodonetsk Raion
- Hromada: Popasna urban hromada
- Founded: 1878
- City status: 1938
- Population (2023): ~200

Popasna (Ukrainian: Попасна, IPA: [pɔˈpasnɐ]; Russian: Попасная, romanized: Popasnaya) is a city in Sievierodonetsk Raion, Luhansk Oblast, Ukraine. It is the administrative center of Popasna urban hromada, one of the hromadas of Ukraine. In 2018, it was estimated that it had a population of 20,600 people.

During the Russo-Ukrainian war in 2022, the city was largely destroyed as a result of fighting between Ukrainian and Russian forces. Since the end of the battle on 8 May 2022, it has been occupied by Russia.

== History ==
=== Founding ===
Popasna was founded in the late 1870s as a stop on the newly constructed railway connecting the Donbas with industrial centers in more northern parts of what was then the Russian Empire. Construction of the railway station itself began in 1878, and basic housing was built for the workers to live in. By 1890, Popasna was connected by rail to major trade hubs like Debaltseve, Bakhmut, and Lysychansk. Popasna itself became a rail hub, and grew. By 1903, 3,735 people lived in Popasna.

=== In the Soviet Union ===
In December 1924, Popasna became the administrative center of Popasna Raion, inside Bakhmut Okruha, Donets Governorate. In February 1932, Popasna Raion was abolished, in connection with the establishment of the oblasts of Ukraine. Popasna itself was transferred to Kadiivka Raion. At some point in the 1930s, Popasna was renamed Imeni L.M. Kahanovycha (Ukrainian: Імені Л. М. Кагановича; lit. '[settlement] named after L.M. Kaganovich'). In June 1936, the settlement became the center of Kahanovych Raion within Donetsk Oblast. On 3 June 1938, a large portion of Donetsk Oblast, including Kahanovych Raion and the settlement at its center, was split off to create Voroshilovhrad Oblast (now Luhansk Oblast). The settlement was given city status on 24 October 1938.

During World War II, in 1941–1943, the German occupiers operated a Nazi prison in the town. On 12 June 1944, Kahanovych Raion was renamed to Popasna Raion, and the settlement itself returned to the name Popasna. On 30 December 1962, the raion was abolished again, and Popasna was transferred to the newly created Lysychansk Raion. On 30 December 1977, Lysychansk Raion was renamed to Popasna Raion, and its seat was moved from Lysychansk to Popasna. A local newspaper began circulating in Popasna in March 1979.

=== 21st century ===
On 19 June 2014, during the early stages of the war in Donbas, Ukrainian forces reportedly secured Popasna from pro-Russian separatists. On 8 July 2014, separatist militants retook control of the town. On 22 July 2014, the Ukrainian Donbas Battalion took back the town from the separatists, who abandoned the town that day. Afterwards, the city came under periodic artillery shelling and rocket attacks as well as occasional ground assaults from the separatists for years. Landmines were also laid near Popasna. By March 2015, the city only had two stores with some basic products and one pharmacy and residents received food distribution through a volunteer organization. Residents also complained about having to pay for public utilities and for having been cut off from social benefits supplied by the Ukrainian government.

In early March 2022, during the full-scale Russian invasion of Ukraine, Popasna was attacked by Russian forces. In the fighting near Popasna, Russian forces reportedly damaged or destroyed every property in the town center. Governor of Luhansk Oblast, Serhiy Haidai, claimed that Russian forces were "removing [Popasna] from the map of Luhansk region". On 7 May 2022, Haidai confirmed that Ukrainian troops were forced to retreat from the city of Popasna to take up more fortified positions, adding "everything was destroyed there". Ukrainian forces announced that they had withdrawn from Popasna, allowing Russia to fully occupy the town. Russia's Chechen leader Ramzan Kadyrov stated that his troops now control most of the city. Photographic evidence supplied by the governor of Luhansk Oblast has revealed that Russian forces had beheaded and dismembered a Ukrainian soldier and displayed his body parts stuck on poles in the captured city. On 15 August 2022, it was reported that Ukrainian forces hit the regional headquarters of the Wagner Group after a pro-Kremlin reporter revealed its location at Mironovskaya 12 in a photo.

Two months after the battle of Popasna, a Reuters reporter toured the town in July and reported that the town looked entirely deserted by both humans and animals, with nearly all of its buildings either destroyed or heavily damaged. The leader of the Russian Luhansk People's Republic stated there is no point in rebuilding the city destroyed during the Russian assault. In December 2022 Russian forces were reported to have constructed multiple lines of defence to the west of Popasna to blunt any Ukrainian attacks. These defences included "Dragon's teeth", trenches, and pillboxes.

Popasna's status as an independent city was abolished in March 2023 by the Russian occupation authorities due to the extent of the destruction. They have subsequently incorporated Popasna into the administration for Pervomaisk, another Russian-occupied city in Ukraine. They also abolished their version of Popasna Raion completely.

== Demographics ==
Population history

| Year | Pop. | ±% p.a. |
|---|---|---|
| 1903 | 3,735 | — |
| 1912 | 6,000 | +5.41% |
| 1939 | 26,000 | +5.58% |
| 1968 | 30,000 | +0.49% |

| Year | Pop. | ±% p.a. |
|---|---|---|
| 2001 | 25,842 | −0.45% |
| 2018 | 20,600 | −1.32% |
| 2023 | 200 | — |

Ethnic composition according to the 2001 Ukrainian census:

Ethnic groups in Popasna
| | percent |
| Ukrainians | 77.54% |
| Russians | 21.12% |
| Belarusians | 0.42% |
| Armenians | 0.13% |
| Georgians | 0.10% |
