= Nyzhnie, Luhansk Oblast =

Urban locality in Luhansk Oblast, Ukraine

Nyzhnie Нижнє
- Rural settlement
- Interactive map of Nyzhnie
- Location of Nyzhnie within Ukraine Nyzhnie (Ukraine)
- Coordinates: 48°46′17″N 38°37′12″E
- Country: Ukraine
- Oblast: Sievierodonetsk Raion
- Founded: 1756

Area
  - Total: 9.71 km^{2} (3.75 sq mi)

Population (2022)
  - Total: 2,133
  - Density: 220/km^{2} (569/sq mi)
- Time zone: UTC+2 (EET)
  - Summer (DST): UTC+3 (EEST)
- Postal code: 93290
- Area code: +380 6455

Nyzhnie (Ukrainian: Нижнє) is a rural settlement in Sievierodonetsk Raion (district) in Luhansk Oblast of eastern Ukraine. Population: 2,133 (2022 estimate)

Until 18 July 2020, Nyzhnie was located in Popasna Raion. The raion was abolished in July 2020 as part of the administrative reform of Ukraine, which reduced the number of raions of Luhansk Oblast to eight, of which only four were controlled by the government. The area of Popasna Raion was merged into Sievierodonetsk Raion.

== Demographics ==
Native language distribution as of the Ukrainian Census of 2001:

- Ukrainian: 75.86%
- Russian: 23.88%
- Others 0.26%
