= Popasna urban hromada =

Popasna urban hromada Попаснянська міська громада
- Hromada
- Interactive map of Popasna urban hromada
- Country: Ukraine
- Oblast: Luhansk
- Raion: Sievierodonetsk

Area
  - Total: 468.6 km^{2} (180.9 sq mi)

Population (2020)
  - Total: 25,180
  - Density: 53.73/km^{2} (139.2/sq mi)
- Settlements: 13
- Cities: 1
- Rural settlements: 4
- Villages: 6
- Towns: 2

Popasna urban hromada (Ukrainian: Попаснянська міська громада) is a hromada of Ukraine, located in Sievierodonetsk Raion, Luhansk Oblast. Its administrative center is the city Popasna.

It has an area of 468.6 square kilometres (180.9 mi^{2}) and a population of 25,180, as of 2020.

The hromada contains 13 settlements: 1 city (Popasna), 2 Rural-type settlements (Vrubivka and Komyshuvakha), 6 villages:

- Vyskryva
- Viktorivka
- Novozvanivka
- Novoivanivka
- Oleksandropillia
- Troitske

And 4 rural-type settlements: Hlynokaryer, Druzhba, Mykolaivka, and Nyrkove.

== See also ==
- List of hromadas of Ukraine
