= Bilohorivka, Luhansk Oblast =

Urban-type settlement in Luhansk Oblast, Ukraine

Bilohorivka Білогорівка
- Rural settlement
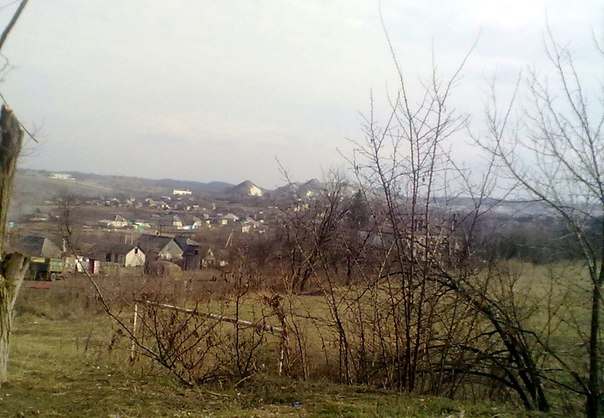
- Interactive map of Bilohorivka
- Location of Bilohorivka within Ukraine Bilohorivka (Ukraine)
- Coordinates: 48.927222°N 38.248611°E
- Country: Ukraine
- Oblast: Luhansk Oblast
- Raion: Sievierodonetsk Raion
- Hromada: Lysychansk urban hromada
- Founded: 1720
- Urban-type settlement status: 1958

Area
  - Total: 3.26 km^{2} (1.26 sq mi)
- Elevation: 86 m (282 ft)

Population (2022)
  - Total: 808
  - Density: 248/km^{2} (642/sq mi)
- Time zone: UTC+2 (EET)
  - Summer (DST): UTC+3 (EEST)
- Postal code: 93310
- Area code: +380 6474

Bilohorivka (Ukrainian: Білогорівка, IPA: [biloˈɦɔr⁽ʲ⁾iu̯kɐ]; Russian: Белогоровка, romanized: Belogorovka) is a rural settlement in Sievierodonetsk Raion, Luhansk Oblast, eastern Ukraine. It is located in Lysychansk urban hromada, one of the hromadas of Ukraine. It is located approximately 88 kilometres (55 mi) northwest from the centre of Luhansk and 25 kilometres (16 mi) west-south-west from Sievierodonetsk. In 2024 it was estimated that the village has no permanent residents left.

Prior to its capture by Russian forces in February 2025, Bilohorivka was one of the few settlements in Luhansk Oblast which was still under the control of Ukrainian forces during the Russo-Ukrainian war.

== History ==
=== Founding and early history ===
Bilohorivka was founded in 1720, making it one of the oldest settlements in the Luhansk Oblast. The founders of the village were migrants from other governorates of the Russian Empire, particularly from Belgorodsky Uyezd of Kursk Governorate. This is where the original name of the village, Belhorodka (Ukrainian: Бєлгородка), came from.

A documented sixty people in Bilohorivka (including the surrounding villages in Bilohorivka settlement council) died as a result of the Holodomor, a famine in Soviet Ukraine that lasted from 1932 to 1933.

=== Industrial development ===
Surveying work was done in 1938 to determine if there were useful mineral reserves in the area. Eventually, chalk deposits were discovered near Bilohorivka in 1946. The mining of that resource would become the basis of the village's economy, and construction of processing plants began. Starting in 1952, mining began, and the deposits became the main source of raw materials for the Lysychansk Soda Plant. In 1954, a cable car track was set up to connect the quarry and the soda plant, at a length of 16.5 kilometres (10.3 mi). Bilohorivka received urban-type settlement status in 1958.

In 2010, after the shutdown of the Lysychansk Soda Plant, work in the Bilohorivka quarry stopped. The cable car system was dismantled in 2013.

In June 2020, Bilohorivka settlement council - which was then part of Popasna Raion - was assigned to Lysychansk urban hromada. In July 2020, Bilohorivka, along with the rest of Lysychansk urban hromada, was transferred to Sievierodonetsk Raion.

=== Russo-Ukrainian war ===
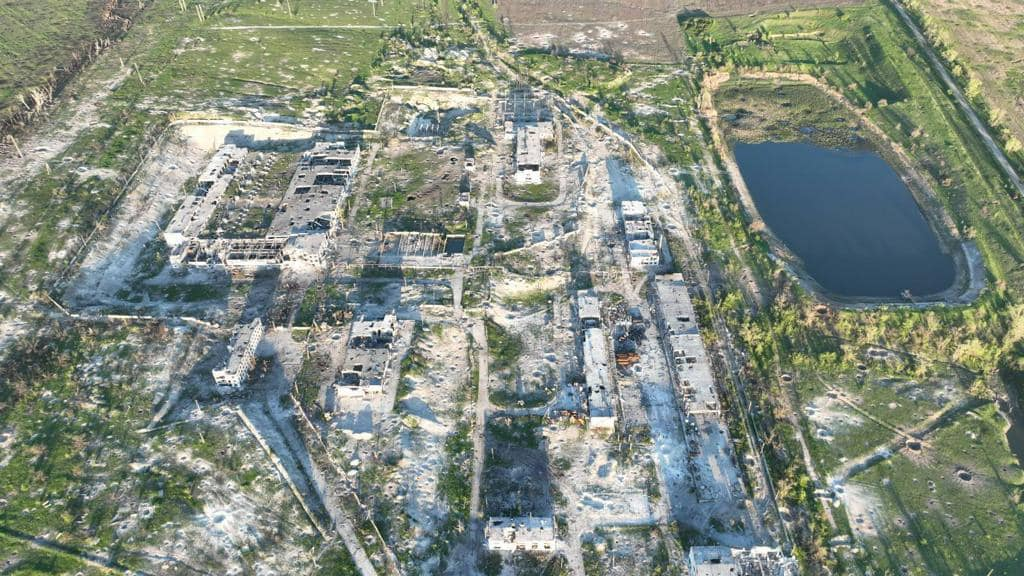
Bilohorivka ruins after the battle during Russian invasion.

According to the Governor of Luhansk Oblast Serhiy Haidai, a school in Bilohorivka was bombed by a Russian airstrike on 7 May 2022, during the Russian invasion of Ukraine, where up to 60 people died, although only 2 were confirmed. On 12 May 2022, a Russian battalion tactical group attempted to establish pontoon bridges to cross the Siverskyi Donets River. They were destroyed by Ukrainian forces, with great losses of life and equipment in the ensuing Battle of the Siverskyi Donets. At the end of the battle of Lysychansk, Russia claimed to have captured Bilohorivka along with the rest of Luhansk Oblast.

On 19 September 2022, it was confirmed that Ukrainian forces had regained full control over the settlement. On 20 September 2022, Serhii Haidai, the head of the Luhansk Regional Military Administration, said that "Bilohorivka was Ukraine’s last stronghold in Luhansk Oblast. It was the area of constant heavy fighting. Our defenders have squeezed the invaders out and are in full control of the town. However, it is still under artillery fire. The town no longer exists because the invaders razed it to the ground."

On 20 May 2024, Russian defense ministry claimed that it had taken control of the settlement as well as taken up better positions in the area; Ukraine's General Staff, in its late evening report on Facebook, said fighting was going on and around Bilohorivka.

Following continued fighting, Russian forces regained full control over Bilohorivka as well as the quarry to the south of the settlement on 23 February 2025. The Ukrainian 81st Airmobile Brigade press officer Volodymyr Holiahin claimed four days later that Bilohorivka remained under Ukrainian control.

== Economy ==
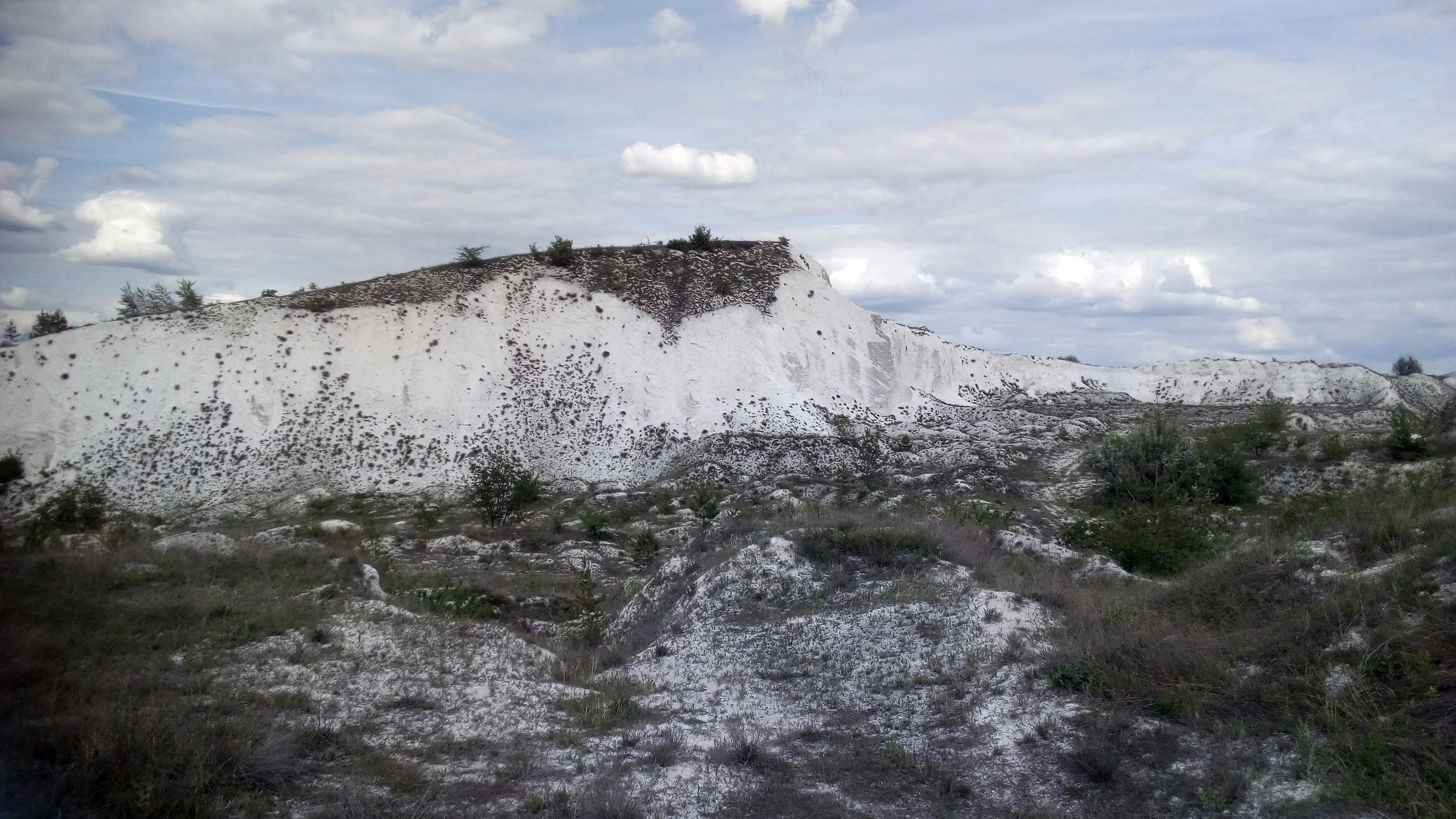
A chalk quarry in Bilohorivka

The economy of Bilohorivka has traditionally centered around the mining and processing of chalk. There are three mines. The chalk deposits of Bilohorivka are some of the largest in the industrial Donbas region.

== Education ==
As of the 1970s, Bilohorivka had a secondary school, a vocational school, and a library.

== Demographics ==
Population history

Year	Pop.	±%
1959	2,996	—
1968	1,815	−39.4%
1979	1,429	−21.3%
1989	1,347	−5.7%

Year	Pop.	±%
2001	1,186	−12.0%
2011	976	−17.7%
2022	808	−17.2%

As of the 2001 Ukrainian census, Bilohorivka had a population of 1,186 people. It is a multi-ethnic settlement— when respondents in the census were asked about their ethnic background, 61% said they were Ukrainians, and 38% said they were Russians. There were also small minorities of Belarusians, Tatars, Greeks, and Poles.

The population has declined steadily over the past decades — from 1,815 in 1968 to 808 in 2022.

== Infrastructure ==
Bilohorivka has a hospital, which had 25 beds as of the 1970s. It has bus connections to Lysychansk and Siversk.
