= Krymske, Luhansk Oblast =

Krymske Кримське
- Village
- Interactive map of Krymske
- Location of Krymske within Ukraine Krymske (Ukraine)
- Coordinates: 48°45′6″N 38°47′15″E
- Country: Ukraine
- Oblast: Luhansk Oblast
- Raion: Sievierodonetsk Raion
- Founded: 1725

Area
  - Total: 3.25 km^{2} (1.25 sq mi)
- Elevation: 58 m (190 ft)

Population (2001 census)
  - Total: 1,662
  - Density: 511/km^{2} (1,320/sq mi)
- Time zone: UTC+2 (EET)
  - Summer (DST): UTC+3 (EEST)
- Postal code: 93713
- Area code: +380 6473

Krymske (Ukrainian: Кримське; Russian: Крымское) is a village in Sievierodonetsk Raion (district) in Luhansk Oblast of eastern Ukraine, at about 50 km NW from the centre of Luhansk city.

The village is situated on the right bank of the Siverskyi Donets. It belongs to Hirske urban hromada, one of the hromadas of Ukraine.

== History ==
During the war in Donbas the village was liberated by Ukraine from separatist control on 20 October 2014. Since then the village is regularly shelled by forces loyal to the Luhansk People's Republic. Two Ukrainian servicemen were killed and another two were wounded in a skirmish between the warring parties that took place at Krymske on 28 July 2018.

Four Ukrainian servicemen were killed and six others were wounded in a 3-hour skirmish that started on 23 August 2018 at around 6:00 am. On February 18, 2020, Russian-backed separatists launched an attack near Krymske, attempting to overrun an entrenched Ukrainian position, in the first such attack in two years. The attack killed one Ukrainian soldier, and injured four others.

== Demographics ==
Native language as of the 2001 Ukrainian census:

- Ukrainian 87.48%
- Russian 12.52%
