= Bilohorivka school bombing =

War crime during the Russian invasion of Ukraine

- Part of the battle of Donbas (2022)
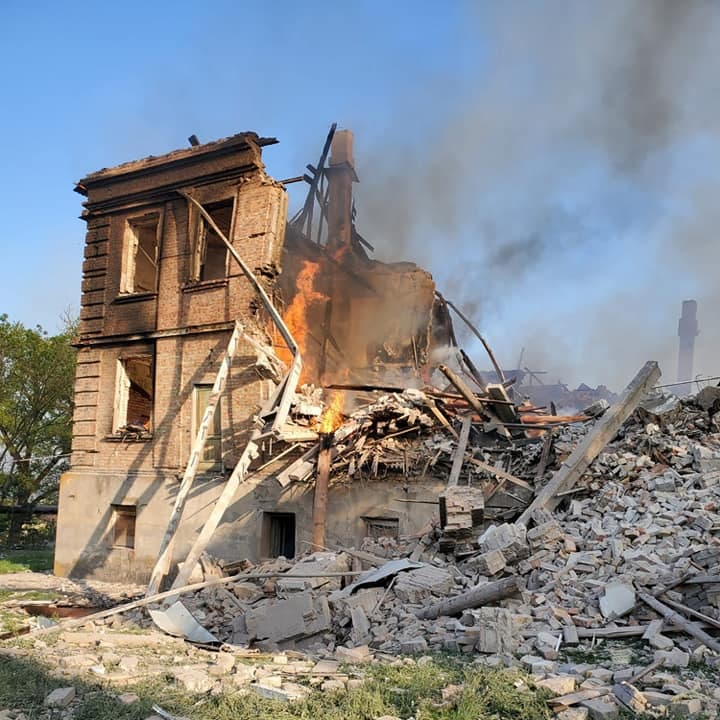
- The part of the school building after Russian shelling
- Location: 48°55′39″N 38°14′46″E; Bilohorivka, Ukraine
- Date: 7 May 2022
- Deaths: 2 (confirmed); 60 (claim)
- Perpetrator: Russia

On 7 May 2022, a school in Bilohorivka, Luhansk Oblast, was bombed by Russian forces during the Battle of Sievierodonetsk in the Russian invasion of Ukraine. The death of at least two people was confirmed while authorities said the actual death toll was close to 60.

About ninety people were sheltering inside the building's basement at the time, which President Volodymyr Zelenskyy said was the majority of the village's population at that time. The building was hit by a Russian airstrike, setting the building on fire and trapping large numbers of people inside.

== Aftermath ==
At least 30 people were rescued. Two people were confirmed to have been killed, but Governor of Luhansk Oblast Serhiy Haidai said that the 60 remaining people were believed to have been killed.

== Reactions ==
The attack was condemned by the Ukrainian Foreign Ministry, and UN secretary-general Antonio Guterres, who said he was "appalled" by the attack.

Liz Truss, the British foreign secretary, said that she was "horrified" and described the attack as constituting war crimes.
