= Rubizhne urban hromada =

Rubizhne urban hromada Рубіжанська міська громада
- Hromada
- Interactive map of Rubizhne urban hromada
- Country: Ukraine
- Oblast: Luhansk
- Raion: Sievierodonetsk

Area
  - Total: 401.5 km^{2} (155.0 sq mi)

Population (2020)
  - Total: 59,725
  - Density: 148.8/km^{2} (385.3/sq mi)
- Settlements: 14
- Cities: 1
- Villages: 13

Rubizhne urban hromada (Ukrainian: Рубіжанська міська громада) is a hromada of Ukraine, located in Sievierodonetsk Raion, Luhansk Oblast. Its administrative center is the city Rubizhne.

It has an area of 401.5 square kilometres (155.0 mi^{2}) and a population of 59,725, as of 2020.

The hromada contains 14 settlements: 1 city (Rubizhne) and 13 villages:

- Bulhakivka
- Varvarivka
- Holubivka
- Zatyshne
- Klimivka
- Krutenke
- Kudryashivka
- Mykhailivka
- Pivneve
- Skarhivka
- Prystine
- Prohres
- Shevchenko

== See also ==
- List of hromadas of Ukraine
