= Maloriazantseve =

Urban locality in Luhansk Oblast, Ukraine

Maloriazantseve Малорязанцеве
- Rural settlement
- Interactive map of Maloriazantseve
- Location of Maloriazantseve within Ukraine Maloriazantseve (Ukraine)
- Coordinates: 48°53′05″N 38°22′59″E
- Country: Ukraine
- Oblast: Luhansk Oblast
- Raion: Sievierodonetsk Raion
- Hromada: Lysychansk urban hromada
- Founded: 1938

Area
  - Total: 7.59 km^{2} (2.93 sq mi)
- Elevation: 97 m (318 ft)

Population (2022)
  - Total: 687
  - Density: 90.5/km^{2} (234/sq mi)
- Time zone: UTC+2 (EET)
  - Summer (DST): UTC+3 (EEST)
- Postal code: 93313
- Area code: +380

Maloriazantseve (Ukrainian: Малорязанцеве) is a rural settlement in Sievierodonetsk Raion (district) in Luhansk Oblast of eastern Ukraine. Population: 687 (2022 estimate)

Until 18 July 2020, Maloriazantseve was located in Popasna Raion. The raion was abolished in July 2020 as part of the administrative reform of Ukraine, which reduced the number of raions of Luhansk Oblast to eight, of which only four were controlled by the government. The area of Popasna Raion was merged into Sievierodonetsk Raion.

== Demographics ==
Native language distribution as of the Ukrainian Census of 2001:

- Ukrainian: 74.06%
- Russian: 25.74%
- other languages: 0.2%
