= Troitske, Sievierodonetsk Raion, Luhansk Oblast =

Troitske Троїцьке (Ukrainian) Троицкое (Russian)
- Village
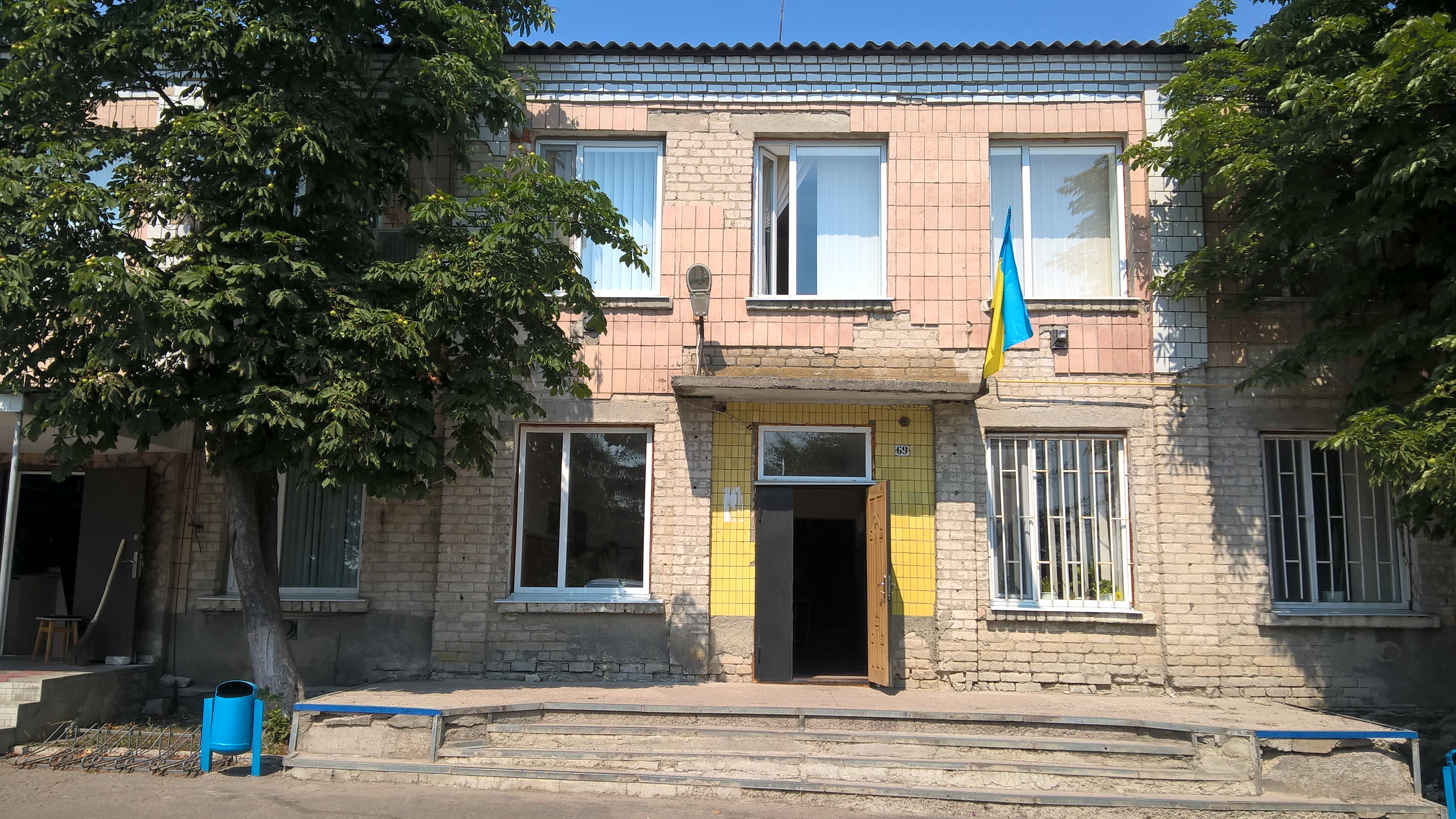
- City council of Troitske
- Interactive map of Troitske
- Location of Troitske within Ukraine Troitske (Ukraine)
- Coordinates: 48°31′26″N 38°22′33″E
- Country: Ukraine
- Oblast: Luhansk Oblast
- Raion: Sievierodonetsk Raion
- Hromada: Popasna urban hromada

Area
  - Total: 17.989 km^{2} (6.946 sq mi)
- Elevation: 135 m (443 ft)

Population (2001 census)
  - Total: 1,415
  - Density: 78.66/km^{2} (203.7/sq mi)
- Time zone: UTC+2 (EET)
  - Summer (DST): UTC+3 (EEST)
- Postal code: 93354
- Area code: +380 6474

Troitske (Ukrainian: Троїцьке; Russian: Троицкое) is a village in the Sievierodonetsk Raion (district) of Luhansk Oblast in eastern Ukraine, on the banks of Luhan River. It was in Popasna Raion until that raion was abolished on 18 July 2020 as part of the administrative reform of Ukraine.

== History ==
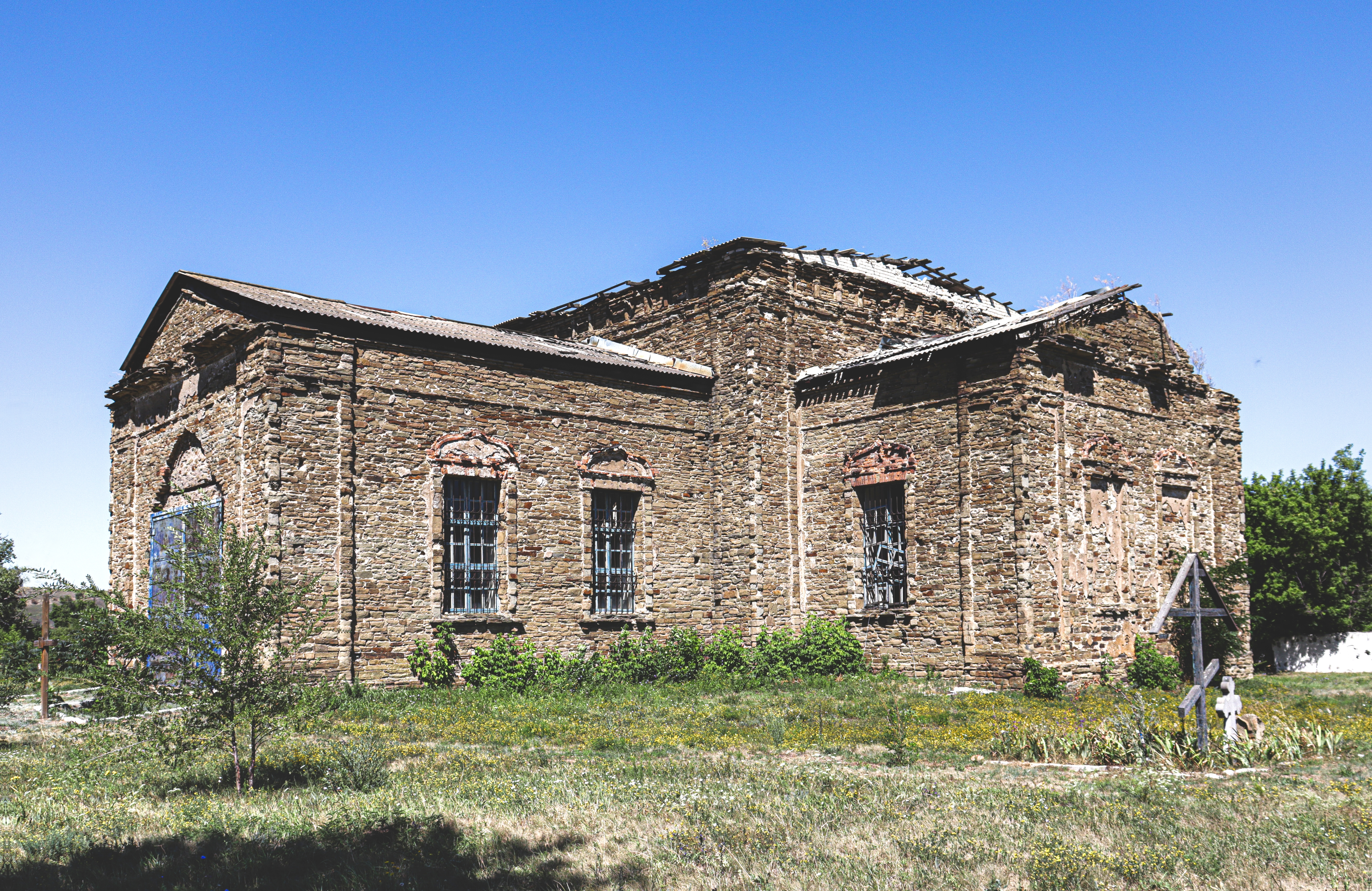
An old church in Troitske.

During the Holodomor, the village was the site of a large number of victims, which was found by the National Museum of the Holodomor-Genocide to be 423 across five mass graves in the village. During the War in Donbas the settlement has been under attacks of pro-Russian forces on multiple occasions. On 16 January 2019 five Ukrainian servicemen from the 72nd Mechanized Brigade were wounded, and five others were injured at the village when their truck, Ural-4320, was hit by anti-tank guided missiles from Kalynove.
