= Myrna Dolyna =

Urban locality in Luhansk Oblast, Ukraine

Myrna Dolyna Мирна Долина
- Rural settlement
- Interactive map of Myrna Dolyna
- Location of Myrna Dolyna within Ukraine Myrna Dolyna (Ukraine)
- Coordinates: 48°48′36″N 38°28′36″E
- Country: Ukraine
- Oblast: Luhansk Oblast
- Raion: Sievierodonetsk Raion
- Founded: 1773

Area
  - Total: 1.26 km^{2} (0.49 sq mi)
- Elevation: 147 m (482 ft)

Population (2022)
  - Total: 267
  - Density: 212/km^{2} (549/sq mi)
- Time zone: UTC+2 (EET)
  - Summer (DST): UTC+3 (EEST)
- Postal code: 93321
- Area code: +380 6474

Myrna Dolyna (Ukrainian: Мирна Долина) is a rural settlement in Sievierodonetsk Raion (district) in Luhansk Oblast of eastern Ukraine. Population: 267 (2022 estimate)

== History ==
Until 18 July 2020, Myrna Dolyna was located in Popasna Raion. The raion was abolished in July 2020 as part of the administrative reform of Ukraine, which reduced the number of raions of Luhansk Oblast to eight, of which only four were controlled by the government. The area of Popasna Raion was merged into Sievierodonetsk Raion.

On 21 June 2022 Myrna Dolyna was captured by the Russian forces during the battle of Donbas.

== Demographics ==
Native language distribution as of the Ukrainian Census of 2001:

- Ukrainian: 83.33%
- Russian: 16.67%
