= Orikhove, Sievierodonetsk Raion, Luhansk Oblast =

Orikhove Оріхове
- Village
- Interactive map of Orikhove
- Location of Orikhove within Ukraine Orikhove (Ukraine)
- Coordinates: 48.721111°N 38.5725°E
- Country: Ukraine
- Oblast: Luhansk Oblast
- Raion: Sievierodonetsk Raion
- Founded: 1800

Area
  - Total: 2.000 km^{2} (0.772 sq mi)
- Elevation: 197 m (646 ft)

Population (2001 census)
  - Total: 621
  - Density: 311/km^{2} (804/sq mi)
- Time zone: UTC+2 (EET)
  - Summer (DST): UTC+3 (EEST)
- Postal code: 93334
- Area code: +380 6474

Orikhove (Ukrainian: Оріхове; Russian: Орехово) is a village in Sievierodonetsk Raion (district) in Luhansk Oblast of eastern Ukraine, at about 25 km WNW from the centre of Luhansk.

== History ==
The settlement was formerly in Popasna Raion.

== Demographics ==
The settlement had 621 inhabitants in 2001. Native languages spoken, according to the Ukrainian Census of 2001, are:

- Ukrainian — 88.57%
- Russian — 11.43%
