= Zolotarivka, Luhansk Oblast =

Zolotarivka Золотарівка
- Village
- Location within Luhansk Oblast Location within Ukraine
- Coordinates: 48°52′36″N 38°16′09″E
- Country: Ukraine
- Oblast: Luhansk Oblast
- Raion: Sievierodonetsk Raion
- Hromada: Lysychansk urban hromada
- Founded: 1900

Population
  - Total: 631
- Postal Code: 93312

Zolotarivka (Ukrainian: Золотарівка) is a village in eastern Ukraine, located in Sievierodonetsk Raion of Luhansk Oblast. It is close to Verkhnokamianka and the Lysychansk Oil Refinery.

== History ==
During the Holodomor in 1932–33, at least 82 villagers were confirmed to have died from starvation.

During the Russo-Ukrainian War, the village was captured by Russian forces in early July 2022, Ukrainian forces claimed to have retaken the village.

== Demographics ==
The native language distribution of the population is as follows:

Ukrainian: 80.03%

Russian: 18.38%

Others: 0.32%
