= Hirske =

City in Luhansk Oblast, Ukraine

Hirske Гірське
- City
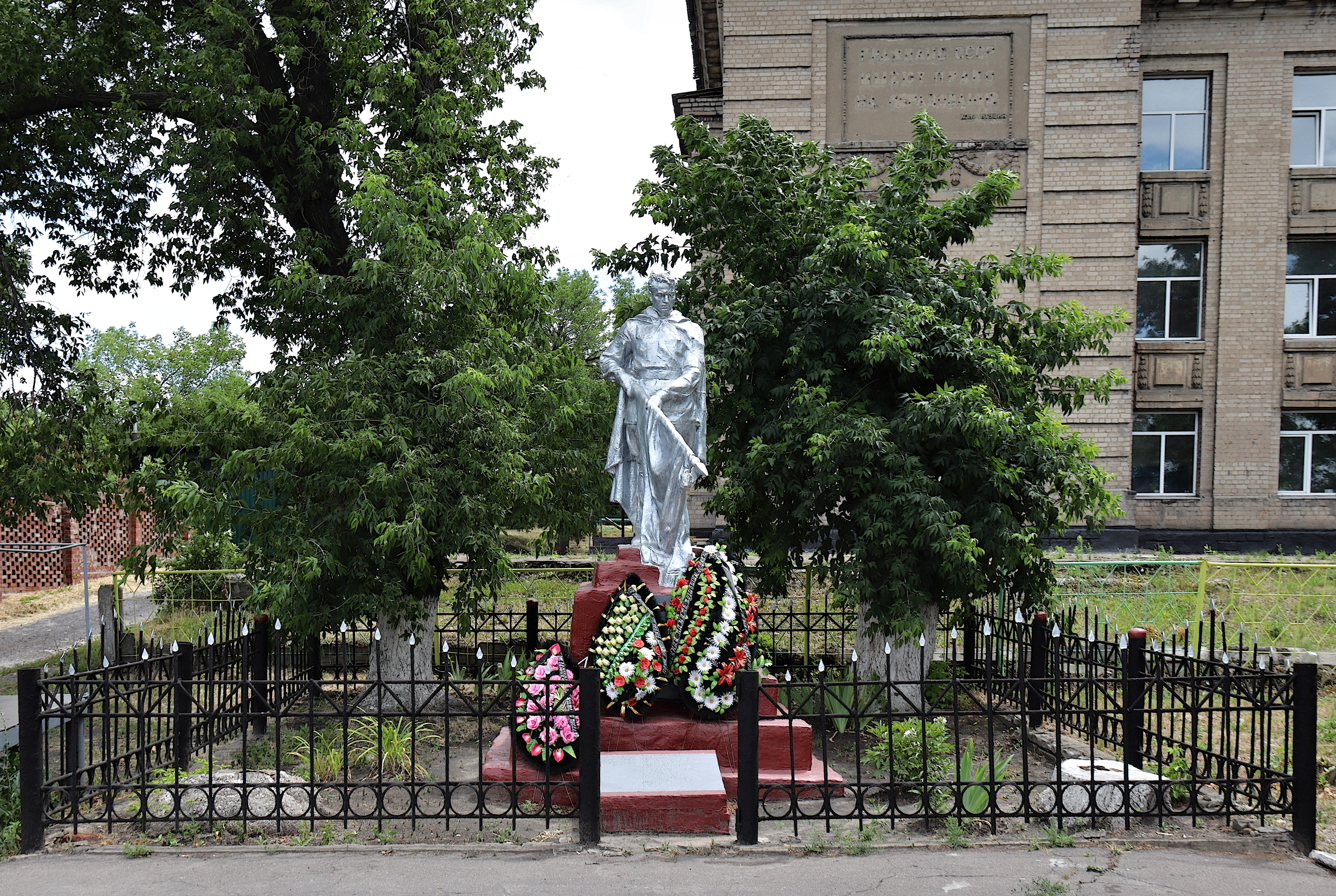
- Mass grave of Soviet soldiers in Hirske

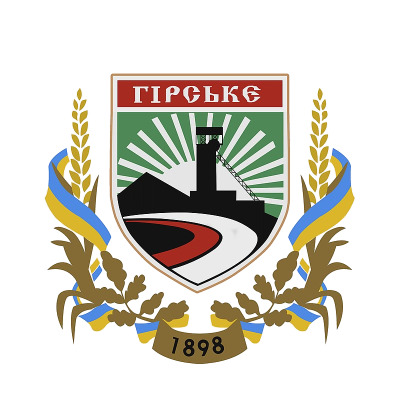
- Seal
- Interactive map of Hirske
- Location of Hirske within Ukraine Hirske (Ukraine)
- Coordinates: 48°45′7″N 38°29′42″E
- Country: Ukraine
- Oblast: Luhansk Oblast
- Raion: Sievierodonetsk Raion
- Hromada: Hirske urban hromada
- Founded: 1898
- City status: 1938

Population (2022)
  - Total: 9,100
- Time zone: UTC+2 (EET)
  - Summer (DST): UTC+3 (EEST)

Hirske (Ukrainian: Гірське, pronounced [ɦirˈsʲkɛ]; Russian: Горское, romanized: Gorskoye) is a city in Sievierodonetsk Raion, Luhansk Oblast, eastern Ukraine. It is the administrative center of Hirske urban hromada, one of the hromadas of Ukraine. Its pre-war population was 9,100 (2022 estimate).

Before 1938, it was named Hirsko-Ivanivsk (Ukrainian: Гірсько-Іванівськ). During the Russo-Ukrainian War, it has been a site of protracted violence, and was eventually captured by Russian and proxy forces during the 2022 full-scale Russian invasion of Ukraine.

== Geography ==
The city is located on the Nyzhnia Bilenka River, a right tributary of the Donets.

== History ==
=== Founding and 20th century ===
Hirske was officially founded in 1898 as Hirsko-Ivanivsk, when coal mining began in the local area. Migrant workers from across the Russian Empire settled in Hirsko-Ivanivsk, growing its population. In the Imperial Russian administrative system, it was designated as part of Slavyanoserbsk uezd (county) of Yekaterinoslav Governorate.

During the Russian Civil War, Hirsko-Ivanivsk was controlled by the communist Bolsheviks, without much fighting in the town itself. The Bolsheviks incorporated Hirsko-Ivanivsk into the Ukrainian Soviet Socialist Republic (Ukrainian SSR). However, Hirsko-Ivanivsk's important coal mine fell into disrepair, as many former mine workers went to fight. Maintenance and coal supply was needed to run the draining systems that prevented the mine tunnels from flooding with water. Eventually, the drainage pumps were shut down on 20 January 1920, and the mine was completely flooded with water. Later that year, there were attempts to use the mines again, since there was a need for coal in the Ukrainian SSR. However, the output was much lower than the pre-war levels. In autumn 1924, drainage equipment was sent to Hirsko-Ivanivsk. Eventually, the town was able to use this equipment to return the mine to operation in early August 1928.

Renovations and progress in industrial techniques increased the output of the mine throughout the 1930s. Additionally, schools were built in Hirsko-Ivanivsk, as well as grocery stores and other business that helped the diversification of industry. In 1938, it received city status, as well as its current name, Hirske.

During World War II, Hirske was occupied by Nazi Germany between 17 November 1941 and 3 September 1943. Hirske's coal mine was destroyed and rendered inoperable again during the war. After the liberation of Hirske, young people were brought in from other parts of the Ukrainian SSR to help revive its economy. Eventually in 1949, the mine was made operational again.

In 1962, Hirske was made part of Pervomaisk Municipality inside Luhansk Oblast.

=== 21st century ===
Starting in mid-April 2014, pro-Russian separatists accompanied by Russian special forces, took over several cities in Luhansk Oblast and Donetsk Oblast – including Hirske – thus beginning the war in Donbas. On 13 August 2014, Ukrainian forces secured the city from the pro-Russian separatists. On 7 October 2014, to facilitate the governance of Luhansk Oblast, the Verkhovna Rada made some changes in the administrative divisions of Luhansk Oblast and Donetsk Oblast, so that the localities in the government-controlled areas were grouped into districts. Among other changes, Hirske was transferred from Pervomaisk Municipality to Popasna Raion.

During the summer 2022 Battle of Donbas of the full-scale Russian invasion of Ukraine, Russian forces, accompanied by proxy Luhansk People's Republic (LPR) militants, advanced on and heavily shelled Hirske along with the other remaining Ukraine-held localities in Luhansk Oblast. Ukrainian authorities accused the Russians of "gradually destroying" Hirske and Popasna. Hirske was fully captured by Russian and LPR forces on 23 June 2022.

== Demographics ==
As of the 2001 Ukrainian census, Hirske had a population of 11,473 people. In terms of self-reported ethnic background, the people of Hirske were 67.8% Ukrainians and 25.0% Russians. When asked about their native languages, 53.2% reported Ukrainian, 41.6% reported Russian, 0.5% reported Belarusian, and 0.1% reported Moldovan (an alternative name for the Romanian language).

Ethnic groups in Hirske
	percent
Ukrainians	67.81%
Russians	25.03%
Belarusians	1.51%
Tatars	1.18%
Moldovans	0.15%
others	4.32%

First languages in Hirske
	percent
Ukrainian	53.2%
Russian	41.6%
Belarusian	0.5%
Romanian	0.1%
others	0.7%
