= Lozove, Starobilsk Raion, Luhansk Oblast =

Lozove Лозове
- Village
- Location of Lozove within Ukraine Lozove (Ukraine)
- Coordinates: 49.354722°N 39.283611°E
- Country: Ukraine
- Oblast: Luhansk Oblast
- Raion: Starobilsk Raion
- Founded: 1924

Area
  - Total: 0.44 km^{2} (0.17 sq mi)
- Elevation: 169 m (554 ft)

Population (2001 census)
  - Total: 59
  - Density: 130/km^{2} (350/sq mi)
- Time zone: UTC+2 (EET)
  - Summer (DST): UTC+3 (EEST)
- Postal code: 92733
- Area code: +380 6461

Lozove (Ukrainian: Лозове; Russian: Лозовое) is a village in Starobilsk Raion (district) in Luhansk Oblast of eastern Ukraine, at about 89 km NNW from the centre of Luhansk city.

== Demographics ==
In 2001 the settlement had 59 inhabitants. Native language distribution as of the Ukrainian Census of 2001:

- Ukrainian: 93.22%
- Russian: 6.78%
