= Kadiivka Raion =

Former region in Soviet Ukraine

Kadiivka Raion (Ukrainian: Кадіївський район) was a short-lived raion of the Ukrainian Soviet Socialist Republic from 1928 to 1932. Its center was Kadiivka.

== History ==
Kadiivka Raion was formed in January 1928. In February 1932, when the original Popasna Raion was abolished, some of its territory was transferred to Kadiivka Raion. In the same law, while most raions became subordinated to one of the newly created oblasts of Ukraine, Kadiivka Raion, along with the sixteen other administrative units in the Donbas historical region, was given a special status. In April 1932, Kadiivka Raion - along with five other raions in the Donbas - was abolished, due to the "great industrial importance and development prospects" of the areas. The territory of the abolished raion was annexed to the expanded Kadiivka Municipality, which was subordinated to the center.

== Economy ==
There were thirty coal mines in Kadiivka Raion.

== See also ==
- Kadiivka urban hromada
