= Lysychanskyi =

Settlement in Luhansk Oblast, Ukraine

Lysychanskyi Лисичанський
- settlement
- Location of Lysychanskyi within Luhansk Oblast#Location of Lysychanskyi within Ukraine Lysychanskyi (Ukraine)
- Coordinates: 48°54′42″N 38°21′51″E
- Country: Ukraine
- Oblast: Luhansk Oblast
- District: Sievierodonetsk Raion
- Founded: 1700
- Elevation: 92 m (302 ft)

Population (2001)
  - Total: 714
- Time zone: UTC+2 (EET)
  - Summer (DST): UTC+3 (EEST)
- Postal code: 93314
- Area code: +380 274

Lysychanskyi (Ukrainian: Лисичанський) is a settlement in Sievierodonetsk Raion (district) in Luhansk Oblast of eastern Ukraine.

Until 18 July 2020, Lysychanskyi was located in Popasna Raion. The municipality was abolished that day as part of the administrative reform of Ukraine and the number of raions of Luhansk Oblast was reduced to eight, of which only four were controlled by the government. Popasna Raion was merged into Sievierodonetsk Raion.
