= Zatyshne, Luhansk Oblast =

Zatyshne Затишне
- Village
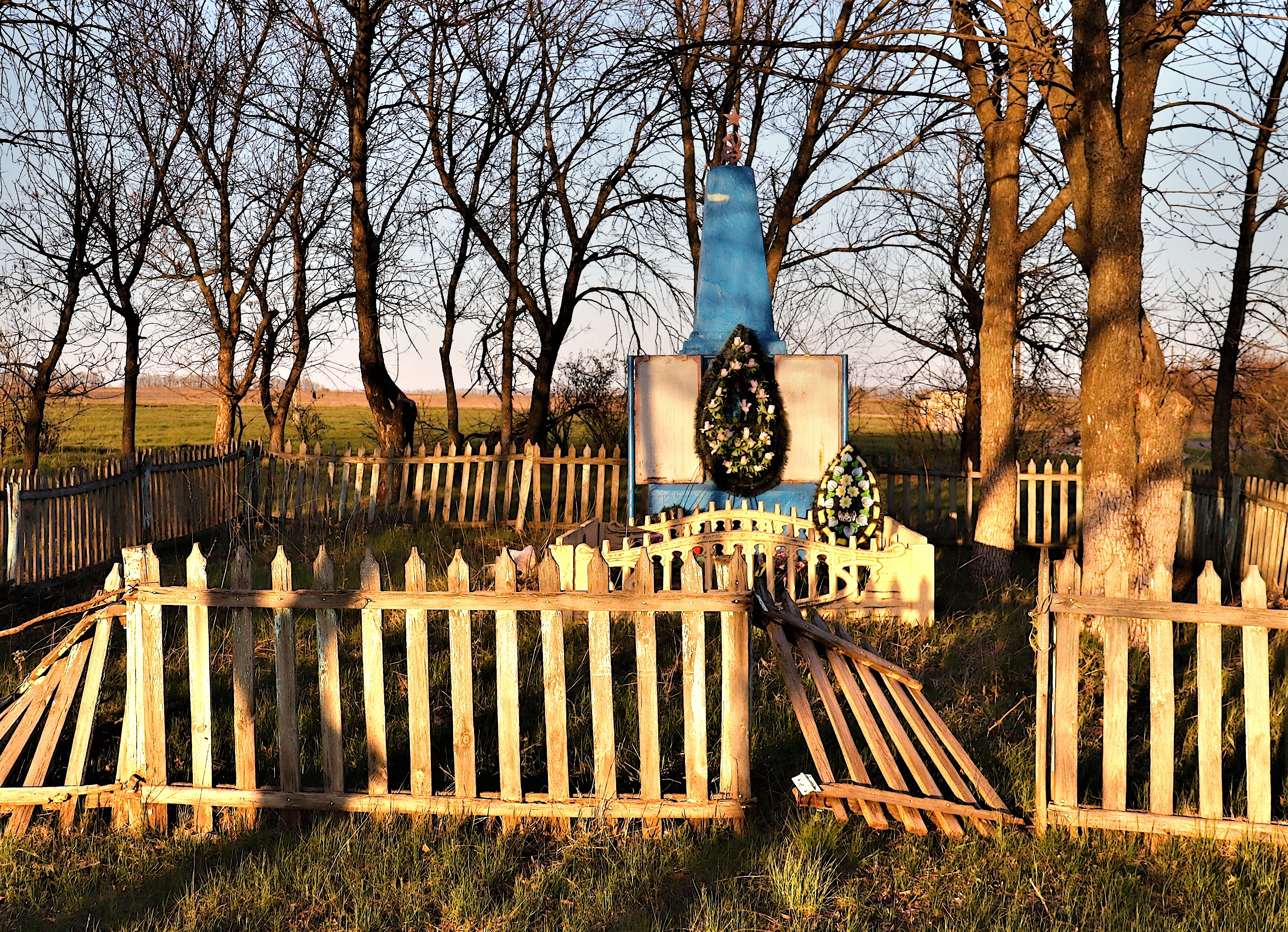

- Location of Zatyshne Zatyshne (Ukraine)
- Coordinates: 49°07′16″N 38°23′40″E
- Country: Ukraine
- Oblast: Luhansk Oblast
- Raion: Sievierodonetsk Raion
- Founded: 1960

Area
  - Total: 2 km^{2} (0.77 sq mi)
- Elevation: 134 m (440 ft)

Population (2001 census)
  - Total: 97
  - Density: 49/km^{2} (130/sq mi)
- Time zone: UTC+2 (EET)
  - Summer (DST): UTC+3 (EEST)
- Postal code: 92934
- Area code: +380 6454

Zatyshne (Ukrainian: Затишне, pronounced [zɐˈtɪʃne]) is a village in Sievierodonetsk (district) in Luhansk Oblast of eastern Ukraine.

Zatyshne was previously located in Kreminna Raion until it was abolished on 18 July 2020 as part of the administrative reform of Ukraine, which reduced the number of raions of Luhansk Oblast to eight, of which only four were controlled by the government. The area of Kreminna Raion was merged into Sievierodonetsk Raion.
