= Komyshuvakha, Sievierodonetsk Raion, Luhansk Oblast =

Urban locality in Luhansk Oblast, Ukraine

Komyshuvakha Комишуваха
- Rural settlement
- Interactive map of Komyshuvakha
- Location of Komyshuvakha within Ukraine Komyshuvakha (Ukraine)
- Coordinates: 48°41′47″N 38°26′33″E
- Country: Ukraine
- Oblast: Luhansk Oblast
- District: Sievierodonetsk Raion
- Founded: 1853

Area
  - Total: 4.88 km^{2} (1.88 sq mi)
- Elevation: 139 m (456 ft)

Population (2022)
  - Total: 1,958
  - Density: 401/km^{2} (1,040/sq mi)
- Time zone: UTC+2 (EET)
  - Summer (DST): UTC+3 (EEST)
- Postal code: 93342
- Area code: +380 6474

Komyshuvakha (Ukrainian: Комишуваха) is a rural settlement in Sievierodonetsk Raion (district) in Luhansk Oblast of eastern Ukraine. Population: 1,958 (2022 estimate)

Until 18 July 2020, Komyshuvakha was located in Popasna Raion. The raion was abolished in July 2020 as part of the administrative reform of Ukraine, which reduced the number of raions of Luhansk Oblast to eight, of which only four were controlled by the government. The area of Popasna Raion was merged into Sievierodonetsk Raion.

According to a statement by Ramzan Kadyrov, Chechen Republic forces were present in the settlement as of 15 June 2022 during the Russian invasion of Ukraine."

== Demographics ==
Native language distribution as of the Ukrainian Census of 2001:

- Ukrainian: 83.16%
- Russian: 16.74%
- Others 0.1%

== Economy ==
An important railway junction and an alabaster factory are located in the settlement.
