= Voronove, Luhansk Oblast =

Voronove Воронове
- Rural settlement
- Interactive map of Voronove
- Location of Voronove within Sievierodonetsk Raion Location of Voronove within Ukraine
- Coordinates: 48.898611°N 38.573056°E
- Country: Ukraine
- Oblast: Luhansk Oblast
- Raion: Sievierodonetsk Raion
- Founded: 1692

Area
  - Total: 1.97 km^{2} (0.76 sq mi)
- Elevation: 81 m (266 ft)

Population (2022)
  - Total: 782
  - Density: 397/km^{2} (1,030/sq mi)
- Time zone: UTC+2 (EET)
  - Summer (DST): UTC+3 (EEST)
- Postal code: 93492
- Area code: +380 6452

Voronove (Ukrainian: Воронове; Russian: Вороново) is a rural settlement in Sievierodonetsk Raion of Luhansk Oblast in eastern Ukraine, at about 10 kilometres (6.2 mi) SSE from the centre of Sievierodonetsk city and at about 64 kilometres (40 mi) NW from the centre of Luhansk city. Population: 782 (2022 estimate)

The settlement came under attack of Russian forces during the Russian invasion of Ukraine in 2022. Since June 25, 2022, the settlement is occupied by Russian regular forces and Russian proxy forces.
