= Pryvillia =

City in Luhansk Oblast, Ukraine

Pryvillia Привілля
- City
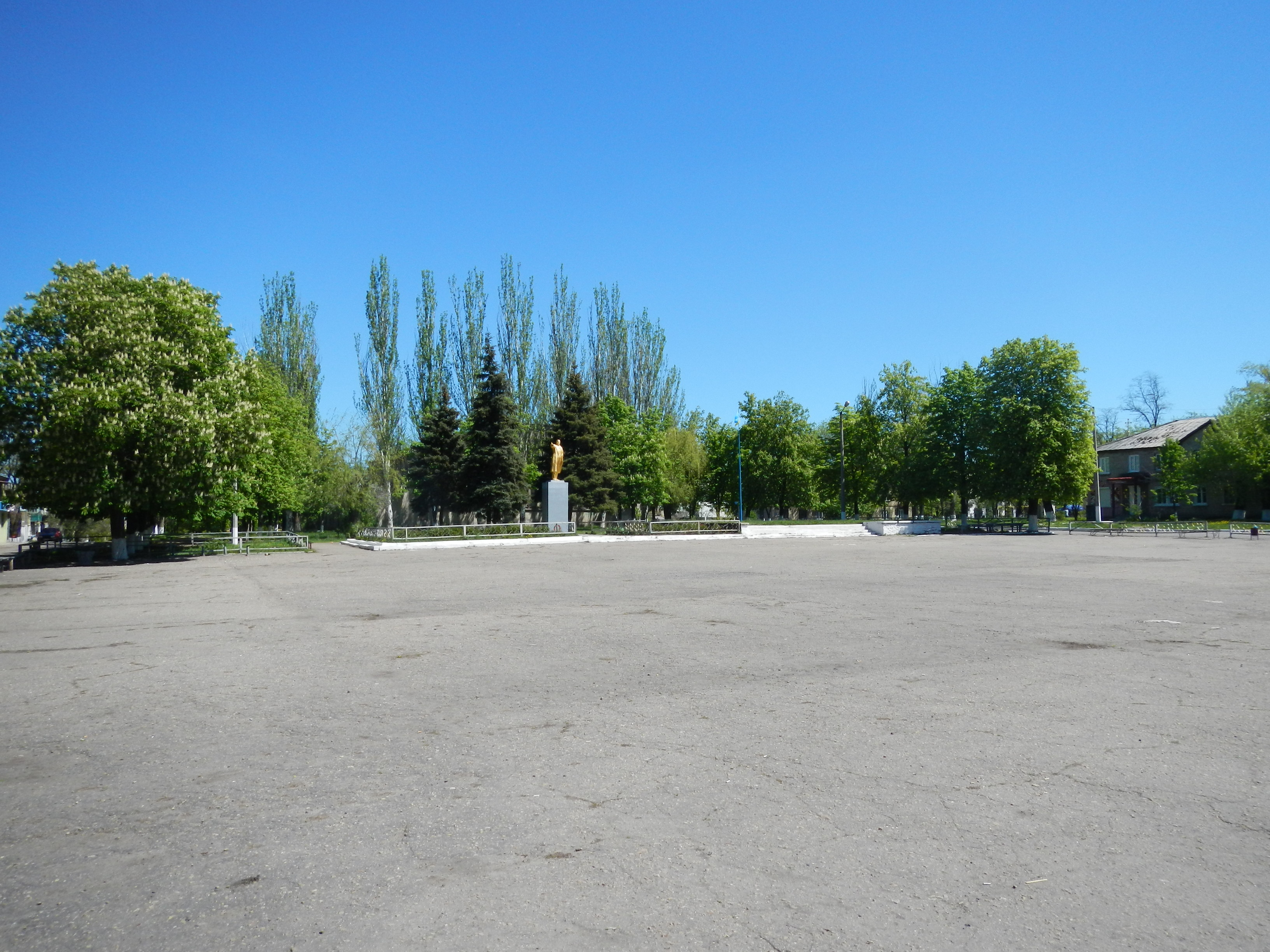
- Main square

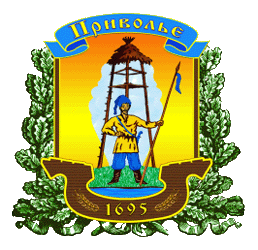
- Coat of arms
- Interactive map of Pryvillia
- Location within Ukraine Location within Luhansk Oblast
- Country: Ukraine
- Oblast: Luhansk Oblast
- Raion: Sievierodonetsk Raion
- Hromada: Lysychansk urban hromada
- Founded: 1695

Population (2022)
  - Total: 6,520
- Area code: (+380)
- Vehicle registration: BB / 13
- Climate: Dfb

Pryvillia (Ukrainian: Привілля, IPA: [preˈʋʲilʲːɐ]; Russian: Приволье) is a city in Lysychansk urban hromada, Luhansk Oblast (region) of Ukraine. Population: 6,520 (2022 estimate).

== Geography ==
Pryvillia is situated on steep slopes along the right bank of the Siverskyi Donets River.

== History ==
On 7 May 2022, Russian forces shelled the city during the 2022 Russian invasion of Ukraine. Two teenage boys, aged 11 and 14 respectively, were killed. Russian forces crossed the Siverskyi Donets river and captured the city sometime between 28 June and 1 July.

In the beginning of August, the Bellingcat group reported that the earlier published videos of mutilation and subsequent murder of an unidentified Ukrainian soldier by Russian paramilitaries were geolocated to the Pryvillia Sanatorium, located in Pryvillia.

== Demographics ==
Ethnic groups according to the 2001 Ukrainian census:

Ethnic groups in Pryvillia
	percent
Ukrainians	71.05%
Russians	26.09%
Belarusians	1.48%
Tatars	0.28%
Moldovans	0.19%
Poles	0.14%
Armenians	0.12%

Native language as of the Ukrainian Census of 2001:

Native Languages in Pryvillia
	percent
Ukrainian	50.7%
Russian	48.7%
Belarusian	0.2%
Armenian	0.1%
others	0.2%
