= Synetskyi =

Synetskyi Синецький
- Rural settlement
- Interactive map of Synetskyi
- Location of Synetskyi within Ukraine Synetskyi (Ukraine)
- Coordinates: 48.947778°N 38.411944°E
- Country: Ukraine
- Oblast: Luhansk Oblast
- Raion: Sievierodonetsk Raion
- Hromada: Sievierodonetsk urban hromada

Area
  - Total: 0.34 km^{2} (0.13 sq mi)
- Elevation: 166 m (545 ft)

Population (2001 census)
  - Total: 239
  - Density: 700/km^{2} (1,800/sq mi)
- Time zone: UTC+2 (EET)
  - Summer (DST): UTC+3 (EEST)
- Postal code: 93480
- Area code: +380 6452
- KATOTTH: UA44120110200077066

Synetskyi (Ukrainian: Синецький; Russian: Синецкий, romanized: Sinetsky) is a rural settlement (posyolok) in Sievierodonetsk Raion of Luhansk Oblast of eastern Ukraine, at about 110 kilometres (68 mi) NW from the centre of Luhansk city, on the left bank of the Siverskyi Donets river. It belongs to Sievierodonetsk urban hromada, one of the hromadas of Ukraine.

The settlement was shelled by Russian forces attacking Sievierodonetsk from the west in May 2022, during the Russian invasion of Ukraine.

== Demographics ==
As of the 2001 Ukrainian census, the settlement had 239 inhabitants, whose native languages were 14.81% Ukrainian, 84.36% Russian and 0.41% Belarusian.
