= Sokilnyky, Luhansk Oblast =

Sokilnyky Сокільники
- Village
- Interactive map of Sokilnyky
- Location of Sokilnykywithin Ukraine Sokilnyky (Ukraine)
- Coordinates: 48.746111°N 38.868611°E
- Country: Ukraine
- Oblast: Luhansk Oblast
- Raion: Sievierodonetsk Raion
- Founded: 1764

Area
  - Total: 2.76 km^{2} (1.07 sq mi)
- Elevation: 73 m (240 ft)

Population (2001 census)
  - Total: 373
  - Density: 135/km^{2} (350/sq mi)
- Time zone: UTC+2 (EET)
  - Summer (DST): UTC+3 (EEST)
- Postal code: 93713
- Area code: +380 6473

Sokilnyky (Ukrainian: Сокільники; Russian: Сокольники) is a village in Sievierodonetsk Raion (district) in Luhansk Oblast of eastern Ukraine, at about 30.0 km NW from the centre of Luhansk city.

The settlement was taken under control of pro-Russian forces during the War in Donbass, that started in 2014.

== Demographics ==
In 2001 the settlement had 377 inhabitants. Native language distribution as of the Ukrainian Census of 2001:

- Ukrainian: 19.63%
- Russian: 80.37%
