= Katerynivka, Sievierodonetsk Raion, Luhansk Oblast =

Katerynivka Катеринівка
- Village
- Interactive map of Katerynivka
- Location of Katerynivka within Ukraine Katerynivka (Ukraine)
- Coordinates: 48.665°N 38.471667°E
- Country: Ukraine
- Oblast: Luhansk Oblast
- Raion: Sievierodonetsk Raion
- Founded: 1900

Area
  - Total: 1.789 km^{2} (0.691 sq mi)
- Elevation: 186 m (610 ft)

Population (2001 census)
  - Total: 484
  - Density: 271/km^{2} (701/sq mi)
- Time zone: UTC+2 (EET)
  - Summer (DST): UTC+3 (EEST)
- Postal code: 93344
- Area code: +380 6474

Katerynivka (Ukrainian: Катеринівка; Russian: Катериновка) is a village in Sievierodonetsk Raion of Luhansk Oblast of eastern Ukraine. The village came under control of the self-proclaimed Luhansk People's Republic in June 2022.

The War in Donbass, that started in mid-April 2014, has brought along both civilian and military casualties. In this war the village was located in a "gray zone" between Ukrainian forces and forces loyal to the Luhansk People's Republic until on 4 February 2018 the Ukrainian army took the village under its control.

== Demographics ==
In 2001 the settlement had 484 inhabitants. Native language as of the Ukrainian Census of 2001:

- Ukrainian — 74.36%
- Russian — 25.84%
