= Verkhnokamianka =

Verkhnokamianka Верхньокам'янка
- Village
- Location within Luhansk Oblast Location within Ukraine
- Coordinates: 48°50′56″N 38°17′35″E
- Country: Ukraine
- Oblast: Luhansk Oblast
- Raion: Sievierodonetsk Raion

Population
  - Total: 205
- Time zone: UTC+2 (EET)
  - Summer (DST): UTC+3 (EEST)
- Postal Code: 93312

Verkhnokamianka (Ukrainian: Верхньокам'янка) is a village in the Sievierodonetsk Raion of Luhansk Oblast, in eastern Ukraine, near the border with Donetsk Oblast. It is about 10 km from the outskirts of Lysychansk city. Nearby settlements are Zolotarivka and Vovchoiarivka. Most of Verkhnokamianka is occupied by the Lysychansk Oil Refinery.

The village, including the oil refinery, was captured by Russian forces during the Russo-Ukrainian War.

== Demographics ==
As of 2001, the village had a population of 205. The linguistic composition was:

Native languages in Verkhnokamianka
Languages	percent
Ukrainian	84.4%
Russian	15.6%
