= Zolote =

City in Luhansk Oblast, Ukraine

Zolote Золоте
- City
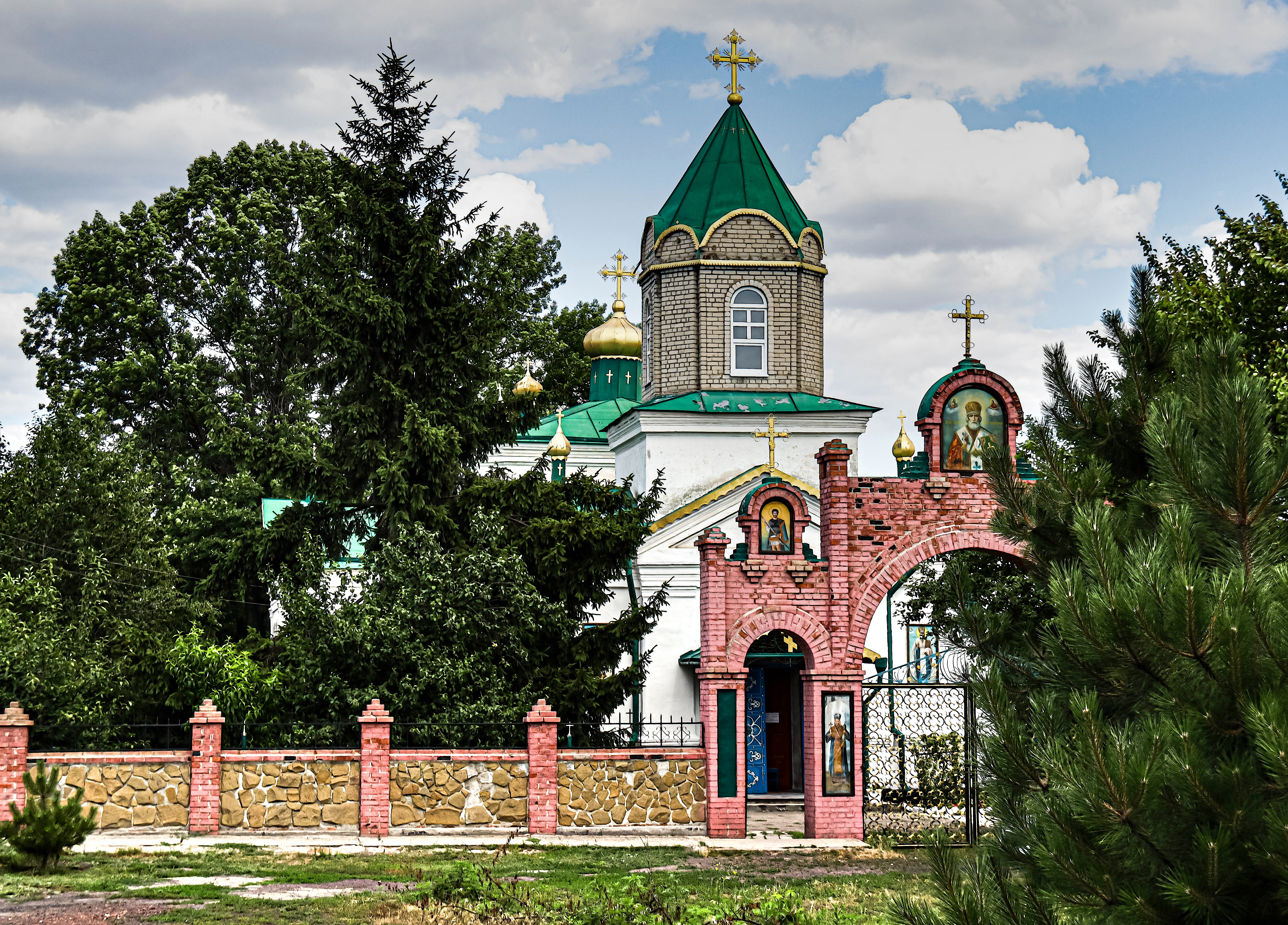
- Saint Nicholas church in Zolote

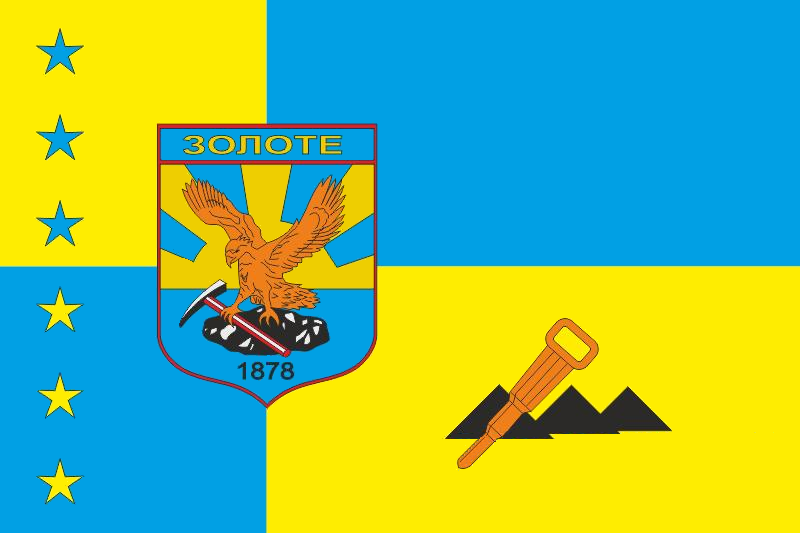
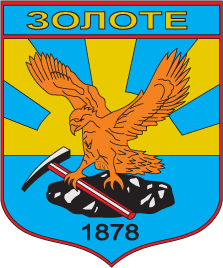
- Flag Coat of arms
- Interactive map of Zolote
- Location of Zolote within Ukraine Zolote (Luhansk Oblast)
- Coordinates: 48°41′34″N 38°31′10″E
- Country: Ukraine
- Oblast: Luhansk Oblast
- Raion: Sievierodonetsk Raion
- Hromada: Hirske urban hromada

Area
  - Total: 24.91 km^{2} (9.62 sq mi)

Population (2022)
  - Total: 13,007
  - Density: 522.2/km^{2} (1,352/sq mi)
- Time zone: UTC+2 (EET)
  - Summer (DST): UTC+3 (EEST)
- Postal code: 93294
- Area code: +380 6455
- Climate: Dfb

Zolote (Ukrainian: Золоте; Russian: Золотое, lit. 'Golden') is a city in Sievierodonetsk Raion, Luhansk Oblast, eastern Ukraine. Population: 13,007 (2022 estimate). The town consists of villages that were merged to create Zolote. Currently these villages are numbered in a sequence from Zolote 1 to Zolote 5. Before the creation of Zolote they were named Karbonit, Rodina, Stakhanovets, Maryvka and Partyzansky.

During the war in Donbas the Ukrainian authorities lost control over parts of Zolote to the self proclaimed Luhansk People's Republic (LPR). Zolote-5 (formally named Maryvka) became under full control of the LPR. Zolote-4 (Patrizansky) and Zolote-3 (Stakhanovets) became situated in the "gray zone" between the warring parties. On 30 June 2018 the Ukrainian army took full control of Zolote-4, although Ukrainian activists stated that the village takeover was staged, as according to them Ukrainian soldiers had been in the zone since 2014.

On 7 October 2014, to facilitate the governance of Luhansk Oblast, the Verkhovna Rada made some changes in the administrative divisions, so that the localities in the government-controlled areas were grouped into districts. Among other changes, Zolote was transferred from Pervomaisk Municipality to Popasna Raion.

Zolote came under the de facto control of the Luhansk People's Republic on 23 June 2022. It was claimed that around 2,000 Ukrainian troops were surrounded in the town before its capture during the battle of Donbas.

== Demographics ==
Ethnic composition and native language as of the Ukrainian Census of 2001 (this list contains Luhansk People's Republic controlled areas as well):

Ethnic groups in Zolote
| | percent |
| Ukrainians | 68.58% |
| Russians | 23.87% |
| Belarusians | 1.20% |
| Tatars | 0.60% |
| Moldovans | 0.14% |
| Poles | 0.12% |

Native Languages in Zolote
| Languages | percent |
| Russian | 50.34% |
| Ukrainian | 43.93% |
| Belarusian | 0.35% |
