= Zholobok, Luhansk Oblast =

Zholobok Жолобок
- Village
- Interactive map of Zholobok
- Location of Zholobok within Ukraine Zholobok (Ukraine)
- Coordinates: 48.712778°N 38.699444°E
- Country: Ukraine
- Oblast: Luhansk Oblast
- Raion: Sievierodonetsk Raion
- Founded: 1867

Area
  - Total: 0.15 km^{2} (0.058 sq mi)
- Elevation: 179 m (587 ft)

Population (2001 census)
  - Total: 153
  - Density: 1,000/km^{2} (2,600/sq mi)
- Time zone: UTC+2 (EET)
  - Summer (DST): UTC+3 (EEST)
- Postal code: 93890
- Area code: +380 6473

Zholobok (Ukrainian: Жолобок; Russian: Желобок) is a village in Sievierodonetsk Raion (district) in Luhansk Oblast of eastern Ukraine, at about 40.0 km WNW from the centre of Luhansk.

During the War in Donbas, on 20 January 2015 the settlement was taken under control of pro-Russian forces. After several months of clashes, on 7 June 2017 the settlement was retaken by forces of the Ukrainian 93rd Mechanized Brigade, who installed the Ukriaainian flag over one of it buildings. Three days later the LPR militants restored control over the settlement, but Ukrainian forces were able to improve their overall positions in the area.

== Demographics ==
In 2001 the settlement had 153 inhabitants. Native language as of the Ukrainian Census of 2001:

- Ukrainian — 89.54%
- Russian — 9.8%
- Other languages — 0.66%
