= Vrubivka =

Urban locality in Luhansk Oblast, Ukraine

Vrubivka Врубівка
- Rural settlement
- Interactive map of Vrubivka
- Location of Vrubivka within Sievierodonetsk Raion Location of Vrubivka within Ukraine
- Coordinates: 48.751667°N 38.375278°E
- Country: Ukraine
- Oblast: Luhansk Oblast
- Raion: Sievierodonetsk Raion
- Founded: 1948
- Elevation: 242 m (794 ft)

Population (2022)
  - Total: 866
- Time zone: UTC+2 (EET)
  - Summer (DST): UTC+3 (EEST)
- Postal code: 93330
- Area code: +380 6474

Vrubivka (Ukrainian: Врубівка; Russian: Врубовка) is a rural settlement in Sievierodonetsk Raion of Luhansk Oblast in eastern Ukraine, at about 72.0 km WNW from the centre of Luhansk city. Population: 866 (2022 estimate).

In the Russo-Ukrainian War Vrubivka is located near the frontline between the Ukrainian army and the separatist forces of the war in Donbas. On 17 February 2022 a school building in the settlement was heavily damaged by shelling. There were 53 children and 16 adults in the building when the shelling occurred but none was injured. Eleven other buildings in the town were also damaged. Locals blamed the separatist forces for the attack. The last time town had been damaged by shelling was in August 2018.

== Demographics ==
In 2001 the settlement had 1,161 inhabitants. Native language as of the Ukrainian Census of 2001:

- Ukrainian — 85.53%
- Russian — 13.95%
- other languages — 0.52%
