= Prychepylivka =

Prychepylivka Причепилівка
- Village
- Location of Prychepylivka within Ukraine Prychepylivka (Ukraine)
- Coordinates: 48.756389°N 38.691389°E
- Country: Ukraine
- Oblast: Luhansk Oblast
- Raion: Sievierodonetsk Raion
- Founded: 1962

Area
  - Total: 0.15 km^{2} (0.058 sq mi)
- Elevation: 76 m (249 ft)

Population (2001 census)
  - Total: 5
  - Density: 33/km^{2} (86/sq mi)
- Time zone: UTC+2 (EET)
  - Summer (DST): UTC+3 (EEST)
- Postal code: 93713
- Area code: +380 6473

Prychepylivka (Ukrainian: Причепилівка; Russian: Причепиловка) is a village in Sievierodonetsk Raion (district) in Luhansk Oblast of eastern Ukraine, at about 50 km NW from the centre of Luhansk city, on the right bank of the Seversky Donets river.

During the War in Donbass the Ukrainian authorities lost control over parts of Luhansk Oblast to the self proclaimed Luhansk People's Republic, but Prychepylivka stayed under Ukrainian control. It is regularly shelled by forces loyal to the Luhansk People's Republic.

== Demographics ==
The settlement had 5 inhabitants in 2001, native language distribution as of the Ukrainian Census of 2001:

- Ukrainian: 80.00%
- Russian: 20.00%
