= Shypylivka =

Village in Luhansk, Ukraine

Coordinates: 48°58′N 38°16′E

Shypylivka (Ukrainian: Шипилiвка), also known as Shipilovka (Russian: Шипиловка) is a village in Luhansk Oblast, Ukraine. The village's population is 500 (as of 2001).

Administratively, Shypylivka belongs to the Sievierodonetsk Raion (district) of the oblast as a part of the Bilohorivka local council.
