= Vovchoiarivka =

Urban locality in Luhansk Oblast, Ukraine

Vovchoiarivka Вовчоярівка
- Rural settlement
- Interactive map of Vovchoiarivka
- Location of Vovchoiarivka within Ukraine Vovchoiarivka (Ukraine)
- Coordinates: 48°49′48″N 38°21′39″E
- Country: Ukraine
- Oblast: Luhansk Oblast
- District: Sievierodonetsk Raion
- Founded: 1783

Area
  - Total: 4.03 km^{2} (1.56 sq mi)
- Elevation: 90 m (300 ft)

Population (2022)
  - Total: 735
  - Density: 182/km^{2} (472/sq mi)
- Time zone: UTC+2 (EET)
  - Summer (DST): UTC+3 (EEST)
- Postal code: 93315
- Area code: +380 6474

Vovchoiarivka (Ukrainian: Вовчоярівка) is a rural settlement in Sievierodonetsk Raion (district) in Luhansk Oblast of eastern Ukraine. Population: 735 (2022 estimate)

Until 18 July 2020, Vovchoiarivka was located in Popasna Raion. The raion was abolished in July 2020 as part of the administrative reform of Ukraine, which reduced the number of raions in Luhansk Oblast to eight, of which only four were controlled by the government. The area of Popasna Raion was merged into Sievierodonetsk Raion.

== Demographics ==
Native language distribution as of the Ukrainian Census of 2001:

- Ukrainian: 89.17%
- Russian: 10.75%
- Others 0.08%
