= Ustynivka, Sievierodonetsk Raion, Luhansk Oblast =

Ustynivka Устинівка
- Village
- Interactive map of Ustynivka
- Location of Ustynivka within Ukraine Ustynivka (Ukraine)
- Coordinates: 48.822222°N 38.562222°E
- Country: Ukraine
- Oblast: Luhansk Oblast
- Raion: Sievierodonetsk Raion
- Founded: 1785

Area
  - Total: 0.102 km^{2} (0.039 sq mi)
- Elevation: 77 m (253 ft)

Population (2001 census)
  - Total: 121
  - Density: 1,190/km^{2} (3,070/sq mi)
- Time zone: UTC+2 (EET)
  - Summer (DST): UTC+3 (EEST)
- Postal code: 93322
- Area code: +380 6474

Ustynivka (Ukrainian: Устинівка; Russian: Устиновка) is a village in Sievierodonetsk Raion (district) in Luhansk Oblast of eastern Ukraine, at about 64 kilometres (40 mi) NW from the centre of Luhansk city and at about 14 kilometres (8.7 mi) SSE from the centre of Sievierodonetsk city, on the right bank of the Siverskyi Donets river.

The village came under attack of Russian forces during the Russian invasion of Ukraine in 2022. Two villagers were killed on 25 May.
