= Voievodivka, Luhansk Oblast =

Voievodivka Воєводівка
- Village
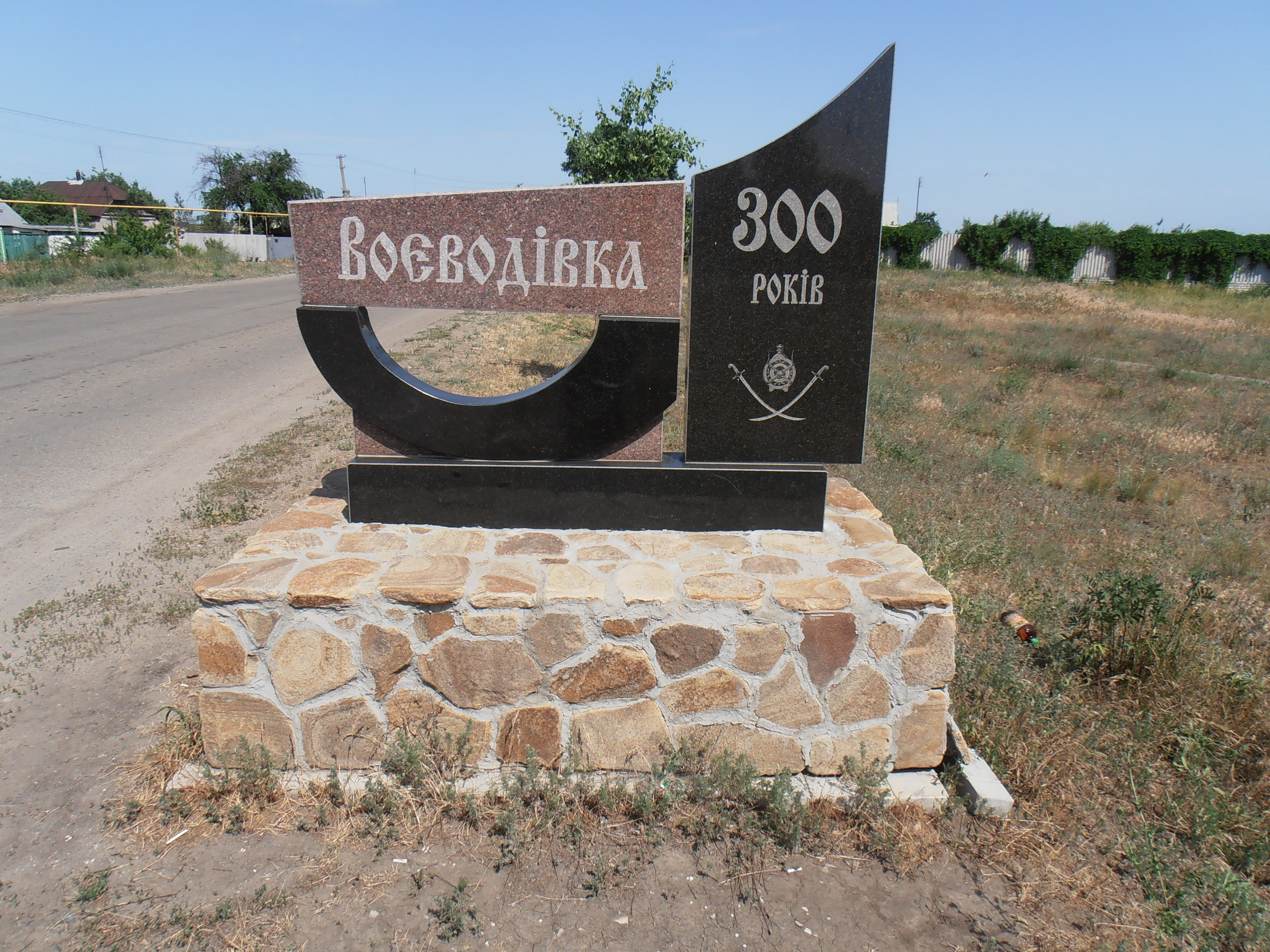
- Interactive map of Voievodivka
- Location of Voievodivka within Ukraine Voievodivka (Ukraine)
- Coordinates: 48.97829022890779°N 38.45718441128123°E
- Country: Ukraine
- Oblast: Luhansk Oblast
- Raion: Sievierodonetsk Raion
- Founded: 1707

Area
  - Total: 1.11 km^{2} (0.43 sq mi)

Population
  - Total: 594
  - Density: 535/km^{2} (1,390/sq mi)
- Time zone: UTC+2 (EET)
  - Summer (DST): UTC+3 (EEST)
- Postal code: 93481
- Area code: +380 6452

Voievodivka (Ukrainian: Воєводівка) is a village in eastern Ukraine, in Sievierodonetsk Raion of Luhansk Oblast, at about 110 km NW from the centre of Luhansk city, at the NNW border of Sievierodonetsk city and on the SE border of Rubizhne city.

Voievodivka became occupied by Russian forces during the Russian invasion of Ukraine on 11 May 2022.

== Demographics ==
As of the 2001 Ukrainian census, Voievodivka had a population of 594 inhabitants. The linguistic composition of the population was as follows:

Native languages in Voievodivka
	percent
Ukrainian	73.2%
Russian	26.8%
others	0.0%

== See also ==
- Battle of Sievierodonetsk (2022)
- Battle of Rubizhne
