= Toshkivka =

Toshkivka Тошківка
- Rural settlement
- Interactive map of Toshkivka
- Location of Toshkivka within Ukraine Toshkivka (Luhansk Oblast)
- Coordinates: 48.779722°N 38.558889°E
- Country: Ukraine
- Oblast: Luhansk Oblast
- Raion: Sievierodonetsk Raion
- Founded: 1871

Area
  - Total: 10.61 km^{2} (4.10 sq mi)

Population (2022)
  - Total: 3,787
  - Density: 356.9/km^{2} (924.4/sq mi)
- Time zone: UTC+2 (EET)
  - Summer (DST): UTC+3 (EEST)
- Postal code: 93280
- Area code: +380 6455

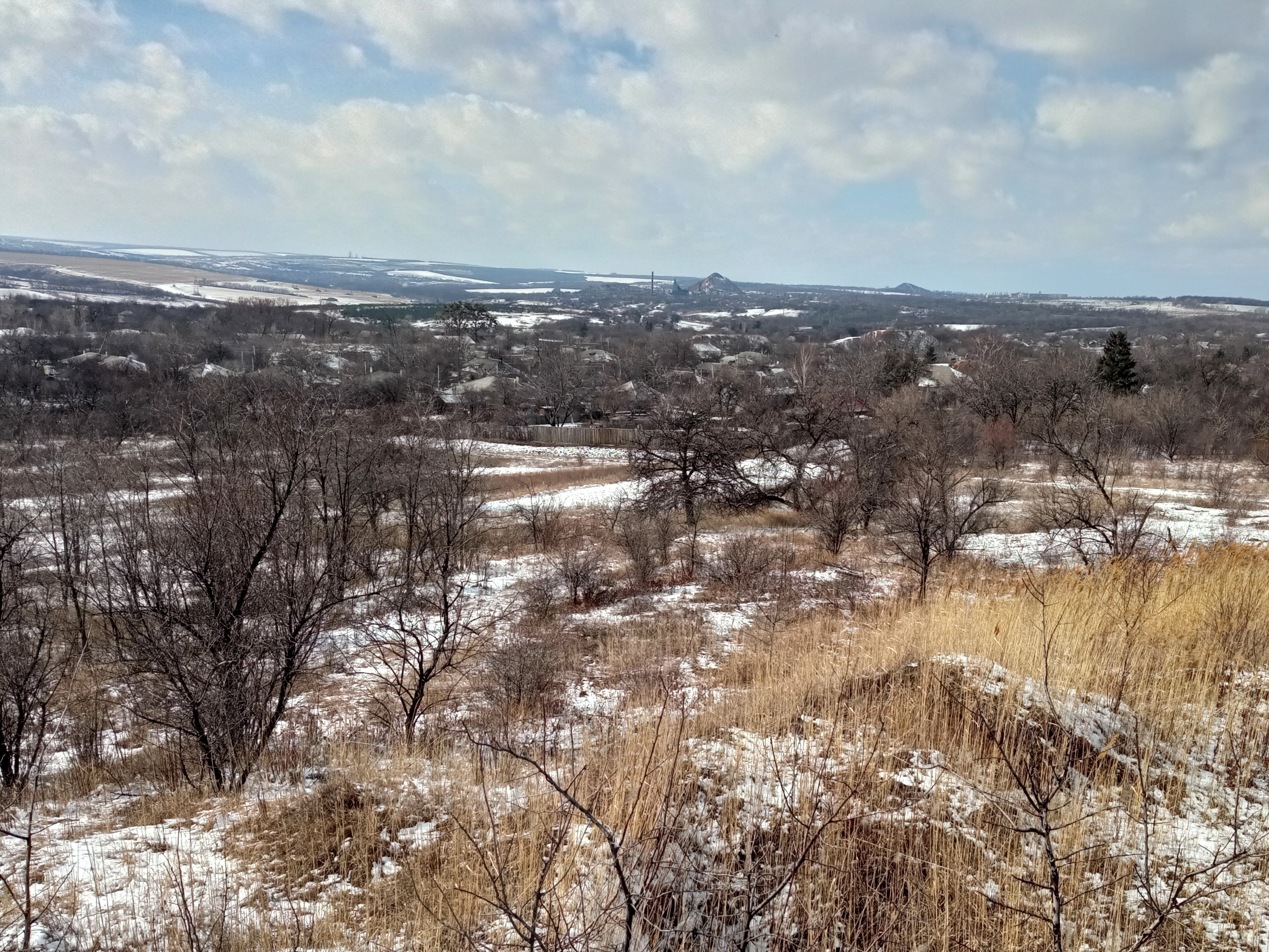

Toshkivka (Ukrainian: Тошківка; Russian: Тошковка) is a rural settlement in Sievierodonetsk Raion, Luhansk Oblast, eastern Ukraine. It is located at about 30 kilometres (19 mi) west-north-west from the centre of Luhansk. Population: 3,787 (2022 estimate). Since June 2022, it has been occupied by Russia, which claims it as part of the Luhansk People's Republic.

== History ==
On 12 June 2022, during the 2022 Russian invasion of Ukraine, Russian forces claimed to have seized control over the settlement. On 21 June 2022, Ukraine admitted that it had lost control over Toshkivka, claiming that it was only conquered on 20 June. The town has practically ceased to exist due to heavy bombing, which led to the destruction of all buildings in the settlement.

== Demographics ==
Native language distribution as of the Ukrainian Census of 2001:

- Ukrainian: 83.05%
- Russian: 16.39%
- other languages: 0.56%
