= Sievierodonetsk Raion =

Subdivision of Luhansk Oblast, Ukraine

Coordinates: 49°08′N 38°23′E

Sievierodonetsk Raion Сєвєродонецький район
- Raion
- Interactive map of Sievierodonetsk Raion
- Country: Ukraine
- Oblast: Luhansk Oblast
- Established: 2020
- Admin. center: Sievierodonetsk
- Subdivisions: 6 hromadas

Area
  - Total: 2,686 km^{2} (1,037 sq mi)

Population (2022)
  - Total: 369,539
  - Density: 137.6/km^{2} (356.3/sq mi)

Sievierodonetsk Raion (Ukrainian: Сєвєродонецький район; Russian: Северодонецкий район) or Siverskodonetsk Raion (Ukrainian: Сіверськодонецький район) is a raion (district) of Luhansk Oblast, Ukraine. It was created in July 2020 as part of the reform of administrative divisions of Ukraine. The center of the raion is the city of Sievierodonetsk. Population: 362,539 (2022 estimate).

On 19 September 2024, the Verkhovna Rada voted to rename Sievierodonetsk Raion to Siverskodonetsk Raion.

== Subdivisions ==
The raion is divided up into six hromadas:

- Hirske urban hromada;
- Kreminna urban hromada;
- Lysychansk urban hromada;
- Popasna urban hromada;
- Rubizhne urban hromada;
- Sievierodonetsk urban hromada.

== Former urban-type settlements ==
The following are the urban-type settlements.

- Bilohorivka
- Borivske
- Komyshuvakha
- Maloriazantseve
- Metiolkine
- Myrna Dolyna
- Novotoshkivske
- Nyzhnie
- Syrotyne
- Toshkivka
- Voronove
- Vovchoiarivka
- Vrubivka

== Villages ==
- Chervonopopivka
- Katerynivka
- Lysychanskyi
- Novozvanivka
- Orikhove
- Prychepylivka
- Shypylivka
- Sokilnyky
- Synetskyi
- Troitske
- Ustynivka
- Verkhnokamianka
- Voevodivka
- Zatyshne
- Zholobok
- Zolotarivka

== See also ==
- List of hromadas of Ukraine#Luhansk Oblast
- List of urban-type settlements in Ukraine
