= Popasna Raion =

Former subdivision of Luhansk Oblast, Ukraine

Popasna Raion Попаснянський район
- Raion
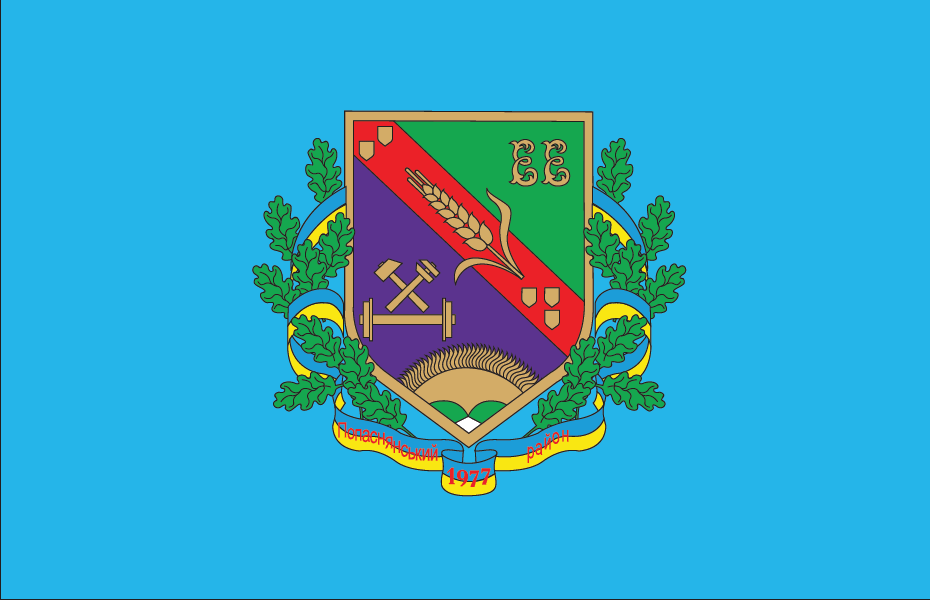
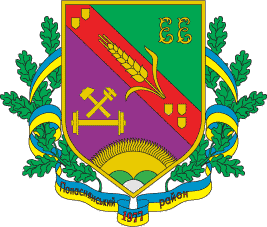
- Flag Coat of arms

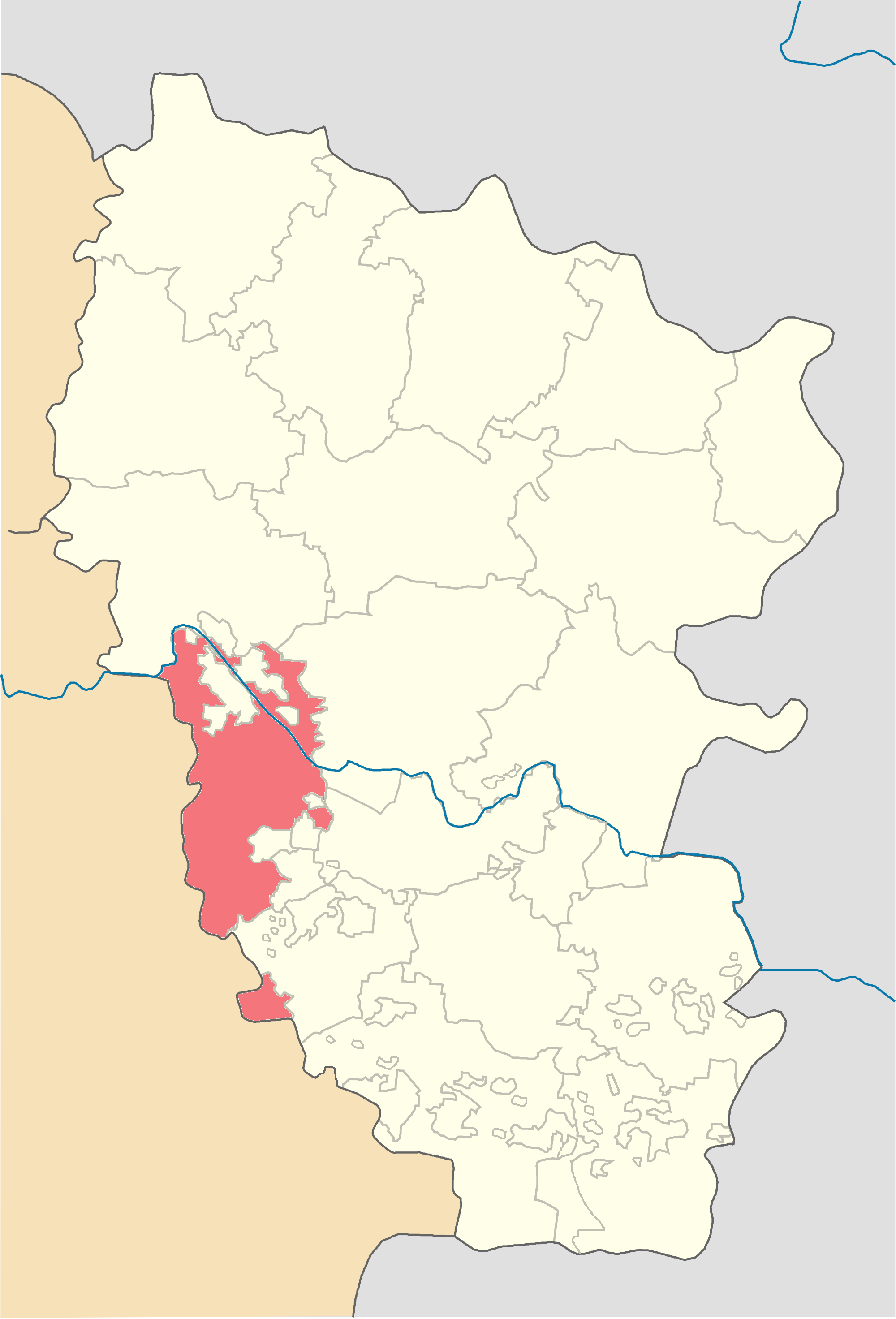
- Coordinates: 48°41′43″N 38°25′6″E
- Country: Ukraine
- Region: Luhansk Oblast
- Established: 7 March 1923
- Disestablished: 18 July 2020
- Admin. center: Popasna
- Subdivisions: List: 1 — city councils; 7 — settlement councils; 3 — rural councils; Number of localities: 1 — cities; 7 — urban-type settlements; 17 — villages; 10 — rural settlements

Area
  - Total: 1,325 km^{2} (512 sq mi)

Population (2020)
  - Total: 74,028
  - Density: 55.87/km^{2} (144.7/sq mi)
- Time zone: UTC+02:00 (EET)
  - Summer (DST): UTC+03:00 (EEST)
- Postal index: 93300—93354
- Area code: +380 6474
- Website: http://pps.loga.gov.ua

Popasna Raion (Ukrainian: Попаснянський район, romanized: Popasnianskyi raion; Russian: Попаснянский район, romanized: Popasnyanskiy rayon) was a raion (district) in Luhansk Oblast, Ukraine until its abolition in 2020. The administrative center was the town of Popasna. The last estimate of the raion population was 74,028 (2020 est.).

== History ==
=== 20th century ===
On 7 March 1923, the raion was originally created as Komyshuvakha Raion, (Note: Ukrainian: Комишевахський район) with its administrative center in Komyshuvakha. It was subordinated to Bakhmut Okruha within Donets Governorate. In December 1924, the administrative center was moved to Popasna, and the raion was renamed to Popasna Raion accordingly. On 15 September 1930, all the okruhas of the Ukrainian Soviet Socialist Republic were abolished, so Popasna Raion became directly subordinated to the Ukrainian SSR. In February 1932, Popasna Raion was abolished, in connection with the establishment of the oblasts of Ukraine. The constituent local councils of Popasna Raion were divided between Artemivsk Raion and Kadiivka Raion.

In June 1936, the raion was re-created as Kahanovych Raion (Note: Ukrainian: Кагановичський район) within Donetsk Oblast, with its center in Popasna - which, at the time, was renamed after Lazar Kaganovich. On 3 June 1938, a large portion of Donetsk Oblast, (Note: At the time, Donetsk Oblast was known as Stalino Oblast, after Joseph Stalin.) including Kahanovych Raion, was split off to create Voroshilovhrad Oblast (now Luhansk Oblast) On 12 June 1944, Kahanovych Raion was renamed to Popasna Raion.

On 30 December 1962, the raion was abolished again, and its territory transferred to Lysychansk Raion, (Note: Ukrainian: Лисичанський район, romanized: Lysychanskyi raion; Russian: Лисичанский район, romanized: Lisichanskiy rayon) which had its center in Lysychansk. On 30 December 1977, Lysychansk Raion was renamed to Popasna Raion, when its seat was moved from Lysychansk to Popasna.

=== 21st century ===
During the war in Donbas that began in 2014, the Ukrainian authorities lost control over parts of Popasna Raion to the Luhansk People's Republic (LPR), an unrecognized, Russia-backed breakaway state. On 7 October 2014, to facilitate the governance of partially-occupied Luhansk Oblast, the Verkhovna Rada made some changes in its administrative divisions, so that the localities in the government-controlled areas were grouped into districts. In particular, the urban-type settlement of Chornukhyne was transferred to Popasna Raion from Perevalsk Raion, the urban-type settlement of Novotoshkivske from Kirovsk Municipality, and the settlements Hirske, Zolote, Nyzhnie and Toshkivka from Pervomaisk Municipality. This resulted in the area of the raion increasing by 14,174 hectares. The part of Popasna Raion under control of the Luhansk People's Republic were transferred to other administrative units as well.

The Ukrainian raion was abolished for a third and final time on 18 July 2020 as part of the decentralizing administrative reform of Ukraine, which reduced the number of raions of Luhansk Oblast to eight, of which only four were controlled by the government.

The unrecognized Luhansk People's Republic continued to use Popasna Raion as a nominal administrative division for the next few years, despite not controlling Popasna. In 2022, during the battle of Popasna of the full-scale Russian invasion of Ukraine, Popasna was completely destroyed by Russia and the LPR, who began an occupation of what remained of the city. In March 2023, legal documents of the Luhansk People's Republic - which by that point had been explicitly annexed by Russia - stopped using Popasna Raion as an administrative unit, due to the extreme level of destruction of the city and its surroundings.

== Demographics ==
Population history

Year	Pop.	±%
1970	41,077	—
1979	71,867	+75.0%
1989	66,295	−7.8%

Year	Pop.	±%
2001	50,559	−23.7%
2013	40,620	−19.7%
2020	74,028	+82.2%

As of the 2001 Ukrainian census, the population of Popasna Raion was 50,559. The self-reported ethnic distribution of the raion was:

- Ukrainians: 81.1%
- Russians: 17.5%
- Belarusians: 0.5%

By 2013, the population had shrunk to 40,620. Of that number, 31,180 (76.76%) lived in urban areas, and 9,440 (23.24%) lived in rural areas.
