= Shapovalov =

Shapovalov (Russian: Шаповалов, pronounced [ʂəpɐˈvaləf]; Ukrainian: Шаповалов, pronounced [ʃɐpoˈwɑlou̯]) is a Russian and Ukrainian masculine surname originating from the word shapoval (шаповал), meaning 'maker of felt hats'. Its feminine counterpart is Shapovalova (Шаповалова). Notable people with the surname include:

- Andrii Shapovalov (born 1993), Ukrainian basketball player
- Denis Shapovalov (born 1999), Canadian tennis player
- Hennadii Shapovalov (born 1978), Ukrainian brigadier general
- Igor Shapovalov (born 1985), Russian football player
- Ivan Shapovalov (born 1966), Russian musical producer
- Lev Shapovalov (1905–1997), birth name of Lev Ovalov, Soviet writer
- Lyudmila Aksyonova-Shapovalova (born 1947), Soviet sprinter
- Oleh Shapovalov (1963–2021), Ukrainian politician
- Roman Shapovalov (born 1981), Russian football player
- Ruslan Shapovalov (born 1995), Russian football player
- Sergei Shapovalov (born 1995), Russian football player
- Tessa Shapovalova (born 1969), Israeli-Ukrainian tennis coach and former player
- Valeriy Shapovalov (born 1976), Ukrainian football player
- Viktor Shapovalov (born 1965), Russian auto racing driver
- Vyacheslav Shapovalov (born 1969), Ukrainian government official
- Yevgeny Shapovalov (1904–1977), Soviet army general
- Yevgeniya Shapovalova (born 1986), Russian cross country skier
- Yurii Shapovalov (born 1972), Ukrainian politician

== See also ==
- Shapoval
- Shapovalenko
