= History of Lysychansk =

Historical affiliations

- Golden Horde (tributary/raiding zone) ? – c. 1380s
- Grand Duchy of Lithuania c. 1380s – c. 1390s
- Disputed raiding zone
  ∟ disputed between the Polish–Lithuanian union, the Tsardom of Russia, and the Crimean Khanate, 1390s–1670s
- Tsardom of Russia 1675–1721
- Russian Empire 1721–1917
- Ukrainian War of Independence
  - Russian Provisional Government Mar–Nov 1917
  - UPRS Nov 1917 – Apr 1918
  - UPR/Ukrainian State Apr 1918 – Jan 1919
  - UkrSSR Jan–Jul 1919
  - AFSR Jul–Dec 1919
  - PWPGU/UkrSSR Dec 1919 – Dec 1922
- Soviet Union 1922–1942
- Second World War
  - Nazi Germany Jul 1942 – Feb 1943
  - Soviet Union Feb–Mar 1943
  - Nazi Germany Mar–Sep 1943
- Soviet Union 1943–1991
- Ukraine 1991–present
- ∟ occupied by the Luhansk People's Republic April–July 2014
- ∟ occupied by Russia since 2 July 2022

The history of Lysychansk starts with the human settlement of the city, which is first attested to most likely the Lower Paleolithic. In the Antiquity, the area of the city was ruled by Scythians and other steppe people. In the Medieval era, it became part of the Golden Horde, before coming briefly under the Grand Duchy of Lithuania in the 1380s. It then became a disputed raiding zone between the Polish-Lithuanian union, the Grand Principality of Moscow, and the Crimean Khanate. The Cossacks built a fortification in 1672, followed by two settlements shortly thereafter: Bovirske in 1675 and Krasnianskyi in 1675.

In 1710, a third settlement was founded called Lisya Balka, which is popularly regarded as the city's founding. In 1721, the first discovery of coal in the entire Donbas was made in Lisya Balka. In 1753, a new settlement replaced Lisya Balka, called the Third Regiment or Verkhnie. In 1795, the first mine in the Donbas was set up in Verkhnie to supply the new foundry in Luhansk. For its first decade, this mine provided nearly all, 91.5%, of all coal production in the Donbas. However, the settlement quickly declined in the late 1860s, which was accelerated by the Emancipation reform of 1861, with the ending of the obligatory workers system. During this time also is when the name of Lysychansk began to be adopted to refer to Verkhnie. It was revitalised in the 1890s with Belgian investments, including a soda plant and an advanced new mine. Industrial activity continued into World War One, but the following Ukrainian War of Independence and wider Russian Civil War decimated the settlement from 1917 to 1919. Power changed hands from the Bolsheviks, Imperial German troops, the Ukrainian government, and the White movement. The Communists finally secured control in December 1919, and it became part of the Soviet Union in 1922.

However, the interwar period would be rough for the city, as it was hit by severe famines and banditry. Despite this, the industry began to gradually develop as an industrial centre, especially the glass industry. During the Holodomor, it became a popular site for people fleeing from rural areas, which significantly boosted the population, leading to Lysychansk being designated a city in 1938. During the Second World War afterwards, the city would be occupied twice by Nazi Germany, during which time over 2,000 people were deported and many killed, especially the local Jews as part of the Holocaust.

After the end of the war, Lysychansk rapidly grew again alongside its industry, which led multiple divisions of the city to be broken off, most notably its twin city, Sievierodonetsk. In 1989, the city reached a peak population of 127,000, right before the collapse of the Soviet Union. In 1991, it became part of an independent Ukraine, and its industries were sold off and largely collapsed. The city received significant attention during the War in the Donbas, when it was occupied by the Luhansk People's Republic from April to July 2014. Less than a decade later, the city again received international attention again during the Russian invasion of Ukraine during the Battle of Lysychansk. With the city's capture by Russian forces on 2 July 2022, becoming the last major city in Luhansk Oblast to fall.

== Early history ==
=== Ancient period ===
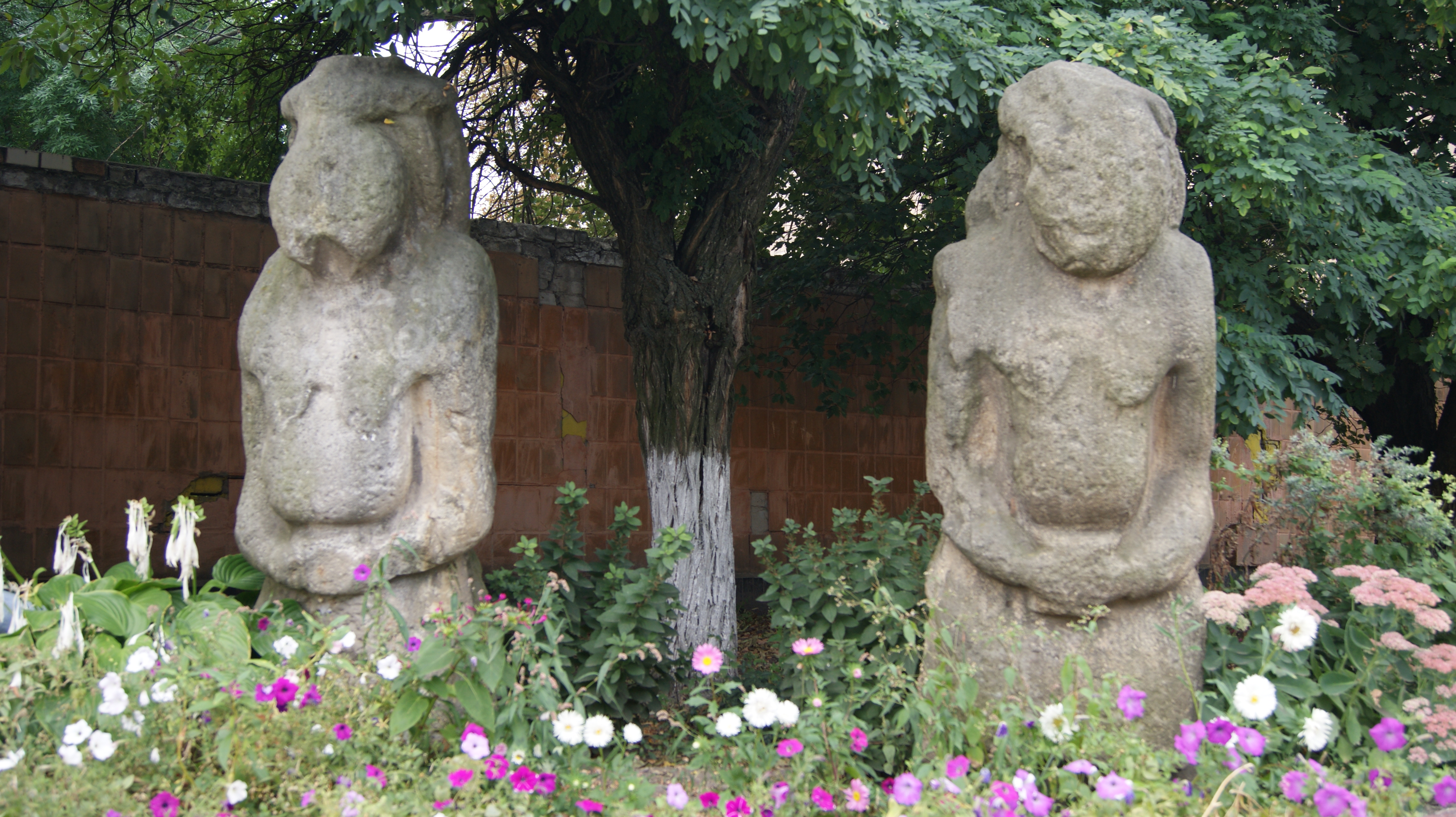
Polovtsian statues in the city.

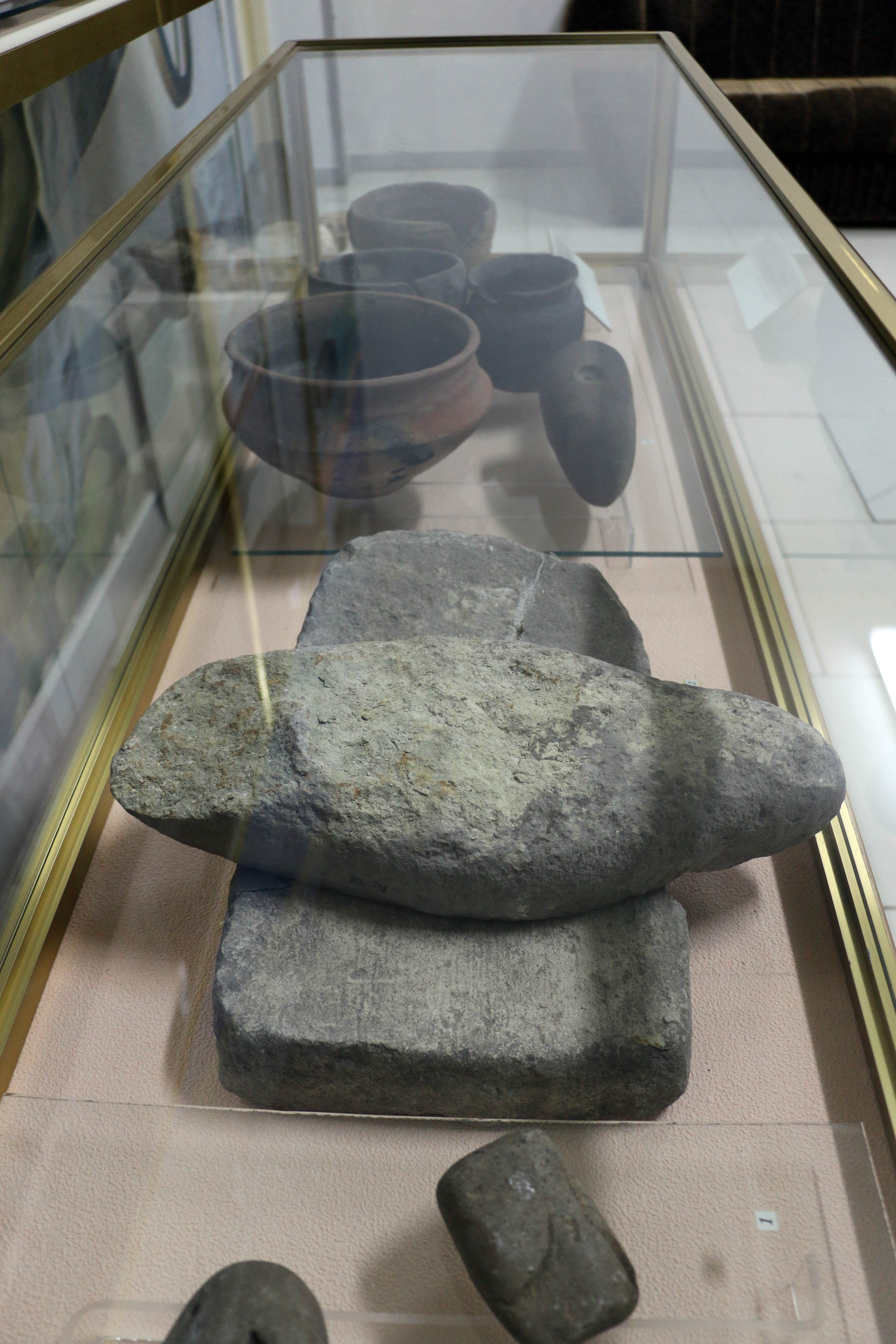
Ancient objects in the city's historical museum.

Early inhabitation dating back to the Neanderthal era during the Lower Paleolithic has been found on the banks of Siverskyi Donets. Within Lysychansk, excavations have been done which have found, at the earliest, the bones of a mammoth, which lived until the Holocene. Surveys in the vicinity of the city have found both flint flakes and blade tools that are around 20 to 30,000 years old alongside camps near the river that are from the Mesolithic era and date back from 8 to 15,000 BC. The area of modern-day Lysychansk started having a more significant population during the late Copper and Bronze Ages, when pastoral herding became common along the river. It is thought that there were numerous burial kurgans in Lysychansk, although they have been mostly destroyed, except for an excavation of 13 of them in nearby Pryvillia. The site at Pryvillia has both Yamnaya and Srubnaya burials, alongside smaller numbers of Multi-cordoned ware culture and nomadic burials which contain bronze knives and cast bronze axes. There is also a separate excavation site at the Lysychansk Bread-Products Plant within the city that also found two kurgans. The most significant discovery in the area from the Bronze Age is in the city's southwestern edge, which was discovered in 2007 during an expedition by the East Ukrainian National University. The object is a Kurgan stelae, which was found in a kurgan, which was dated back to 2700-2600 BC and likely belonged to the early Catacomb culture. It is itself unusual because unlike the other stelae that have been found around Luhansk and the Pontic steppe, it does not have either human feet or the tree of life motif, but contains multiple examples of symbolism of solar events which led some researchers to interprit it as a depiction of a solar deity from the culture. There is one more settlement from the ancient period that are near Lysychansk: it is from the Bondarikha culture that was in the late Bronze to Iron Age. The region was then inhabited by steppe people, with materials from this period like barbed arrowheads that are most likely from the Scythian people being held in the local museum, and two stone statues that are Polovtsian in the former building of a school in the city.

=== Medieval era ===
The next time the city was significantly recorded was during the medieval era, when it became part of the area ruled by the khanate of the Golden Horde. After the khanate declined, Vytautas the Great started leading expeditions in the area to conquer it as part of the Grand Duchy of Lithuania in the 1380s to 1390s, which is most evident by a fortification found dating to this period in Nyzhnie Teple (Nyzhnoteple rural hromada). After the Lithuanian influence also started to dwindle in the area, the city became a contested area between the Polish–Lithuanian union, the Grand Principality of Moscow, and the Crimean Khanate. There is a crossing point between Lysychansk and Sievierodonetsk called the "Borivskyi ford" from this era, which was used as a route during raiding parties by the Tatars and for diplomacy between the Grand Principality of Moscow and the Crimean Khanate. There are also two more significant sites dating back to this period from the city: a fortification and Borivske. The fortification had existed from at least 1672 and is now at the site of the soda plant in the city, which was used by the Cossacks to monitor the Crimean Tatars along the route in the city at the ford. The second site, Borivske, was the earliest stable settlement in the city, established around 1675 by Don Cossacks loyal to the Tsardom of Russia. No settlement had existed permanently in the city prior to this date, mostly because of the raiding route running through the city. The settlement of Krasnianskyi, which is also located in the modern-day city, was founded later in 1678, also by Cossacks.

=== Cossack resettling ===
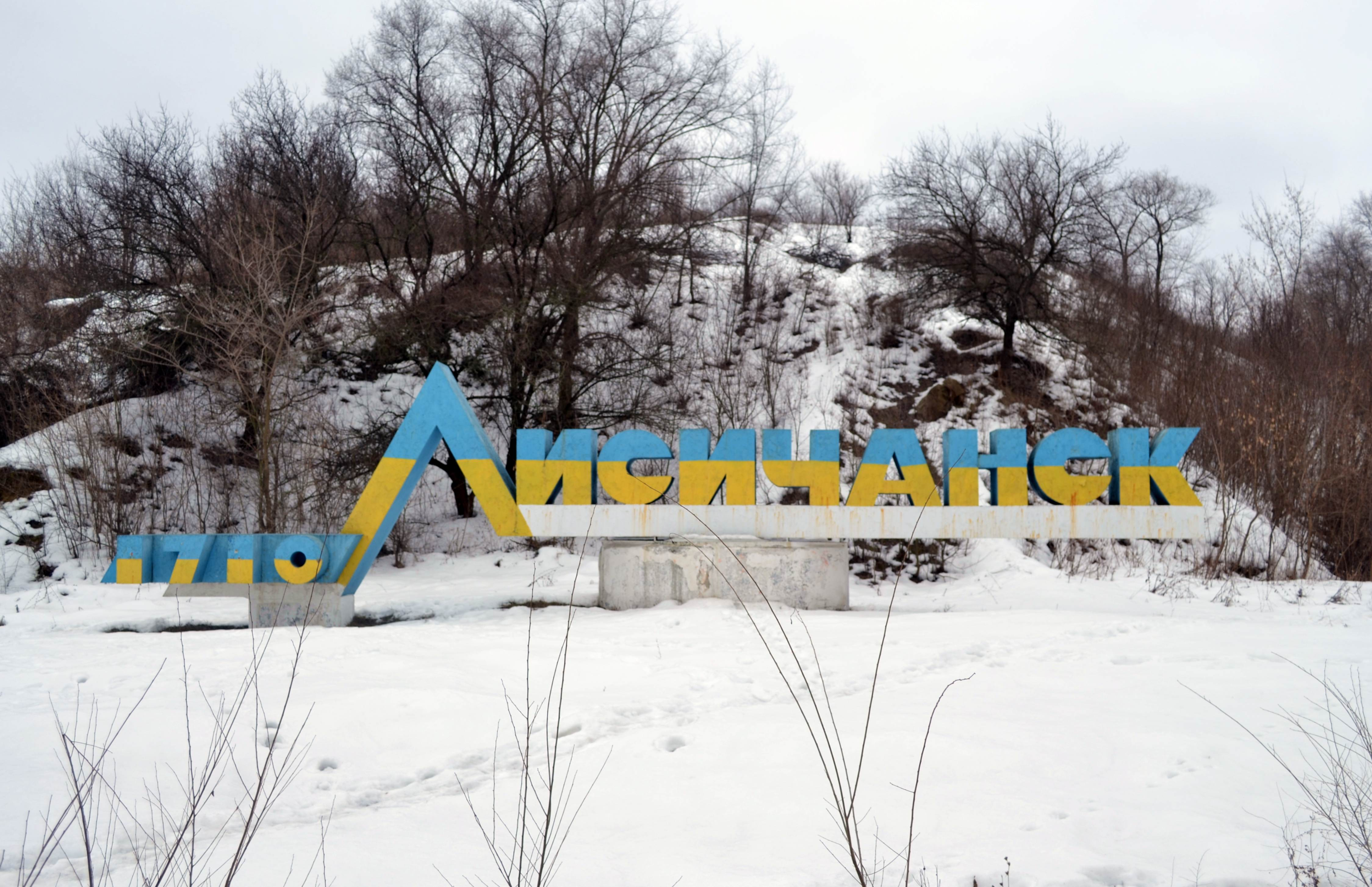
Entrance sign to the city of Lysychansk. The "1710" inscription refers to the establishment of Lisya Balka, which is considered the founding date of Lysychansk.

On 5 July 1710, another settlement was established in the area, known as Lisya Balka. The new settlement was also a Cossack settlement set up by Hetman of Ukraine, Ivan Skoropadsky, and was set up following a decree by Peter the Great that forcibly relocated them from Right-Bank Ukraine to Sloboda Ukraine in retaliation for the Cossack-led Bulavin Rebellion. Three kurins of Zaporozhian Cossacks, which consisted of 26 people, were resettled there which was confirmed by a document dated 14 December 1710 and also in a land-survey done in 1712. However, the three Cossack settlements were noted to be on the left bank of the Donets, not the right bank, to which modern-day Lysychansk would be. The village boundaries merely extended into the right bank theoretically, with the Cossacks only going to the right bank for foresty and hunting at the time, not as any proper human settlement. This was because any attempts to establish a human presence on the right bank were destroyed by either the Crimean Tatars or the Nogai raiders who had fled to the Crimean Khanate because they considered the land their own.

== Imperial city ==
=== Slavo-Serbia and Novorossiya Governorate ===
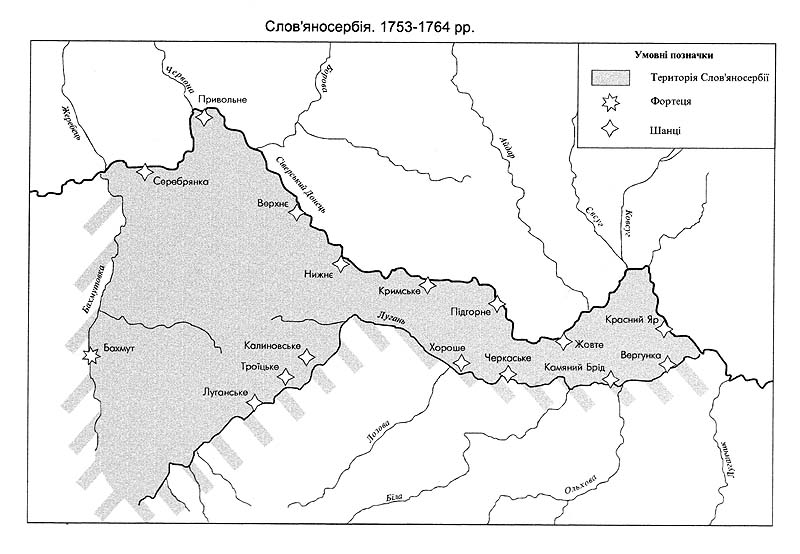
Map of Slavo-Serbia. Modern-day Lysychansk did not exist yet, as the area of the city was within the Third Company (Verkhnie), which is seen on the map as "Верхнє".

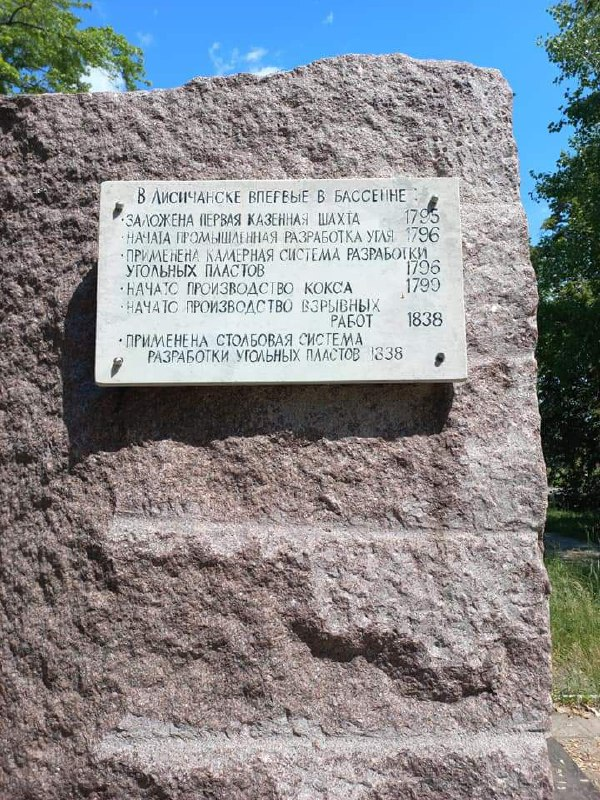
Marker in Lysychansk noting the first mine and coal extraction in the city (1795 and 1796, respectively.)

In 1721, the settlements in the city of modern-day Lysychansk started gaining some notoriety (which by this point consisted of Lisya Balka, Verkhnie, and Pryviln) after a survey discovered coal in the region. These were documented by Hryhorii Kapustin or Chirkov and Vepreisky. (Note: Volodymyr Podov, in his book about the history of the city, disputes Kapustin being the finder of the first coal, despite this being the most widely accepted claim. Podov states in his book that Kapustin had never been in the area, only ever having discovered coal in Shakhty. He cites as proof that a 1724 expedition went to the area that Kapustin claimed had coal in the Donbas, but found nothing. He instead says that the ones to actually find the coal, contrary to Soviet-era claims, were Semyon Chirkov and Mykyta Vepreisky, who started the large-scale coal extraction in 1723. He says they discovered the coal while searching for fuel under incentives brought upon by Peter the Great with his law known as the Berg Privilege, which allowed representatives of all classes to search for ores.) In order to confirm this discovery, a secondary survey was done in 1722, which again confirmed coal in the area. This was the first discovery of coal in the Donets Basin. (Note: Podov also disputes that Lysychansk was the area of the first discovery of coal in the Donbas. He claims that it was instead Balka Skelevata (modern-day Luhanske), which is near Bakhmut in Donetsk Oblast. Podov argues this from a journal entry that documents coal samples found near the "Bakhmut salt works" in 1722. Furthermore, he also says the first coal found in Luhansk Oblast was also not in Lysychansk but in Yashchykove near Alchevsk during a secondary expedition after Balka Skelevata.) In addition, alongside the deposit in Shakhty (now within Rostov Oblast, Russia), the two locations are where industrially viable coal deposits were first identified in the Russian Empire. Due to this, in 1723, the first large-scale coal extraction began in the area on the river by Captain Semyon Chirkov and administrator Mykyta Vepreisky. Under decrees established in March to April 1753, the area in which modern-day Lysychansk lies on the right bank would finally have proper settlements. This was done under Elizabeth of Russia, who settled two hussar regiments consisting to Balkan people in the region under Jovan Šević and Rajko Preradović in the region to form the new territory of the Russian Empire, Slavo-Serbia. The hussars founded three settlements in modern-day Lysychansk afterwards: the village of the Third Company (on the territory of Verkhnie) in 1754, the Fifth Company (on the territory of Pryvillia), and a private settlement on the outskirts of Rubizhne. The Third Company is the site on which most of Lysychansk is located, as the other two became satellite towns. By 1757, the total population of Verkhnie was 71. Just two decades later, and the population was 796, even though the Bakhmut Hussar Regiment was disbanded in the 1770s and the area became part of the Novorossiya Governorate following the abolishment of Slavo-Serbia. Despite life in the settlement not being great due to lack of medical care which led to rampant diseases, the population recorded over 1,000 by 1795.

=== Growth as a mining centre ===
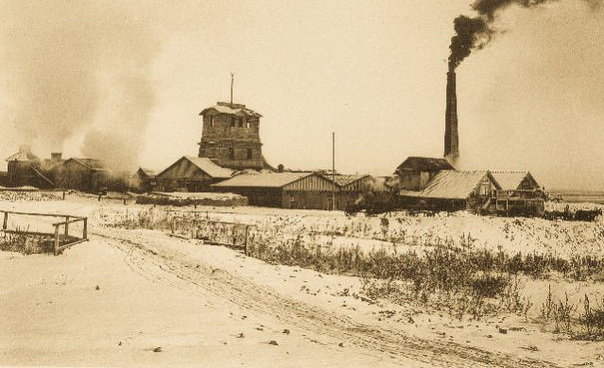
A mine in the city in 1872.

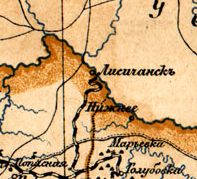
A map of the governorate, zoomed into Lysychansk, from the 1800s.

In the late 1780s, Mykola Avramov, alongside members of the Black Sea Fleet returned to Verkhnie in order to investigate the settlement's mineral resources. Under Avramov, an expedition began in the area for extracting coal at four sites, which was reported by Rear Admiral Kaslivtsev in Mykolaiv to the government of Ivan Chernyshyov about possible governmental coal extraction. In 1795, this finally came into fruition, mainly driven by the Black Sea Fleet's need for fuel. This was the first time that coal extraction had begun in Imperial Russia since 1725, with the death of Peter the Great. The law that approved this was Catherine II's decree of 14 November 1795, which mandated that the first mine ever in the Donbas was to be established at area of Lisya Balka (which, by this time, referred not to the previous Cossack settlement but to the terrain) in the village of Verkhnie. It was incorporated in the decree as a subdivision of the foundry in Luhansk, and was specifically tasked to supply coal to this foundry and the Black Sea Fleet. The site in Lisya Balka was chosen by Charles Gascoigne, of the factory in Petrozavodsk, and is now considered the founder of Luhansk, because he deemed it shallow and gently dipping and best suited for mining, with the river close by for water transport. Skilled workers were brought in from Petrozavodsk and Lipetsk in modern-day Russia to help with the new mine.

The mine yielded its first coal in April 1796, and was known as the "Petropavlivska mine". For the first six years, from 1796 to 1801, the mine alongside the later Mytrofanivska was where all Russian coal production came from. By 1797, the mine comprised four shafts, which was aided by a new 28-inch bituminous coal seam that was discovered free of sulfur. A year later, in 1798, the coal output was 330,467 pools, with the vast majority of the product going to the Luhansk Foundry itself. However, the Collegium of Mining's director M.F. Soimonov that year ordered Gascoigne to make sure that the coal extracted also went to open sale for businesses and nearby villages, with 34,750 poods of coal being sold externally by 1799. Another mine was opened up to help with the extraction called Mytrofanivska, which was 30 sazhens downhill from the original mine. In 1801, the first mine in the Donbas outside of Lysychansk was opened up in Stanytsia Luhanska, and another three soon after although across the Donbas mining's first decade of the 2,418,403 poods extracted the mines in Verkhnie accounted for 91.5% of production.

The miners initially resided in temporary peasant housing in Verkhnie. (Note: Verkhnie eventually broke off into an independent village, while the mining settlement would become what is now known as Lysychansk. However, Verkhnie was absorbed into Lysychansk in 1965, and is now considered part of the city.) There was also a separate settlement of barracks and stone houses directly at the mine site itself (Verkhnie was five versts away from the mine), although this settlement for many years had no name and was simply referred to as "the craftsmen's settlement". An 1801 listing recorded 51 residential structures and 554 people in this settlement. A further 1803 report called the mining settlement for the first time as a "sloboda called Lysycha Balka (Lisya Balka)", and an 1838 mining survey simply referred to it by the surrounding terrain of Lisya Balka also. Nevertheless, the name "Lysychansk" also came into popular use, being referred to as such by the foundry in Luhansk and the Mining Journal. It took until around the 1850s for the name Lysychansk to transition into formal use to describe this settlement, which is seen in an 1864 charter of "the village of Lysychansk". In the next few decades of the early 1800s, deeper shafts were sunk in the mines, and a new one, Volodymyrska, was also opened up. Technical innovations were also done, with the first steam engine in the Donbas being put in the mines alongside an iron rail track in Petropavlivska's main gallery.

=== Emancipation and initial decline ===
A decree on 10 January 1821 by Alexander I ordered that the residents of Verkhnie be reclassified as "obligatory workers" to the foundry in Luhansk instead of the former system that used peasants from other villages. However, these obligatory workers at the mine alleged widespread abuse under this system, including land seizures in Verkhnie and financial exploitation, leading some of the obligatory workers to refuse to work. In 1832, the Ministry of Finance ruled against them in favour of the military tribunal, although all the obligatory workers were pardoned under an amnesty followed Nicholas I's coronation. Due to the case, the obligatory worker status of Verkhnie was abolished and instead were reclassified to be artisans of the foundry. However, by the 1850s, demand for coal from the settlement dramatically declined as private investors, such as those from other European countries, moved elsewhere in the Donbas and to areas where the proxomity to Black Sea shipping routes made it easy to transport coal. The Emancipation reform of 1861 only accelerated this, as serfdom was abolished, which included the state-owned serfs in the state-owned mines in the area. Also, the people in Lysychansk and Verkhnie were no longer classified as obligatory workers/artisans, and thus were not obliged to participate in mine work. After emancipation, the peasants were also given land in Lysychansk, although this was only a very small amount and any coal, ore, or stone deposits still remained property of the state, which led to considerable rates of poverty and a growing social stratification.

As the mines in the settlement rapidly declined, they were sold by the state to be privately owned, such as the mine of Dagmara that was leased to merchants. This was followed by Orlovskyi, and Matroskyi ran out of coal. As these mines were sold off, the skilled labour from the state mines in Lysychansk moved to other privately owned mines in the Donbas. The first major crisis in the privately owned mines that still existed in Lysychansk - which by the 1880s was 13 - was in the aftermath of the Russo-Turkish War (1877–1878) which led to a severe downturn in 1881-82 and a depression in the 1890s.

=== Reinvestment and early 1900s ===
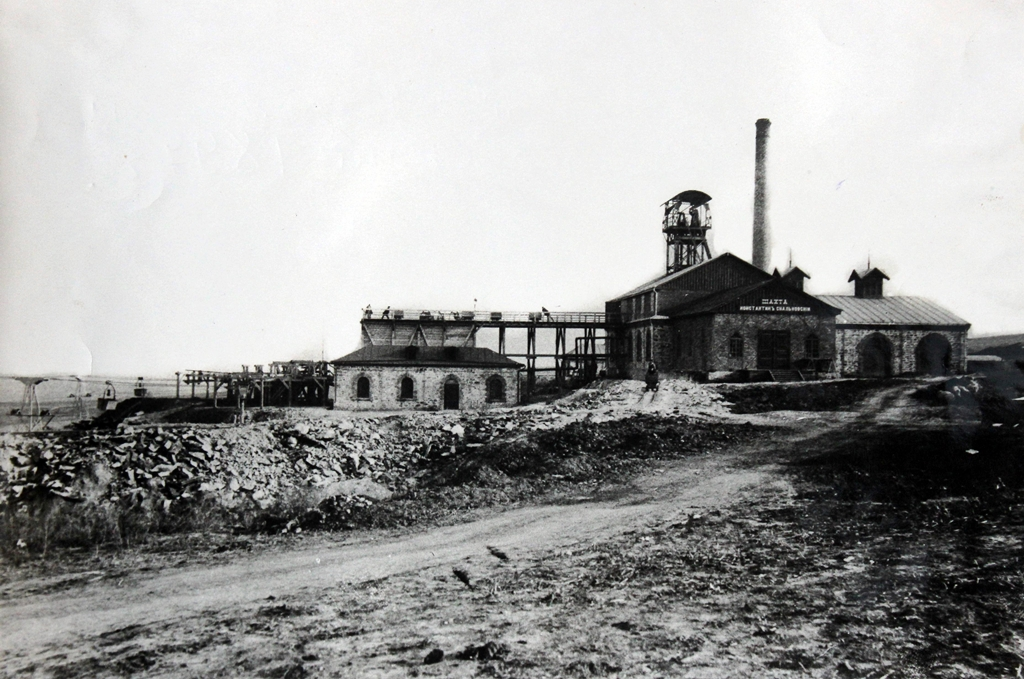
Konstantin Skalkovsky mine, opened up in 1897 by the soda plant. At the time, it was considered the largest and most technically advanced mine in the Donbas.

Despite the financial situation of the mines, they still received some investments. The largest of these was in 1890, when the Belgian industrialist Ernest Solvay built a soda plant with surrounding infrastructure for the Belgian staff. In 2017 these buildings (a gymnasium, a hospital and a range of residential buildings) won the 'Belgian Heritage Abroad Award'. In 1897, the soda plant also opened up the "Konstantin Skalkovsky" shaft, which at the time was the largest and most technically advanced in all of the Donbas. It included the Donbas's first aerial cableway meant for coal transport. Together with Dagmara, the mine accounted for around 60% of all of Lysychansk's output by 1901.

Unlike other cities in the Donbas, the 1905 Russian Revolution did not have a major impact on the village of Lysychansk. In fact, industrialisation accelerated in the village after it, with new extraction technology being imported from Germany and the United States coming into use in the local shafts. By 1913, the village's coal industry had expanded rapidly from its initial decline in the late 1800s. With the start of World War One in August 1914, the need for coal increased significantly also as the Russian Empire lost both the Dąbrowa Basin and foreign coal imports from the Central Powers, such as Imperial Germany. Due to this, the government in 1915 exempted all mine owners from conscription in the Imperial Russian Army, although this was changed in 1917 when the Russian Provisional Government took power and started to conscript miners.

== Soviet era ==
=== Russian Civil War ===
==== 1917 ====
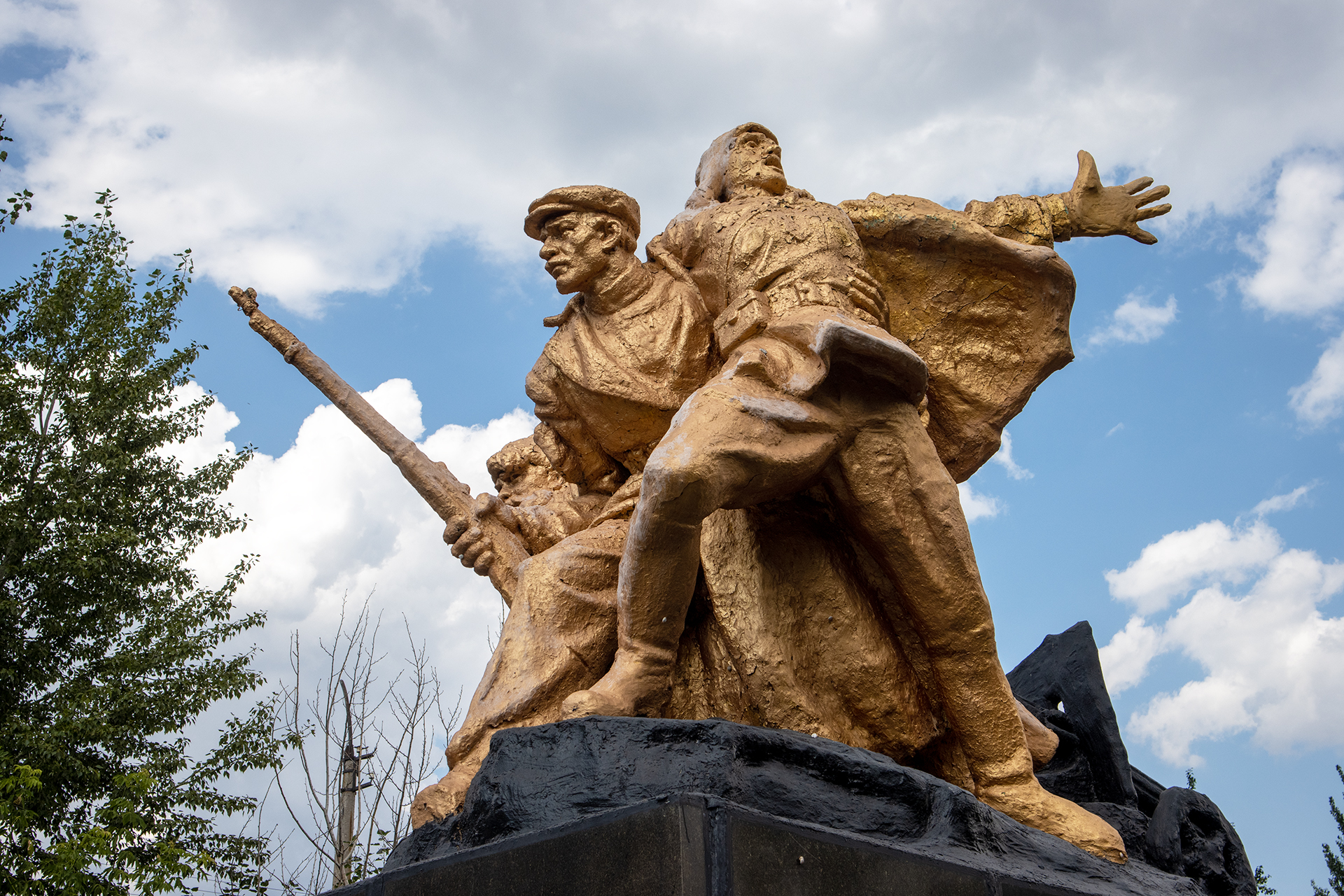
Monument to the people who established Soviet power in the city.

On 5 March 1917, news of the February Revolution reached the city. In response, a provisional committee of the city was formed, which was dominated by intelligentsia for a short time. However, elections were held soon thereafter for the committee, which ended up with the committee being dominated by both the Mensheviks and Kadets, with no Bolsheviks being elected to the council. Meanwhile, in the spring, a Ukrainian hromada was also established within the settlement that focused on advocating Ukrainian-language schooling and aligning with the Ukrainian Central Rada. There was also a branch of the Prosvita established in June, and the Ukrainian workers at the soda factory established a local branch of the Ukrainian Social Democratic Labour Party (USDRP). Separately, the Bolsheviks also organised their own organisation within the soda factory for representation. By late 1917, prior to the October Revolution, multiple factions had formed within the city: the Free Cossacks (who were aligned with the Ukrainian People's Republic for Ukrainian autonomy within Russia), the "Soldiers' Organisation (also aligned with the UPR), and militia detachments (aligned with the Bolsheviks).

According to Soviet-era sources, the October Revolution, where the Bolsheviks seized power from the Provisional Government, was met with particular enthusiasm by the miners, who themselves formed Red Guard detachments. This was followed by a new election in November for the local committee, where the Menshevik–SR bloc continued to dominate with 24 seats, although this time the Bolsheviks won 9. However, the Ukrainians denounced the Bolshevik seizure of power in the territory, and in response, in the Third Universal of the Ukrainian Central Rada declared the establishment of an independent Ukrainian People's Republic, with the settlement of Lysychansk becoming part of the UPR's territory on the very border of the Polovtsian Land next to the Don territory. The Bolsheviks responded to this in the First All-Ukrainian Congress of Soviets, declaring the Ukrainian–Soviet War. After the war started, the Soviets took over Lysychansk as part of the Donetsk–Krivoy Rog Soviet Republic, encountering little resistance from the 1st Zaporizhska Infantry Division of the UPR after their disarmament at Kupiansk, which allowed them to go en route to Luhansk. Nevertheless, organisations associated with the UPR continued to function in the city, particularly the Soldiers' Organisation, which frequently attacked the newly declared Bolshevik revkom. In January 1918, a local newspaper started to be published in the city. After 20 March 1918, the Donetsk-Krivoy Rog was disbanded and replaced with the Ukrainian SSR.

==== 1918 ====
However, Bolshevik control did not last long: in early 1918, the Central Powers started to intervene in the war in order to help set up the new territories set up in the Treaty of Brest-Litovsk in which the Soviets surrendered their claim to Ukraine. The Imperial German Army entered Lysychansk in April 1918, and began its occupation. What happened in the lead-up to this remains controversial. On one hand, Ukrainian sources state that the Bolsheviks who retreated under Kliment Voroshilov were fired upon by members of the Soldiers' Organisation at a bridge in the settlement and that multiple of the Bolsheviks were arrested by local authorities. They say this led Voroshilov to threaten to fire upon the settlement unless they were released, which did not happen and so he ordered the Bolsheviks leaving to fire upon the factories. Meanwhile, the Soviets claimed that the Soldiers' Organisation was not trying to help the UPR, but instead the German forces in taking the town, and that they fired upon the leaving Bolsheviks and the settlement. Nevertheless, Lopatin says that after the Germans took power, the Bolsheviks retreated underground and formed an organisation to conduct propaganda against both the Ukrainians and the Germans. Following the deposition of the UPR and establishment of the Ukrainian State, the Ukrainians de jure controlled the area, but soon after, in November 1918, the Directorate of Ukraine of the UPR declared the Anti-Hetman Uprising in the Donbas.

During this time, Lysychansk became a key area of defense in the Donbas. The settlement became the headquarters of the Haidamaka Cavalry Regiment under Omelian Voloh of the UPR. The regiment recruited local volunteers in the settlement and also began to fight the Bolsheviks, who were again planning to advance in the region. At the same time, the German Revolution happened and so the Germans who were still in the settlement adopted neutrality. They, in December 1918, allowed the remaining troops to join the UPR's units after they began to leave the area.

==== 1919 ====
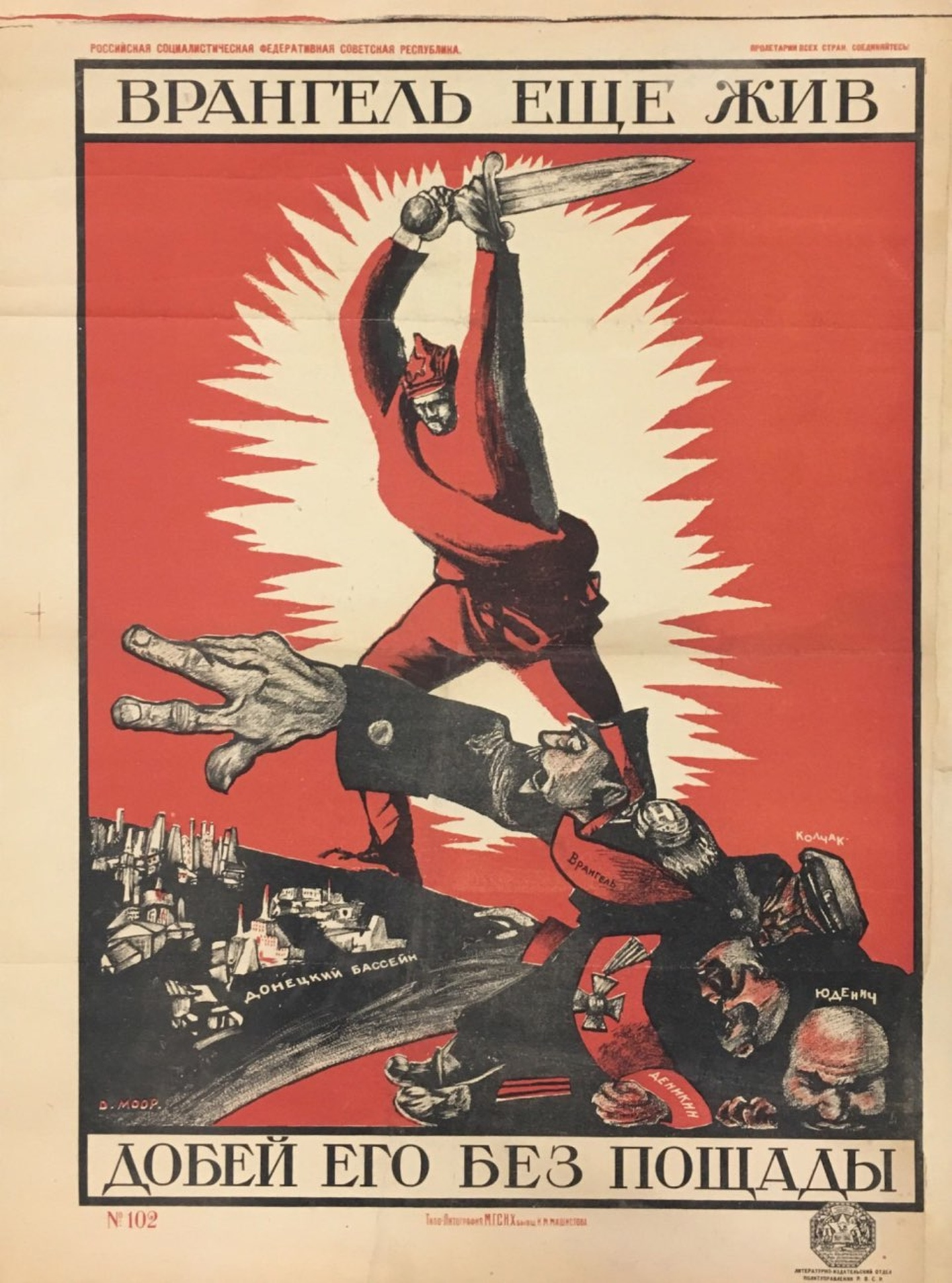
Soviet propaganda poster c. 1920. It says "Wrangel is still alive. Finish him off without mercy," referring to the White movement trying to retake the Donbas.

In early January 1919, the Soviets began their invasion of Ukraine after the annulment of the Treaty of Brest-Litovsk following the collapse of Germany. They quickly recaptured Lysychansk. The now Bolshevik-controlled committee declared in a resolution on 2 February 1919 that the Soviets were the only legitimate authority in the city. During that same time, multiple anti-Bolshevik uprisings occurred, such as one by members of the Soldiers' Organisation who attacked the revkom building in the city, attempting to seize power, but they were all defeated. Conditions during this time were harsh: there was a heavy food crisis in this period when the Soviets had control, with rations being distributed irregularly, which led to a typhus epidemic. In an attempt to combat this, Prodrazverstka was introduced by decree. Separately, all of the settlement's mines were in severe disrepair, with workers having either left for the front or evacuated prior. Due to both of these conditions, on 29 April 1919, the area of Lysychansk was put under martial law, with the revkom assuming full authority as citizens in the settlement were evacuated after the White movement began to advance into the Donbas.

Thus, the Whites regained control in July 1919 after gaining Kharkiv shortly prior. Soviet-era sources - although biased - describe the White occupation as far more brutal than the prior German/Ukrainian occupation. In the autumn of 1919, a partisan detachment under a man known as Korobkin started harassing the forces of Denikin. The occupation by the Whites would last until 23 December 1919, after the failure of the Whites to hold the Voronezh Governorate, which led the Soviets to start the Donbas operation. This was the last time the settlement would switch hands during the war.

==== Maps ====
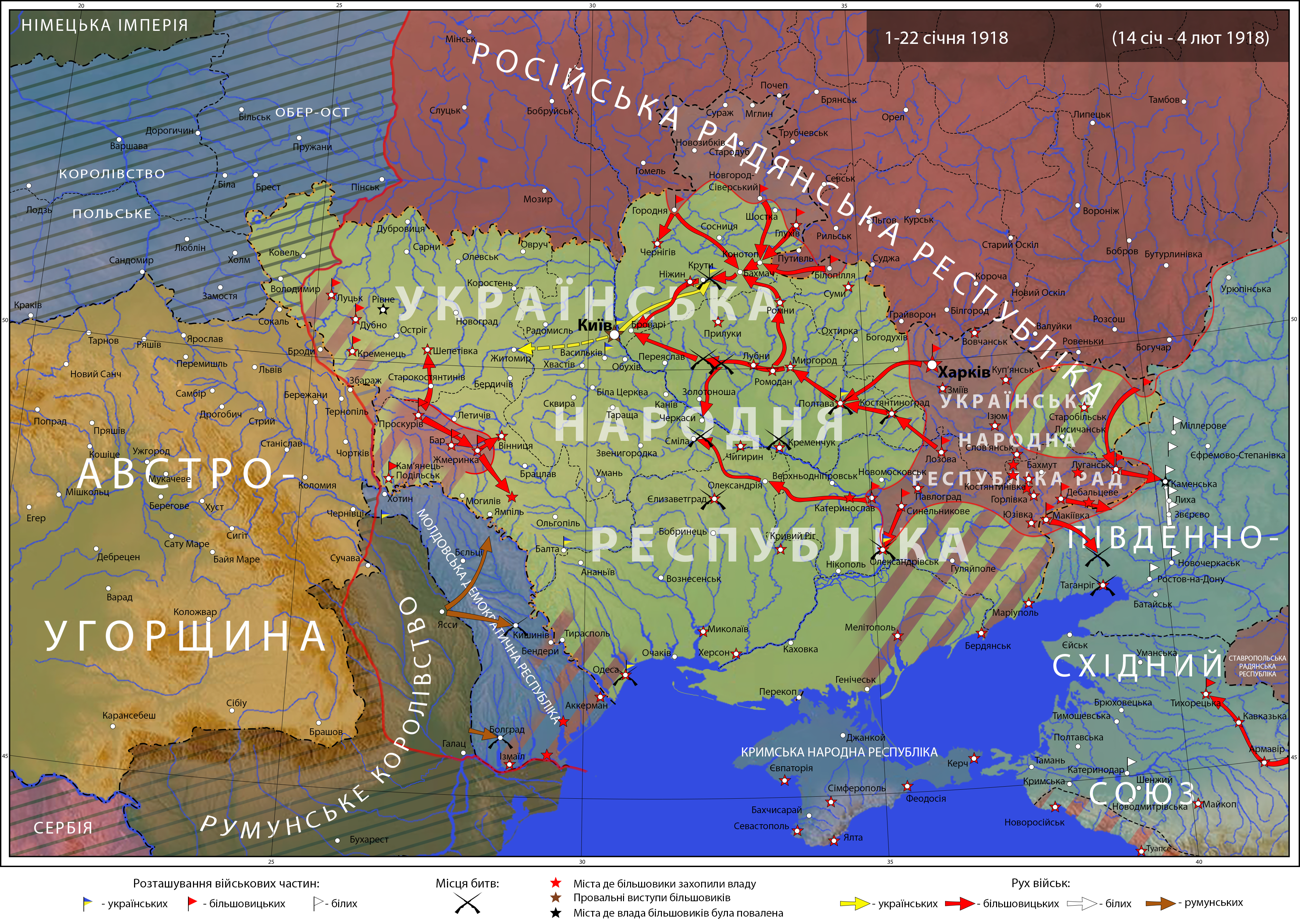
Situation in January 1918. On the map, Lysychansk is in a disputed area of both Ukrainian and Soviet control.

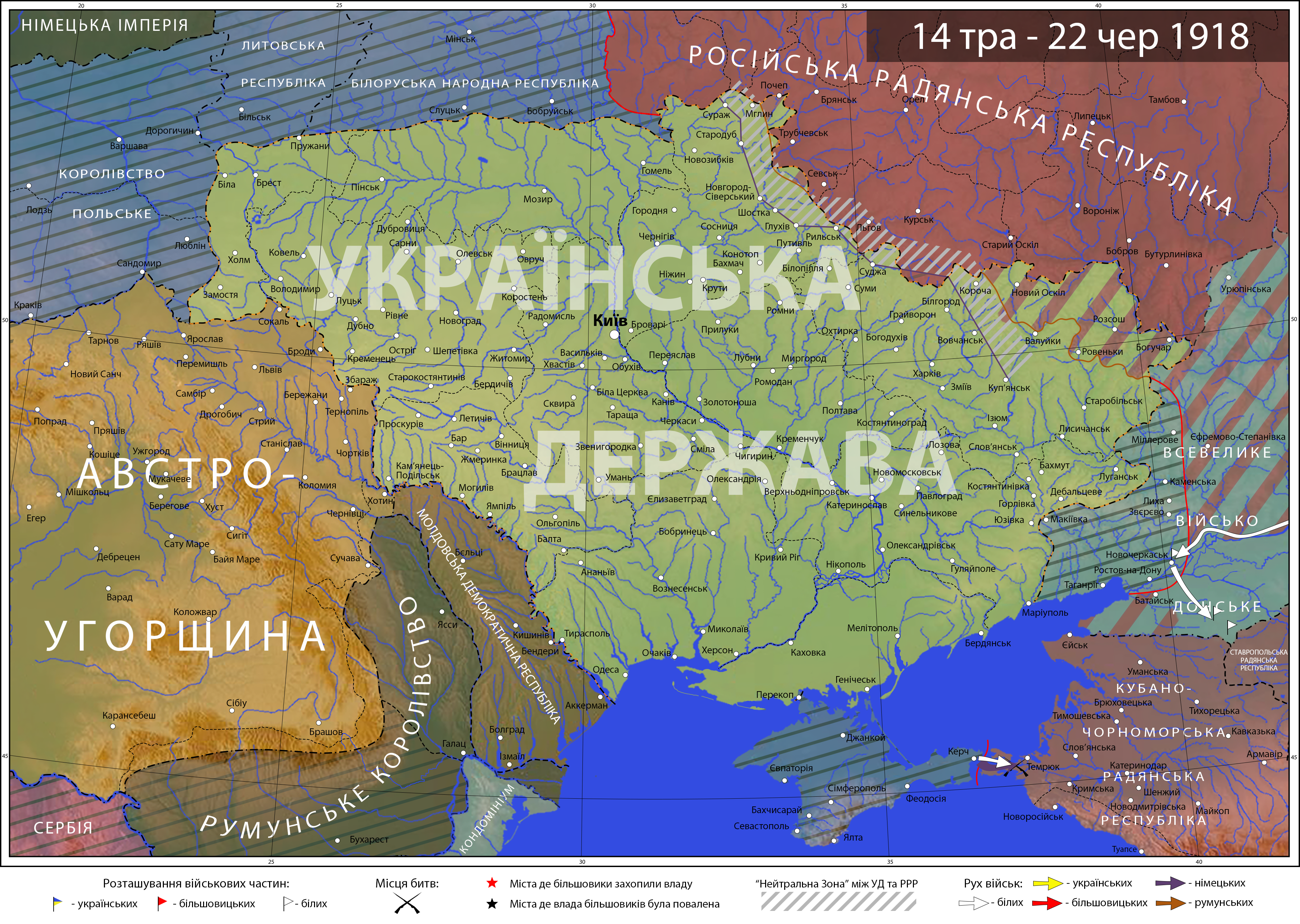
Situation in May to June 1918. With German assistance, Ukraine has recovered Lysychansk

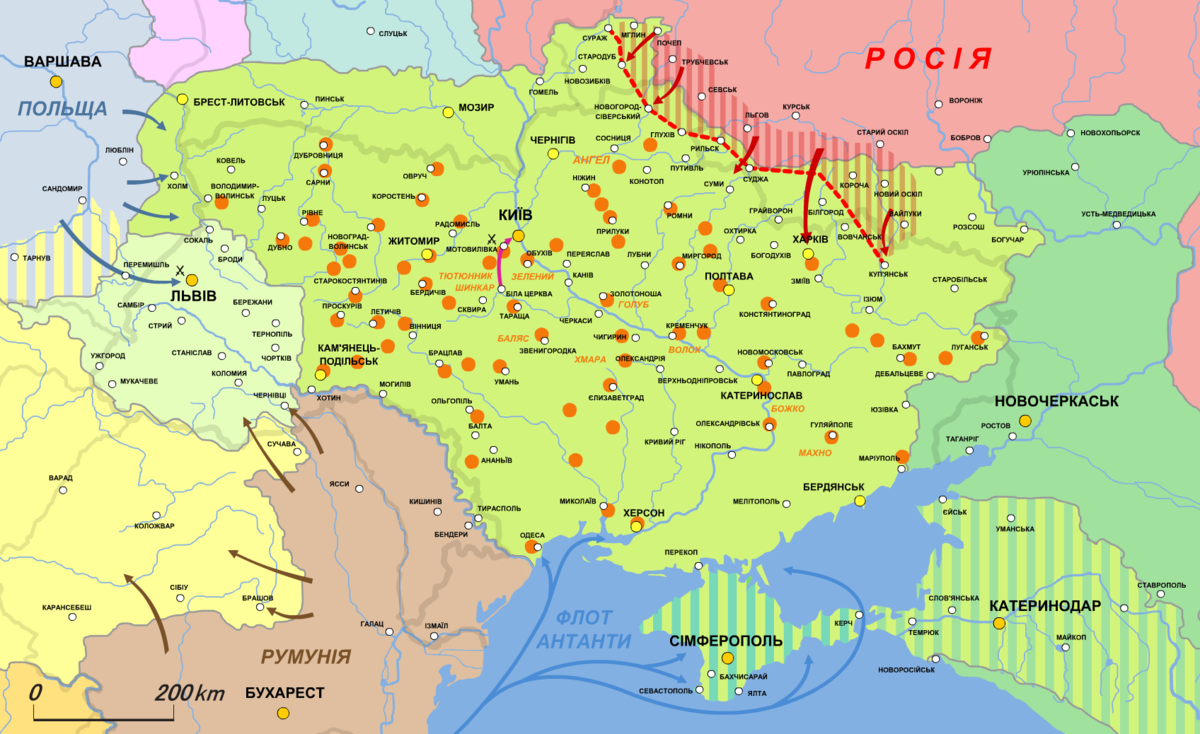
Situation in November 1918. Control is contested between the Ukrainian State and the UPR with the Anti-Hetman Uprising.

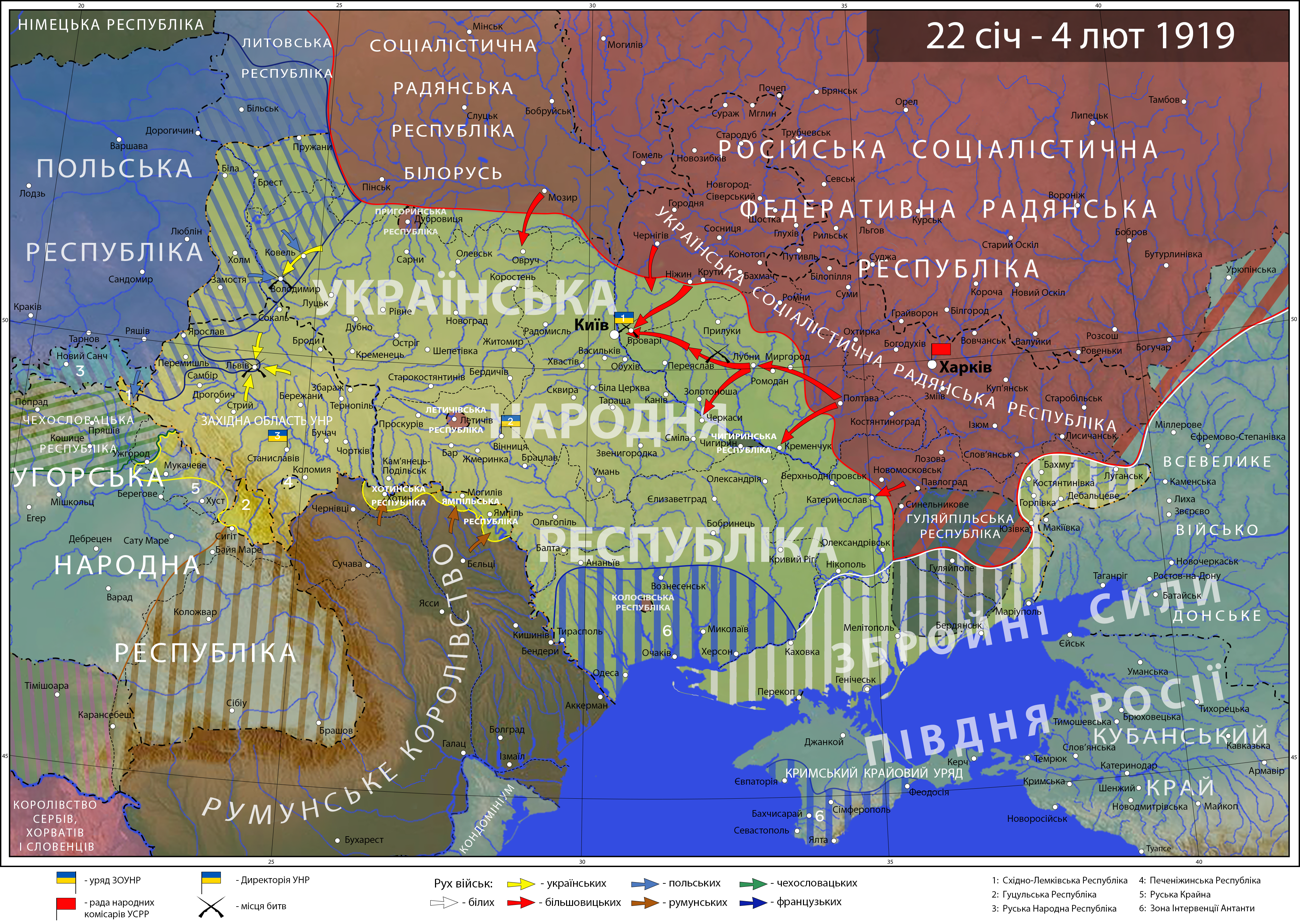
Situation from January to February 1919. The Soviets have taken control of Lysychansk, with the Ukrainians pushed back into a pocket in nearby Bakhmut, which is in contention with the Whites.

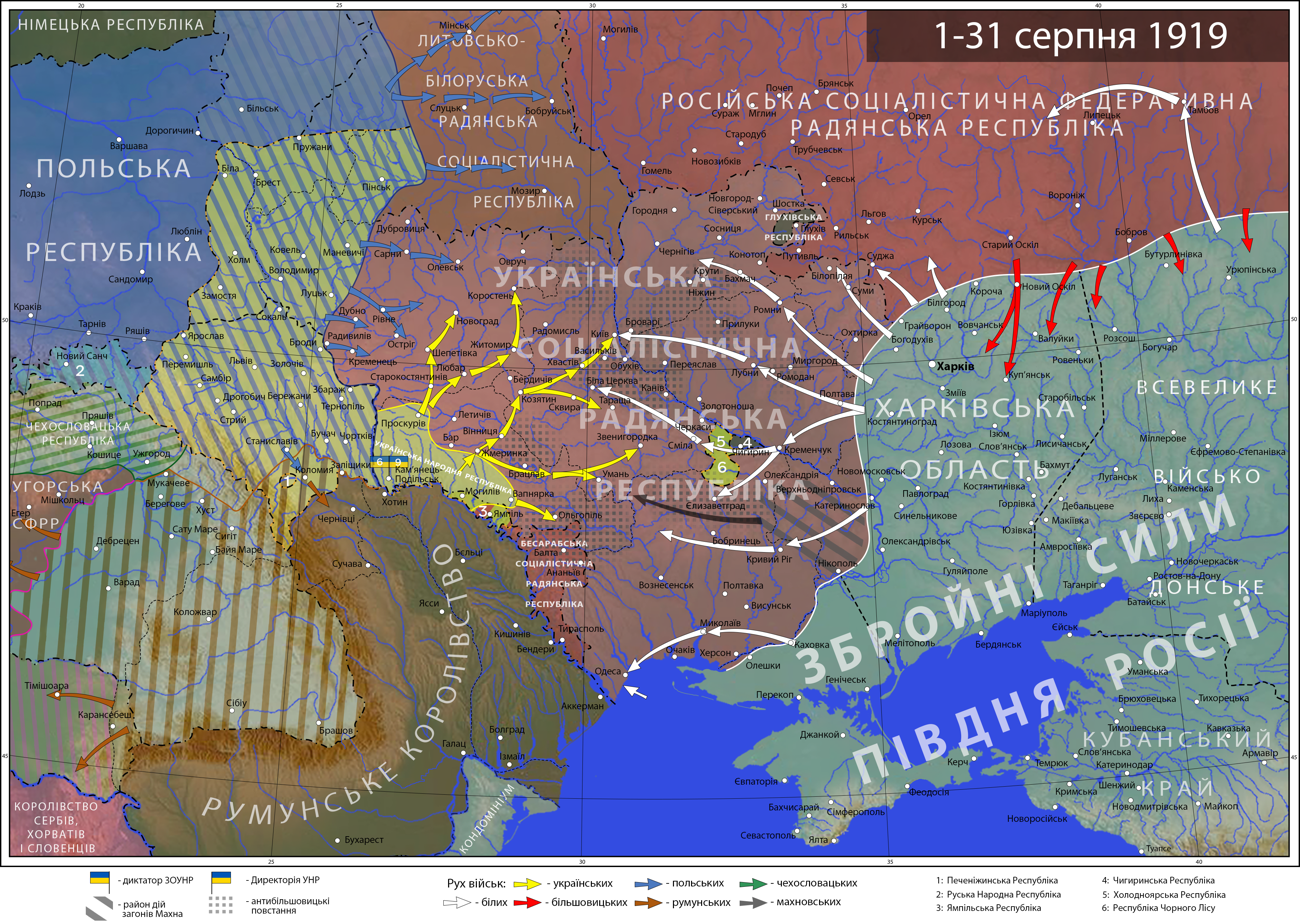
Situation in August 1919. Whites take over control of Lysychansk from the Soviets who are pushing into western Ukraine. Soviets are mounting attacks nearby in Kramatorsk.

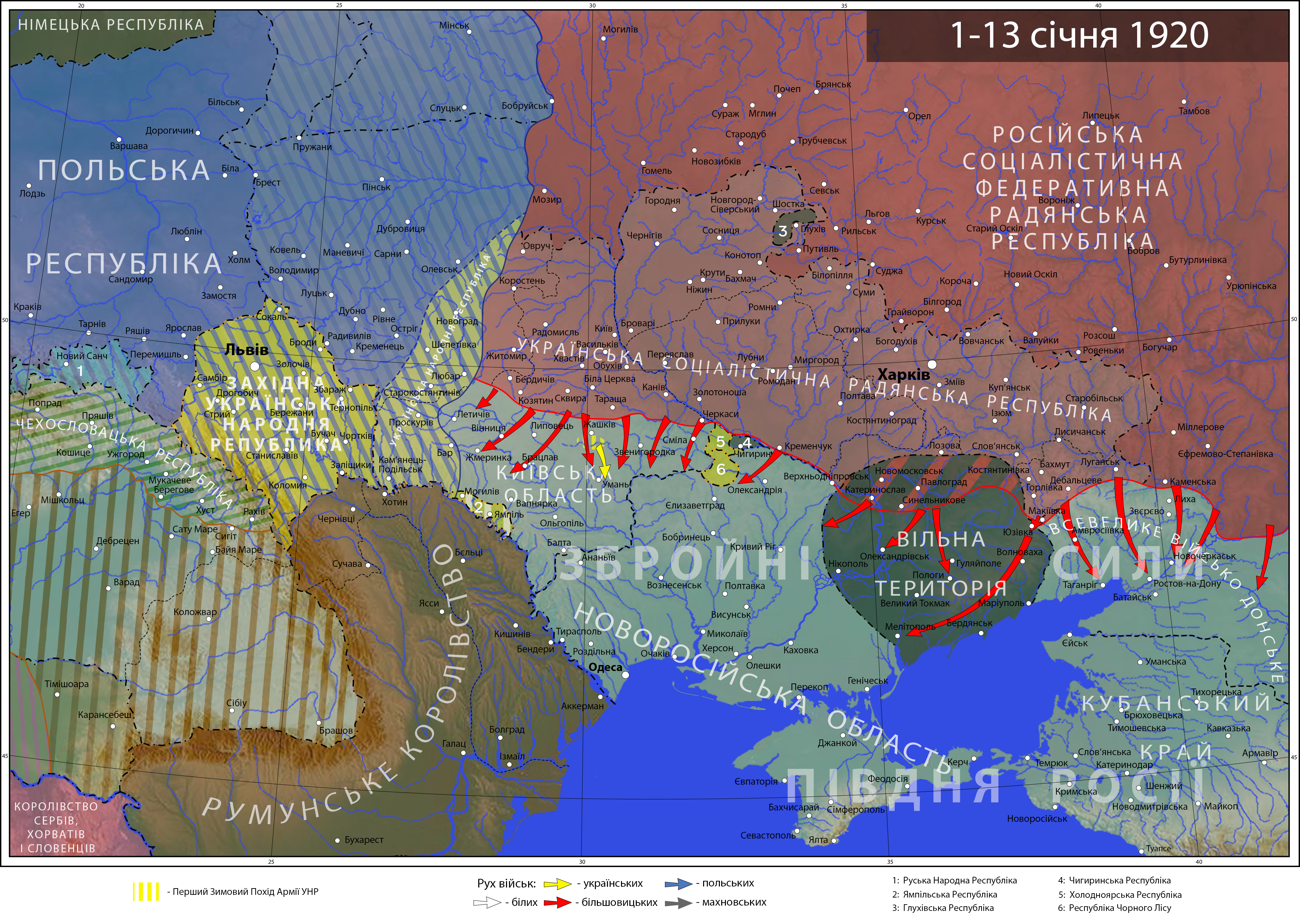
Situation in January 1920. Lysychansk is regained by the Soviets, which is the last time the city would change handsd. In addition, although Makhno's Makhnovshchina had some influence in the area during the Bolshevik–Makhnovist conflict, they would never actually control the city.

=== Stalin-era industrialisation and Holodomor ===
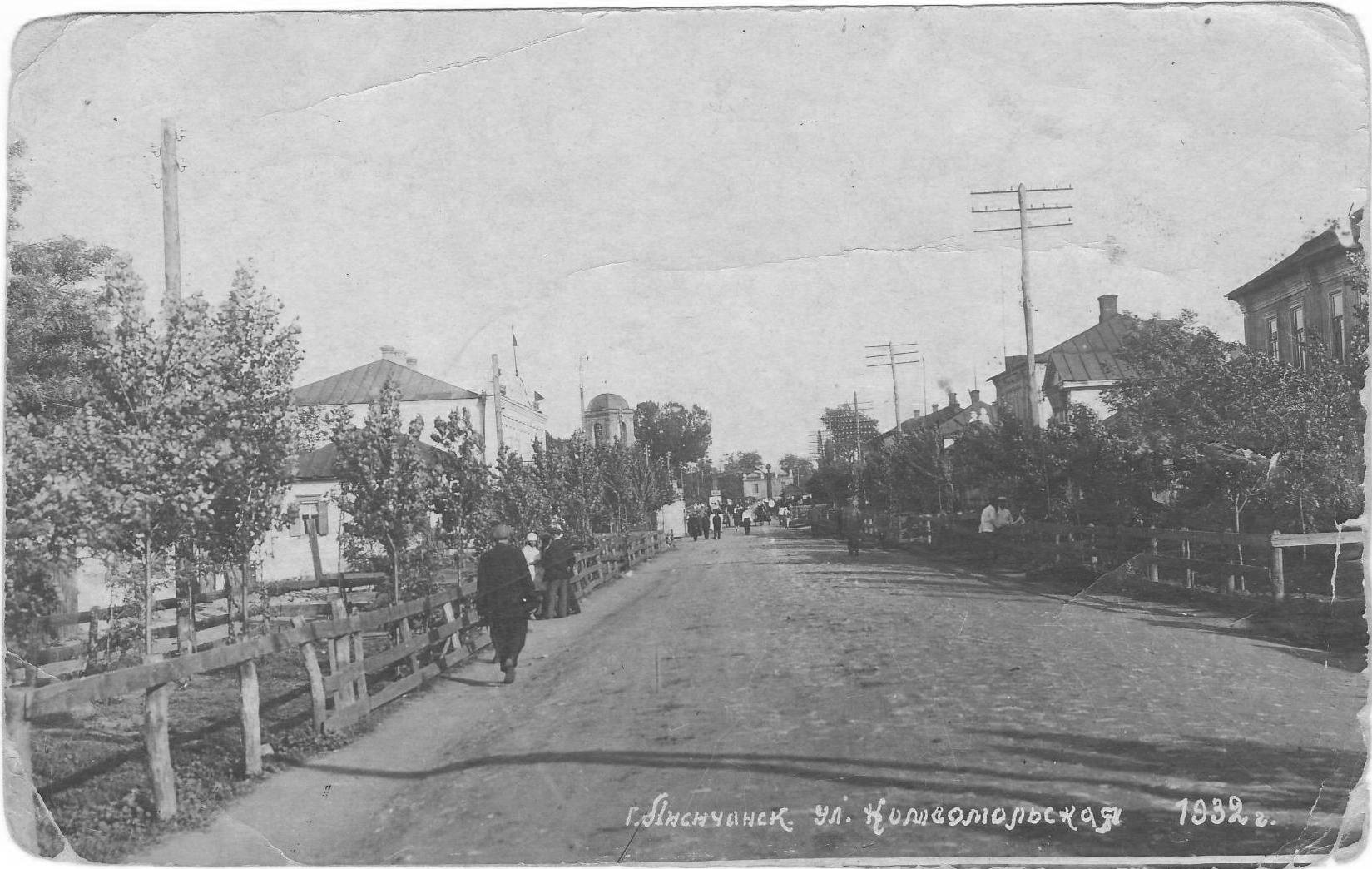
Lysychansk in 1932.

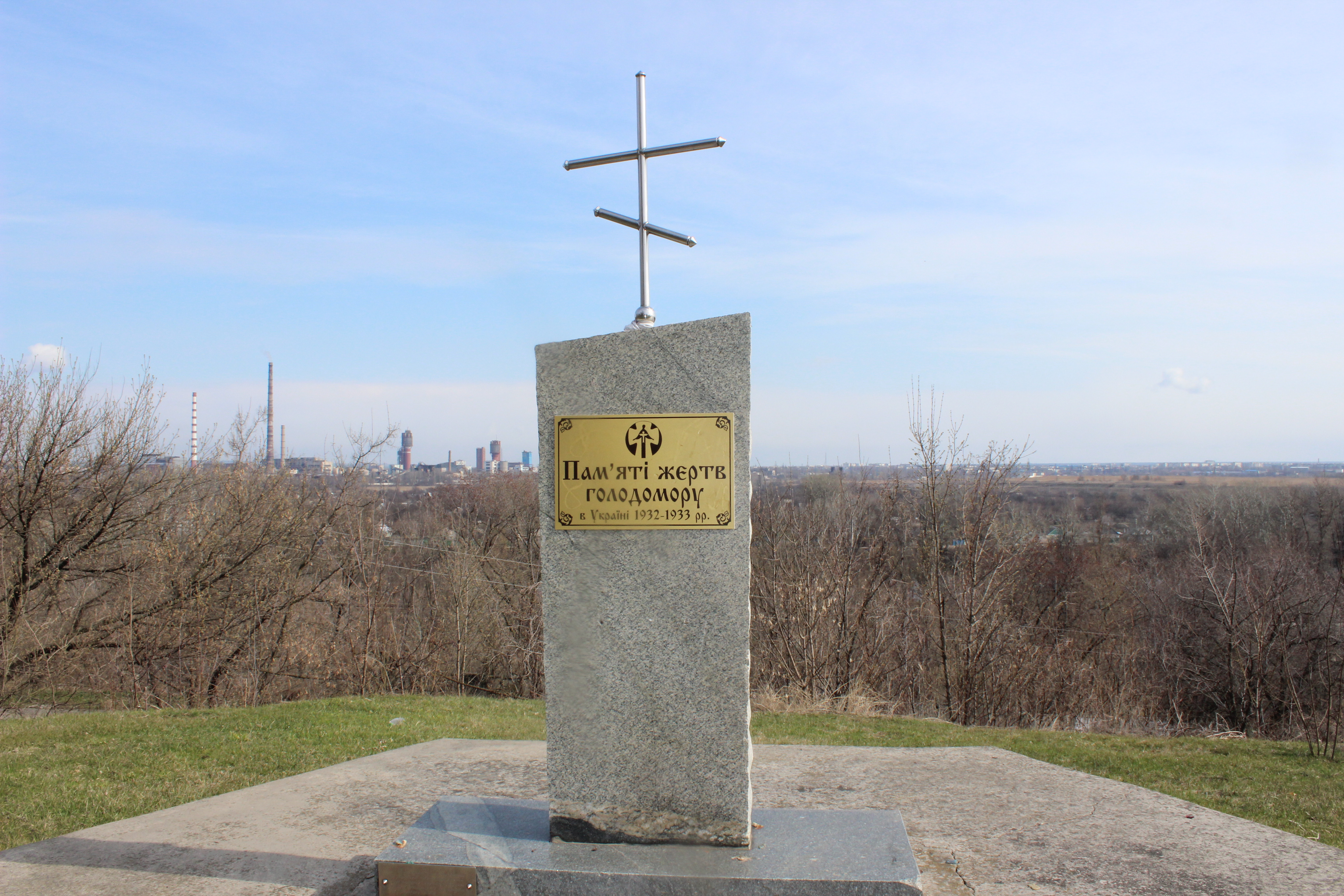
Memorial to victims of the Holodomor.

After the Soviets regained control, a period of reconstruction in the aftermath of the war began, as the settlement was decimated by the war. It subsequently became part of the Donets Governorate. The settlement was particularly prone to bandits and insurgents because of the thick forestry (such as the local insurgency under Roman Shapovalov. There were also repeated raids by forces under the anarchist Nestor Makhno, as part of the wider Bolshevik–Makhnovist conflict after the Soviets attacked the Makhnovshchina in southern Ukraine. In addition, severe famines still persisted, and of the entire Donets Governorate, the Lysychansk area had the highest number of orphans. In early February 1921, Makhno's forces finally attacked the area while in Starobilsk, very briefly capturing the settlement on 4 February to gain ammunition until they retreated back to the forests.

Nevertheless, in order to reconstruct from the impact of the war, the Council of Labour and Defence of the Ukrainian SSR ordered a resolution entitled "On the Restoration of the Donbas Coal Industry", in order to help bring back the devastated mines. All of the plants and mines in the settlement were put under the state trust "Khimvuhillia". During this time, as a result, the industries began to slowly recover, although the coal mines were separated into new trusts known as "Soiuzvuhillia" then "Artemvuhilliia". The glass industry significantly grew during this time, as Nasvitevychevo was already Ukraine's second-largest glass producer and a new mechanised glass plant was constructed, which was at the time the largest of its kind in Europe. Local healthcare industry was also improved with the opening of new polyclinics (although there was still only 115 beds for a population of over 20,000), and full and compulsory primary schooling was implemented. By decree of the Presidium of the Supreme Soviet of the Ukrainian SSR on 28 October 1938, Lysychansk was classified as a city.

Since Lysychansk was an industrial centre and did not rely on agriculture, it was not as heavily impacted by the Holodomor. It was instead a destination for the peasants from the countryside who were experiencing mass starvation, mostly since miners and factory workers got bread rations that the Soviets did not give to the farmers. Those who came and could not find employment in the mines or factories did organise a new collective farm that created the settlement of Novosyrotyne, which is now with Sievierodonetsk. Lysychansk, however, was impacted by the Great Purge, with multiple local officials being targeted, many of whom died. The most notable of the people to die was Ye. Lisnychyi, who was formerly chairman of the Popasna Raion. A street in the settlement was named after him following de-Stalinization.

=== World War II ===
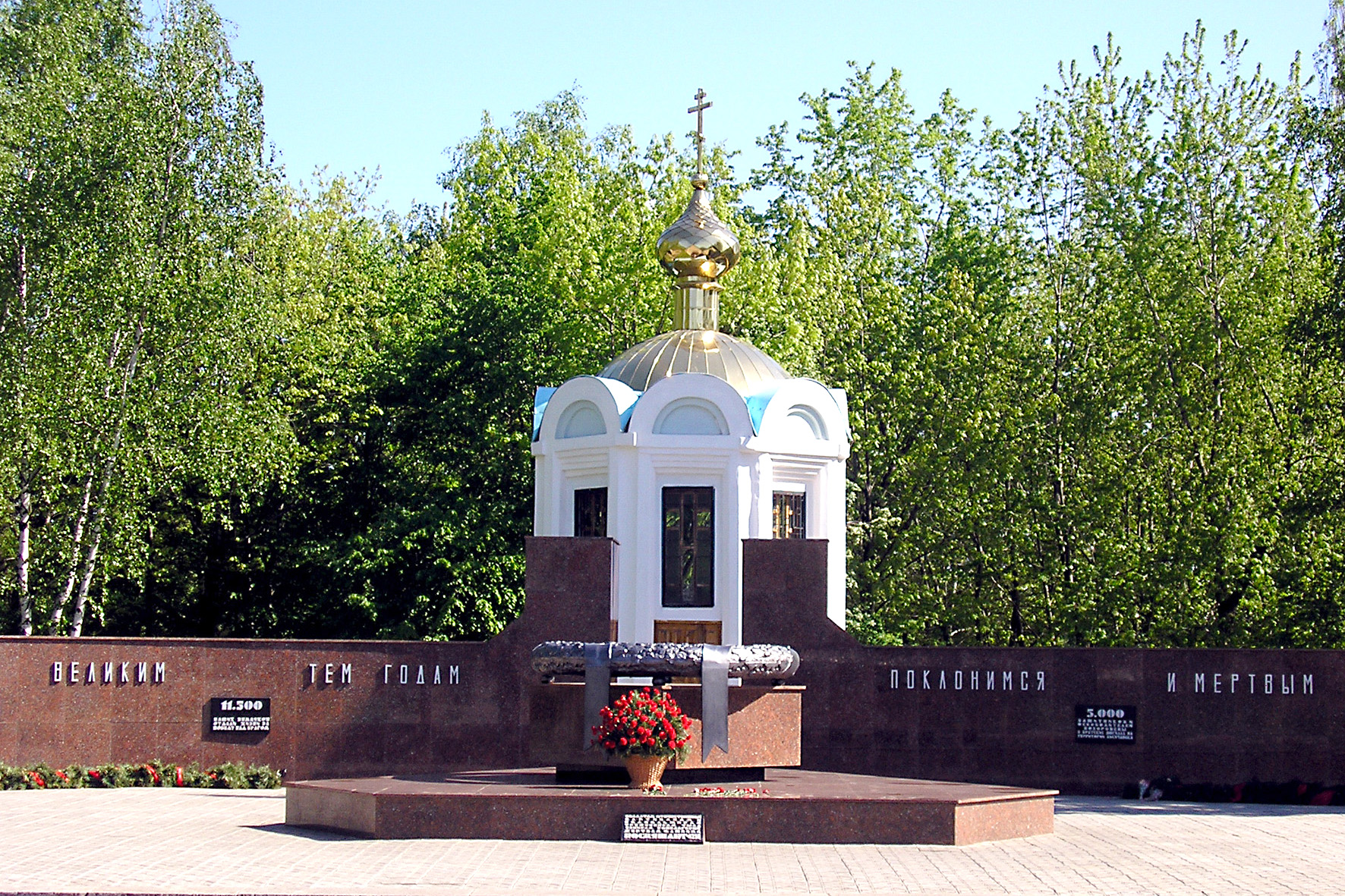
World War II memorial in the city.

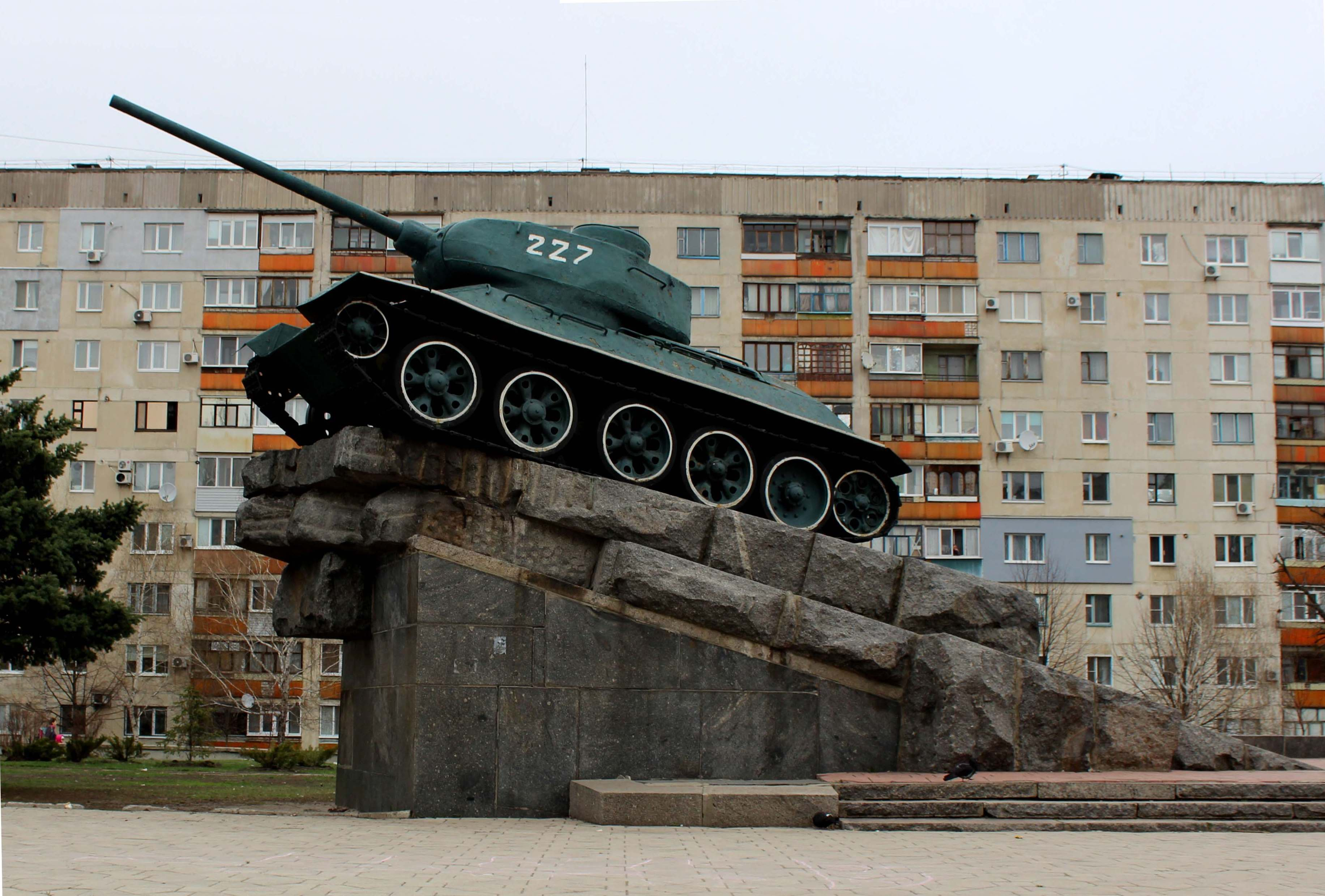
Captured T-34 tank of the Germans in the city.

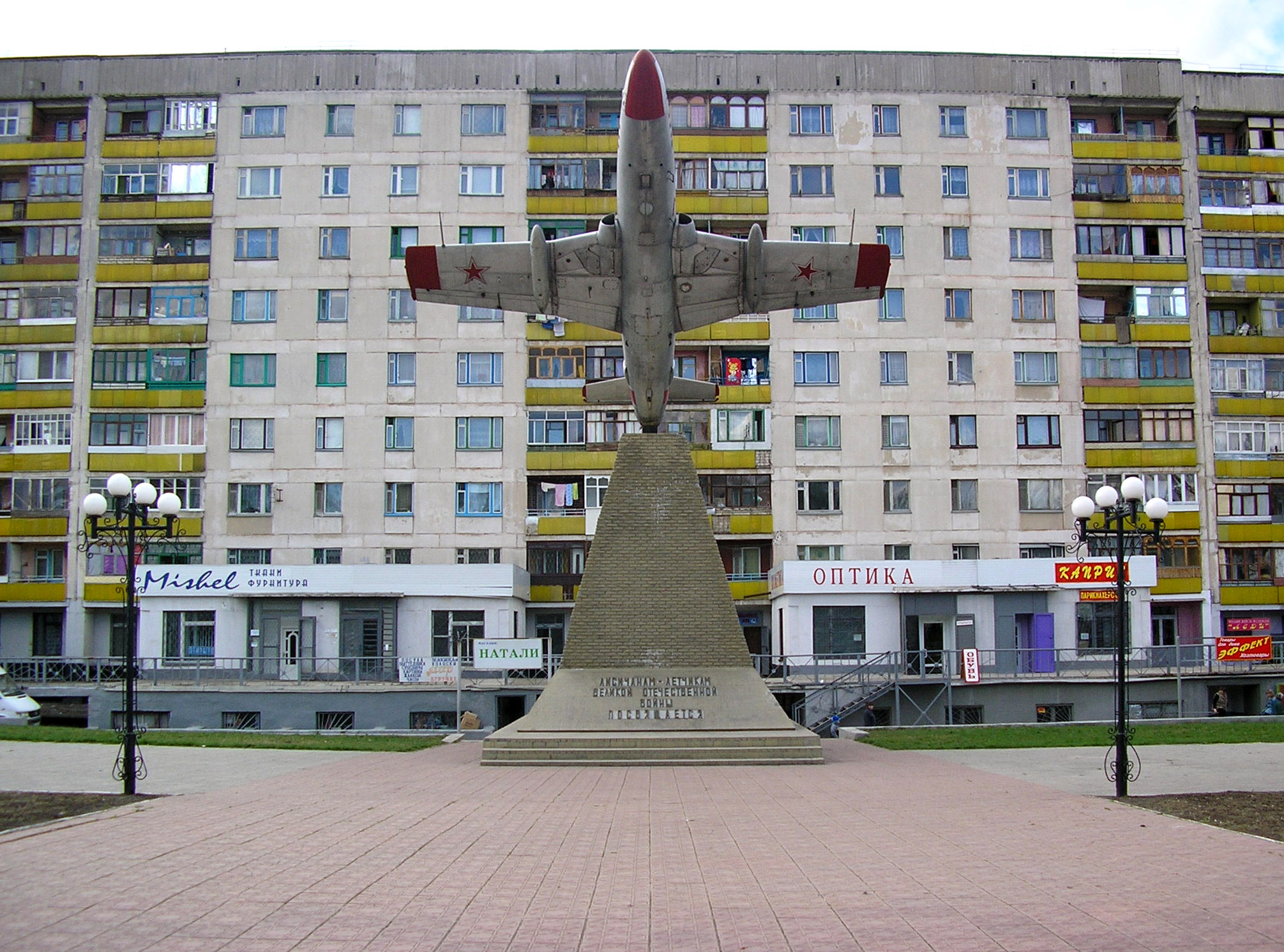
Monument to fighter pilots who liberated the city.

==== Preparations ====
Just before the outbreak of Operation Barbarossa, the city's population was 99,240, and immediately after the war started in the Soviet Union a special school for training future partisans and underground resistance in the city was set up. With the Germans' advancement into eastern Ukraine following the Battle of the Sea of Azov in October 1941, the State Defense Committee (GKO) ordered the immediate evacuation of Lysychansk. They primarily focused on evacuating the coal stations to Chelyabinsk, with the People's Commissariat of Communication Routes of the Soviet Union supplying 145 railcars on 20 October to the department from the railway station in Lysychansk found for the village of Kozyrevo.

==== Battle of Lysychansk ====
After October 1941, the city became part of the defensive sector known as the "Lysychansk perimeter", which was manned by a reserve division of the 37th Army as part of the Southwestern Front. As the Germans reached the outskirts of the city on 18 November 1941, a number of partisan detachments from Dobropillia and Bakhmut were brought in to help with the withdrawal of the Soviet units stationed in the city and in order to keep the Germans at bay on orders of the 49th Cavalry Division. Although reinforcements did not arrive soon, the partisan detachments were successful in temporarily halting the German advance, which at the time was mostly members of the 76th Infantry Division under General Maximilian de Angelis.

The partisan detachments and the 37th Army managed to hold the city for another eight months, in part due to the forestry, until Operation Case Blue began by the Germans. The Germans took the offensive beginning in early July, and managed to break through the line held by 275th Rifle Division on 8–9 July to take Lysychansk and Bilohorivska. A later report on the situation by the Soviets said that in the fighting within Lysychansk on 9 July 1942, members of the 37th Army hardly lost any troops, managing to inflict severe losses on the Germans. On the night of 10 July, the Germans managed to secure a bridgehead, cross the Donets River, and take Lysychansk while pushing back the Soviets to Rubizhne. The Soviets were subsequently incredibly disorganised in their retreat, which took place from 10 to 13 July despite there being almost no combat as they retreated. Due to this disorganisation, the losses were very high - 43 times higher than the actual fighting with Lysychansk. The army highly criticised the prior decision to withdraw rather than stay fighting because of the death toll.

==== Occupation ====
Starting on 10 July 1942, the city was occupied. There was, during the occupation, an underground resistance led by a man known as Arkadii Romanov. The city would remain occupied until 6 February 1943, but was then reoccupied from 3 March to 2 September 1943.

Most of the death toll attributed to the occupation came during the second occupation. Following the second occupation, the Germans confiscated the food and livestock, and in mid-March, they ordered the residents to be expelled from their homes (in total, 2,300 people were deported from Lysychansk). An eyewitness account said they were marched out by armed guards and severely beaten. The most notable of the killings during the second occupation, as identified by a Soviet commission led by Secretary Mezerya, was the killing of 27 civilians who were found on 19 September 1943, including 11 children. The civilians were found in a ravine off Donetska Street, with the bodies being identified by the documents they carried, although only 17 were identified. The civilians were shot at different times prior to being thrown in the ravine: 14 mothers and children were believed to be shot on 25 April 1943 in a garden, and a separate family that was shot inside their apartment was killed at an unknown time. However, the commission also said that no specific German unit commander was responsible for the deaths, and that it was broadly German forces responsible. Another notable killing was of six Red Army soldiers near a drainage pit, who could not be identified, after they were captured during the battle. In total, during the time of occupation, either 470 or 861 people were shot dead in the city.

==== Holocaust ====
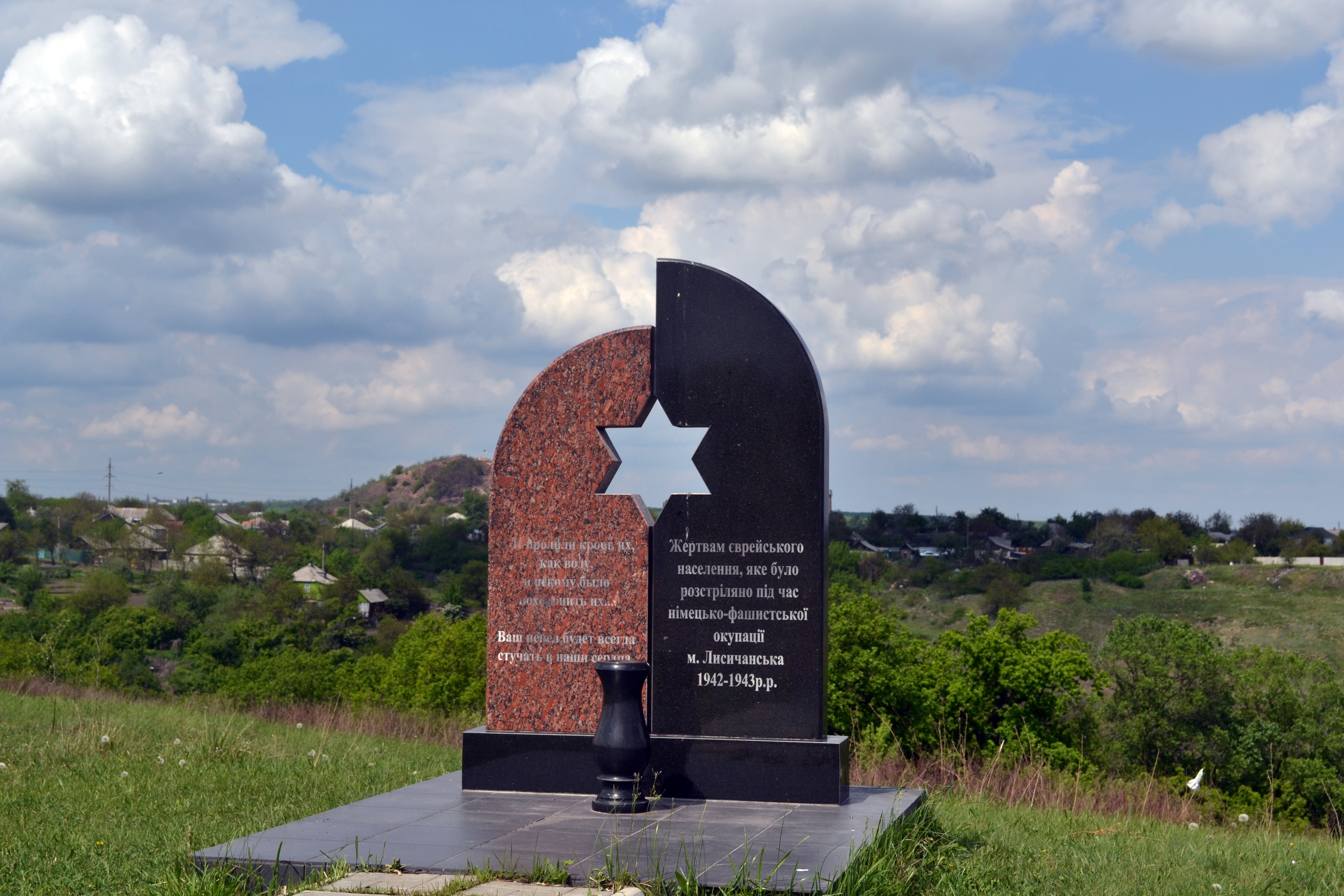
Monument to victims of the Holocaust.

In total, the Germans murdered 37 Jewish families in the city during the Holocaust, many of whom were women, the elderly, and children.

==== Liberation ====
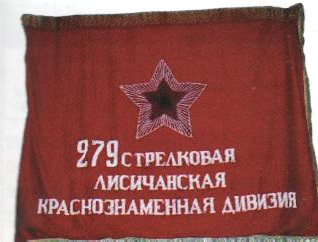
The flag of the 279th Rifle Division. It was given the honorary title of Lysychanska following the liberation of Lysychansk.

During the first liberation, on 19 January 1943 Soviet forces crossed the Donets in order to get to Proletarsk (later incorporated into Lysychansk). The Germans, meanwhile, had built a long line of fortifications through Lysychansk anticipating the Soviet arrival, which included multiple ditches for anti-tank measures and lines of trenches. After a month of battling around the city, the Soviets recaptured the city on 6 February 1943. However, during the German retreat, the Germans had also blown up many of the remaining enterprises in the city. The Soviets did not stay long in the city, as the Germans returned after having brought in new divisions, and they reached the city again on 3 March 1943 when the Soviets withdrew back across the Donets.

The city was liberated the second time on 2 September 1943, which was led by the 279th Rifle Division under Vladimir Potapenko. In honour of this, upon the completion of the Donbas strategic offensive in late September, the unit was given the honorary title of "Lysychanska". It was one of around 20 Soviet divisions that were given an honorific title from places in the Donbas.

=== Post-war ===
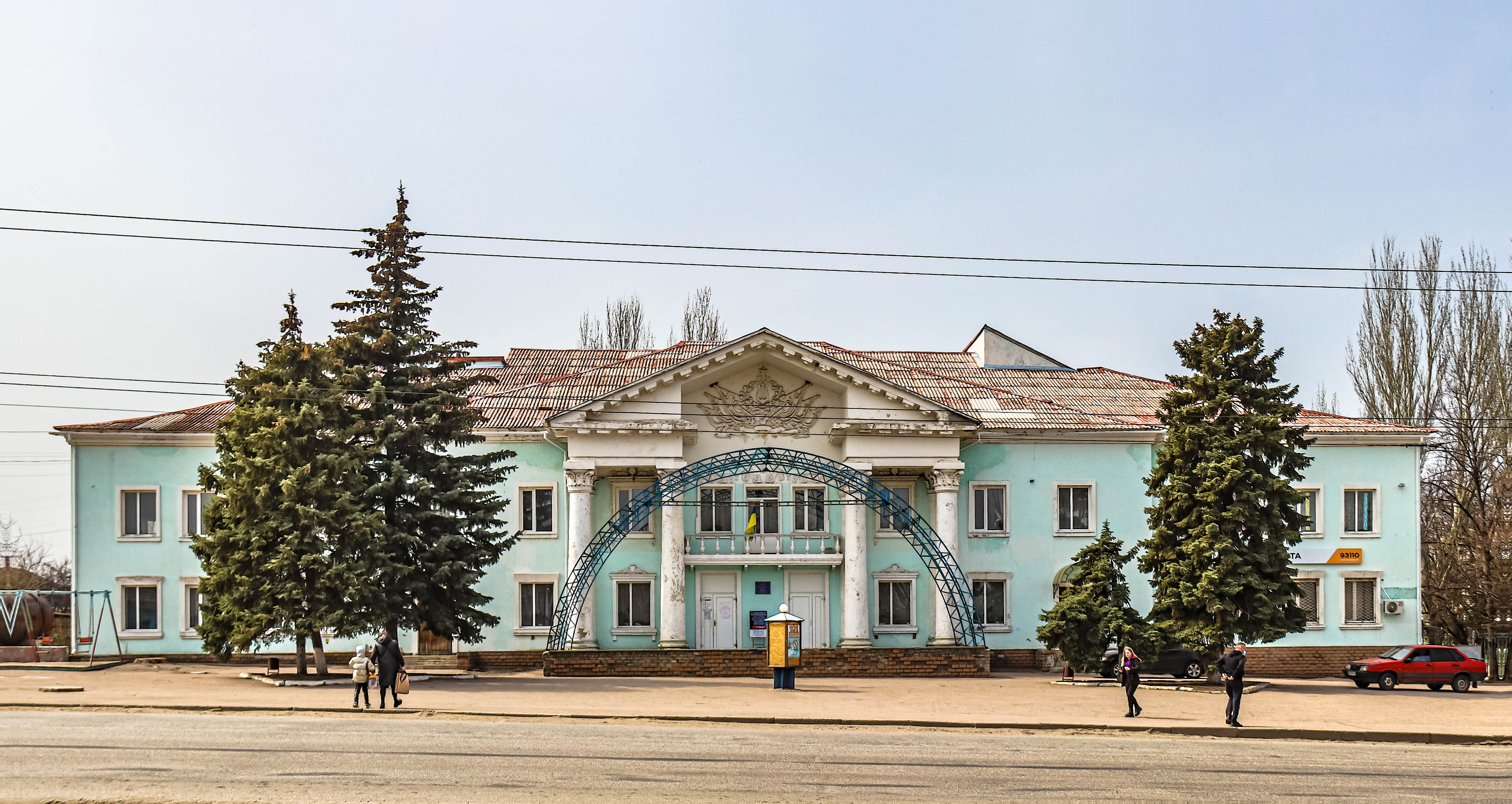
House of Culture built in 1952.

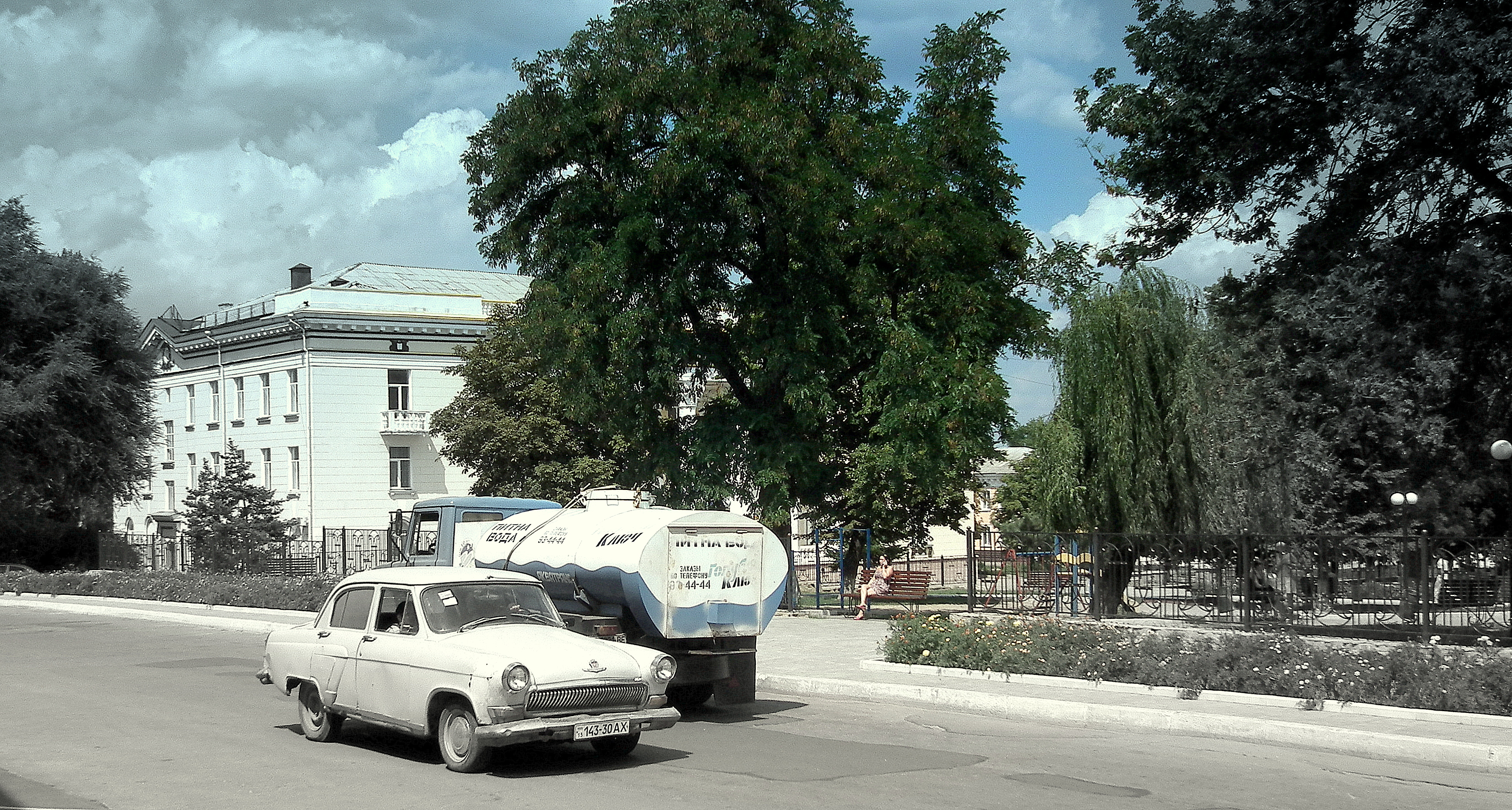
Center of Lysychansk in the 1960s.

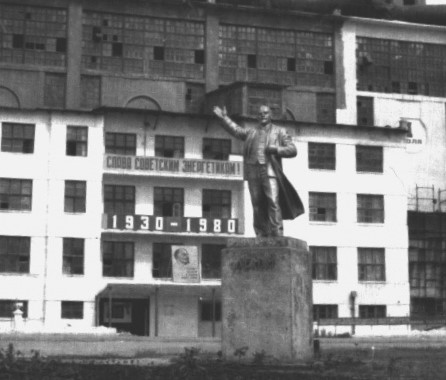
Lysychansk Combined Heat and Power Plant, 1980s.

After liberation, Lysychansk had around 300 residents left in the city, and all the enterprises had been destroyed. The Germans also destroyed all rail lines, bridges, and schools in their retreat. On 12 May 1944, a GKO order signed by Vyacheslav Molotov directed coal supplies for priority shipping to the Lysychansk Glass Factory. The other enterprises in the city evacuated to the Urals, specifically Chelyabinsk, were ordered to be brought back on 1 February 1945. The mines were ordered to be restored to pre-war production by the first quarter of 1946. In terms of the coal industry, the most important industry to the city, around eight small mines were brought back by September 1943, although they had been partially flooded. By 1944, thus increased to 46 mines, with most of the workforce in the mines at the time being women due to the loss of men at the front. By 1949, the city reached the mark of what it was prior to the war, and in fact, in the 1950s, the industry continued to dramatically grow. The soda plant, meanwhile, had roughly 174 million rubles in damage, with the first soda being produced after construction on 9 May 1944. For its quick restoration, the Donsoda plant was awarded an Order of Lenin in 1948. The last important industry in the city was the glass industry, which restoration began on almost immediately. It took until 1947 to return to pre-war levels. By 1953, the city's population had reached 27,800.

Throughout the late 1950s, there were some discussions among the Soviets about possibly merging Lysychansk, Sievierodonetsk, and Rubizhne into a singular city which would be known as "Mendeleev" after Dmitri Mendeleev. This idea never panned out, and instead the area became an urban agglomeration. Throughout the mid-1960s, Lysychansk's borders were also changed. In 1962, the city of Sievierodonetsk, which started as a village serving a chemical plant on the outskirts of Lysychansk, branched off from Lysychansk and became its own independent city. That same year, after administrative restructuring, the city became the administrative centre of the new Lysychansk Raion. The city was the administrative centre until 1977, when the raion was renamed back to Popasna and the administrative centre was moved to Popasna also. In 1963, the towns of Novodruzhesk and Pryvillia were included in the city limits of Lysychansk and became cities. In 1965, Lysychansk incorporated the settlements of Verkhnie and Proletarske. As the industry also rapidly grew in the city, the population of the city crossed the 100,000 mark in 1970. The Lysychansk Oil Refinery was opened in the city in 1979, which quickly became one of the largest refineries in Ukraine, divesting from the previous industries in the city. To meet the refinery's needs, a bridge was also built to connect it to Sievierodonetsk. Lysychansk's population reached a peak of 127,000 in 1989, right before the collapse of the Soviet Union.

== Independent Ukraine ==
=== 1990s and 2000s ===
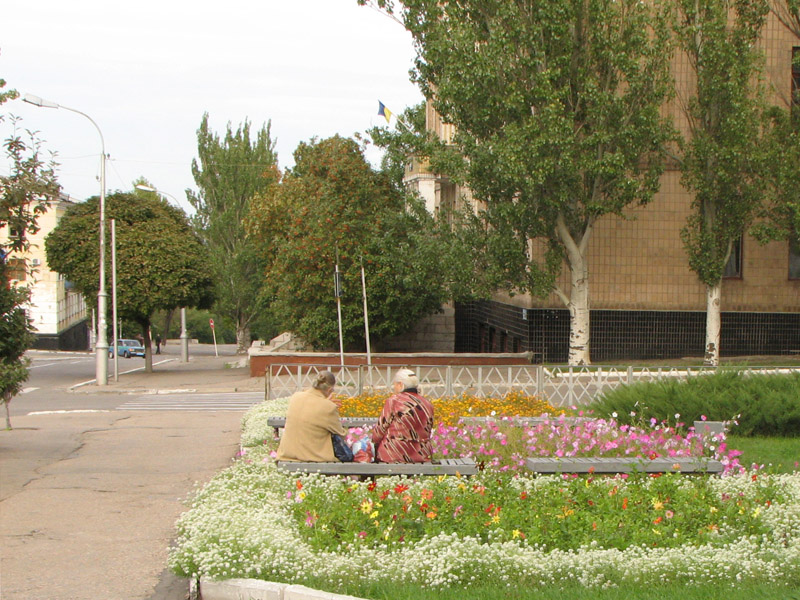
Lysychansk in 2006.

After the collapse of the Soviet Union, the city became part of Ukraine in 1991. After independence, the industry of the city was almost entirely privatised. In a May 1995 decree, dozens of enterprises in the city underwent privatisation, including the soda factory and the oil refinery. Not only this, but the educational infrastructure was also changed from the Soviet era. A 1997 decree liquidated the pedagogical school in the city in favour of making it a branch of Luhansk University, although a new branch of the Lysychansk Medical School was also opened up nearby in Kreminna. During this time, the city started to be rapidly depopulated as people moved away.

Throughout the 2000s, most of the city's industries were bought out by Russian-linked companies, such as the oil refinery and the soda plant. Subsequently, in the early 2010s, the city's historical enterprises almost all collapsed. The first to go with was the rubber products factory on 7 July 2011, after debt that was acquired in the early 2000s under Oleksandr Yefremov after the most profitable production lines were seized for debt repayment. Months later, on 25 October 2011, the historic soda plant was also declared bankrupt. Lastly, the oil refinery was shut down for an indefinite period in March 2012, which, according to TNK-BP was due to unprofitability. Rosneft bought out the plant in 2012 afterwards and held it as a reserve, although no refining operations continued.

=== Euromaidan and War in Donbas ===
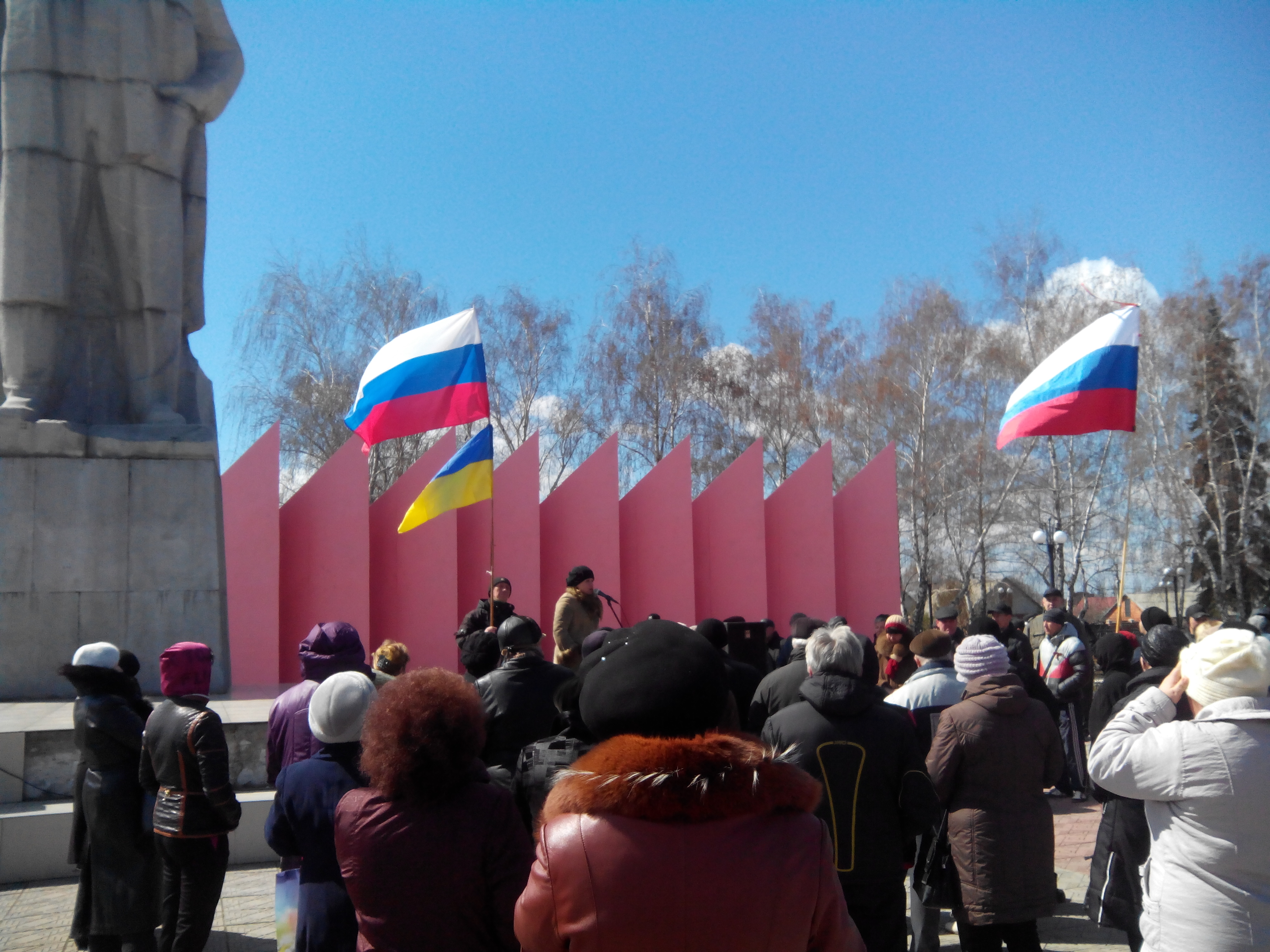
Pro-Russian rally in Lysychansk in April 2014.

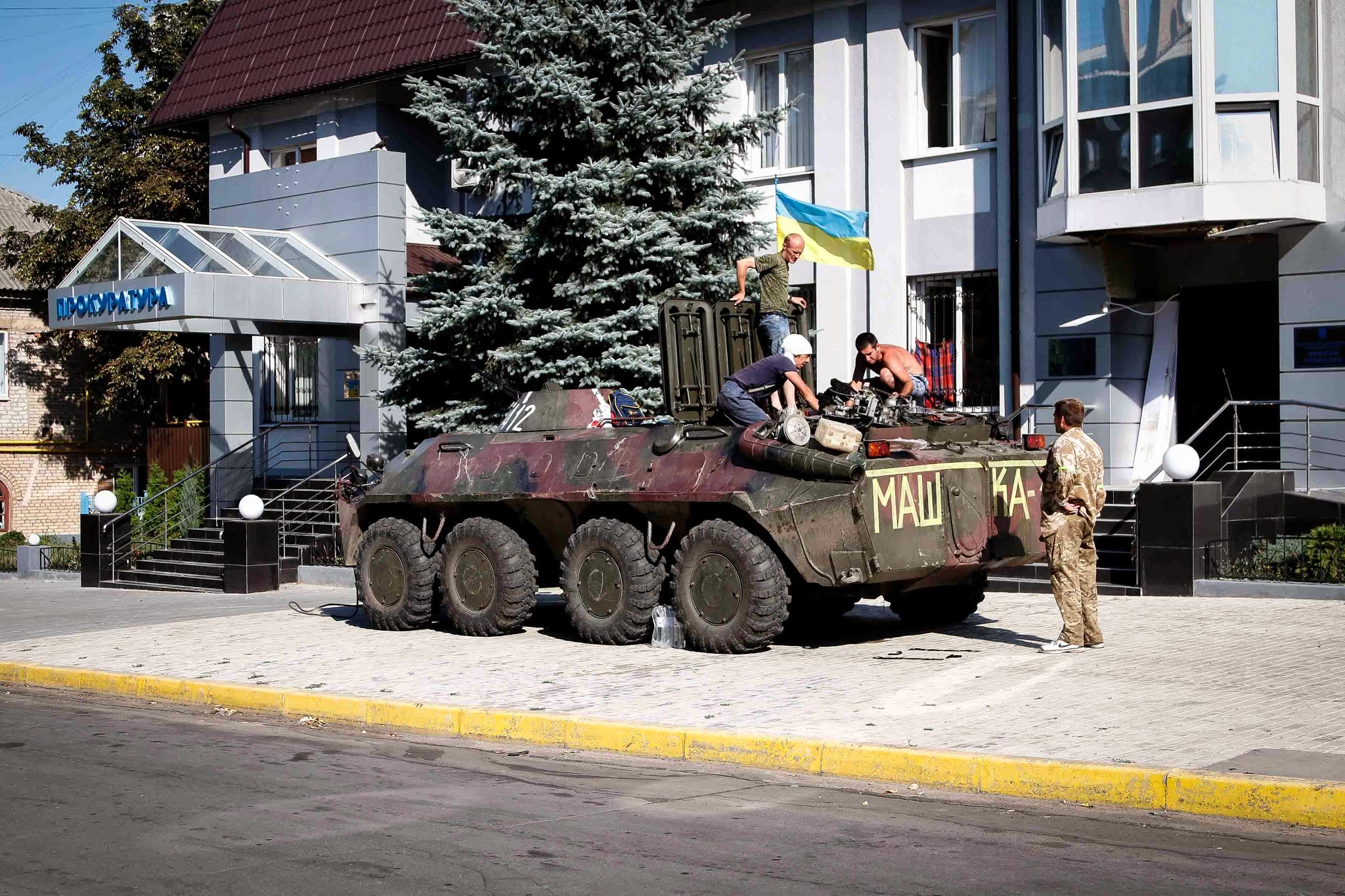
A tank entering Lysychansk in July 2014.

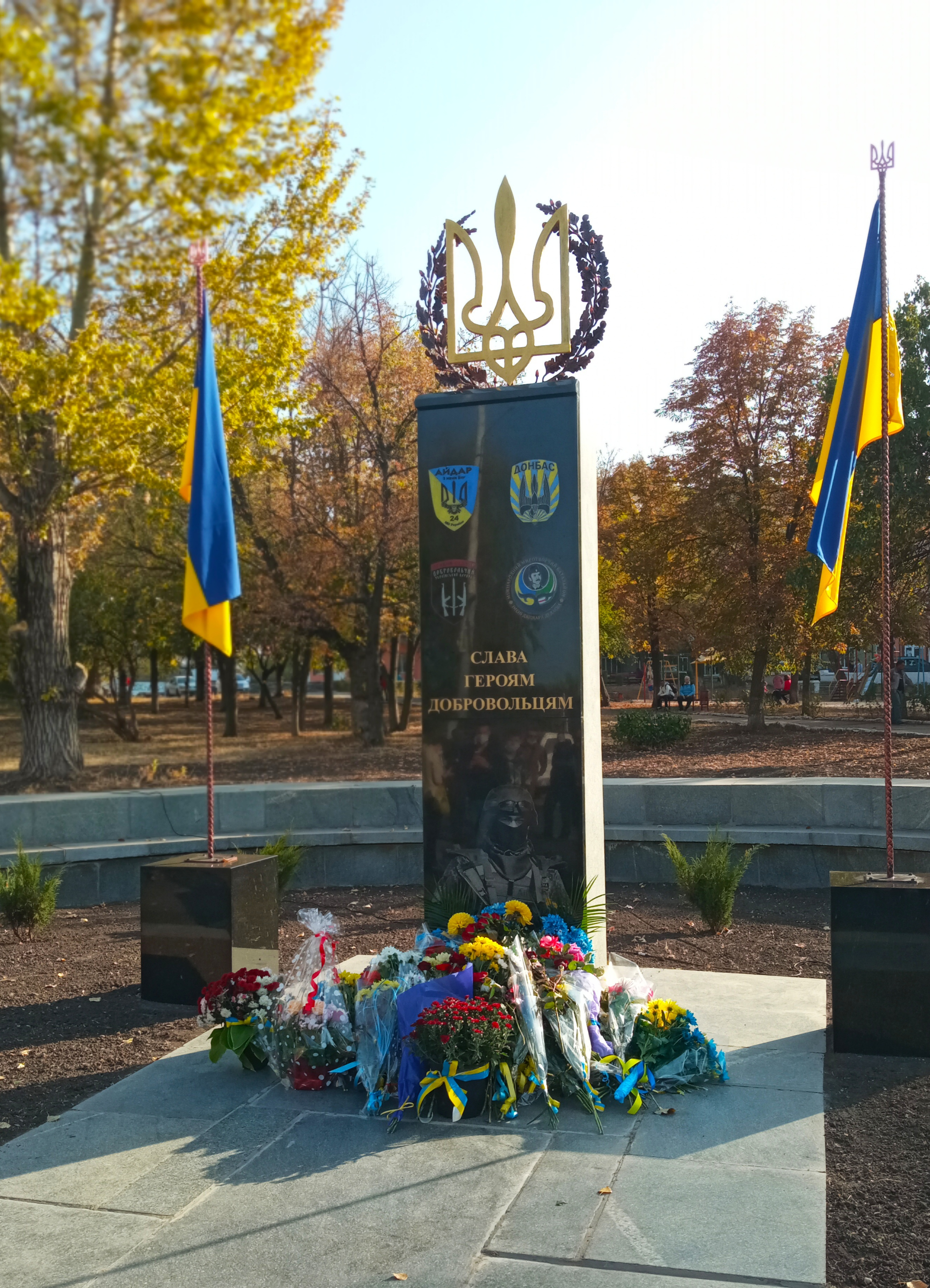
Monument to those who fought in the ATO liberating the city.

During the events of Euromaidan, on 23 February 2014, an unidentified resident pulled down the statue of Vladimir Lenin near the Palace of Culture. In response, pro-Russian Anti-Maidan organisers claimed that a "busload of Banderites" was going to head to the city and topple the remaining Communist-era statues. They formed self-defense squads shortly thereafter, tasked with guarding the Lenin monuments in the city. The first pro-Russian rally was held the next month on 1 March 2014. During the rally, according to eyewitnesses, the participants called for separation from Ukraine and an "independent republic" and began tearing down Ukrainian flags in the city. As the pro-Russian unrest in Ukraine heightened elsewhere in Luhansk Oblast throughout April, the police in Lysychansk organised joint patrols to shut down separatism and stationed units to patrol the roads.

Despite this, the police were not able to hold the city, and in April 2014, the city was captured by pro-Russian separatists - most of whom were affiliated with the so-called "Cossack National Guard of the All-Great Don Army named after Platov" - who then annexed the city into the pro-Russian, self-declared Luhansk People's Republic. After the group captured the city, they then implemented curfew and started detaining at least five people, whom they moved out to the SBU's Luhansk Oblast office, the military enlistment office, and the glass factory. On 8 May, the separatists cut off all Ukrainian television and began to set up checkpoints around the city to enter it. They held the 2014 Donbas status referendums in the city on 11 May, in which, according to the unrecognised results, the city formally became part of the LPR. The city would remain fully occupied until July, with residents recalling that tanks regularly moved down the streets during this time, and kidnappings became frequent.

In July 2014, as part of the Anti-terrorist Operation Zone, Ukrainian forces began to mount a counteroffensive aimed at regaining the triangle of cities of Rubizhne, Sievierodonetsk, and Lysychansk. Shelling became frequent during this time, especially an 18 July shelling, which ignited a fire at the oil refinery and burned many apartments. A BBC account described Ukrainian air strikes also hitting military targets near Lysychansk on 14 July, while a Ukrainian military transport plane was shot down. Ukrainian forces, however, broke through the triangle and on 21 July captured Rubizhne and Sievierodonetsk on 22 July, with heavy fighting for Lysychansk beginning that same night they took Sievierodonetsk. According to residents, the separatists deliberately shelled residential districts during the fighting to attempt to drum up local support in a false flag operation. Other residents fled across the Donets to the captured city of Sievierodonetsk, with a hotel being temporarily converted for retreating people. There was intense street fighting during the capture, with mortar fire being common around the city's edges.

Ukrainians finally managed to break through on the morning of 24 July, consisting of soldiers of the Donbas Battalion and the 24th Mechanized Brigade through the northern districts. After ambushes, several hours of urban combat began, until the 24th Mechanized Brigade pushed forward and broke the line. The Ukrainian flag was raised that same day at either 20:30 or 22:20. After the flag was raised, the separatists blew up the bridge connecting Sievierodonetsk and Lysychansk and fled south to Luhansk. In total, 15 Ukrainian soldiers were killed of the estimated 400 that took Lysychansk. A later SBU report accused multiple separatists of being Russian nationals who had received sabotage training in Rostov Oblast. They were linked to a group known as "Sibiryaki". They were said to be aided by local militants from the Donbas. President Petro Poroshenko commented on the battle, calling it as difficult because of the defensive rings around the city. However, the capture of the city was considered a strong positive development for the rest of Luhansk Oblast.

=== Recovery ===
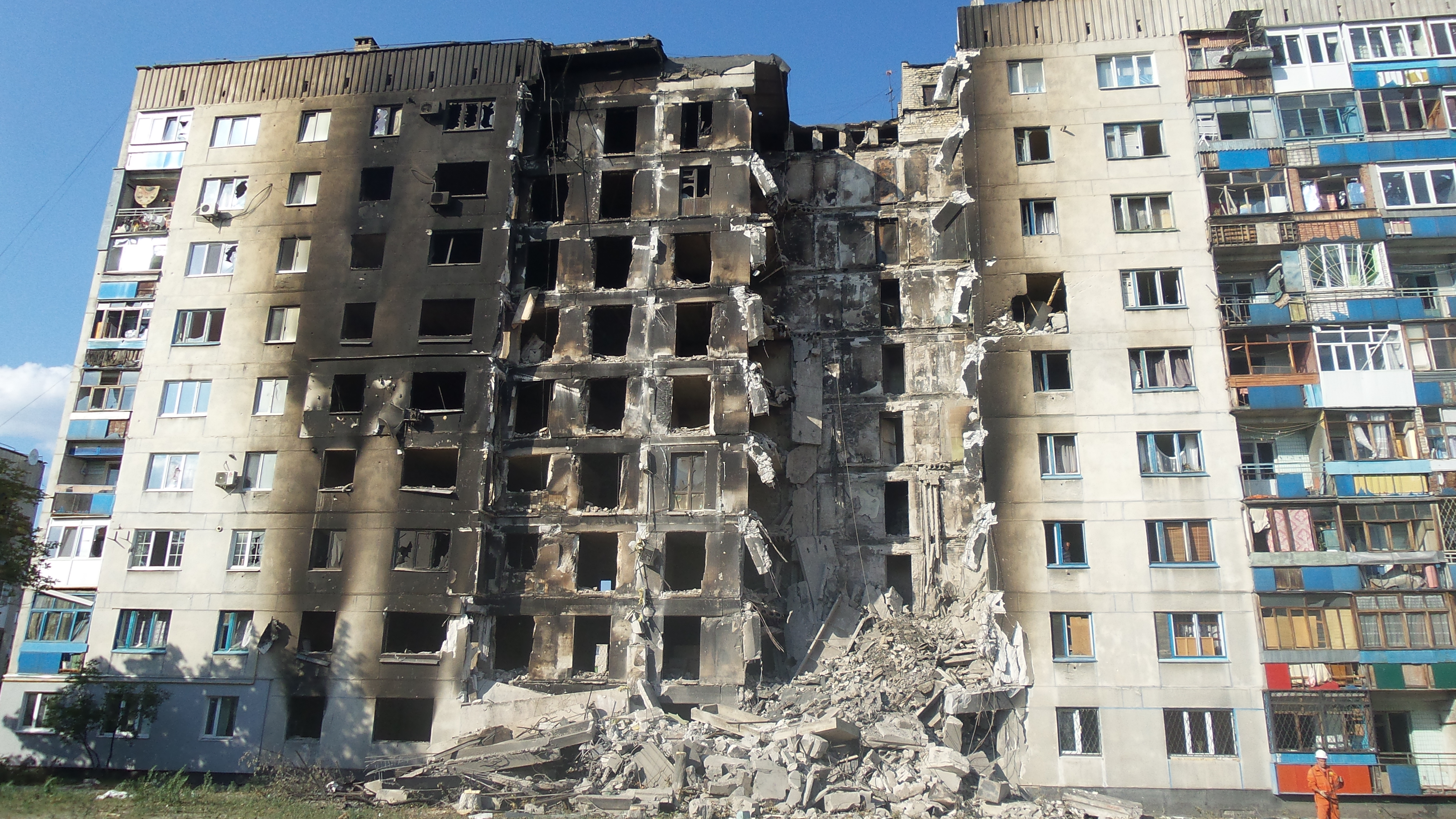
An apartment building destroyed in the city in the aftermath.

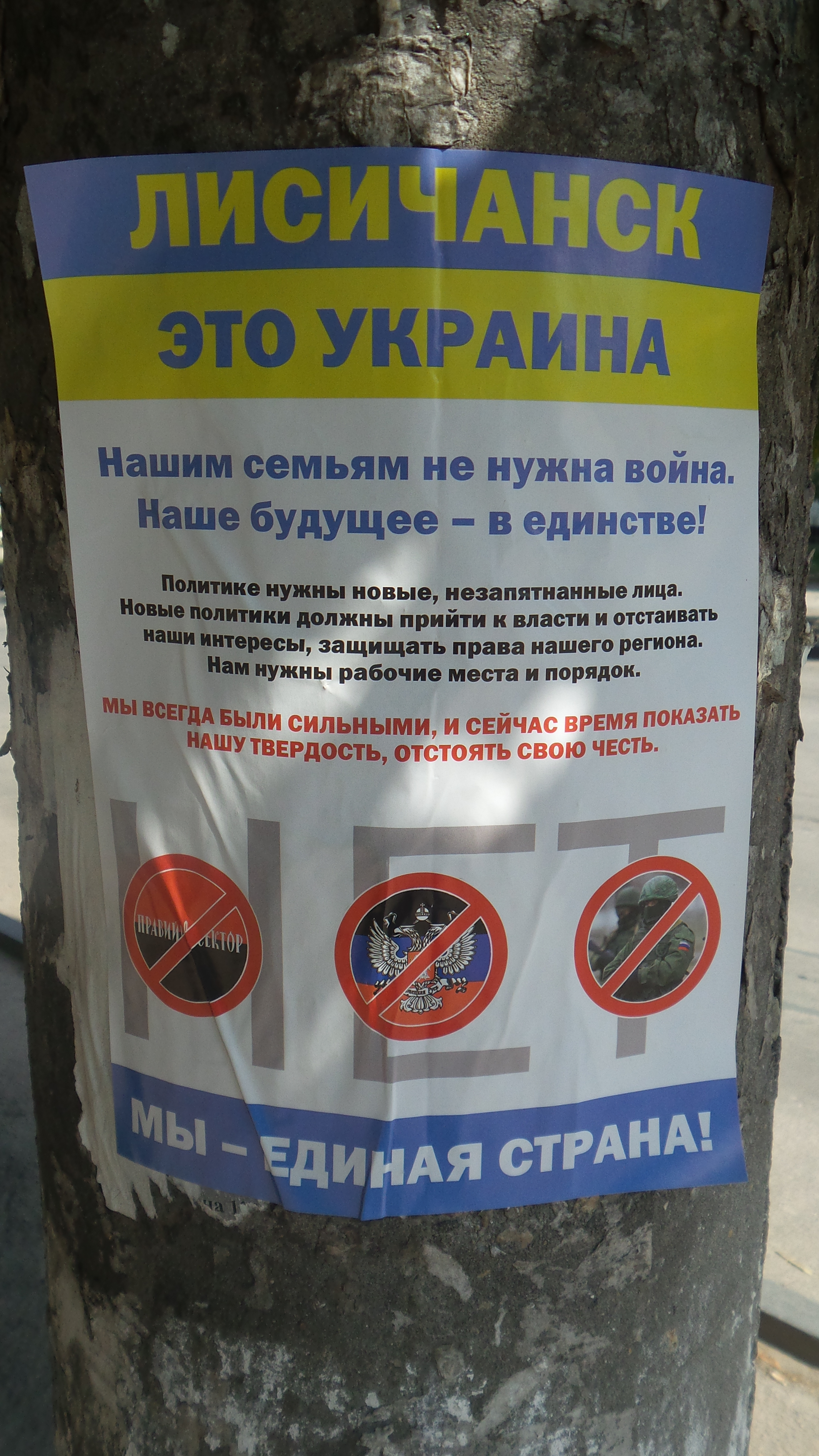
Flyers posted around Lysychansk after liberation. It says "Lysychansk is Ukraine, we are one country."

After liberation, aid points were set up throughout the city as part of the "7th Line" volunteer project. An ATO representative at the time said the main problem was that because most of the housing was destroyed, they needed glass and roofing materials, but they were in shortage. On 9 August 2014, the national police began identifying individuals who had worked with the separatists and had begun detaining them, and the police and the courts resumed. In the aftermath, there had to be large-scale Ukrainian humanitarian aid sent from Kyiv, Kharkiv, and Dnipro. Another main problem was the heavy mine contamination. Multiple people were injured in the city by mines, although in January 2018 the United States began tripling its aid for demining efforts. The Red Cross and local authorities quickly worked on fixing the city's hospital of Ambulatory Clinic No. 3, which had more than 1,400 square meters of damage.

In August 2015, the Japanese government also provided a large amount of aid for Luhansk Oblast, which, among others, would go to Lysychansk's recovery. There was also a volunteer platform, "Building Ukraine Together," in the city. Donbas SOS also worked in the city helping with pensions, which were described as being overwhelmed despite being modernised and well-organised. That same year, in October, local council elections were finally held again, but they were invalidated due to an excessive number of errors, although they were later deemed to be valid and the statement was refuted. A city-level military-civil administration that had been set up in December 2015 due to the city's proximity to the demarcation line was briefly put in place during this time then shortly thereafter removed. As the year rolled into 2016, more than 25 million hryvnias were given in compensation to over 250 people displaced from the destroyed apartment building No. 17. Compensation was 4,600 hryvnias per square meter of damaged housing. After the destruction of the apartment, people had to live in temporary housing or the 15 replacement apartments.

In August, a report was done by the Atlantic Council on how the city felt after three years of liberation. According to the report, it was estimated that 20% were pro-Ukrainian, 30-40% were pro-Russian, and the rest felt indifferent, in large part due to the mass destruction and economic depression since the closure of businesses in the early 2010s. In 2018, multiple train routes connecting to Lysychansk were finally returned, and a new urban culture was created, funded partly by USAID.

During the COVID-19 pandemic, the city fell within the "red zone" classification, and monitoring showed that multiple hospitals, including Lysychansk's, were chronically understaffed with both people and equipment. In July 2020, as the pandemic continued, Volodymyr Zelenskyy signed a decree reestablishing the military-civil administration which had been dissolved in 2016 by Pereshenko. Due to this, elections were ultimately canceled in Lysychansk again (there had been one held in 2019). That same year, during administrative reform, the city was made the centre of the Lysychansk urban hromada, transferred to the newly created Sievierodonetsk Raion, and had its designation as a city of regional significance removed (the designation was abolished entirely nationwide). In December, the Ministry for Reintegration of Temporarily Occupied Territories also finally implemented a new compensation program for war-destroyed housing again. In 2021, per decree again by Zelenskyy, the status of military administration was again liquidated.

=== 2022 Russian invasion of Ukraine ===
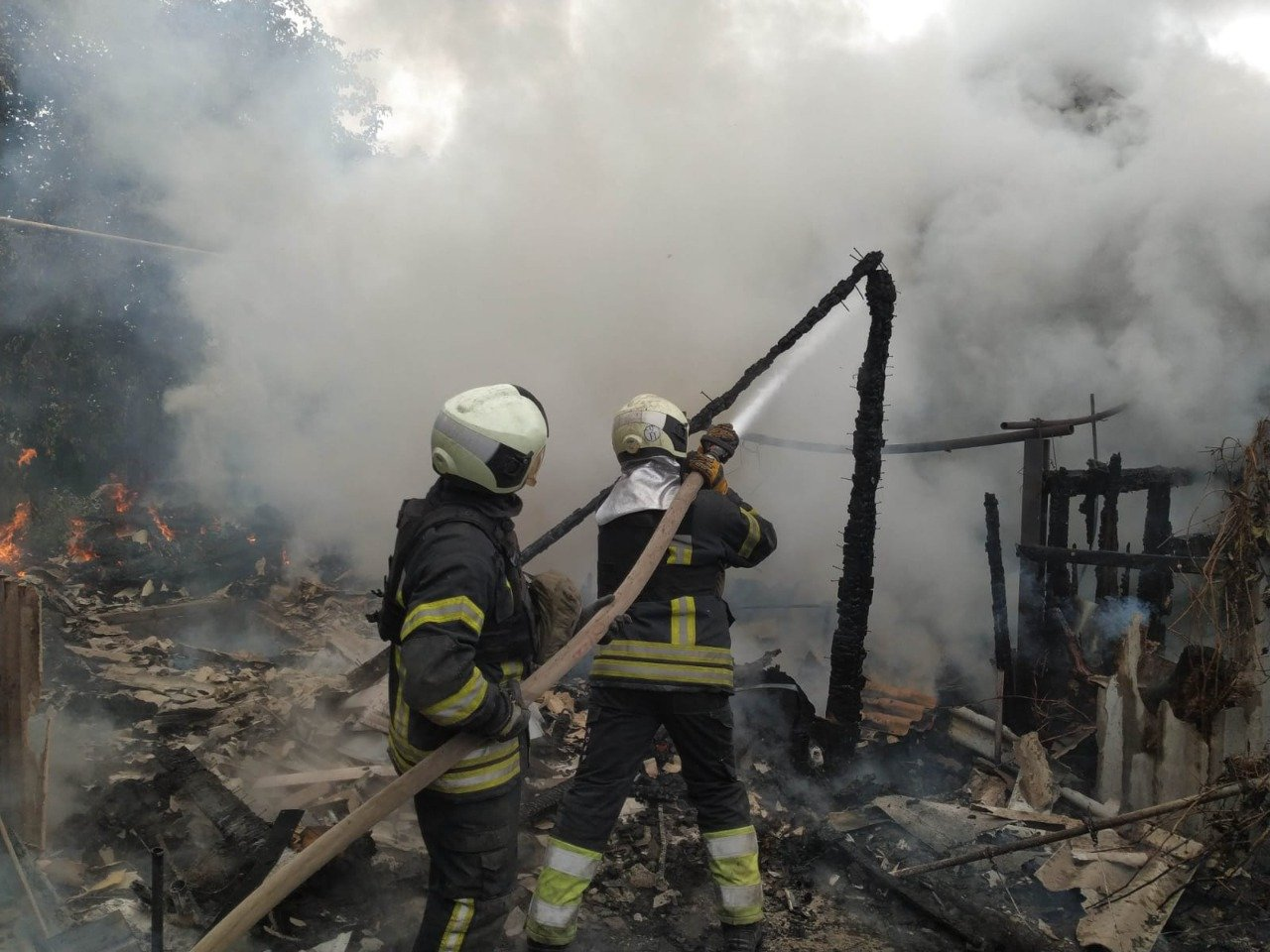
Ukrainian firefighters dousing flames following Russian strikes, July 2022.

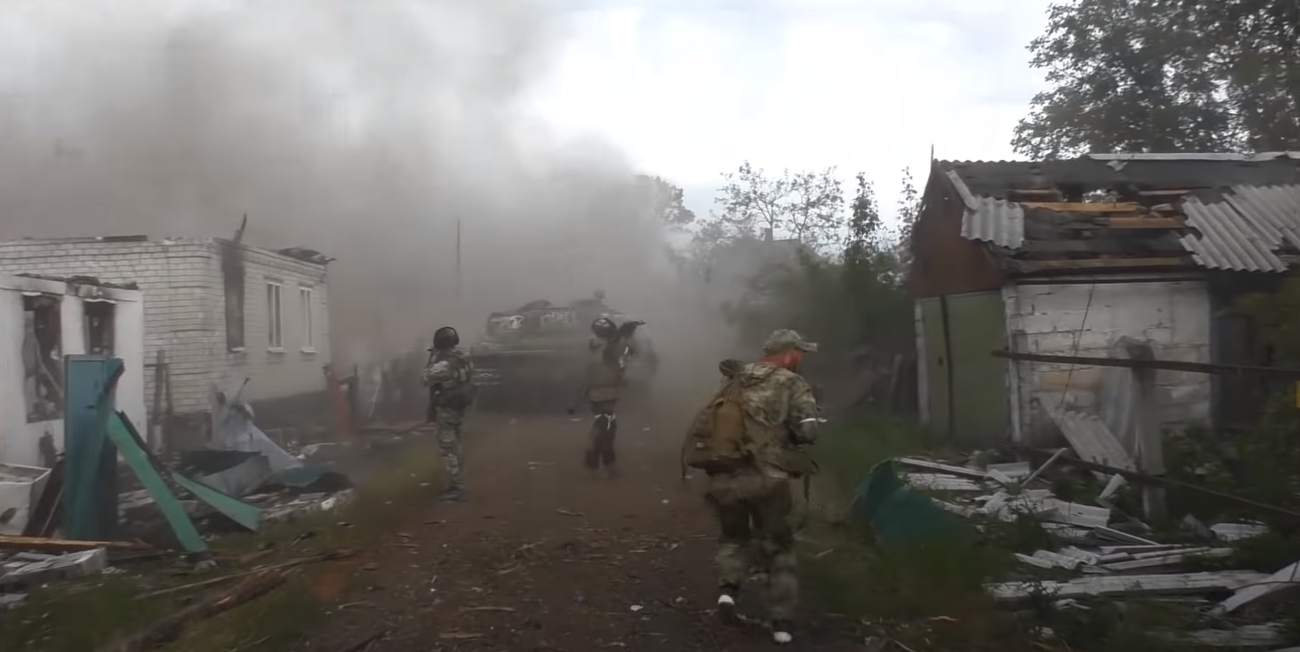
Pro-Russian forces advance towards Lysychansk, June 2022

During the Russian invasion of Ukraine, Lysychansk came under heavy shelling from the Russian military. Some of the most intense strikes occurred late in March 2022, which destroyed dozens of buildings and caused civilian casualties. On 9 May 2022, Russian troops attempted to cross over the Seversky Donets river with a temporary pontoon bridge near Bilohorivka. Ukrainian forces anticipated this approach, monitored the bridge construction, bombing the bridge and Russian vehicles who already crossed resulting in severe Russian losses. Russia made several such attempts, many of which were neutralized by Ukrainian forces.

After the Russian capture of Sievierodenetsk, Lysychansk became the last major city in the Luhansk Oblast under Ukrainian control. On 26 June, TASS reported that Russian forces entered the city from five directions. On 27 June, the CNN reported that civilians in Lysychansk have been urged to leave immediately, as Russian forces gain ground in the city.

On 2 July 2022, reports of Ukrainian troops withdrawing from the city and Russian forces moving in were supported by multiple videos from Ramzan Kadyrov's 141st Special Motorized Regiment declaring victory in front of the City Council of Lysychansk. "After heavy fighting for Lysychansk, the defence forces of Ukraine were forced to withdraw from their occupied positions and lines," the army general staff said. Earlier Russia's Defence Minister Sergei Shoigu said his forces had captured Lysychansk and taken full control of Luhansk region. Ukraine's troops were outgunned there. The general staff said that "in order to preserve the lives of Ukrainian defenders, a decision was made to withdraw".

According to reports after the capture, only at most 12,000 remained in the city. There was no telephone service, water, or electricity within the city. The damage to the city was large, but not as bad as in nearby Sievierodonetsk because most of the fighting was not within the central parts of the city. Among the most notable buildings destroyed were the Lysychansk State Mining and Industrial College. On 3 February 2024, a Ukrainian missile strike hit the city. Russian-installed authorities said 28 people were killed, including multiple high-ranking officials, such as Aleksei Poteleshchenko, who was the Emergency Situations Minister, and two deputies of the Russian-installed municipal district of Lysychansk. After the city's capture, Lysychansk frequently remained without basic services, as neither mobile nor internet service worked within the city as of May 2025. That same year, it was reported that the Russian authorities had begun to confiscate the property of those who had fled to Ukrainian-held cities.

== Sources ==
- Лопатин, H.B. (1960). У колыбели Донбасса. Луганское областное издательство.
