= Shapoval =

Shapoval (Ukrainian: Шаповал, pronounced [ʃɐpoˈwɑl]) is an occupational surname of East Slavic-language origin that means 'maker of felt hats'. Notable people with the surname include:

- Dmytro Shapoval (born 1996), Ukrainian footballer
- Maksym Shapoval (1978–2017), Ukrainian military officer
- Mykola Shapoval (1886–1948), Ukrainian general
- Oleksandr Shapoval (1975–2022), Ukrainian ballet dancer
- Serhiy Shapoval (born 1990), Ukrainian footballer
- Viktor Shapoval (born 1979), Ukrainian high jumper
- Vladyslav Shapoval (born 1995), Ukrainian football player
- Volodymyr Shapoval (born 1934), Ukrainian and Soviet government official
- Yevhen Shapoval (born 1987), Ukrainian football defender

== See also ==
- Shapovalov/Shapovalova
- Shapovalenko
