= Roman Shapovalov =

Russian footballer

Personal information
- Full name: Roman Borisovich Shapovalov
- Date of birth: 23 January 1981 (age 45)
- Place of birth: Krasnodar, Russian SFSR
- Height: 1.83 m (6 ft 0 in)
- Position: Midfielder

Senior career*
Years	Team	Apps	(Gls)
1997–1998	FC Vagonnik Krasnodar		
1999–2003	FC Dynamo Moscow	10	(0)
1999–2000	→ FC Dynamo-d Moscow (loans)	48	(4)
2004	FC Kuban Krasnodar	0	(0)
2005	FC Petrotrest St. Petersburg	18	(1)
2006–2008	FC GNS-Spartak Krasnodar		
2009	FC Tuapse Tuapsinskiy Raion		

International career
2000	Russia U-21	3	(0)
- * Club domestic league appearances and goals

Roman Borisovich Shapovalov (Russian: Роман Борисович Шаповалов; born 23 January 1981) is a Russian former football player.
