= Rohove, Luhansk Oblast =

Village in Luhansk Oblast, Ukraine

Rohove Рогове
- Village
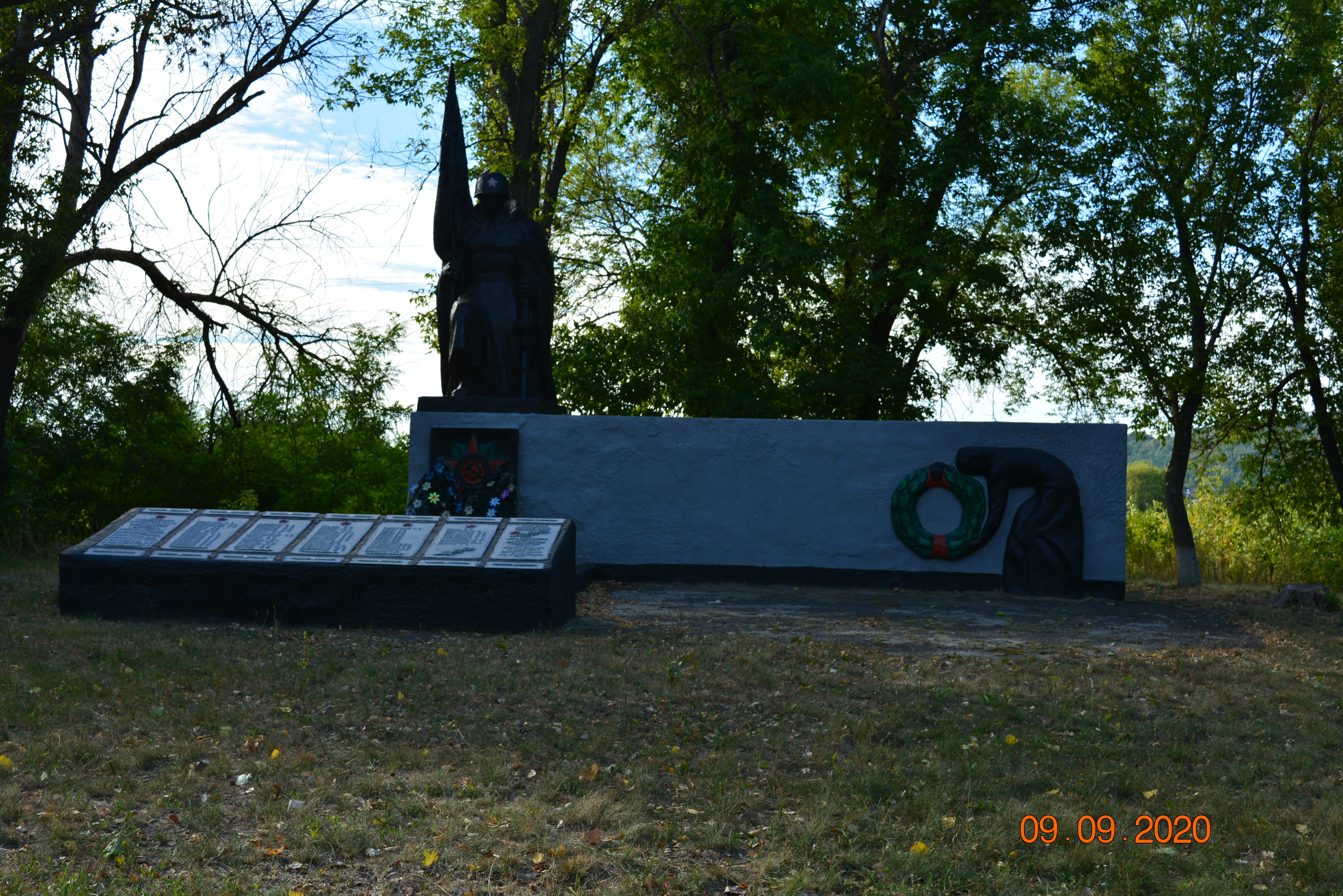
- A WWII mass grave of Soviet soldiers and a memorial sign in honour of villagers-veterans
- Interactive map of Rohove
- Location of Rohove within Ukraine Rohove (Ukraine)
- Coordinates: 49.623889°N 39.041111°E
- Country: Ukraine
- Oblast: Luhansk Oblast
- Raion: Novopskov Raion
- Hromada: Novopskov settlement hromada
- Founded: 1732

Area
  - Total: 5.65 km^{2} (2.18 sq mi)
- Elevation: 68 m (223 ft)

Population (2001 census)
  - Total: 701
  - Density: 124/km^{2} (321/sq mi)
- Time zone: UTC+2 (EET)
  - Summer (DST): UTC+3 (EEST)
- Postal code: 92341
- Area code: +380 6463

Rohove (Ukrainian: Рогове; Russian: Рогово, romanized: Rogovo) is a village in Starobilsk Raion in Luhansk Oblast of eastern Ukraine, located 110.00 kilometres (68.35 mi) north by west (NbW) of the centre of Luhansk city. It forms part of the Novopskov settlement hromada, one of the hromadas of Ukraine.

It has been under Russian occupation since the start of the Russian invasion of Ukraine in 2022. The nearby (Rogovo) firing range has been used by occupational authorities and been hit by Ukrainian missile strikes.

== Demographics ==
As of the 2001 Ukrainian census, the settlement had 701 inhabitants. Their native languages were 95.33% Ukrainian, 4.39% Russian and 0.14% Belarusian.

Native languages in Rohove
	percent
Ukrainian	95.33%
Russian	4.39%
Belarusian	0.14%
others	0.14%
