= Zalisne =

Zalisne (Ukrainian: Залісне), where Ukrainian: За means behind and Ukrainian: ліс a forest, may refer to several places in Ukraine:

- Zalisne, Crimea
- Zalisne, Donetsk Oblast
- Zalisne, Luhansk Oblast
- Zalisne, Sumy Oblast
