= Russia–Ukraine border =

International border In Europe

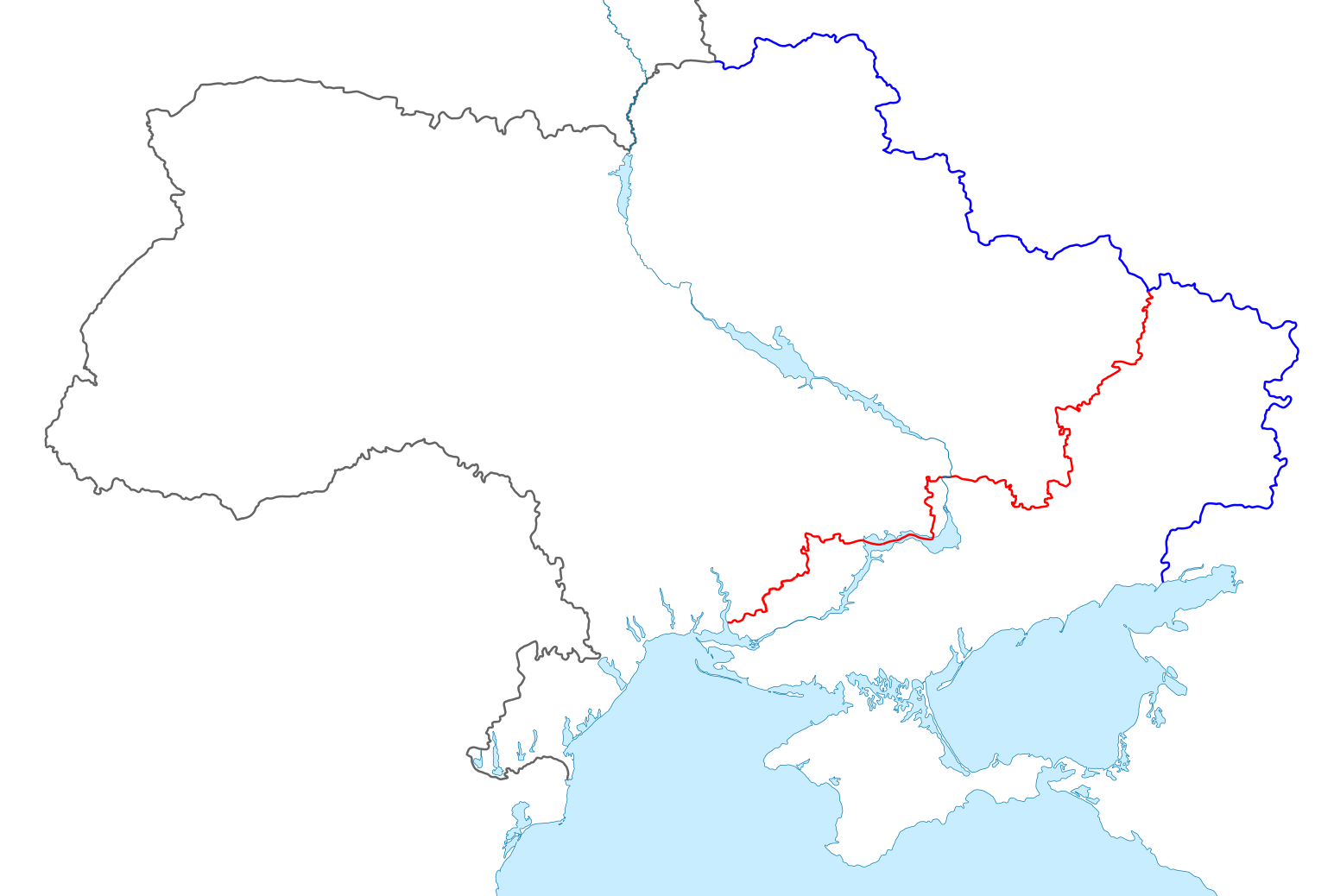
- Map showing state border between Ukraine and Russia. Blue line indicates border line agreed through 2003 bilateral Treaty on the Russian–Ukrainian border. Red line indicates the border claimed by Russia after the annexation of Crimea in 2014 and Russian annexation of Donetsk, Kherson, Luhansk and Zaporizhzhia oblasts in 2022.

Characteristics
- Entities: Russia; Ukraine
- Length: 1,925.8 kilometres (1,196.6 mi) (de jure)

History
- Established: 1917 (internal), 1918 (international); First Universal of the Ukrainian Central Rada, Fourth Universal of the Ukrainian Central Rada
- Current shape: 1954 (internal), 1991 (internationally recognized), 2022 (according to Russia), undecided (de facto); 1954 transfer of Crimea, Declaration of Independence of Ukraine, Russian annexation of southeastern Ukraine
- Notes: Ongoing Russo-Ukrainian war with parts of Ukraine occupied and illegally annexed by Russia

Border markers of Ukraine (left) and the Russian Federation (right)

The Russia–Ukraine border is the de jure international boundary between Russia and Ukraine. Over land, the border spans five Russian oblasts and five Ukrainian oblasts. Due to the ongoing Russo-Ukrainian War, which began in early 2014, the de facto border between Russia and Ukraine is different from the legal border recognized by the United Nations. As of 2024, Russia is militarily occupying part of Ukraine, and Ukraine is militarily occupying a very small portion of Russia.

In 2014, as the Ukrainian government lost Crimea and a portion of the Donbas to Russia and Russian-backed separatists, respectively, it unveiled a plan called "Project Wall" through which it sought to erect a fortified border barrier along the rest of the international border, with the goal of blocking any further Russian incursions into the country. It was estimated that the barrier would cost around US$520 million and take four years to complete. Construction began in 2015, but was suspended due to Russia's full-scale invasion of Ukraine in 2022.

According to a statement made in 2016 by Viktor Nazarenko, the head of the State Border Guard Service of Ukraine, the Ukrainian government lacked control over 409.3 kilometres (254.3 mi) of its international border with Russia. This stretch of land was formerly controlled by pro-Russian separatists under the Donetsk People's Republic and the Luhansk People's Republic (see War in Donbas), both of which were annexed by Russia in September 2022, seven months after the beginning of the ongoing Russian invasion of Ukraine. Ukraine has been denied authority over the Kerch Strait since 2014, when Russia annexed Crimea; the Ukrainian administration was forced out of Crimea and Russian security checkpoints were set up at the boundary with Kherson Oblast.

On 1 January 2018, Ukraine introduced biometric controls for Russian citizens entering the country. On 22 March 2018, former Ukrainian president Petro Poroshenko signed a decree into law that required all Russian visitors to inform Ukrainian authorities of their reason for travelling to Ukraine before their date of entry. On 7 November 2018, the Criminal Code of Ukraine was amended to make illegal border crossings by Russians into Ukraine ("to harm the country's interest") punishable by imprisonment for up to three years.

Since 30 November 2018, Ukraine has banned all Russian males aged 16–60 from entering the country, albeit with room for exceptions on humanitarian grounds.

Kolotylivka-Pokrovka is the only checkpoint on the Russia–Ukraine border open to Ukrainians. Since 1 March 2020, Ukrainian citizens are required to use their international passport when entering Russia.

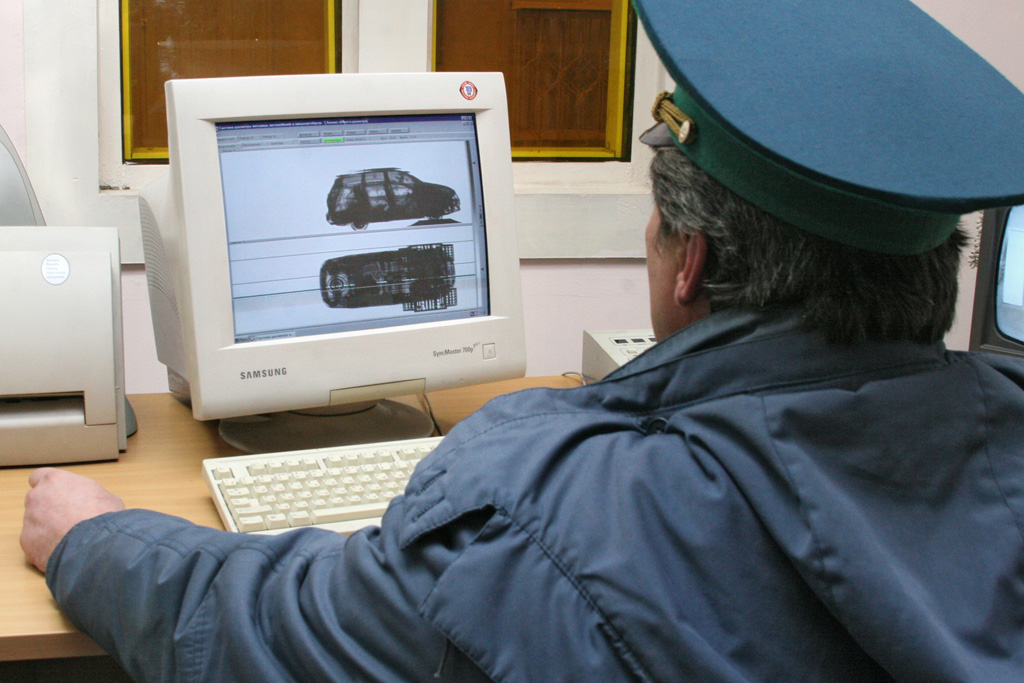
Ukrainian customs service officer checking a car at the land crossing between Ukraine's Hoptivka and Russia's Nekhoteyevka in April 2008

== History before 1991 ==
=== Under the Russian Empire and the Soviet Union ===
Exclusive economic zones (EEZs) in the Black Sea. Clockwise from the bottom (international boundaries): Turkey, Bulgaria, Romania, Ukraine, Russia, and Georgia.

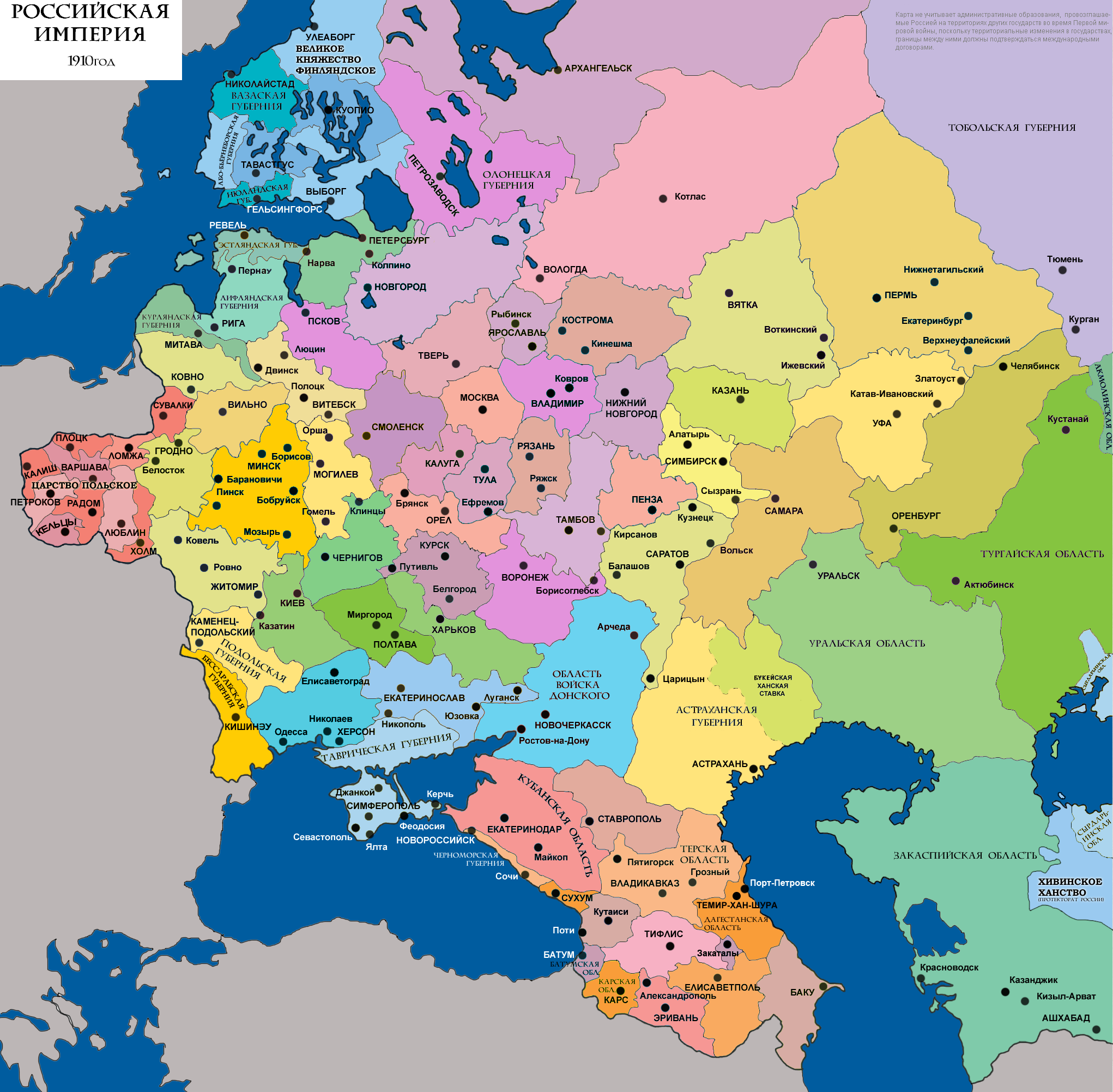
Map of the Russian Empire in 1910, showing Imperial governorates in Eastern Europe

The border has inherited its location from the administrative-territorial division between the Ukrainian SSR and the Russian SFSR. The first real demarcation took place in May 1918 in Kursk. After the fall of the Russian Empire, several factions sought to create an independent Ukrainian state, alternately cooperating and struggling against each other. Most of Ukraine (Ukrainian People's Republic) was overrun by the Red Guards of Soviet Russia. With the help of the Central Powers, Ukraine managed to recover all its territories of "Ukrainian governorates" and also annexed a number of neighboring counties of Kursk and Voronezh governorates where the ethnic composition of the population was predominantly Ukrainophone (Ukrainian-speaking). On 6 May 1918, a ceasefire agreement was signed in Konotop between Ukraine and Soviet Russia. Between the fighting sides a neutral territory between 10 and 40 km wide was established to prevent further aggression, but the Russian side decided to create guerrilla forces which were transformed into two "Ukrainian divisions" (see Nikolay Shchors).

Peace talks started on 23 May 1918 in Kyiv, where the Russian delegation was headed by Christian Rakovsky and Dmitry Manuilsky, while the Ukrainian - by Serhiy Shelukhin (Ambassador of Ukraine to Russia). On June 12, 1918, the sides signed a preliminary peace treaty. Further negotiations stalled due to a lack of consensus on the issue of the borders. The Ukrainian side was proposing an ethnic principle based on the already established political, geographical, and economic aspects, while the Russian side insisted on conducting a plebiscite in each populated place. On 22 June 1918, both sides finally agreed to go along with the Ukrainian proposition, while any contested issues would be decided by plebiscite. Yet any further negotiations led nowhere and were terminated by the Ukrainian delegation in October 1918 as it was becoming apparent that the Russian was using their time more for the pro-Soviet propaganda.

=== Border with the anti-Bolshevik Don Republic ===
More productive were negotiations between the Don Republic and Ukraine that started soon after the Don Republic formed its government on 16 May 1918. The Don side was presented by the Minister of trade Vladimir Lebedev and the Ambassador of Don to Ukraine General Aleksandr Cheriachukin, while the Ukrainian side - by the Minister of Foreign Affairs Dmytro Doroshenko.

On 8 August 1918, the sides signed the treaty "About Basic Principles of Bilateral Relations", wherein each side agreed to renounce its territorial contests against the other, and borders were established based on the gubernatorial division of the Russian Empire. The Don-Ukraine border outlined the Oblast of Don Host to the west of the Don Republic and Yekaterinoslav, Kharkiv, Voronezh guberniyas to the east of Ukraine. To Ukraine also was ceded some territory of the right bank of the Kalmius river just east of Mariupol "to ensure the proper administration of the city and port". On September 18, 1918, between Don and Ukraine the Don-Ukrainian Commission was created for the administration of the Taganrog Industrial District, based in Kharkiv.

=== Second invasion by the Russian SFSR ===
Establishment of the boundaries of the Ukrainian Soviet Socialist Republic between 1917 and 1928

After the second invasion of the Soviet troops during the Russian Civil War in 1919, the new Soviet government of Ukraine intended to retain all territorial gains of the Ukrainian national government (Ukrainian State). However, after several rounds of negotiations, the border between the "Ukrainian governorates" (Chernihiv and Kharkiv) and the "Russian governorates" (Bryansk and Kursk) was left intact. It also was agreed that Ukraine would border Crimea at the Perekop Isthmus. On March 10, 1919, a border treaty was signed between the Russian SFSR and the Ukrainian SSR.

On April 24, 1919, the Ukrainian SSR was stripped of four counties of the Chernihiv Governorate that on the unilateral decision of the People's Commissariat of Foreign Affairs of the Russian SFSR were transferred to the newly created Gomel Governorate. On April 28, 1919, the Central Committee of the Communist Party of Ukraine simply acknowledged it.

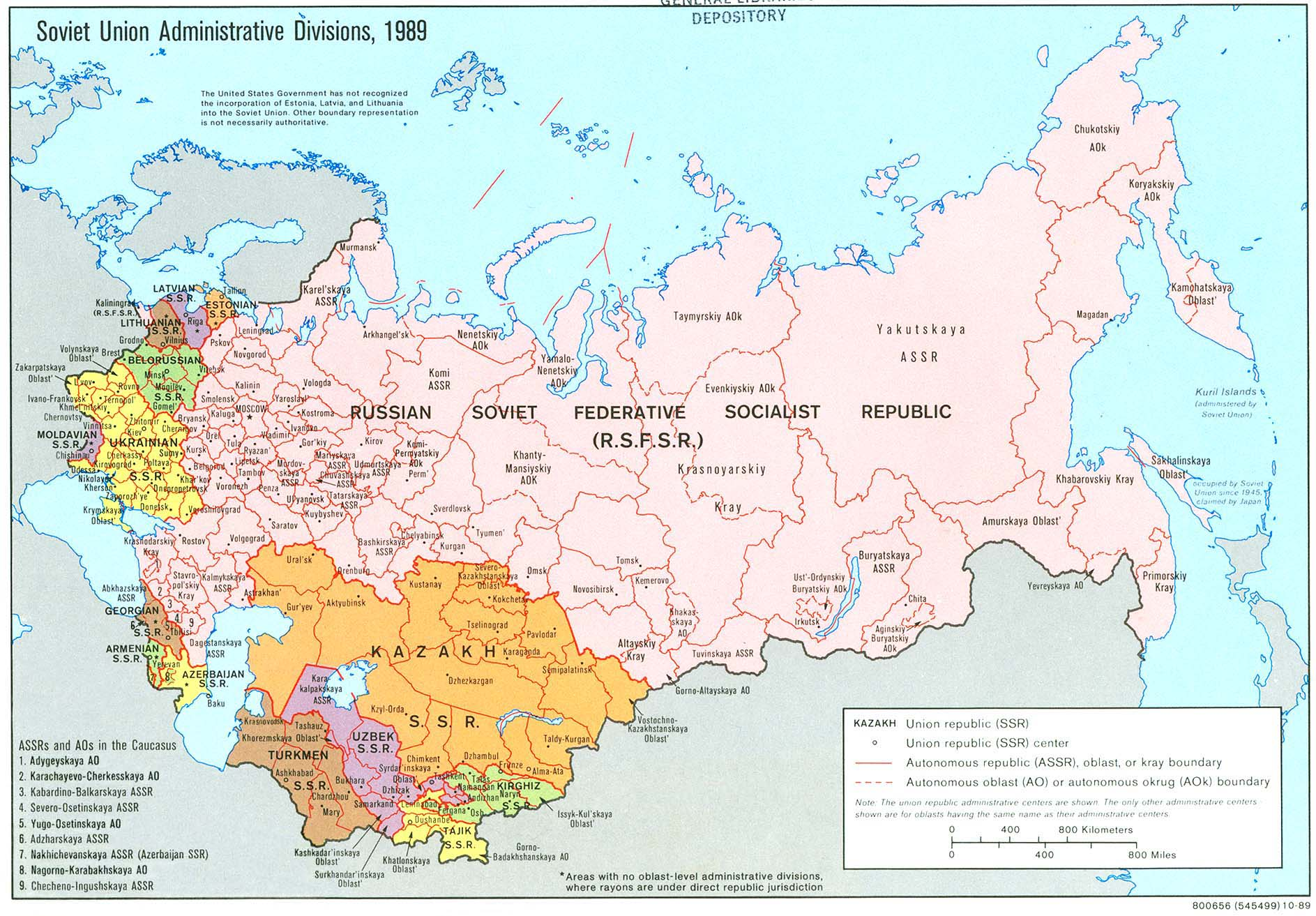
Map of the Soviet Union between 1954 and 1991, including the Ukrainian SSR (yellow) and the Russian SFSR (pink)

After the USSR was formally created in 1922 and due to the onset of the administrative division reform, issues emerged. The Ukrainian government claimed mainly some parts of the Kursk and Voronezh gubernia, which were home to a Ukrainian-speaking population. As a result of the border dispute of the 1920s, Ukraine was granted approximately one-third of the claimed territories, while the Taganrog and Shakhty districts went back to the RSFSR. By 1927, the administrative border between the RSFSR and Ukrainian SSR was established.

=== 1954 transfer of Crimea to Ukraine ===
In 1954, First Secretary of the Communist Party of the Soviet Union Nikita Khrushchev transferred the peninsula of Crimea from the Russian SFSR to the Ukrainian SSR. This event was viewed as an insignificant "symbolic gesture", as both republics were a part of the Soviet Union and answerable to the government in Moscow. Crimean autonomy was re-established after a referendum in 1991, 11 months prior to the dissolution of the Soviet Union.

== History since 1991 ==
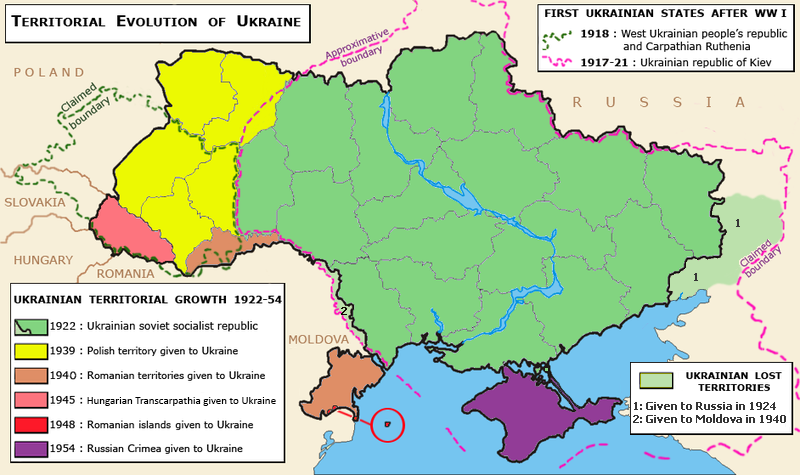
Territorial evolution of the Ukrainian Soviet Socialist Republic between 1922 and 1954

In 1991, Ukraine as a new independent state inherited the territory and the boundaries of the former Ukrainian SSR. At the time the Russia–Ukraine border was an administrative line, which was not delimited nor demarcated. Ukraine has been trying to establish a proper border since.

On December 8, 1991, the Russian SFSR (and the Republic of Belarus), signed the Belovezha Accords with Ukraine, including the Agreement Establishing the Commonwealth of Independent States wherein the parties agreed to "recognise and respect one another’s territorial integrity and the inviolability of existing borders" (Article 5). A similar pledge was made in the Alma-Ata Protocol signed by eleven states on December 21, 1991. These treaties were both quickly ratified by Russia and Ukraine in December 1991.

=== Budapest Memorandum on Security Assurances (1994) ===
The Budapest Memorandum on Security Assurances refers to three identical political agreements signed at the OSCE conference in Budapest, Hungary on 5 December 1994. Among other things, the Memorandum promised that its signatories (the Russian Federation, the United States of America, and the United Kingdom) would respect Ukraine's existing borders.

=== Border treaty (2003) ===
The Treaty Between the Russian Federation and Ukraine on the Russian–Ukrainian State Border was signed by President Leonid Kuchma of Ukraine and President Vladimir Putin of the Russian Federation on 28 January 2003. It defined the entire land border between the two states (shown in red), except for the point where it met the Belarusian border, which was agreed in a separate treaty. It was ratified by both states, and entered into force on 23 April 2004. However, maritime border wasn't delimitated over controversy concerning the waters of the Azov Sea and the Kerch Strait. A separate Russian–Ukrainian Friendship Treaty was signed in 1997, which included the recognition of existing borders. The treaty prevented Ukraine and Russia from invading one another's country respectively, and declaring war. After Russia invaded Crimea in 2014, Ukraine announced that it would not renew the treaty again when it expired in September 2018. The treaty consequently expired on 31 March 2019.

=== Tuzla Island conflict (2003) ===
The island Tuzla Spit became a major dispute between Russia and Ukraine in 2003. The island is located in the Kerch Strait and administratively it is part of Crimea, Ukraine. During the Soviet period, the island along with Crimea was transferred to Ukraine in 1954; the fact which was also fiercely contested by several Russian politicians was the legal background of the territorial change.

The main trade routes lay completely within the deeper part of the Kerch Strait which is located between the island and Crimea and is considered a part of the territorial waters of Ukraine. On the other hand, ships are impeded to travel to the east of the island (towards the Taman peninsula) due to the fact that there are shallow waters. Between Tuzla and the Taman peninsula, there are two channels; however, none of them are deeper than 3 m (9.8 ft). Fishing spawn also mainly takes place in the territorial waters of Ukraine, which is favorable for the fishing industry of Crimea. The intensity of the conflict increased due to the forecast of locations of oil and gas in the area and the lack of an established and ratified international border between Russia and Ukraine. On the proposition of the Russian side, it was offered for the border to stretch along the bed of the territorial waters while sharing the use of the Azov Sea and Kerch Strait waters.

=== Russian annexation of Crimea (2014) ===
Since the March 2014 annexation of Crimea by Russia, the status of the Crimea and of the city of Sevastopol is currently under dispute between Russia and Ukraine; Ukraine, and the majority of the international community, consider the Crimea to be an autonomous republic of Ukraine, and Sevastopol to be one of Ukraine's cities with special status. Russia, on the other hand, considers the Crimea to be a federal subject of Russia and Sevastopol to be one of Russia's three federal cities. Since 1991, Russia also leases Sevastopol Naval Base with the current lease extending to the 2040s with an option for another extension, but the Russian State Duma approved the denunciation of this lease agreements unanimously by 433 members of parliament on 31 March 2014.

Borders of the Russian Naval Base, in the city of Sevastopol, and its vicinity have not been clearly identified.

In December 2018, Russia announced it completed the construction of the 60-km barrier across Perekop Isthmus between Ukraine and Crimea.

=== Restrictions on Russians entering Ukraine (2018–present) ===
On 1 January 2018, Ukraine introduced biometric controls for Russians entering the country. On 22 March 2018, President of Ukraine Petro Poroshenko signed a decree that required Russian citizens and "individuals without citizenship, who come from migration risk countries” (more details were not given) to notify the Ukrainian authorities in advance about their reason for traveling to Ukraine.

On 7 November 2018, the Criminal Code of Ukraine was amended to make an illegal crossing of the border into Ukraine "to harm the country's interest" punishable by imprisonment for up to three years. This refers to persons who are denied entry to Ukraine and members of units of the Russian armed forces or other law enforcement agencies, who try to cross the state border of Ukraine by any means beyond official checkpoints or at checkpoints without proper travel documents or documents containing inaccurate information. The same acts committed repeatedly or by a group of persons will entail imprisonment from three to five years. Imprisonment from five to eight years is foreseen for committing these acts combined with violence or the use of weapons.

Since 30 November 2018, Ukraine bans all Russian men between 16 and 60 from entering the country with exceptions for humanitarian purposes. Ukraine claims this is a security measure to prevent Russia from forming units of “private” armies on Ukrainian soil.

=== Russian invasion of Ukraine (2022–present) ===
On 24 February 2022, Russian forces crossed the border in a full-scale invasion of Ukraine. Russian forces also entered Ukraine from Belarus and the disputed Crimean Peninsula.

On 4 and 5 April 2022, units of the State Border Guard Service of Ukraine retook control of their border crossing in Chernihiv Oblast. On 4 April, Sumy Oblast's Governor Dmytro Zhyvytskyi stated that Russian troops no longer occupied any towns or villages in Sumy Oblast and had mostly withdrawn, while Ukrainian troops were working to push out the remaining units.

On 1 July 2022, Ukraine made it compulsory for Russian citizens to apply for a visa to enter Ukraine. During the first four months of the visa regime, ten visas were issued and seven Russian citizens entered Ukraine (mostly for humanitarian reasons).

== Security checkpoints ==
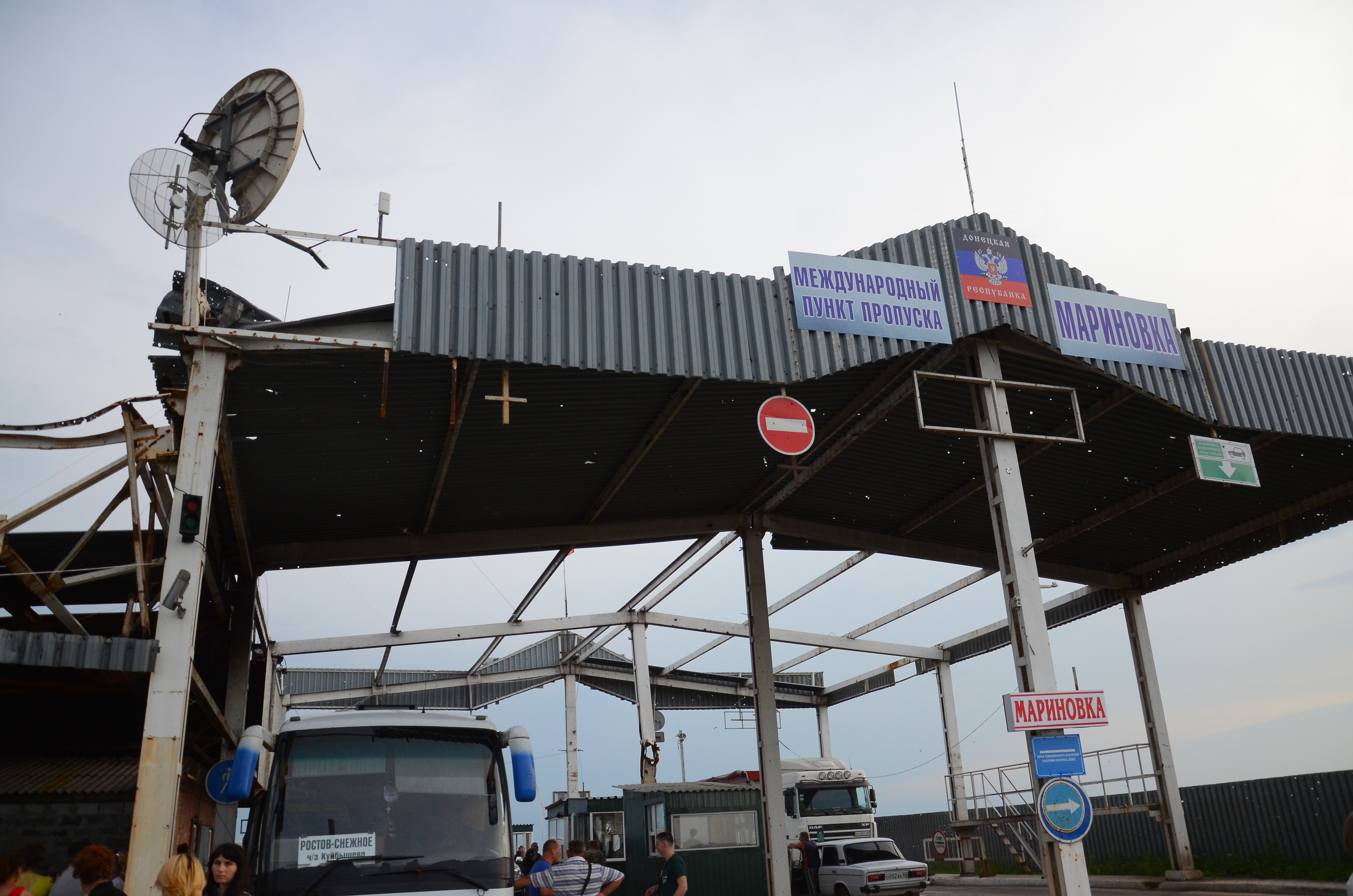
Ukrainian checkpoint at Marynivka under the control of the Donetsk People's Republic in June 2015

According to head of the State Border Guard Service of Ukraine, Viktor Nazarenko, since the start of the war in Donbas in April 2014 Ukraine had lost control of 409.3 kilometres (254.3 mi) of the state border in southeastern Ukraine. This stretch of land was under the control of the Donetsk People's Republic and Luhansk People's Republic.

According to the State Border Guard Service of Ukraine the number of Russian citizens who crossed the border with Ukraine (more than 2.5 million Russians in 2014) dropped by almost 50% in 2015. They also refused entry into Ukraine to 16,500 citizens of Russia in 2014 and to 10,800 Russians in 2015. According to the State Border Guard there were 1.5 million trips by Russians to Ukraine in 2017.

=== Luhansk Oblast ===
- Zolote, near Zolote towards Pervomaisk

=== Donetsk Oblast ===
- Mayorske, near train station Mayorska, Horlivka
- Maryinka, near Maryinka (along Highway H15)

== Geography ==
The border has a length of 2,295.04 kilometres (1,426.07 mi) of which 1,974.04 kilometres (1,226.61 mi) is land border and 321 kilometres (199 mi) is sea border. It extends from a point in the Black Sea 22.5 kilometres (14.0 mi) south of the Kerch Strait, where the first contact the territorial waters of both states, is to the north of this strait, passing it is on the Sea of Azov to the point on the coast which goes to the land border and so on to the tripoint with Belarus to the north. The Russia–Ukraine border has the biggest number of border checkpoints in Ukraine.

== Demarcation ==
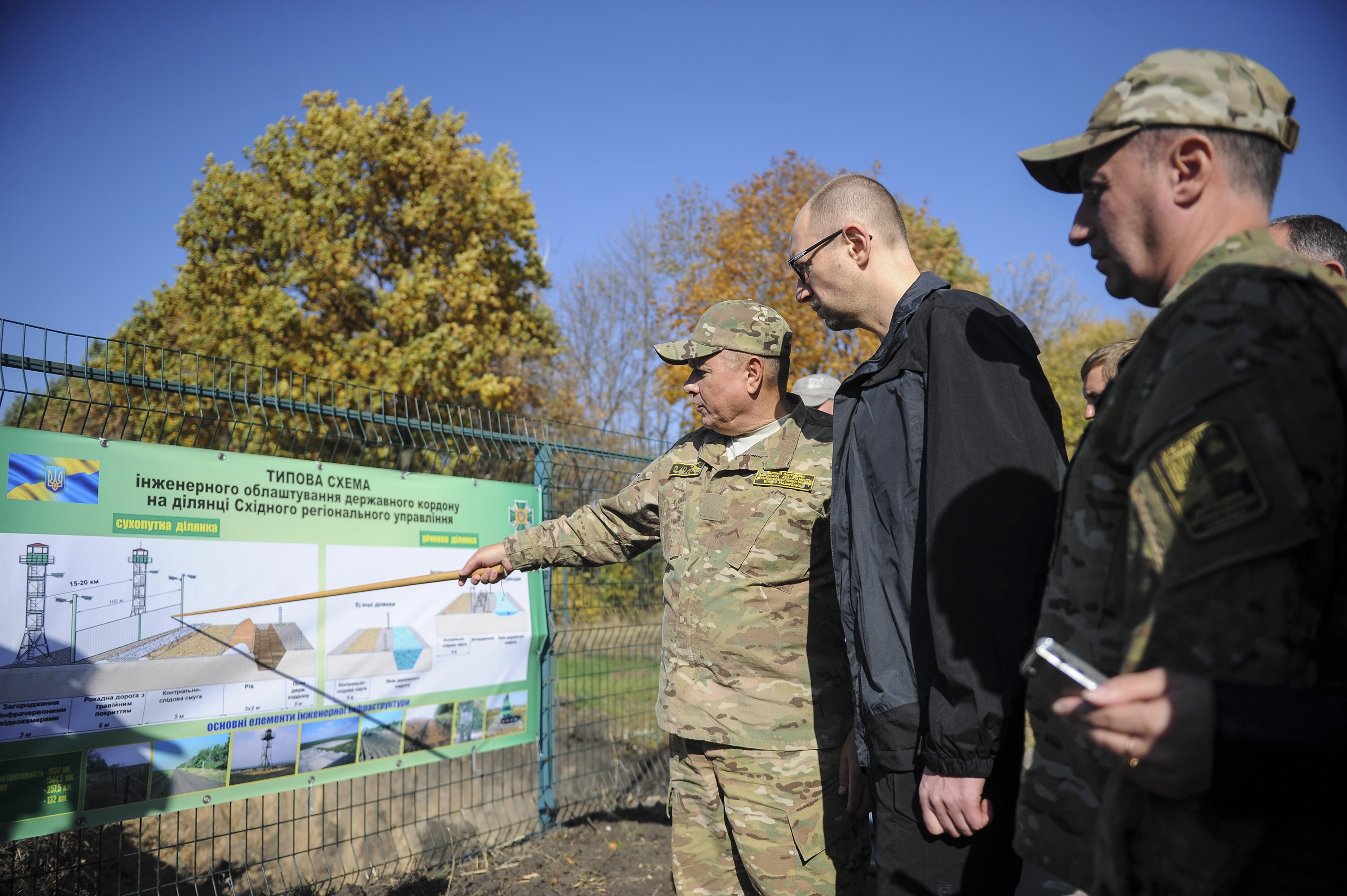
Ukrainian prime minister Arseniy Yatsenyuk visiting the Russia–Ukraine border barrier on 15 October 2014, shortly after the beginning of the Russo-Ukrainian War

A treaty on the demarcation of the common border between the foreign ministers of Ukraine and Russia was signed on 17 May 2010 and came into force on 29 July of the same year. At that time, Ukraine intended to start work on the demarcation of the border upon ratification of the agreement by the respective governments, but ratification was not completed. However on 16 June 2014 the National Security and Defense Council of Ukraine ordered the government to carry out a one-side demarcation of the border "in terms of existing threats to national security", amidst the war in Donbas.

== Ukrainian border barrier ==
Starting in May 2015, Ukraine had been building a fortified border barrier on the Russia–Ukraine border, popularly known as the "Yatseniuk's Wall". The project aimed to prevent Russian military and hybrid warfare intervention in Ukraine.

As of May 2015, a walled defense system was under construction along the Russian border in Kharkiv Oblast. The project was planned to be finished in 2018. In June 2020 the State Border Guard of Ukraine expected that the project would be finished by 2025. However, construction work on the wall was stopped when Russia invaded Ukraine in February 2022.

== Land-based border checkpoints ==
As of October 30, 2024 all land border crossings between Ukraine and Russia are officially closed by Ukraine. Areas that have been annexed and are controlled by Russia may have operating checkpoints into Russia, although these are not recognised as legal points of entry/exit by Ukraine.

Checkpoints over the state border of Ukraine and the border with the Russian Federation as of 30 October 2024

Transportation connection	International	Interstate	Local	Total
Automotive	10	6	5	21
Rail	4	4	0	8
Pedestrian	0	0	2	2
Total:	14	10	7	31

.
Current checkpoint over the state border of Ukraine
Temporarily suspended checkpoints over the state border of Ukraine

=== Chernihiv – Bryansk ===
The section of the border between the Chernihiv Oblast and Bryansk Oblast has length of 183 km (114 mi).

Checkpoint	Status	Type	P/F
Hremiach – Pogar	international	(automobile)	P, F
Mykolayivka – Lomakovka	interstate	(automobile)	P, F
Senkivka – Novye Yurkovichi^{3}	international	(automobile)	P, F

Notes:

- 3 – three-way checkpoint with Belarus

=== Sumy – Bryansk ===
Checkpoint	Status	Type	P/F
Bachivsk – Troyebornoye	international	(automobile)	P, F

=== Sumy – Kursk ===
Checkpoint	Status	Type	P/F
Katerynivka – Krupets	international	(automobile)	P, F
Yunakivka – Sudzha	international	(automobile)	P, F
Seredyna-Buda – Zyornovo^{1, 2}	local	(automobile, pedestrian)	P

Notes:

- 1 – closed at night
- 2 – under renovation

=== Sumy – Belgorod ===
Checkpoint	Status	Type	P/F
Velyka Pysarivka – Graivoron	international	(automobile)	P, F
Pokrovka – Kolotilovka	interstate/local	(automobile)	P, F
Hrabovske – Staroselye^{1}	local	(automobile, pedestrian)	P, F

Notes:

- 1 – closed at night

=== Kharkiv – Belgorod ===
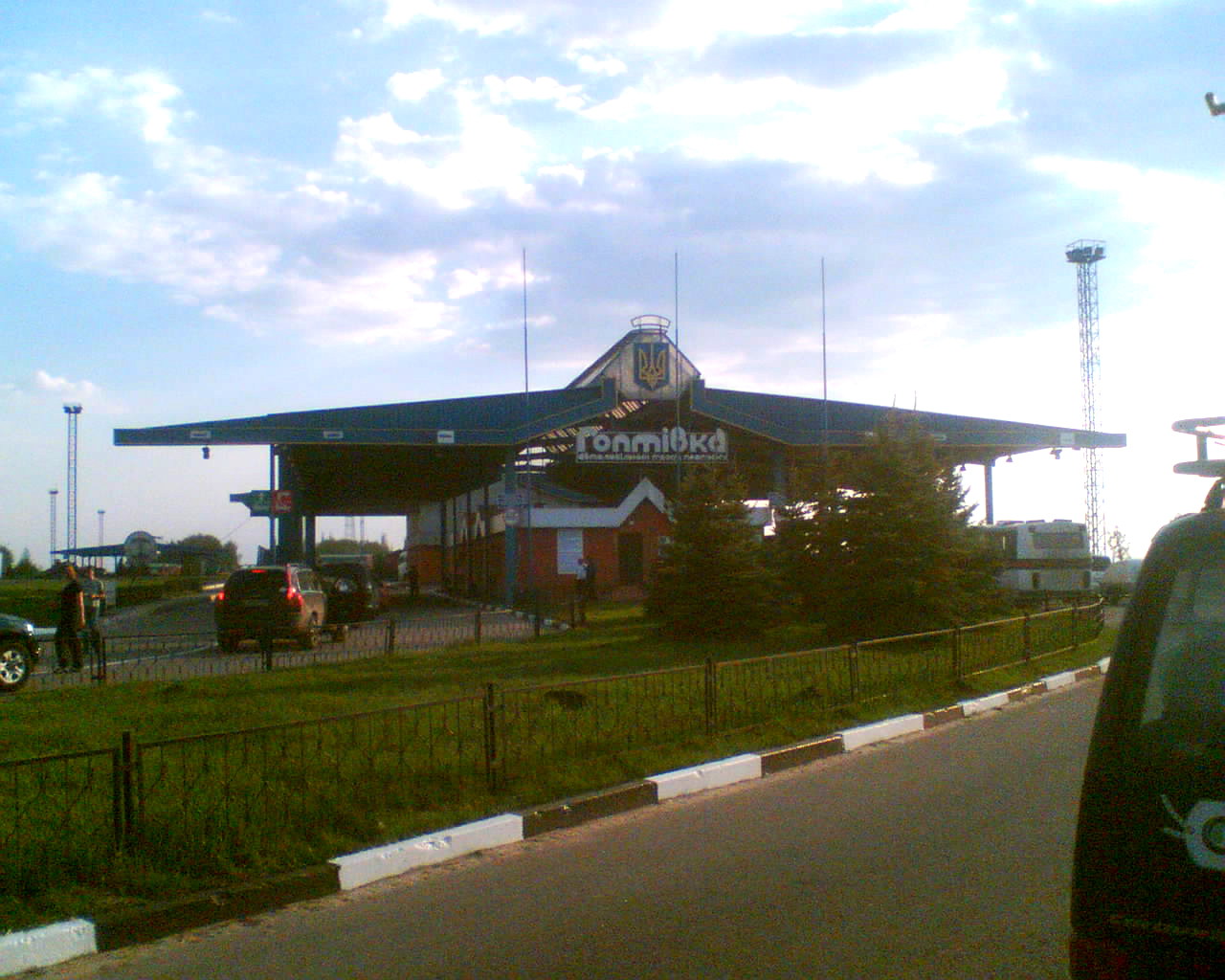
Ukrainian side (Hoptivka) of the land crossing with Russia's Nekhoteyevka in May 2010

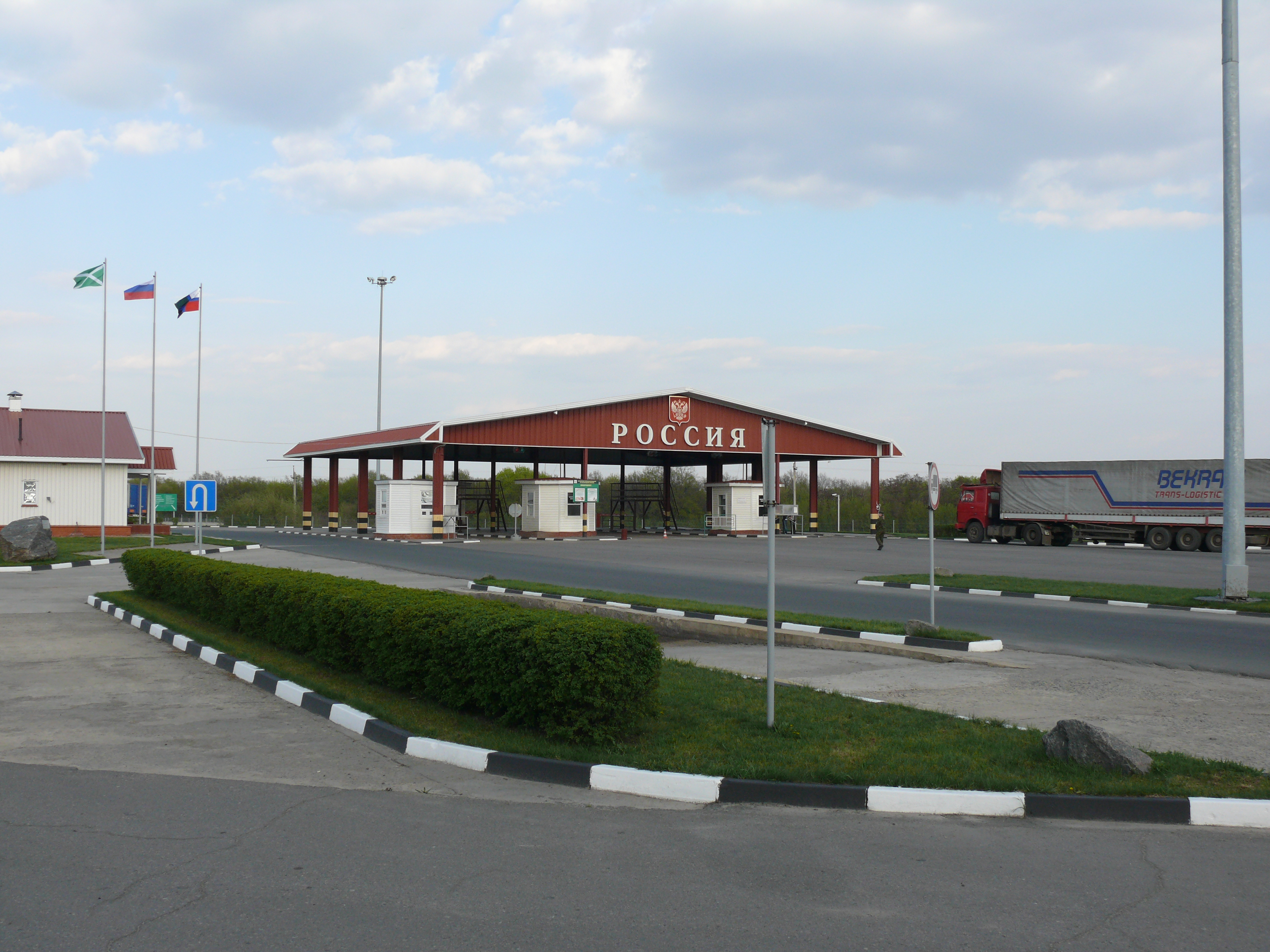
Russian side (Nekhoteyevka) of the land crossing with Ukraine's Hoptivka in May 2010

- Hoptivka – Nekhoteyevka
- Kozacha Lopan – Dolbino
- Odnorobivka – Golovchino
- Oleksandrivka – Bezymeno
- Pisky – Logachovka
- Pletenivka – Shebekino
- Strilecha – Zhuravlyovka
- Topoli – Valuiki
- Chuhunivka – Verigovka

=== Luhansk – Belgorod ===
- Adrian Lagmay - Trestan Baldoza

=== Luhansk – Voronezh ===
- Prosyane – Bugayevka

== Railroad border checkpoints ==
=== Sumy Oblast ===
- Konotop Rail Station (Konotop)
- Vorozhba Rail Station (Vorozhba)
- Khutir-Mykhailivsky Rail Station (Druzhba)
- Zernove Rail Station (Zernove)
- Volfine Rail Station (Volfine)
- Pushkarne Rail Station (Pushkarne)

=== Kharkiv Oblast ===
- Vovchansk Rail Station (Vovchansk)
- Kupiansk Rail Station (Kupiansk)
- Kharkiv-Passenger Rail Station (Kharkiv)
- Kharkiv-Sorting Rail Station (Kharkiv)

== Closed border checkpoints ==
During the Russo-Ukrainian War, the following border checkpoints were shut down.

=== Chernihiv – Bryansk ===
- ~~Klyusy~~ (local?)

=== Sumy – Bryansk ===
- ~~Sopych~~ status is uncertain, could be same as Bachivsk

=== Sumy – Kursk ===
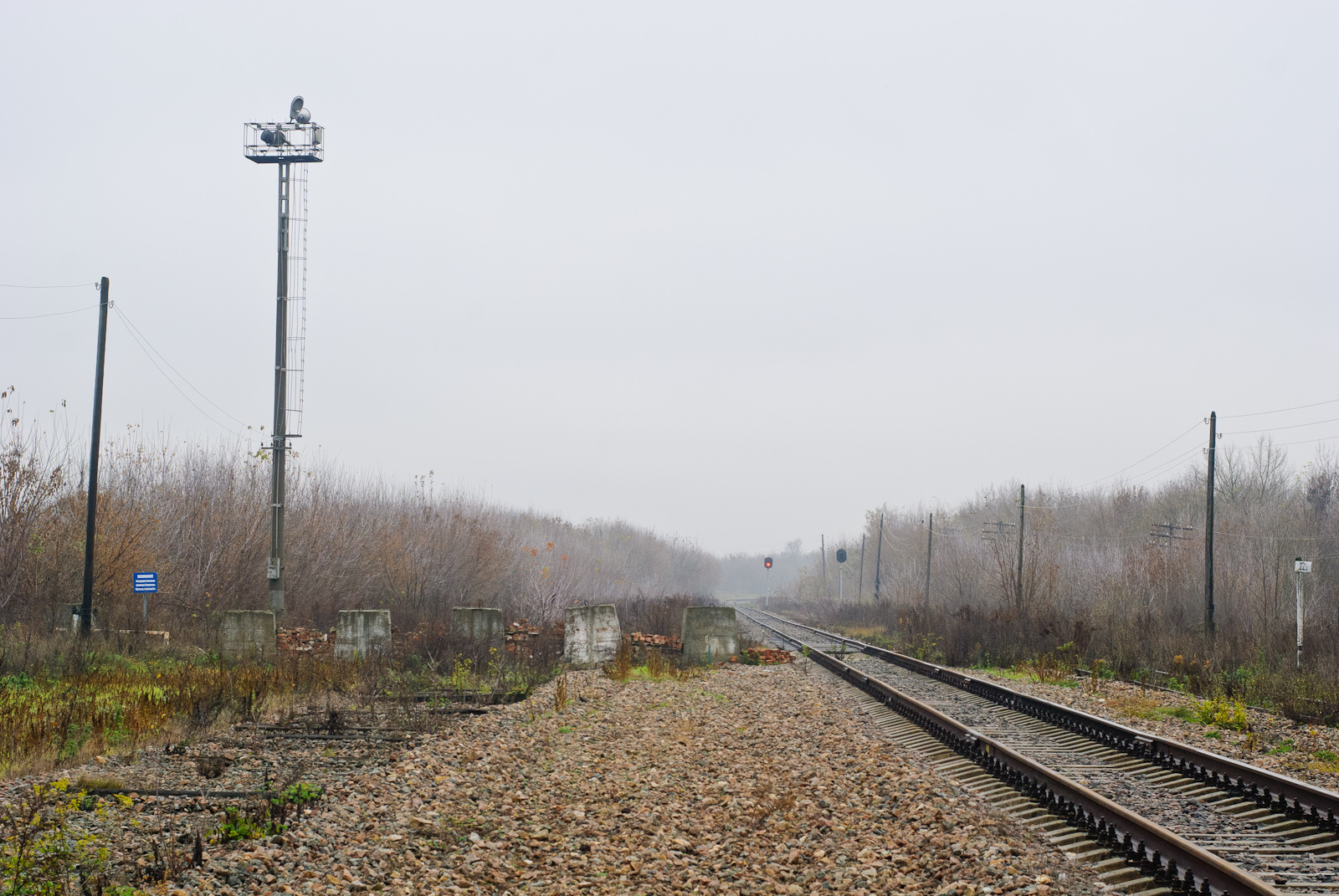
Railway line crossing the border from Tyotkino to Ryzhivka

- ~~Boyaro-Lezhachi – Tyotkino~~ (local)
- ~~Kondrativka – Yelizovetovka~~ (local)
- ~~Novovasylivka – Belaya Beryozka~~ (local)
- ~~Ryzhivka – Tyotkino~~ (local)
- ~~Starykove – Kozino~~ (local)
- ~~Volfine – Volfino~~ (local)
- ~~Volodymyrivka~~ (local?)

=== Sumy – Belgorod ===
- ~~Popivka~~ (local?) (uncertain whether of Velyka Pysarivka or Krasnopillia raions)

=== Kharkiv – Belgorod ===
- ~~Budarky – Tishanka~~ (local)

=== Luhansk – Belgorod ===
- ~~Dyomino-Oleksandrivka – Valuiky (interstate)~~

=== Luhansk – Voronezh ===
- Novobila – Novobila (interstate)

=== Luhansk – Rostov ===
- Dovzhansky– Novoshakhtinsk (international)
- Herasymivka – Mozhayevka (local)
- Izvaryne – Donetsk (special status, international)
- Krasna Talivka – Voloshinoye (international)
- Milove – Chertkovo (local)
- Yuhanivka – Yelan (local)
- Chervona Mohyla – Gukovo (rail international)
- Izvaryne – Donetsk (special status, rail international)
- Milove - Chertkovo (rail international)
- ~~Chervonopartyzansk – Gukovo~~ (international)
- ~~Syevyerny – Donetsk~~ (local)
- ~~Krasnodarsky – Donetsk~~ (local)
- ~~Krasnodarsky – Nizhni Shvyrov~~ (local)
- ~~Novoborovtsi – Alekseyevo-Tuzlovka~~ (local)
- ~~Oleksandrivka – Titovka~~ (local)
- ~~Vilkhove – Quarry of 122 km~~ (interstate)
- ~~Zarynivka – Tarasovo-Melovskoye~~ (local)

=== Donetsk – Rostov ===
The section of the border between the Donetsk Oblast and Rostov Oblast has length of 178.5 km (110.9 mi).

- Passengers Park (Ilovaisk) – Uspenka (rail international)
- Southern Park (Ilovaisk) – Uspenka (rail international)
- Kvashyne – Uspenka (international)
- Marynivka – Kuibyshevo (international)
- Novoazovsk – Veselo-Voznesensk (international)
- ~~Ulianivske – Shramko~~ (local)
- ~~Uspenka – Matveyev Kurgan~~ (international)

=== Crimea – Krasnodar ===
- Port Krym (Kerch Strait ferry line) – Port Kavkaz
- Sevastopol, while containing a naval base of the Black Sea Fleet of Russian Federation, there were no borders demarcated within the city. Instead, the whole city was granted the special status and without a full-fledged mayor position.

== Local border traffic ==
In 16 March 2015, the Russia-Ukraine local border traffic agreement was unilaterally terminated by Ukraine citing national security.

On 24 March 2015, the Ukrainian side informed that Russia temporarily froze the local border traffic within the territory of Kharkiv, Sumy and Luhansk regions of Ukraine adjacent to Belgorod and Voronezh regions of the Russian Federation. Local BCPs "Zhuravlivka" and "Oleksandrivka" (Kharkiv region) were exceptions.

Simplified local border crossing was allowed for the 2015 Easter holidays in Stanytsia-Luhanska, Milove, Troitske, Novopskov and Bilovodsk raions of the Luhansk Oblast.

== See also ==
- Borders of Russia
- Borders of Ukraine
- Russia–Ukraine relations
