= Krasna Talivka =

Coordinates: 48.853530°N 39.845751°E

Krasna Talivka (Russian: Красная Таловка, Ukrainian: Красна Талівка) is a village in Shyrokyi rural hromada, Shchastia Raion of Luhansk Oblast. It is under the de facto control of Russia. It was founded in 1913. On September 30, 2022, the village was annexed by the Russian Federation via an internationally unrecognized referendum.

About 2.5 mi (4.0 km) to the north of the village is a border checkpoint Krasna Talivka that is located on the highway P 22 crossing the former border of Ukraine with Russia. Along with the neighboring village of Krasnyi Derkul, the village formed Krasna Talivka rural council (municipality).

According to Ukraine's 2001 census, the village was home to 1,081 residents. The population is predominantly Russophone (72.1%), while only 27.3% consider the Ukrainian language as their native.

To the east of the Krasna Talivka is the village of Talove, Shchastia Raion, and to its west is the Krasnyi Derkul village. It is flanked from the north and south by the Rostov Oblast of Russia.
