= Pomsta Brigade =

3rd Border Detachment named after the Hero of Ukraine Colonel Yevgeny Pikus
- Ukrainian: 3-я бригада "Помста" імені Героя України полковника Євгена Пікуса
- Sleeve patch of the Brigade
- Active: 30 January 2024 – present
- Country: Ukraine
- Branch: State Border Guard Service of Ukraine
- Type: Brigade
- Role: Assault brigade
- Garrison/HQ: Lysychansk
- Nickname: Pomsta (Revenge)
- Motto: Reborn to win!
- Mascot: Phoenix
- Equipment: #Equipment
- Engagements: Russo-Ukrainian war; War in Donbass; Battle of the Border; Siege of the Luhansk border base; Russian invasion of Ukraine; Eastern Ukraine campaign; Battle of Rubizhne; Battle of Kreminna; Battle of Lyman; Battle of Lysychansk; Battle of Severodonetsk; Battle of Borova; Battle of Popasna; Battle of Seversk; Battle of Fedorivka; Battle of Sviatohirsk; Battle of Bakhmut; Kupiansk offensive
- Decorations: For Courage and Bravery
- Website: https://www.luhanskdpsu.army/

Commanders
- Current Commander: Colonel Serhiy Mykolayovych Lozinsky
- Chief of Staff: Colonel Novak Serhiy

Insignia
- Former Insignia

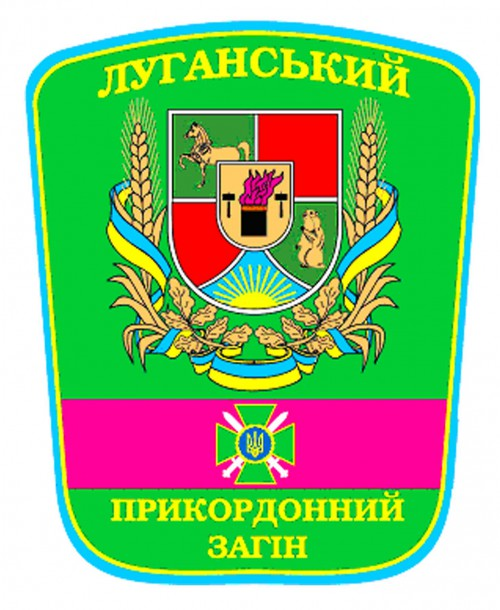
- Former Insignia

The 3rd Border Detachment named after the Hero of Ukraine Colonel Yevgeny Pikus, also known as Pomsta Brigade, (Ukrainian: Помста, lit. 'Revenge') is an assault brigade of the State Border Guard Service of Ukraine that is part of the Offensive Guard.

More than 1,000 servicemen of the brigade have been awarded state awards, among them six were awarded the "Hero of Ukraine", four of them posthumously.

== History ==
=== Early history ===
The 3rd border detachment was created on 20 October 1992, following the Dissolution of the Soviet union and was tasked with protecting the state border of Ukraine with Russia in Luhansk Oblast. During the 1990s, the detachment actively worked on developing its structure and improving its skills.

=== War in Donbass ===
In 2014, following the Euromaidan, Revolution of Dignity, 2014 pro-Russian unrest in Ukraine and the Russian invasion of Crimea, the War in Donbass started. The 3rd border detachment took on the task of protecting the border in wartime conditions as well as humanitarian missions, ensuring the crossing of citizens and goods across the demarcation line and anti-smuggling operations.The Russian-Ukrainian war began in 2014 after the Maidan, when revolutionary events and changes of power took place in Ukraine. The Russian Federation announced the annexation of Crimea and began supporting militants in eastern Ukraine who declared independence for the Donetsk and Luhansk People's Republics. At about 4 o'clock in the morning on 2 June 2014, separatists attacked the detachment during the Battle of the Border wounding at least eight border guards during the siege of the Luhansk border base. The detachment also suffered heavy losses, because militants and Russian troops were fighting from the border. Senior Sergeant Volodymyr Arshinov was wounded by grenade fragments and a bullet in the stomach. The border guards requested support but the dispatched Su-27 fighter jet did not use weapons as the separatists were occupying positions in residential buildings. The battle continued on 2–4 June 2014, grenade launchers and large-caliber "Utes" machine guns were used and ultimately the detachment's positions were overrun. On 20 June 2014, the detachment's Izvaryne-Donetsk post was overwhelmed and the personnel were forced to retreat into Russian territory, where many guardsmen were captured, and later returned to Ukraine. On 26 June 2014, a soldier of the detachment (Oleksiy Stepanovych Kozachenko) was killed in combat with separatists. On 10 July 2014, a major of the detachment (Shirpal Leonid Viktorovych) was killed during a separatist attack. On 10 August 2014, four guardsmen of the detachment (Vyacheslav Igorovich Akutin, Serhii Volodymyrovych Andrienko, Dzidzinashvili Davyd Georgiyovych and Shilo Volodymyr Serhiyovych) were killed as a result of shelling of the "Pivnich" TU. On 12 August 2014, from 10:45 p.m. to 11:00 p.m., the detachment's checkpoint was fired at by artillery and mortars from Russia. On 25 August 2014, Colonel Yevheny Mykhailovych Pikus along with three soldiers of the detachment (Vyacheslav Oleksandrovich Firsov, Vyacheslav Oleksandrovich Firsov and Oleg Serhiyovych Sorochenko) were killed and three wounded in a clash in Krasnaya Talivka when border guards stopped a separatist reconnaissance group that infiltrated Ukraine from Russia at about 3 p.m. The battle lasted 2.5 hours, the terrorists were supported by artillery from the Russian Federation as well as mortars, two armored personnel carriers and two BMPs and two Mi-24 combat helicopters which fired unguided rockets at Ukrainian border guards. Ultimately the separatists were forced to retreat. On 4 September 2014, the detachment's Krasna Talivka (border checkpoint) was fired upon by the Russian military. On 9 September 2014, three soldier of the detachment (Maksimenko Oleksandr Oleksandrovych, Yury Oleksandrovych Lukyantsev and Kuznetsov Vyacheslav Mykhailovych) were killed and two guardsmen (Artem Kruchinin and Vitaly Skokov) were seriously wounded as a result of a landmine detonation beneath their vehicle near the village of Nizhnobaranivikka while accompanying the film crew of the Luhansk TV company "IRTA", which left to prepare a story about the death of two families of local residents from Russian artillery shelling. The vehicle of the detachment caught fire after hitting the landmine. On 23 October 2014, a soldier of the detachment (Serhii Evgenovich Deinega) was killed in combat under undisclosed circumstances. On 31 October 2014, a guardsman of the detachment (Cheremys Ruslan Volodymyrovych) was killed by the detonation of the UAZ car by a TM-62. On 8 November 2014, near Krasnaya Talivka two border guardsmen were wounded as a result of a landmine explosion. On 12 November 2014, the detachment's office in Milove was shot at with a grenade launcher leaving no casualties. Political tensions led to security cameras being installed on the Russian side of the border, and a fence being erected on the Ukrainian side of the border. On 27 November 2015, two Russian servicemen were detained in the city, and later exchanged back to Russian authorities. On 14 December 2014, a guardsman of the detachment (Novak Andriy Serhiyovych) was killed in action under undisclosed circumstances.

On 28 September 2017, two guardsmen of the detachment (Dede Dmytro Vasyliovych and Huvir Serhiy Ivanovich) were killed as a result of a landmine explosion.

On 24 August 2018, the detachment was awarded the honorary name "Colonel Yevgeny Pikus", the Luhansk detachment's former colonel, who was killed by LPR saboteurs.

=== Full scale invasion ===
Brigade soldiers in liberated Yampil during Operation Vivaldi

The Luhansk detachment of the State Border Guard Service of Ukraine has been operating in combat on the frontlines since during the invasion of Ukraine the entire Russian-Luhansk border has been occupied by Russia and its proxy, the Luhansk People's Republic (LPR). The unit saw the first casualty of the Russian invasion of Ukraine, with Master Sergeant Denys Tkach being killed by a Russian DRG at 03:40 on 24 February 2022 at a border checkpoint in Zorynivka near Milove. It then took part in operations on the front in Donetsk Oblast, Luhansk Oblast and Kharkiv Oblast especially during the Battle of Rubizhne, Battle of Kreminna, Battle of Lyman, Battle of Lysychansk, Battle of Severodonetsk, Battle of Borova, Battle of Popasna, Battle of Seversk, Battle of Fedorivka, Battle of Sviatohirsk and Battle of Bakhmut. On 2 May 2022, a guardsman of the detachment (Efremov Kostyantyn Volodymyrovych) was killed in action in Voivodivka. On 3 May 2022, a guardsman of the detachment (Ivan Zhiryk) was killed as a result of artillery strikes on Voivodivka. On 23 May 2022, a guardsman of the detachment (Vitaly Zhuk) was killed as a result of an artillery strike during the Battle of Lyman. On 7 September 2022, it was awarded the honorary award "For Courage and Bravery".

On 2 January 2023, a guardsman of the detachment (Mykola Sergeyevich Litvinov) was killed as a result of shelling during the Battle of Bakhmut. On 25 January 2023, a guardsman of the detachment (Oleksandr Kharkivets) was killed while performing a combat mission near Ivanovske as a result of an artillery strike. On 20 March 2023, a guardsman of the detachment (Oleg Hryhorovych Konoval) was killed as a result of Russian assault on the detachment's positions. On 9 June 2023, a guardsman of the detachment (Reshetnyak Oleksiy) was killed in combat.

The unit was officially elevated to a brigade, and became the Pomsta Brigade which is the 10th unit in the Offensive Guard via a press release by the State Border Guard Service on 30 January 2024. On 1 February 2024, the brigade announced that three Russian servicemen had surrendered to the unit, including a conscript from Ryazan, a migrant worker from Grozny, and a unit commander from Pskov. In June 2024, the Brigade has been stationed in Chasiv Yar, as part of the ongoing battle there, where the brigade has constructed field fortifications and participated in other defensive efforts. From their position in Chasiv Yar, the unit has also been able to perform kamikaze drone attacks on Russian forces in Bakhmut, publishing footage of the destruction of a Russian T-90M and several Russian howitzer positions. The unit used similar tactics when fighting in the Serebryansky forest, using vampire drones against Russian forces there. On 28 June 2024, a guardsman of the brigade (Bohdan Teplyukh) was killed in action. On 19 August 2024, a guardsman of the brigade (Oleg Protsailo) was killed in a battle with Russian forces. On 23 August 2024, a guardsman of the brigade (Mykhailo Malkush) and another guardsman (Velichko Dmytro), the next day were killed in combat near Bilohrivka. On 2 October 2024, a guardsman of the brigade (Rostislav Prokopchuk) was killed near Bilohrivka.

In total, the unit has lost more than 50 border guards, and many more were wounded.

In 2026 the unit took part in the Ukrainian counter offensive near Lyman, known as Operation Vivaldi. During the operation they, together with DOZOR unit of the DPSU, supported the 3rd Army Corps in liberating several villages.

== Commanders ==
- Colonel A.V. Lebedynskyi (1992–1998)
- Colonel Kuropat V.V. (1998–2003)
- Lieutenant Colonel O. I. Medvedchuk (2003–2006)
- Colonel Andrushchenko Yevhenii Yuriyovych (2006–2011)
- Colonel Serhiy Vasylyovych Deineko (2011–2014)
- Colonel Andrushchenko Yevhen Yuriyovych (2014–2016)
- Colonel Kovalchuk Yury Borisovych (2016–2018)
- Colonel Oleksandr Volodymyrovych Martynyuk (2018–2019)
- Colonel Yurii Petrovych Petriv (2019–2022)
- Colonel Andrii Serhiyovych Kulesh (2022–2023)
- Colonel Osypets Oleksandr Valeriyovych (2023–2024)
- Colonel Serhiy Mykolayovych Lozinsky (2024-)

== Equipment ==
- Kozak-7
- Roshel Senator
- T-64BV
- ZU-23-2

== Structure ==
- Management and Headquarters
- Unmanned Systems Regiment "Phoenix"
- Department of border service "Stanytsia Luhanska"
- Department of border service "Zolote"
- Department of border service "Krasna Talivka"
- Department of Border Service "Bilovodsk"
- Department of Border Service "Markivka"
- Department of the Border Service "Bilolutsk"
- Department of Border Service "Troitske"
- department of border service "Milove" named after V. Bannih
- Department type "C" of Lysychansk
- Department type "C" of Raigorodka
- Border command post "Schastya"
- Border command post "Novopskov"
- Guardian Units

Its tasks formerly included the operations of:

- Three highway checkpoints
  - Prosyane
  - Milove
  - Tanyushivka
- One railway checkpoint
  - Lantrativka.
- Two local checkpoints
  - Milove
  - Sirotine
- Three entry-exit control points
  - Zolote
  - Shkastyi
  - Stanytsia Luhanska

== Sources ==
- dpsu.gov.ua
- mil.in.ua
- Ukrmilitary
- DolyaKyiv
- ТСН
- ДПСУ
- ukranews
- LB.ua
- УкрІнформ
- Луганська обласна державна адміністрація
- РадіоСвобода
- Указ Президента
- Луганський прикордонний загін Державної прикордонної служби України
- Луганський прикордонний загін Ukrainian Military Pages
- ПРИКОРДОННИК УКРАЇНИ № 40 (5342), 26 ЖОВТНЯ 2012 РОКУ
