= Shyrokyi rural hromada =

Shyrokyi rural hromada Широківська селищна громада
- Hromada
- Interactive map of Shyrokyi rural hromada
- Country: Ukraine
- Oblast: Luhansk
- Raion: Shchastia

Area
  - Total: 580.4 km^{2} (224.1 sq mi)

Population (2020)
  - Total: 6,652
  - Density: 11.46/km^{2} (29.68/sq mi)
- Settlements: 14
- Rural settlements: 5
- Villages: 9

Shyrokyi rural hromada (Ukrainian: Широківська селищна громада) is a hromada of Ukraine, located in Shchastia Raion, Luhansk Oblast. Its administrative center is the village of Shyrokyi.

It has an area of 580.4 square kilometres (224.1 mi^{2}) and a population of 6,652, as of 2020.

The hromada contains 14 settlements, including 9 villages:

- Blahovishchenka
- Vilne
- Harasymivka
- Derkulske
- Zolotarivka
- Krasna Talivka
- Krasnyi Derkul
- Oleksandrivka
- Chuhinka

And 5 rural-type settlements: Kozachiy, Stepove, Rozkvit, Talove, and Shyrokyi.

== See also ==
- List of hromadas of Ukraine
