= Nazarenko =

Nazarenko is a surname of Ukrainian origin, meaning son or daughter of Nazar. Notable people with the surname include:

- Aleksandr Nazarenko (1948–2022), Russian historian
- Anastasia Nazarenko (born 1993), Russian gymnast
- Anatoly Nazarenko (born 1948), Kazakhstani wrestler
- Anton Nazarenko (born 1984), Russian badminton player
- Dmytro Nazarenko (born 1987), Ukrainian footballer
- Hryhory Nazarenko (1902–1997), Ukrainian bandura player
- Leonid Nazarenko (born 1955), Soviet-Russian football player and coach
- Liudmyla Nazarenko (born 1967), Ukrainian basketball player
- Nikolai Nazarenko (1911–1992), Don Cossack leader who fought for Germany in WWII
- Oleksandr Nazarenko (born 2000), Ukrainian football player
- Oleksandr Nazarenko (judoka) (born 1986), Ukrainian Paralympic judoka
- Olesya Nazarenko (born 1976), Turkmenistani wrestler and judoka
- Pavel Nazarenko (born 1995), Belarusian footballer
- Serhiy Nazarenko (born 1980), Ukrainian football player and manager
- Tatyana Nazarenko (born 1944), Russian painter
- Viktor Nazarenko (born 1956), Ukrainian military leader
