= Zalisne, Luhansk Oblast =

Rural locality in Luhansk Oblast, Ukraine

Zalisne Залісне
- Village
- Location within Ukraine Location within Luhansk Oblast
- Coordinates: 49°50′53″N 39°07′46″E
- Country: Ukraine
- Oblast: (Ukraine) Luhansk Oblast
- Raion: Starobilsk Raion
- Elevation: 163 m (535 ft)

Population (2001)
  - Total: 58

Zalisne (Ukrainian: Залісне) is a rural locality (village) in Starobilsk Raion, Luhansk Oblast, Ukraine.

Prior to 18 July 2020, Zalisne belonged to Novopskov Raion. That raion was abolished as part of Ukraine's administrative reform, which reduced the number of raions in Luhansk Oblast to eight. Only four of those raions remained under government control. Following the reform, the area of Novopskov Raion was merged into Starobilsk Raion.
