= Aidar settlement hromada =

Aidar settlement hromada Айдарська селищна громада
- Hromada
- Interactive map of Aidar settlement hromada
- Country: Ukraine
- Oblast: Luhansk
- Raion: Starobilsk

Area
  - Total: 982.3 km^{2} (379.3 sq mi)

Population (2020)
  - Total: 23,142
  - Density: 23.56/km^{2} (61.02/sq mi)
- Settlements: 21
- Villages: 20
- Towns: 1

Aidar settlement hromada (Ukrainian: Айдарська селищна громада) is a hromada of Ukraine, located in Starobilsk Raion, Luhansk Oblast. Its administrative center is the town of Novopskov.

It has an area of 982.3 square kilometres (379.3 mi^{2}) and a population of 23,142, as of 2020.

The hromada contains 21 settlements: 1 settlement (Aidar) and 20 villages:

- Bulavinivka
- Hanusivka
- Dontsivka
- Zaaidarivka
- Zakotne
- Ikove
- Kamianka
- Lysohorivka
- Makartetyne
- Novorozsosh
- Osynove
- Pantyukhine
- Pisky
- Pisarivka
- Rohove
- Rybyantseve
- Solone
- Stepne
- Tev Yasheve
- Hvorostyan

== See also ==
- List of hromadas of Ukraine
