= Treaty on the Russian–Ukrainian border =

2003 agreement between Russia and Ukraine

Treaty on the Russian-Ukrainian border
Treaty between Ukraine and the Russian Federation on the Ukrainian-Russian State Border
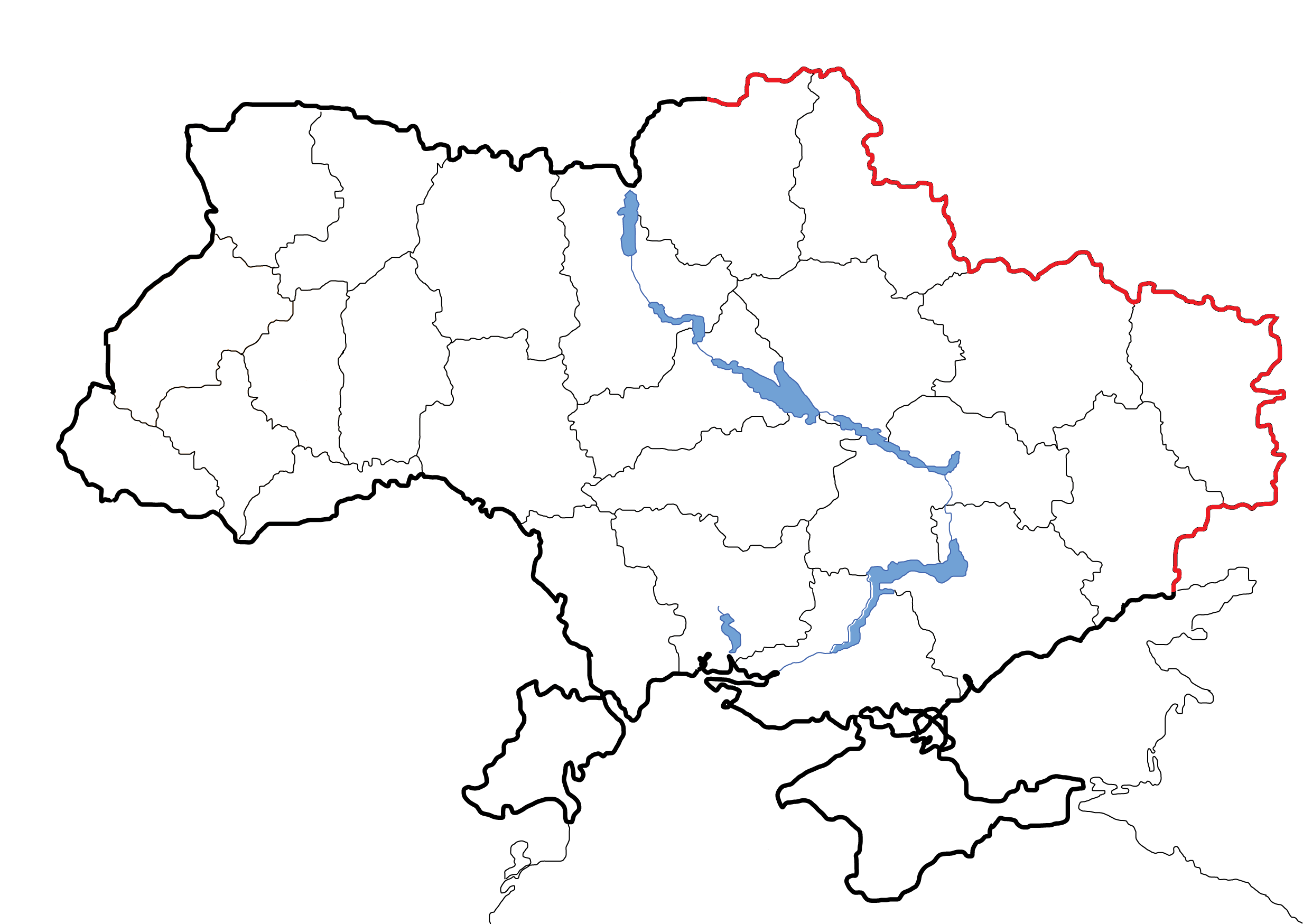
- Signed: January 28, 2003
- Location: Kyiv, Ukraine
- Effective: April 23, 2004
- Signatories: Vladimir Putin; Leonid Kuchma
- Parties: Ukraine and Russia
- Language: Russian and Ukrainian

The Treaty on the Russian–Ukrainian border is a bilateral international treaty between the Russian Federation and Ukraine, which delineated the land border line between the two countries.

== Terms of the Treaty ==
The Treaty defines the "Russia–Ukraine state border" as the line and vertical surface passing along this line, separating the state territories (land, waters, subsoil, and airspace) of the Contracting Parties from the point of junction of the state borders of the Russian Federation, Ukraine, and the Republic of Belarus to the point located on the shore of the Taganrog Gulf.

The border follows the path as specified in the Description of the Passage of the State Border between the Russian Federation and Ukraine. The description and maps of the state border attached to the Treaty are its integral part.

It is considered that the junction point of the borders of Ukraine, Russia, and Belarus is the "Friendship Mound," or "Three Sisters Mound" – the Border Junction in the village of Senkivka of the Chernihiv Raion of the Chernihiv Oblast, entirely within the territory of Ukraine. According to the official classification of the UN, this triple junction point is designated as "080 byruua" (in alphabetical order: by – Belarus, ru – Russia, ua – Ukraine). However, it is not enshrined at the level of a trilateral international treaty.

== Signing and ratification ==
On January 28, 2003, during the visit of the President of the Russian Federation Vladimir Putin to Kyiv, the Treaty on the state border between the two countries was signed, which fixed its land part.

Ukraine ratified the Treaty on April 20, 2004, and the Russian Federation on April 22.

During the period between the signing and ratification of the Treaty, the Tuzla Island conflict occurred, sparked by Russia's construction of a dam in the Kerch Strait from the Taman Peninsula to Tuzla Island. Analysts believed the conflict aimed to pressure Ukraine regarding the delimitation of the border in the Kerch Strait and the Sea of Azov.

The Treaty entered into force on the date of the exchange of instruments of ratification on April 23, 2004.

== Implementation and violation ==
The simultaneous ratification of the Treaty on the Russia–Ukraine state border and the Treaty Between the Russian Federation and Ukraine on Cooperation in the Use of the Sea of Azov and the Kerch Strait on December 24, 2003, completed the legal formalization of the border line on land. On July 29, 2010, the Treaty on the demarcation of the Ukrainian–Russian state border entered into force, creating the legal basis for initiating the process of marking the Russia–Ukraine state border on the ground.

The problem of demarcating the land part of the Russia–Ukraine border remained a "frozen" issue in bilateral relations for many years. For many years, the Russian Federation obstructed this process.

As no measures to demarcate the border were taken due to the resistance of the Russian Federation, the Ukrainian side decided to unilaterally carry out activities to mark the border on the ground. Direct demarcation of the border is carried out based on the Resolution of the Cabinet of Ministers of Ukraine of May 14, 2015, "On marking the Ukrainian–Russian state border on the ground".

Beginning its armed aggression against Ukraine in 2014, Russia violated fundamental norms and principles of international law, as well as a number of bilateral and multilateral treaties and agreements, including the Treaty on the Ukraine-Russia state border.

== See also ==
- State Border of Ukraine
- State Border of Russia
- Russia–Ukraine relations
- Russia–Ukraine barrier
