= Denys Tkach =

Ukrainian border guard (died 2022)

- Born: September 13, 1988; Mykilske, Luhansk Oblast, Ukraine
- Died: February 24, 2022 (aged 33); Zorynivka, Luhansk Oblast, Ukraine
- Spouse: Oksana Tkach
- Children: 2
- Military career
- Allegiance: Ukraine
- Unit: Pomsta Brigade
- Conflicts: Russo-Ukrainian War; Russian invasion of Ukraine; Eastern Ukraine campaign †

Denys Viktorovych Tkach (Ukrainian: Денис Вікторович Ткач) was a Ukrainian border guard widely believed to be the first victim of the Russian invasion of Ukraine that started on February 24, 2022. Tkach was believed to be killed about one hour before Vladimir Putin's announcement, but minutes after the first Russian troops were ordered to enter Ukraine. He was shot dead in Zorynivka, Luhansk Oblast.

== Death ==
At the time of his death, Tkach was serving in the 3rd Border Detachment, tasked with managing the Ukrainian-controlled Luhansk Oblast border with the Russian Federation. He joined the State Border Guard Service of Ukraine in 2007, aged 19.

On the evening of February 23, 2022, Tkach and his six-man unit were stationed at Zorynivka border crossing, a minor border crossing 120 km north of Luhansk. His wife would later decribe how, as tensions between Russia and Ukraine were raising in the past months, he was "barely at home in the last month". She would also declare that she spoke for about two hours with her husband before going to sleep, not expecting Russia to invade that night despite the ongoing tensions.

At 3:40 AM, Tkach and his unit noticed about eight Russian soldiers heading in their direction using thermal imagers. Artem Umanets, a unit colleague, reported that Tkach, as the senior of their unit, ordered the rest of the men to retreat and he would soon follow. As Umanets and the rest of the unit ran, he reported he heard gunshots. About 20 minutes later, shortly after 4 AM, Tkach's wife reported that she was awakened by heavy machinery roaring through the village. The invasion announcement came shortly after, at about 4:30 AM.

Tkach's body was found later that day and buried in his native village.

== Family and aftermath ==
Tkach was survived by his wife and two daughters who fled to Volodymyr in Volyn Oblast following six months of occupation. Tkach's mother would flee to Russia four days after his death.
