= Phoenix Unmanned Systems Regiment =

Unmanned Systems "Phoenix" Regiment
- Ukrainian: Головний відділ безпілотних авіаційних систем «Фенікс»
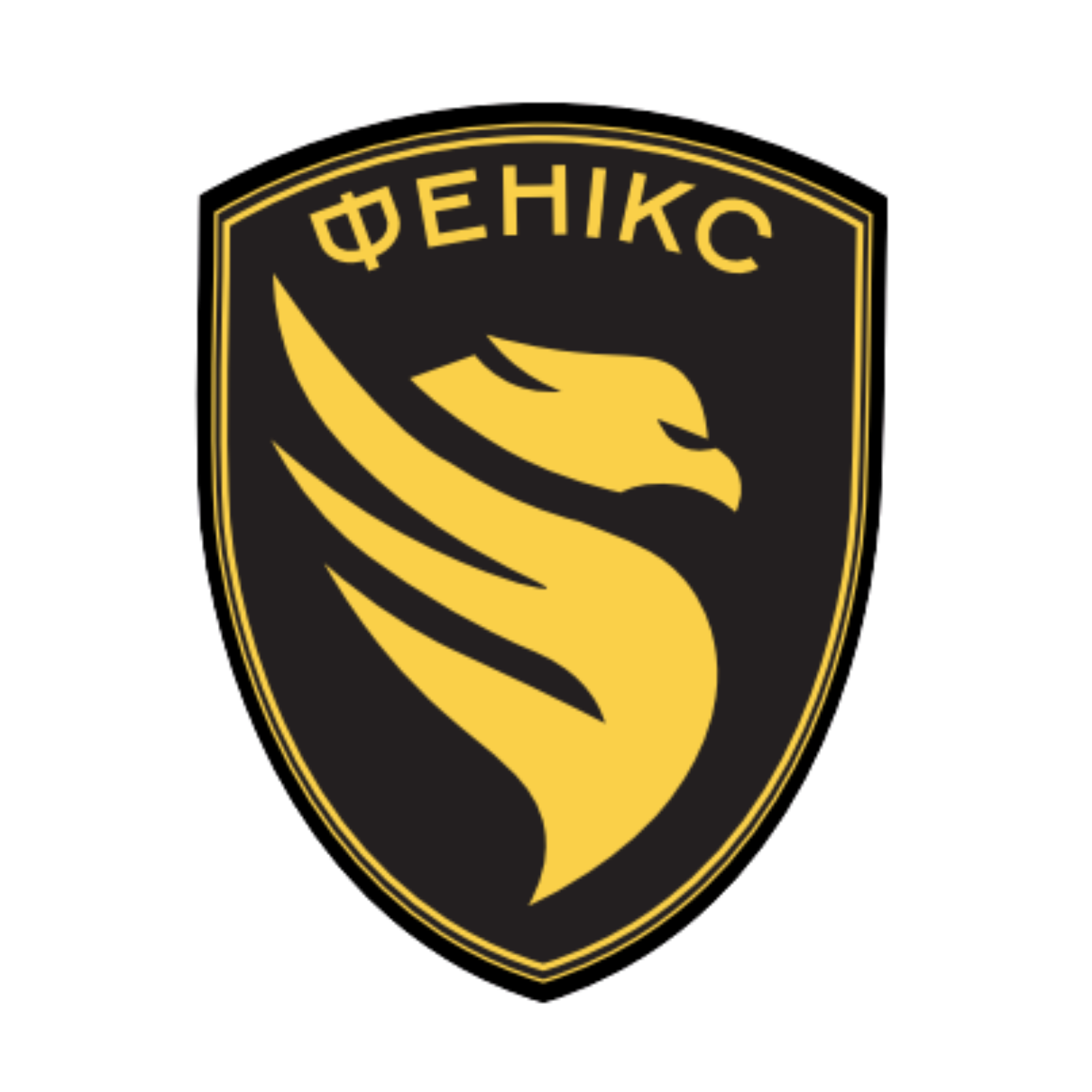
- Insignia
- Active: 2024 – present
- Country: Ukraine
- Allegiance: Ukraine
- Branch: State Border Guard Service of Ukraine
- Type: Unmanned Systems Forces
- Role: Aerial Reconnaissance, Drone Warfare, FPV drone strikes, Ground Drone Warfare, Cargo Transport
- Size: Regiment
- Part of: Pomsta Brigade
- Nickname: Phoenix
- Engagements: Russo-Ukrainian war; 2022 Russian invasion of Ukraine

Commanders
- Current commander: Lieutenant Colonel Dmytro Oleksiuk

Insignia
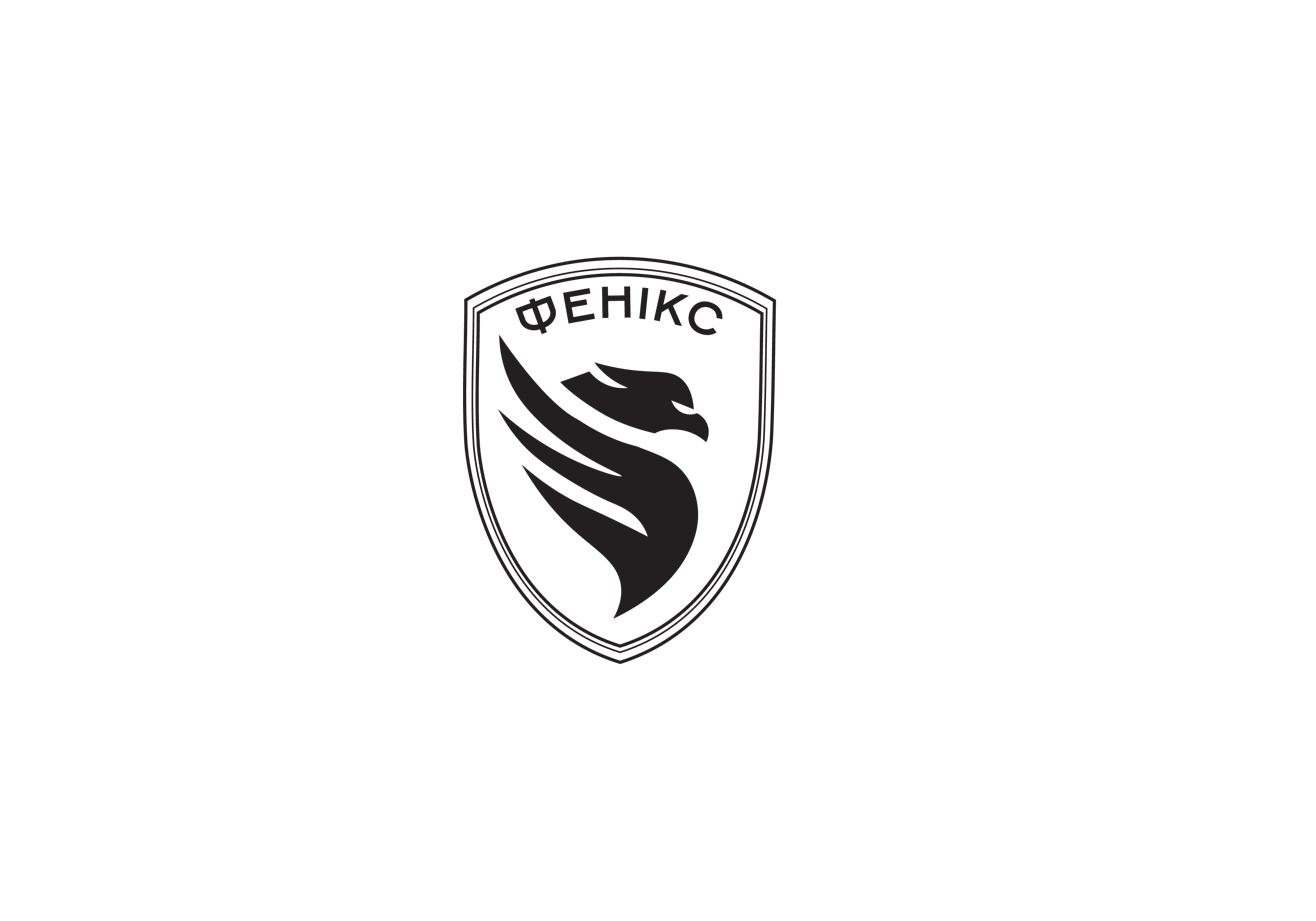
- Alternative Insignia

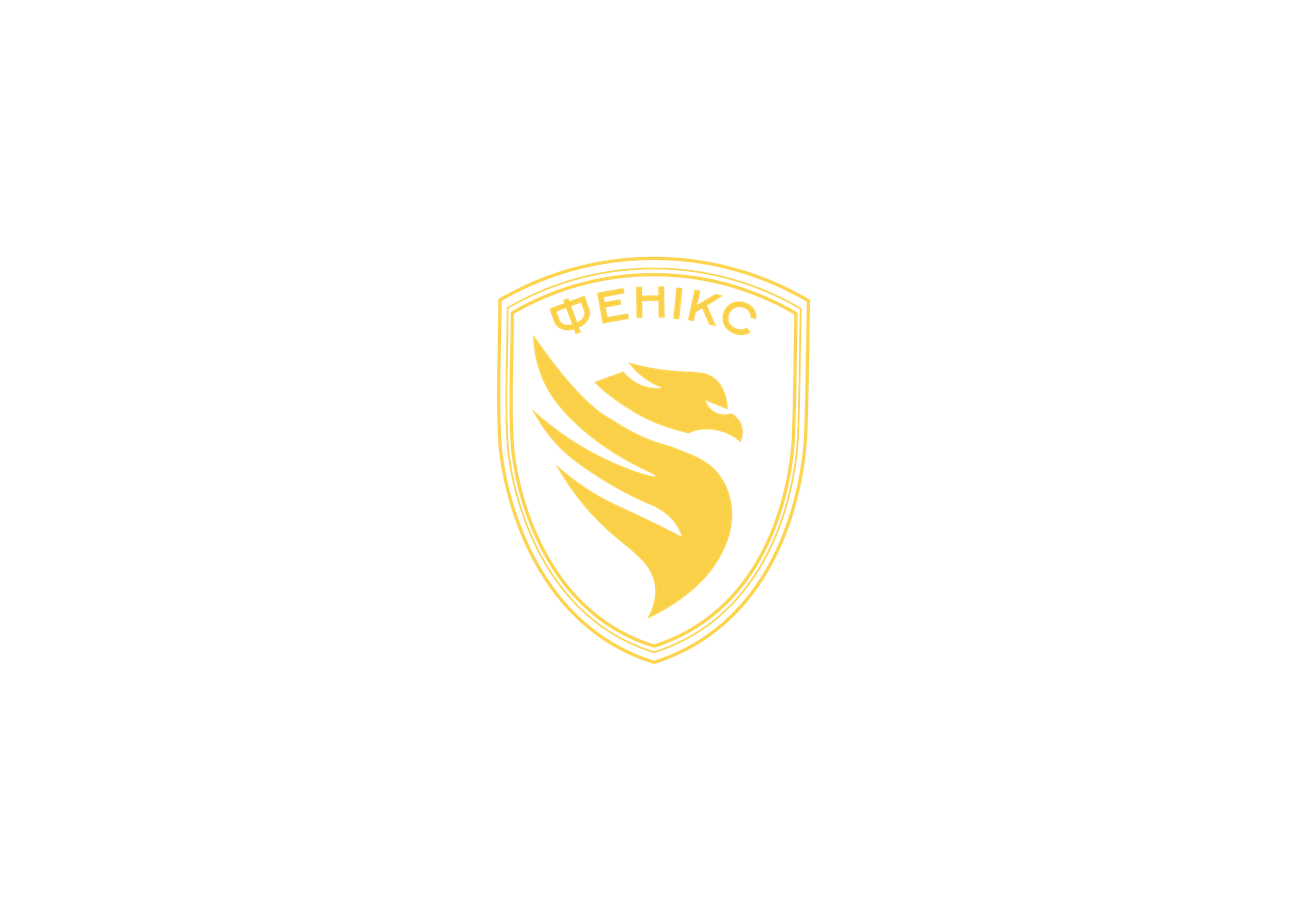
- Alternative Insignia

The Main Department of Unmanned Aerial Vehicles "Phoenix" or the "Phoenix" Unmanned Systems Regiment is a regiment level Unmanned Systems unit of the State Border Guard Service of Ukraine, a part of the Pomsta Brigade. It is the largest and most successful UAV unit of the Ukrainian border guard. It was established in 2024 during the Russian invasion of Ukraine and is the sole border guard unit to be part of the presidential project "Drone Line", part of the Unmanned Systems Forces. Its commander Lieutenant Colonel Dmytro Oleksiuk has been awarded the Hero of Ukraine.

== History ==
The Phoenix UAV Group originated from the 2nd Border Rapid Response Command of the Luhansk Border Detachment. In January 2024, the Phoenix UAV Group of the 2nd Border Response Command, headed by Dmytro Oleksiuk was deployed to partake in the Battle of Bakhmut, seeing combat for the first time destroying Russian personnel, artillery pieces and armored vehicles including tanks. In late summer 2024, the unit was expanded and became the 1st Border Commandant's Office of the Rapid response Reconnaissance and Strike Unmanned Aerial Systems "Phoenix". In mid 2024, the 1st UAV Commandant Office "Phoenix", led by Commandant Dmytro Oleksiuk, was carrying out combat operations in several areas of the frontline, in Bakhmut, Lyman, and Kupiansk directions. It was equipped with various attack FPV drones, rotor and fixed wing "bomber" UAVs, fixed wing percussion drones, multirotor and fixed wing aerial reconnaissance drones, radars and electronic warfare equipment as well as robotic ground vehicles.

In 2024 "Phoenix" claimed to have hit 1,742 Russian personnel killing at least 933, moreover, 169 armored vehicles including 54 tanks were hit by the unit. At the end of 2024, "Army of Drones" project was initiated with five most effective UAV units becoming a part of it, "Phoenix" became the sole representative of the State Border Guard Service of Ukraine. In the second last week of December 2024, "Phoenix" destroyed a Russian T-72 tank and damaged another and also hit 2 transport vehicle, an armored vehicle, 2 IFVs and numerous structures in Kupiansk direction, which was followed by the destruction of a 120-mm mortar and four IVFs, in the last week.

In February 2025, it was expanded to the Main Department of Unmanned Aviation Systems "Phoenix" or the Phoenix Regiment with the area of responsibility being Donetsk Oblast, Luhansk Oblast and Kharkiv Oblast. On 23 March 2025, "Phoenix" struck and destroyed a Russian R-330 Zhitel Electronic Warfare vehicle in Donetsk Oblast. As of April 2025, Phoenix had killed over 1,500 Russian personnel and wounded over 1,200 more and had also destroyed 103 tanks, 205 armored vehicles, 99 mortars, 284 artillery pieces, 1924 transport vehicles, 458 ammunition depots, 43 drone control points and 342 Russian drones, amongst its targets were the "Zoopark-1" radar station worth $25 million and the T-90M tanks, the regiment had inflicted a total damage worth one billion USD on Russian forces. On 13 April 2025, it destroyed a Russian an armored vehicle, an MT-LB and a Russian position. On 14 April 2025, Phoenix reported killing two Russian soldiers and wounding one as well as destruction of an MT-LB, an S-60 cannon, two armored vehicles, six trucks including one caddying ammunition, four additional vehicles and a boat by its forces over the past week. On 16 April 2025, it destroyed a Russian UAV control position. On 3 May 2025, "Phoenix" repelled a Russian assault in Kupiansk, destroying town motorcycles and two quadricycles killing two Russian soldiers and wounding six more. On 26 May 2025, it further destroyed a Russian tank along with vehicles including "bukhankas" and motorcycles, at least ten Russian personnel were also killed. On 29 May 2025, it destroyed a Russian R-330 Zhytel electronic warfare system. As of early July 2025, UAV operators of the Phoenix unit had hit 10,000 targets including 3,421 Russian personnel killing 2,175 and wounding 1,246, moreover, 404 heavy armored vehicles including 157 tanks were also struck. On 2 July 2025, its UAVs destroyed a Russian BM-21 Grad MLRS, an anti-aircraft gun, an armored vehicle and a truck. On 15 July 2025, "Phoenix" struck three Russian armoured vehicles including two, moreover two transport ‘loaf’ vehicles, an ATV, a lorry and a Russian position were struck, around a dozen Russian personnel were killed as well. On 18 July 2025, the unit destroyed two Russian tanks, a D-20 howitzer, a "Bukhanka" van, a motorcycle and eliminated 10 Russian soldiers. On 22 July 2025, Phoenix UAVs destroyed a Russian tank, an armoured vehicle, two "loaf" vehicles and killed around a dozen Russian personnel by striking their position. On 5 August 2025, it destroyed a Russian BM-21 Grad.

== Commanders ==
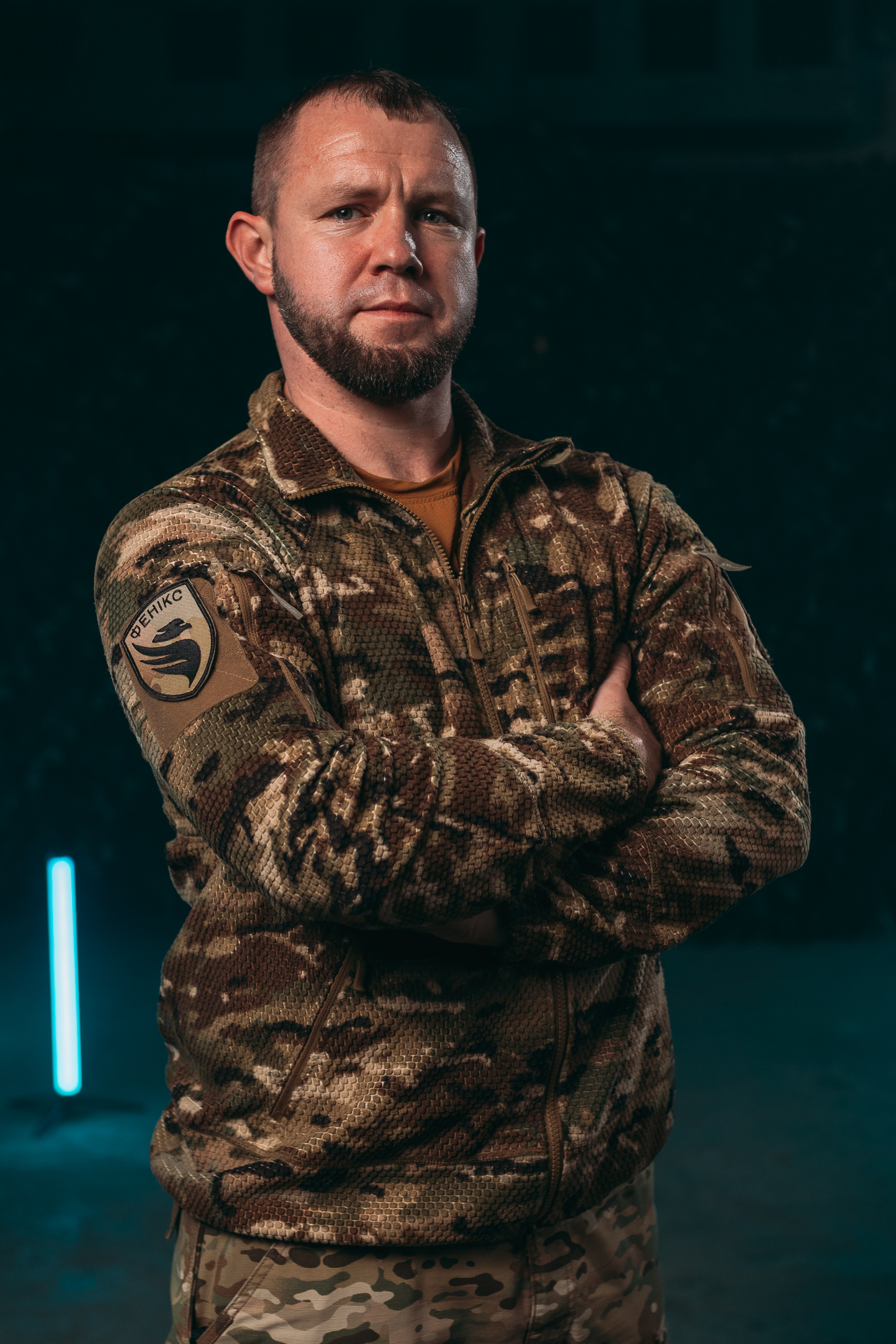
Lieutenant Colonel Dmytro Mykhailovych Oleksiuk

- Lieutenant Colonel Dmytro Mykhailovych Oleksiuk (2024-)
