= Chuhinka =

Village in Luhansk Oblast, Ukraine

Coordinates: 48°55′N 39°38′E

Chuhinka is a small village in Shyrokyi rural hromada, Shchastia Raion, in the eastern part of the Luhansk Oblast of Ukraine. It is near the border of Ukraine and Russia. The village was originally founded in the year 1720. According to the 2001 Ukraine Census, it had 1,128 residents, 92.73% of whom were Russian speakers. The area is mostly used for farmland, used by individual families after the breakup of the Kolkhoz. There is a small river and a mountain.

Nearby villages include Oleksandrivka and Bilovodsk.
