= Novopskov =

Urban locality in Luhansk Oblast, Ukraine

Novopskov Новопсков
- Rural settlement
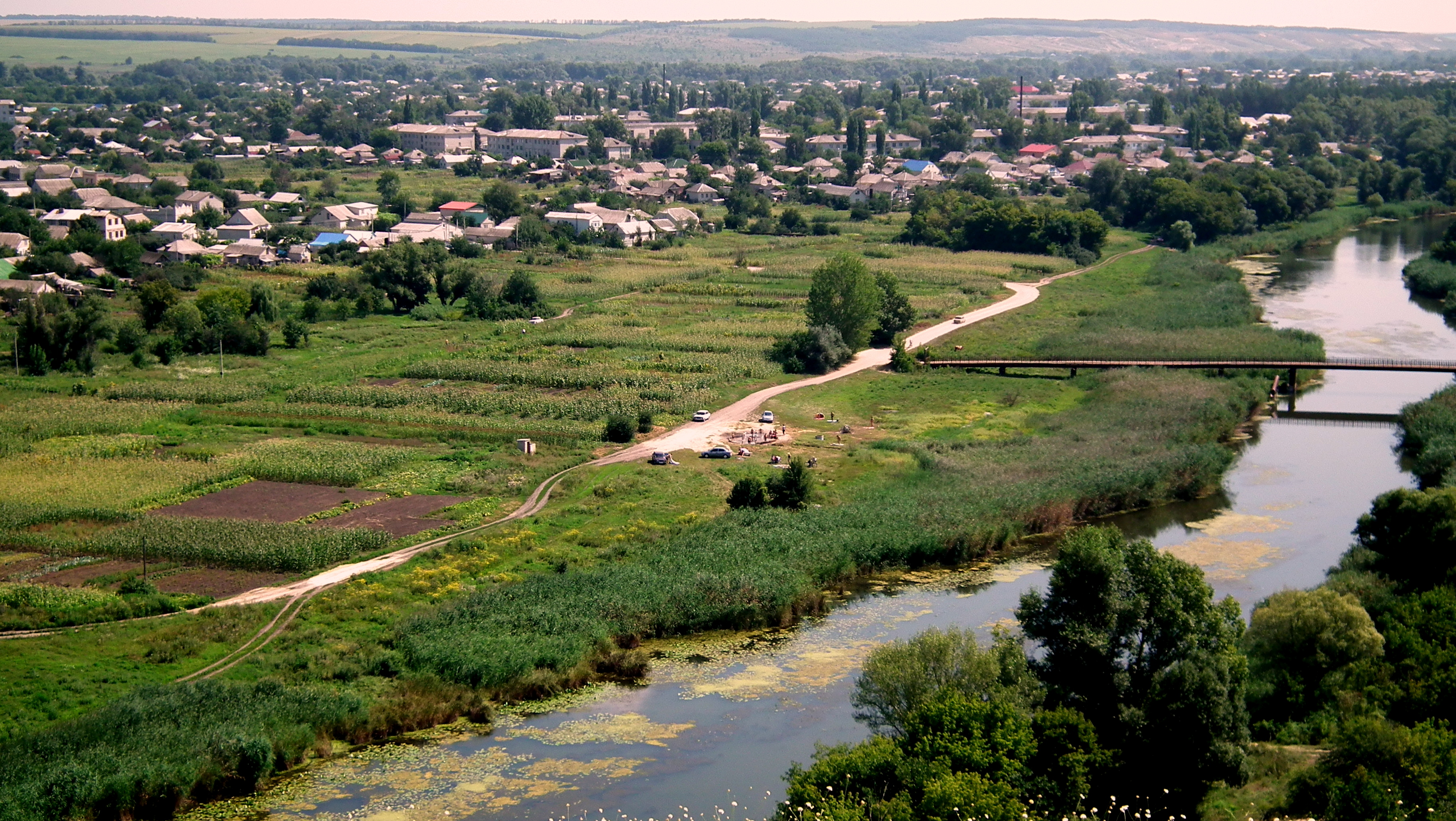
- Novopskov

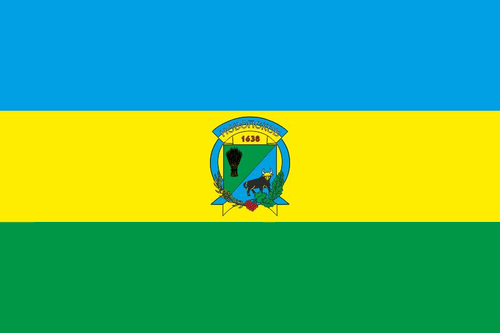
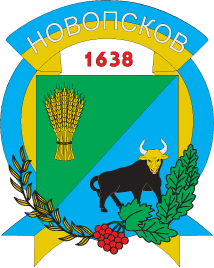
- Flag Coat of arms

- Location in Luhansk Oblast Location in Ukraine
- Coordinates: 49°32′18″N 39°06′07″E
- Country: Ukraine
- Oblast: Luhansk Oblast
- Raion: Starobilsk Raion
- Hromada: Novopskov settlement hromada

Government
  - Mayor: Vadym Hayev

Population (2022)
  - Total: 9,392
- Time zone: UTC+2 (EET)
  - Summer (DST): UTC+3 (EEST)

Novopskov (Ukrainian and Russian: Новопсков) is a rural settlement in the Starobilsk Raion of Luhansk Oblast in Ukraine. It is located on the Aidar, a left tributary of the Donets, in the basin of the Don. Population: 9,392 (2022 estimate) Prior to 2020, it was the administrative centre of the former Novopskov Raion.

On 19 September 2024, the Verkhovna Rada voted to rename Novopskov to Aidar as a part of the derussification campaign.

== Economy ==
=== Transportation ===
Bilokurakyne is connected by road with Starobilsk where it has further access to Highway H26 ro Svatove and Bilovodsk, as well as to Highway H21 to Luhansk. However, the section between Shchastia and Luhansk is controlled by the Luhansk People's Republic, and free movement from Shchastia to Luhansk is impossible.

The closest railway station is in Starobilsk, on a railway line which is currently disconnected from the rest of the railway network in Ukraine. To the south, it extends to Kondrashivska Nova, in Stanytsia Luhanska, and to the north it crosses the border to Russia, and further runs to Valuyki, Belgorod Oblast.

== Demographics ==
According to the 2001 Ukrainian census, the town had a population of 9,952. The linguistic composition was as follows:

Native languages in Novopskov
| Languages | percent |
| Ukrainian | 84.4% |
| Russian | 15.4% |
| Armenian | 0.1% |
| others | 0.1% |
