= Rural settlement (Ukraine) =

Type of populated place in Ukraine

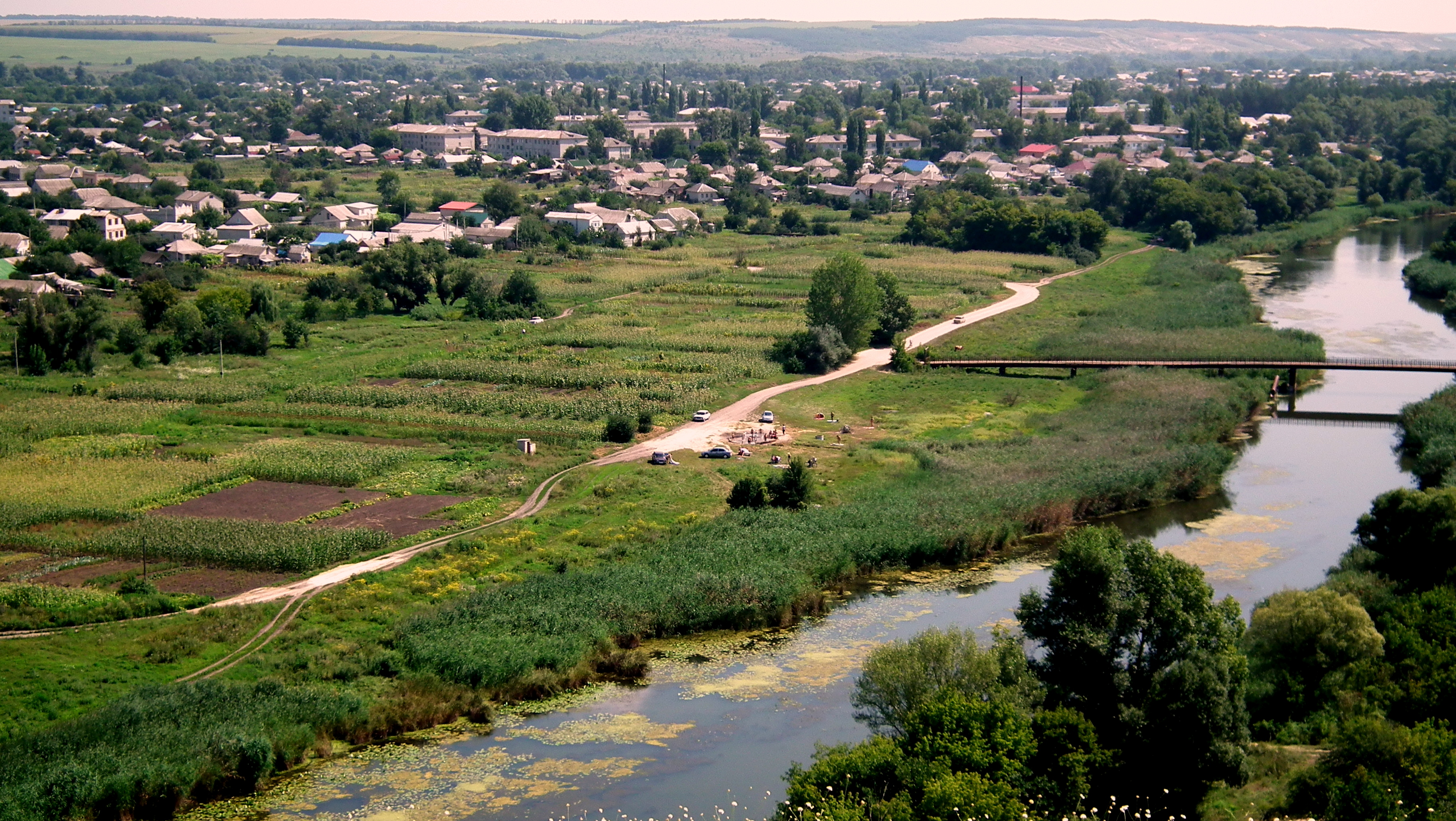
Aidar, a rural settlement in Luhansk Oblast, Ukraine

In Ukraine, a rural settlement or selyshche (Ukrainian: селище, lit. 'settlement') is a type of populated place in Ukraine larger than a village though smaller than a city.

In the administrative-territorial system of Ukraine, the term selyshche used to have a double meaning. Unlike other nomenclatures for populated places, in the Constitution of Ukraine, the term "urban-type settlement" was not clearly defined and was part of Soviet legislation that was conditionally grandfathered. In the Constitution of the Ukrainian SSR, the term urban-type settlements was mentioned simply as settlements. At the same time, there existed certain populated places, which were not classified as urban-type settlements, but were referred to as settlements. Purely for disambiguation, those particular populated places were informally referred to as rural settlements. The population of those settlements was often no more than 100 residents.

In 2023, a law was passed to finally eliminate any deviations or variations of the term settlement (e.g., urban-type settlement), clearly categorizing them, along with villages, as a type of rural populated place. The law also merged the two categories that existed de facto in Ukraine.

The 2023 law "About the order to solve separate issues of the administrative and territorial system of Ukraine" defines a rural settlement as a populated place with predominantly private housing and having a total population of at least 5,000 people.

According to the 2001 Ukrainian Census, there were 1,266 rural settlements in Ukraine. This excludes then-classified urban-type settlements, which were later abolished and reclassified as rural settlements in 2020.

== See also ==
- Populated places in Ukraine
