= Krasna Talivka (border checkpoint) =

Russia–Ukraine border crossing

Location
- Country: Ukraine
- Location: Krasna Talivka, Shchastia Raion
- Coordinates: 48.890375°N 39.856894°E

Krasna Talivka is a land border crossing between Ukraine and Russia on the Ukrainian side, near the village of Krasna Talivka, Shchastia Raion, Luhansk Oblast.

The crossing is situated on highway P 22. Across the border on the Russian side is the village of Voloshinoye, Millerovsky District, Rostov Oblast.

The type of crossing is automobile only, status - international and local. The types of transportation for automobile crossings are passenger and freight.

The port of entry is part of the Krasna Talivka customs post of Luhansk customs.

== See also ==
- Russia–Ukraine border
- State Border of Ukraine
