= Viktor Nazarenko =

Ukrainian general (born 1956)

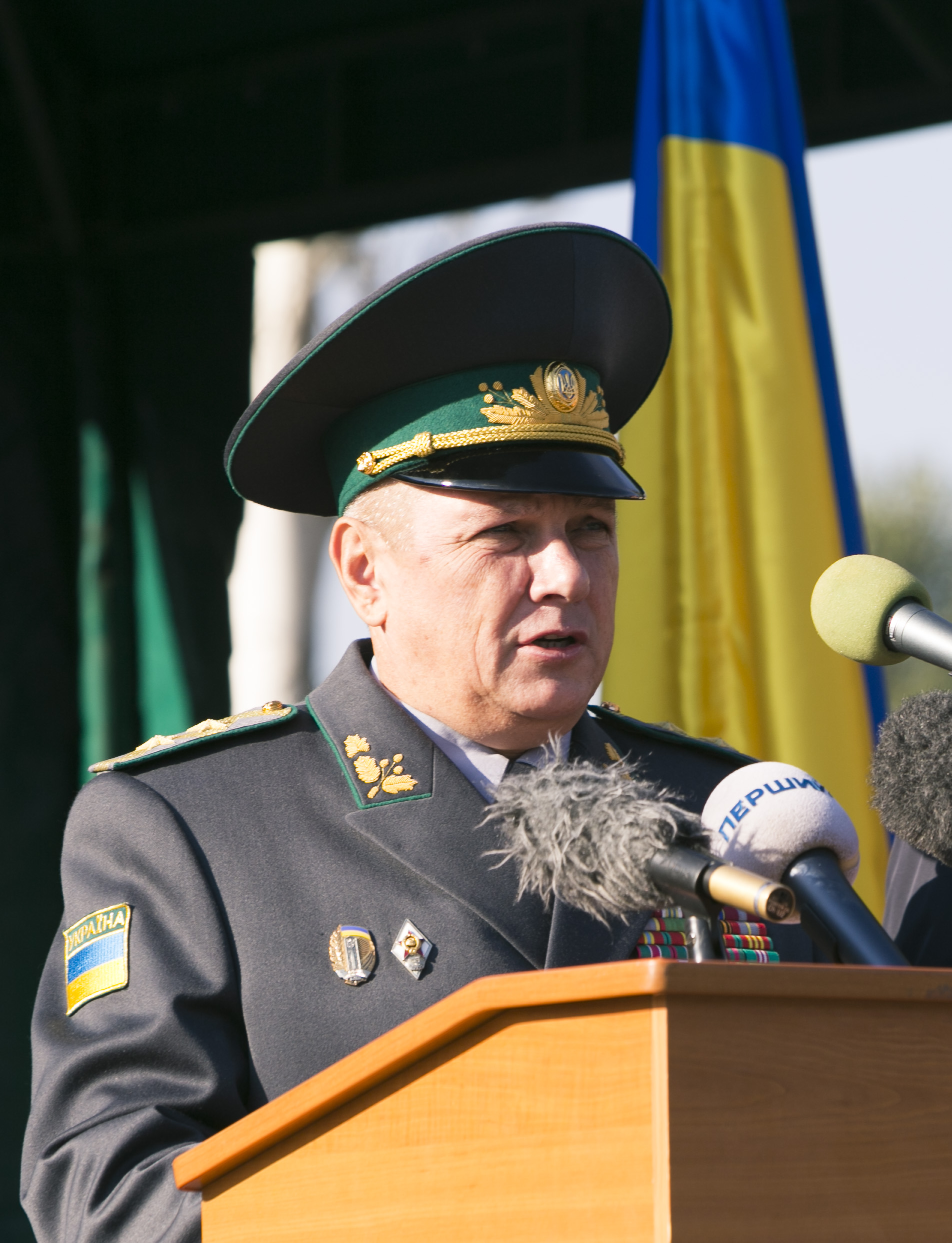
- Nazarenko in October 2014
- Born: 5 March 1956 (age 70); Minsk, Belarusian SSR, Soviet Union
- Military career
- Allegiance: Ukraine
- Branch: SBGS
- Service years: 1977–present
- Rank: General of the army
- Commands: Chief of the State Border Guard Service of Ukraine
- Conflicts: Soviet–Afghan War; Russo-Ukrainian War

Viktor Oleksandrovych Nazarenko (Ukrainian: Віктор Олександрович Назаренко, Belarusian: Віктар Назаранка; born 5 March 1956) is a Ukrainian military leader, veteran of the Soviet–Afghan War, and doctor of military sciences.

From October 2014 until July 2017 Nazarenko was the head of the State Border Guard Service of Ukraine.

== Biography ==
Born in Minsk, in 1977 Nazarenko graduated from the Higher Military-Political College in Lviv (today Sahaidachny Academy of Ground Forces) and then served in the Lviv Border Guard detachment of the Western Border Guard District. Beyween 1983 and 1986, he studied at the M. V. Frunze Military Academy (today Combined Arms Academy), after graduation from which he served in the Middle-Asian Border Guard District that at time was involved in the Soviet–Afghan War.

After the war and the fall of the Soviet Union, he returned to his native Lviv Border Guard detachment where in 1992–94 he served functions as a chief of staff. In 1994 to 1995, he was a chief of the separate border checkpoint "Prykarpattia". From 1995, Nazarenko was a staff officer for the Northwestern and then Southern regional administrations of the Border Guard Troops.

In 2000–2004 Nazarenko was a chief of the Azov-Black Sea Regional Administration (initially Crimean) of the State Border Guard Service of Ukraine and headed the operation to prevent the Russian intrusion to the Tuzla island in 2003.

On 23 October 2014, President Petro Poroshenko appointed Nazarenko head of the State Border Guard Service of Ukraine. Nazarenko resigned from this position on 25 July 2017 because of health issues. Four days earlier Nazarenko fainted during a press conference of President Poroshenko and Belarusian President Alexander Lukashenko. The State Border Service stated at the time that his health condition was satisfactory. On 25 July 2017 President Poroshenko conferred Nazarenko the rank of General of the army (the highest military rank).

== Awards and decorations ==
- Order of Bohdan Khmelnytsky
- Defender of the Motherland Medal
- Order of the Red Star
- Medal for Battle Merit
- Medal "For Distinction in Guarding the State Border of the USSR"
- Jubilee Medal "60 Years of the Armed Forces of the USSR"
- Medal "For Impeccable Service"
- Jubilee Medal "70 Years of the Armed Forces of the USSR"
- Grateful People of Afghanistan Medal
- Order of Friendship (Democratic Republic of Afghanistan)
