= Novopskov Raion =

Former subdivision of Luhansk Oblast, Ukraine

Novopskov Raion Новопсковський район
- Raion
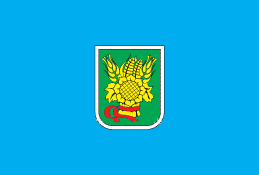
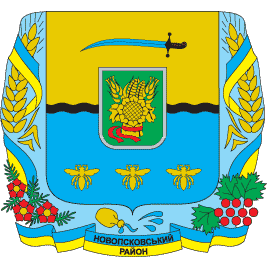
- Flag Coat of arms

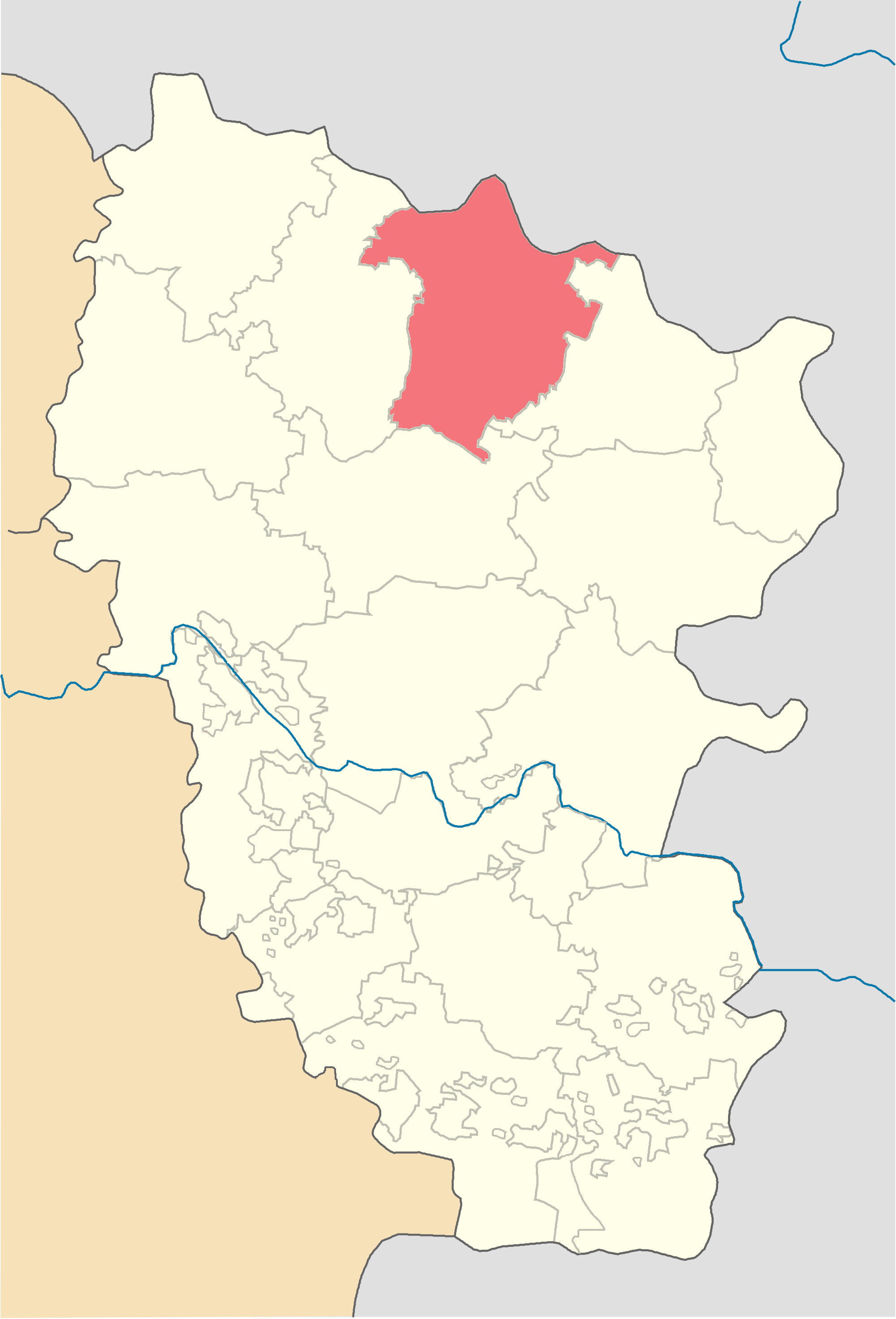
- Coordinates: 49°37′25″N 39°7′39″E
- Country: Ukraine
- Region: Luhansk Oblast
- Established: 1923
- Disestablished: 18 July 2020
- Admin. center: Novopskov
- Subdivisions: List: 0 — city councils; 2 — settlement councils; 15 — rural councils; Number of localities: 0 — cities; 2 — urban-type settlements; 36 — villages; 1 — rural settlements

Government
  - Governor: Borys Lebedev

Area
  - Total: 1,623 km^{2} (627 sq mi)

Population (2020)
  - Total: 33,173 ▼
  - Density: 20.44/km^{2} (52.94/sq mi)
- Time zone: UTC+02:00 (EET)
  - Summer (DST): UTC+03:00 (EEST)
- Postal index: 292300 — 292355
- Area code: +7 85763
- Website: http://novopskov.su

Novopskov Municipal District Новопсковский муниципальный округ (Russian)
- District

Other transcription(s)
  - Ukrainian: Новопсковський район
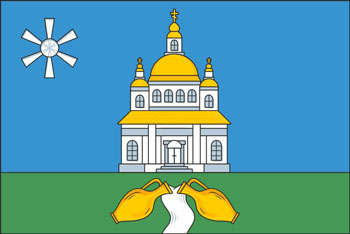
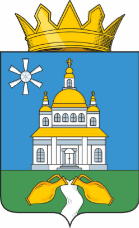
- Flag Coat of arms

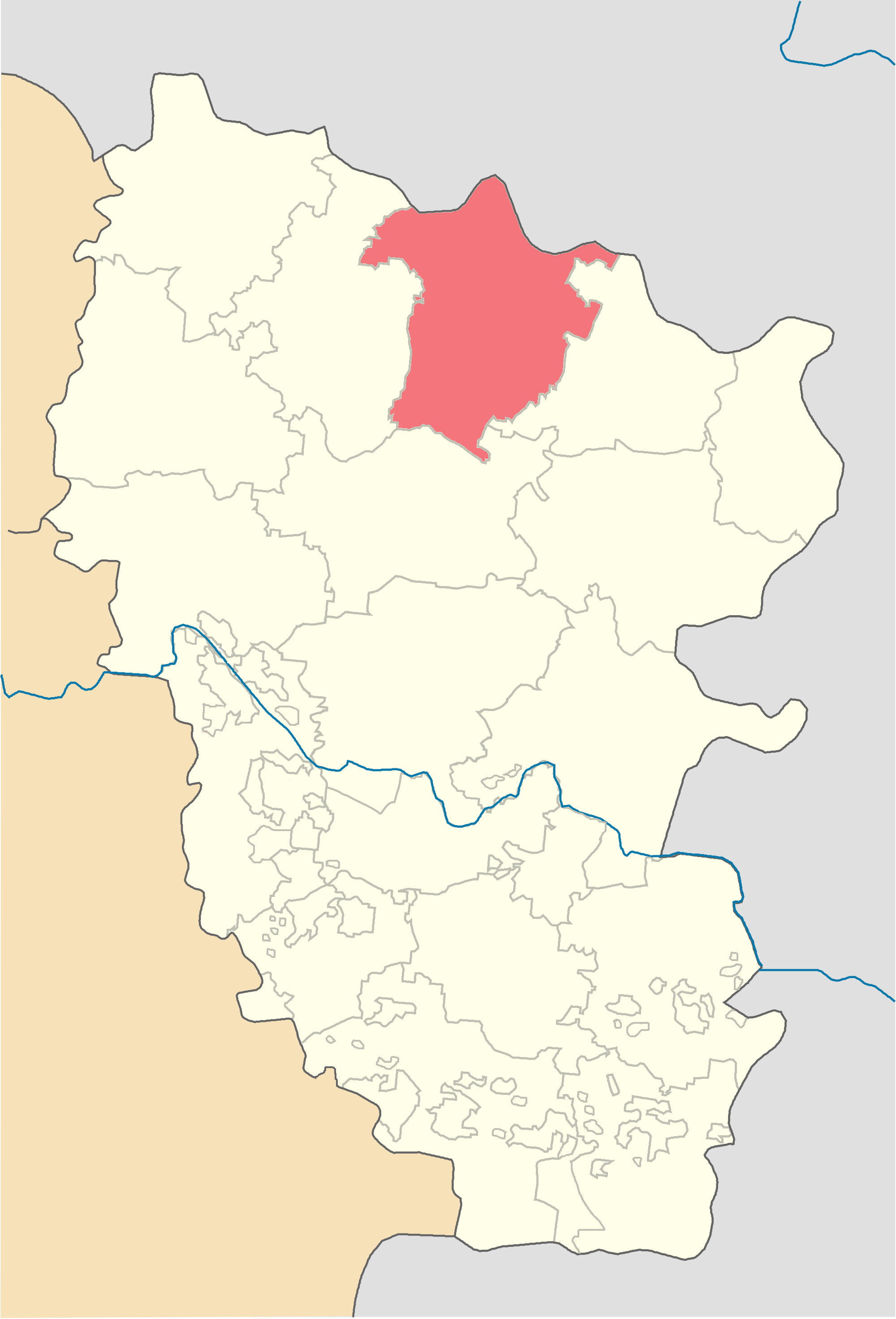
- Location of Novopskovsky District in the Luhansk People's Republic
- Coordinates: 49°37′25″N 39°7′39″E
- Country: Russia
- Federal subject: Luhansk People's Republic
- Established: 1923
- Administrative center: Novopskov

Area
  - Total: 1,623 km^{2} (627 sq mi)
- Website: https://novopskov.su

Novopskov Raion (Ukrainian: Новопсковський район) was a raion (district) in Luhansk Oblast in eastern Ukraine. The administrative center of the raion is the urban-type settlement of Novopskov. The raion was abolished on 18 July 2020 as part of the administrative reform of Ukraine, which reduced the number of raions of Luhansk Oblast to eight, of which only four were controlled by the government. The last estimate of the raion population was 33,173 (2020 est.).

After the proclamation of the separatist Luhansk People's Republic on 27 April 2014 the province Luhansk became a battlefield of the War in Donbass. Novopskov Raion stayed under Ukrainian governmental control. The separatist referendum on 11 May on independence was not held in the raion.

== Demographics ==
As of the 2001 Ukrainian census:

Ethnicity

- Ukrainians: 92.2%
- Russians: 6.9%
- Belarusians: 0.3%
