= Petropavlovka =

Petropavlovka may refer to:

- Petropavlovka, Russia, the name of several rural localities in Russia
- Dəlləkli, Quba, Azerbaijan, a village called Petropavlovka until 1992
- Sabirabad (city), Azerbaijan, called Petropavlovka until 1931
- Petropavlivka, Kupiansk Raion, Kharkiv Oblast, a village in Ukraine
- Petropavlivka, Dnipropetrovsk Oblast, a rural settlement in Ukraine
- Petropavlivka, Luhansk Oblast, a rural settlement in Ukraine
- Petropavlivka, Beryslav Raion, Kherson Oblast, a village in Ukraine
- Petropavlivka Raion, a former district of Ukraine

== See also ==
- Petropavlivka
