= Petropavlivka =

Petropavlivka may refer to the following places in Ukraine:

- Petropavlivka, Dnipropetrovsk Oblast
- Petropavlivka, Kupiansk Raion, Kharkiv Oblast
- Petropavlivka, Luhansk Oblast
- Petropavlivka, Beryslav Raion, Kherson Oblast
- Petropavlivka Raion

== See also ==
- Petropavlovka (disambiguation)
