= Dəlləkli =

Dəlləkli or Dellekli or Dellyakli may refer to:

- Dəlləkli, Masally, Azerbaijan
- Dəlləkli, Quba, Azerbaijan
- Dəlləkli, Tovuz, Azerbaijan
- Dəlləkli, Yardymli, Azerbaijan
- Dəlləkli, Zangilan, Azerbaijan
