= Malynove, Shchastia Raion, Luhansk Oblast =

Malynove Малинове
- Village
- Interactive map of Malynove
- Location of Malynove within Ukraine Malynove (Ukraine)
- Coordinates: 48.721667°N 39.423333°E
- Country: Ukraine
- Oblast: Luhansk Oblast
- Raion: Shchastia Raion
- Hromada: Stanytsia Luhanska settlement hromada
- Founded: 1953

Area
  - Total: 0.69 km^{2} (0.27 sq mi)
- Elevation: 74 m (243 ft)

Population (2001 census)
  - Total: 73
  - Density: 110/km^{2} (270/sq mi)
- Time zone: UTC+2 (EET)
  - Summer (DST): UTC+3 (EEST)
- Postal code: 93609
- Area code: +380 6472

Malynove (Ukrainian: Малинове; Russian: Малиновое) is a village in Stanytsia Luhanska settlement hromada, Shchastia Raion (district) in Luhansk Oblast of eastern Ukraine, at about 8.0 km NW from the centre of Stanytsia Luhanska.

The War in Donbas, that started in mid-April 2014, has brought along both civilian and military casualties.

== Demographics ==
In 2001 the settlement had 73 inhabitants. Native language as of the Ukrainian Census of 2001:

- Ukrainian — 21.92%
- Russian — 78.08%
