= Liubomyrivka, Luhansk Oblast =

Liubomyrivka Любомирівка
- Village
- Interactive map of Liubomyrivka
- Location of Liubomyrivka within Ukraine Liubomyrivka (Luhansk Oblast)
- Coordinates: 48°47′34″N 39°18′30″E
- Country: Ukraine
- Oblast: Luhansk Oblast
- Raion: Shchastia Raion
- Hromada: Nyzhnioteple rural hromada
- Founded: 1930

Area
  - Total: 1.75 km^{2} (0.68 sq mi)
- Elevation: 43 m (141 ft)

Population (2001 census)
  - Total: 734
  - Density: 419/km^{2} (1,090/sq mi)
- Time zone: UTC+2 (EET)
  - Summer (DST): UTC+3 (EEST)
- Postal code: 93632
- Area code: +380 6472

Liubomyrivka (Ukrainian: Любомирівка), formerly known as Artema (Ukrainian: Артема; Russian: Артёма) is a village in Nyzhnioteple rural hromada, Shchastia Raion of Luhansk Oblast in eastern Ukraine, situated at about 50 km north from the centre of Luhansk city, on the right bank of the Siverskyi Donets. Prior to 2020, it was part of the former Stanytsia-Luhanska Raion.

Siverskyi Donets has served as a natural separation line between the warring parties during the War in Donbass. A 15 minutes clash between governmental and pro-Russian forces, that took place near the village on 12 September 2016, at around 4:00 pm, resulted in two Ukrainian soldiers killed, five others wounded, and one unaccounted for in action. Later on the missing serviceman was accounted.

On 19 September 2024, the Verkhovna Rada voted to rename Artema to Liubomyrivka.

== Demographics ==
Native language as of the Ukrainian Census of 2001:

- Russian 76.98%
- Ukrainian 22.48%
