= Syze =

Syze Сизе
- Village
- Interactive map of Syze
- Location of Syze within Luhansk Oblast Syze (Ukraine)
- Coordinates: 48°35′56″N 39°37′42″E
- Country: Ukraine
- Oblast: Luhansk Oblast
- Raion: Shchastia Raion
- Hromada: Stanytsia Luhanska settlement hromada
- Status: 1950

Area
  - Total: 0.77 km^{2} (0.30 sq mi)
- Elevation: 39 m (128 ft)

Population (2001 census)
  - Total: 14
  - Density: 18/km^{2} (47/sq mi)
- Time zone: UTC+2 (EET)
  - Summer (DST): UTC+3 (EEST)
- Postal code: 93650
- Area code: +380 6472

Syze (Ukrainian: Сизе; Russian: Сизое) is a village in Stanytsia Luhanska settlement hromada, Shchastia Raion (district) in Luhansk Oblast of eastern Ukraine, at about 10 km SE from the centre of Stanytsia Luhanska, at about 2 km west from the Russian border.

Syze was founded by Don Cossacks in the 17th century.

== Demographics ==
In 2001 the village had 14 inhabitants. Native language as of the Ukrainian Census of 2001:

- Russian — 78.57%
- Ukrainian — 14.29%
- Belarusian — 0.80%
