= Lobacheve, Shchastia Raion, Luhansk Oblast =

Lobacheve Лобачеве
- Village
- Interactive map of Lobacheve
- Location of Lobacheve within Ukraine Lobacheve (Ukraine)
- Coordinates: 48.663611°N 39.119444°E
- Country: Ukraine
- Oblast: Luhansk Oblast
- Raion: Shchastia Raion
- Hromada: Shchastia urban hromada
- Founded: 1700

Area
  - Total: 1.567 km^{2} (0.605 sq mi)
- Elevation: 206 m (676 ft)

Population (2001 census)
  - Total: 250
  - Density: 160/km^{2} (410/sq mi)
- Time zone: UTC+2 (EET)
  - Summer (DST): UTC+3 (EEST)
- Postal code: 93734
- Area code: +380 6473

Lobacheve (Ukrainian: Лобачеве; Russian: Лобачёво) is a village in Shchastia urban hromada, Shchastia Raion (district) in Luhansk Oblast of eastern Ukraine, on the left bank of Siverskyi Donets.

The War in Donbas, that started in mid-April 2014, has brought along both civilian and military casualties. Two Ukrainian servicemen were killed and six wounded near the village in an ambush on 2 September 2015. One Ukrainian serviceman was wounded on 27 February 2017.
