= Kriakivka =

Kriakivka Кряківка
- Village
- Interactive map of Kriakivka
- Location of Kriakivka within Ukraine
- Coordinates: 48.771389°N 38.893889°E
- Country: Ukraine
- Oblast: Luhansk Oblast
- Raion: Shchastia Raion
- Hromada: Shchastia urban hromada
- Founded: 1674

Area
  - Total: 1.38 km^{2} (0.53 sq mi)
- Elevation: 44 m (144 ft)

Population (2001 census)
  - Total: 470
  - Density: 340/km^{2} (880/sq mi)
- Time zone: UTC+2 (EET)
  - Summer (DST): UTC+3 (EEST)
- Postal code: 93712
- Area code: +380 6473

Kriakivka (Ukrainian: Кряківка; Russian: Кряковка) is a village in Shchastia urban hromada, Shchastia Raion (district) in Luhansk Oblast of eastern Ukraine, at about 45 km NW from the centre of Luhansk.

== Demographics ==
In 2001 the settlement had 470 inhabitants. Native language as of the Ukrainian Census of 2001:

- Ukrainian — 17.02%
- Russian — 82.34%
- others — 0.64%
