= Trokhizbenka =

Trokhizbenka Трьохізбенка
- Village
- Interactive map of Trokhizbenka
- Location of Trokhizbenka within Ukraine Trokhizbenka (Ukraine)
- Coordinates: 48°45′34″N 38°57′48″E
- Country: Ukraine
- Oblast: Luhansk Oblast
- Raion: Shchastia Raion
- Hromada: Shchastia urban hromada
- Founded: 1674

Area
  - Total: 7.43 km^{2} (2.87 sq mi)
- Elevation: 50 m (160 ft)

Population (2001 census)
  - Total: 2,920
  - Density: 393/km^{2} (1,020/sq mi)
- Time zone: UTC+2 (EET)
  - Summer (DST): UTC+3 (EEST)
- Postal code: 93710
- Area code: +380 6473

Trokhizbenka (Ukrainian: Трьохізбенка; Russian: Трёхизбенка) is a village in Shchastia urban hromada, Shchastia Raion in Luhansk Oblast of eastern Ukraine, at about 25 km northwest of the centre of Luhansk city, on the left bank of the Siverskyi Donets.

== History ==
The settlement was founded by the Don Cossacks in the first half of the 17th century. It was the birthplace of Ataman Kondraty Bulavin, leader of the Bulavin Rebellion. Tsarist troops would raze the settlement for taking part in the rebellion, and would repopulate it with Russian settlers from Kursk and Voronezh Oblast.

=== War in Donbas ===
The village was occupied by pro-Russian troops in the spring of 2014. On 11 July 2014 Ukrainian troops took the village under their control and set up a checkpoint near the bridge over the river. The bridge was blown up on 3 September 2014. The war caused both civilian and military casualties. In 2021, the United Nations Development Programme rebuilt the police station of the village.

On 25 February 2022, the day after the Russian invasion of Ukraine, the Russian Ministry of Defense announced that Trokhizbenka had been captured as part an offensive by the forces of the Luhansk People's Republic, with combat being recorded.

The 36th Guards Combined Arms Army established a training ground at Trokhizbenka. This training ground was his by drones in May 2026.

== Demographics ==
Native language as of the Ukrainian Census of 2001:

- Russian: 98.49%
- Ukrainian 1.44%

== Sources ==
- Tronko, Petro Tymofiyovych, ed. (1968). Історія міст і сіл Української РСР. Луганська область [History of Cities and Villages of the Ukrainian SSR: Luhansk Oblast] (in Ukrainian). Kyiv: Main Editorial Office of the Ukrainian Soviet Encyclopedia, Academy of Sciences of the Ukrainian SSR.
