= Lopashchyne =

Lopashchyne Лопащине
- Village
- Interactive map of Lopashchyne
- Location of Lopashchyne within Ukraine Lopashchyne (Ukraine)
- Coordinates: 48°40′25″N 39°1′38″E
- Country: Ukraine
- Oblast: Luhansk Oblast
- Raion: Shchastia Raion
- Hromada: Shchastia urban hromada

Area
  - Total: 0.695 km^{2} (0.268 sq mi)
- Elevation: 42 m (138 ft)

Population (2001 census)
  - Total: 138
  - Density: 199/km^{2} (514/sq mi)
- Time zone: UTC+2 (EET)
  - Summer (DST): UTC+3 (EEST)
- Postal code: 93704
- Area code: +380 6473

Lopashchyne (Ukrainian: Лопащине), formerly Lopaskyne (Ukrainian: Лопаскине; Russian: Лопаскино), is a village in Shchastia urban hromada, Shchastia Raion (district) in Luhansk Oblast of eastern Ukraine, on the left bank of the Donets river.

On 18 June 2025, the Verkhovna Rada renamed the village to Lopashchyne to match Ukrainian language standards.

== Demographics ==
Native language as of the Ukrainian Census of 2001:

- Ukrainian 9.42%
- Russian 90.58%
