= Pobieda =

Pobieda (Ukrainian: Побєда) may refer to several places in Ukraine:

- Pobieda (urban-type settlement), Donetsk Oblast
- Pobieda, Amvrosiivka Raion, Donetsk Oblast
- Pobieda, Pokrovsk Raion, Donetsk Oblast
- Pobieda, Starobesheve Raion, Donetsk Oblast
- Pobieda, Kharkiv Oblast
- Pobieda, Luhansk Oblast
