= Staryi Aidar =

Staryi Aidar Старий Айдар
- Village
- Interactive map of Staryi Aidar
- Location of Sataryi Aidar within Luhansk Oblast Staryi Aidar (Ukraine)
- Coordinates: 48°43′40″N 39°9′5″E
- Country: Ukraine
- Oblast: Luhansk Oblast
- Raion: Shchastia Raion
- Hromada: Shchastia urban hromada
- Founded: 1645

Area
  - Total: 3.8 km^{2} (1.5 sq mi)
- Elevation: 77 m (253 ft)

Population
  - Total: 283
  - Density: 74/km^{2} (190/sq mi)
- Time zone: UTC+2 (EET)
  - Summer (DST): UTC+3 (EEST)
- Postal code: 93616
- Area code: +380 6472

Stary Aydar, Luhansk region, Ukraine

Staryi Aidar (Ukrainian: Старий Айдар; Russian: Старый Айдар) is a village in Shchastia urban hromada, Shchastia Raion (district) in Luhansk Oblast of eastern Ukraine, at about 20 km NW from the centre of Luhansk city.

The War in Donbas, that started in mid-April 2014, has brought along both civilian and military casualties. One Ukrainian serviceman was wounded in action near the village on 15 December 2016.

== Demographics ==
In 2001 the village had 633 inhabitants. Native language as of the Ukrainian Census of 2001:

- Ukrainian — 10.25%
- Russian 89.75%
