= Luhansk Power Station =

Power station in Shchastia, Luhansk, Ukraine

Luhansk power station
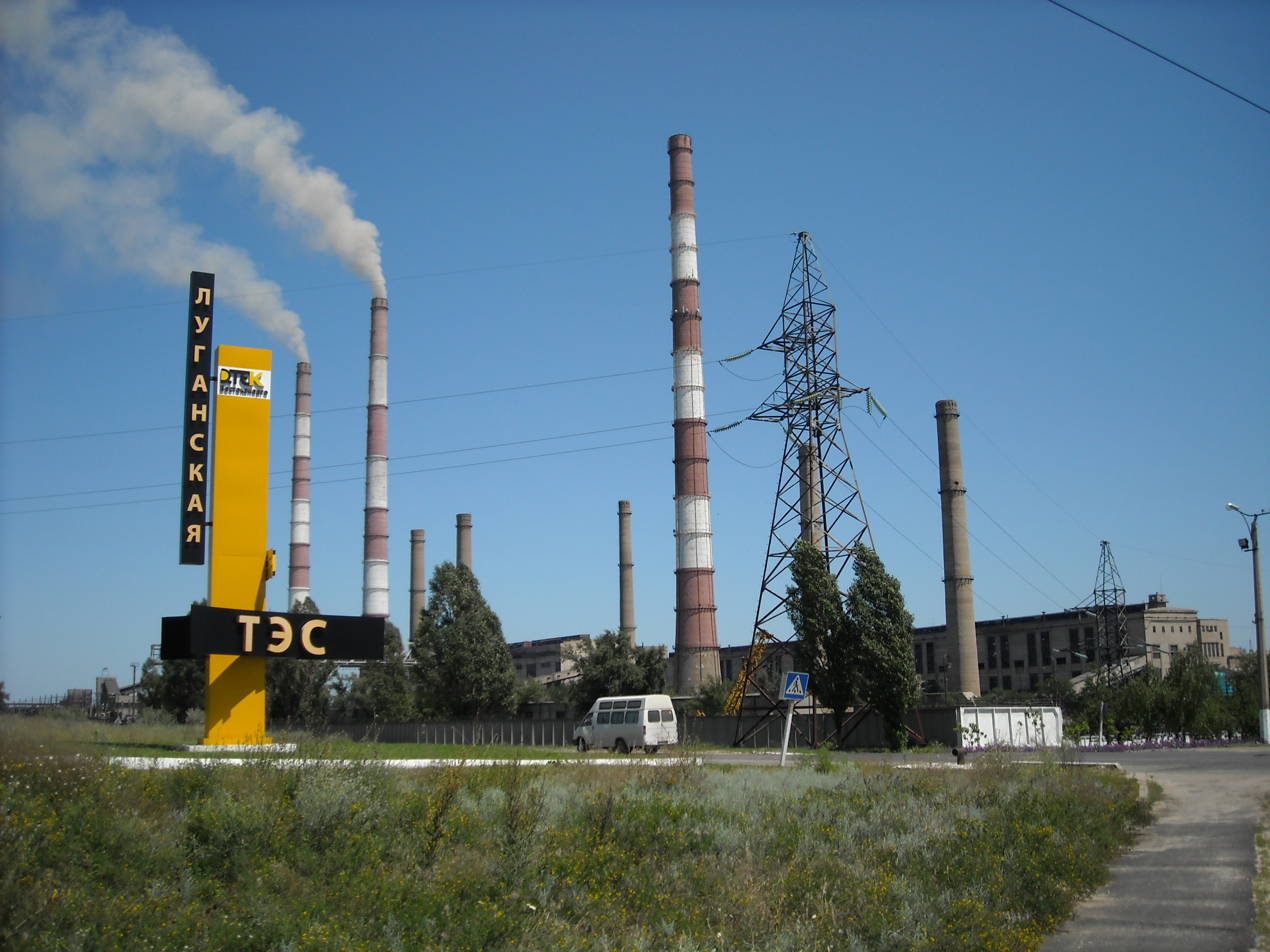
- Official name: Луганська ТЕС
- Country: Ukraine
- Location: Shchastia
- Coordinates: 48°44′52.1″N 39°15′44.6″E
- Status: Destroyed due to shelling, not operating
- Commission date: 1956
- Owner: DTEK Skhidenergo

Thermal power station
- Primary fuel: Coal

Power generation
- Units operational: 1 x 100 MW; 3 x 175 MW; 4 x 200 MW
- Make and model: TAGMET; LMZ; Electrotyazhmash
- Nameplate capacity: 1,425 MW

External links
- Website: skhidenergo.com.ua/separate-units/dtek-luganskaya-tpp/
- Commons: Related media on Commons

Luhansk power station (Ukrainian: Луганська ТЕС, romanized: Luhanska TES, formerly Luhanskaya GRES) is a thermal power station north of Shchastia, near Luhansk, Ukraine.

== History ==
It was built between 1950 and 1956 and its first generator was connected to the grid on 30 September 1956. In 1957, 4 turbines and 7 boilers went in service. In 1958, it was completed.

Between 1979 and 2004, Luhansk power station was modernized. It consists today of 4 units with 200 MW, 3 units of 175 MW, and 1 unit of 100 MW. The generator building of Luhansk power station, which has 3 250 metres (820 ft) tall chimneys, is 672 metres (2,205 ft) long.

=== Russo-Ukrainian War ===
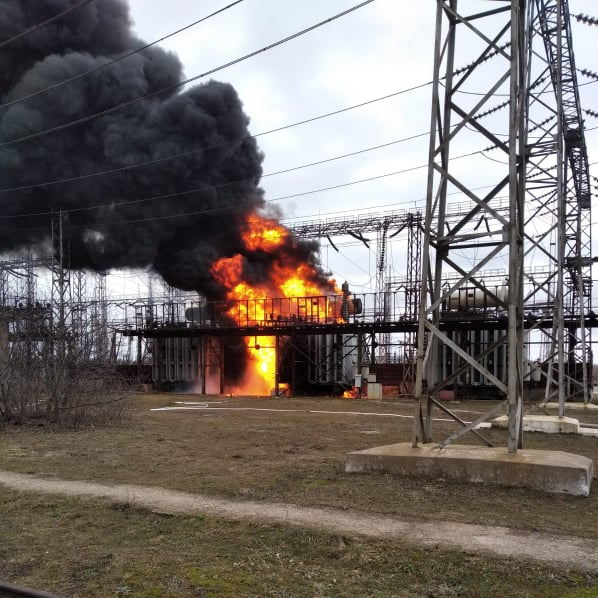
The power station after being shelled by Russian-backed forces, 22 February 2022

On 3 September 2014, Ukrainian Aidar Battalion commander Serhiy Melnychuk announced that they had mined the plant (which gives electricity to 98% of Luhansk Oblast), and that they will blow it up if the separatist forces advanced. On 17 September, part of the plant exploded due to combat in the zone, while firefighters couldn't act due to the fire and the mines planted.

In April 2017, power plant became synchronized with the Unified State Electric Power System of Ukraine via two 110 kV overhead lines, one from Svatove to Kurylivka, and another from Soledar to Bakhmut. As a result of damage to the 220 kV overhead line in northern Luhansk Oblast, the reliability of the power plant's output remained low by 2020.

The plant suspended work on 21 February 2022, head of the Luhansk Regional Administration Serhiy Haidai stated this was due to shelling by the Russian separatist forces in Donbas, and left local residents in Shchastia without water, power, and heat. The next day the plant was shelled again.

The plant completely shut down due to shelling and was permanently damaged beyond repair.

== See also ==
- List of power stations in Ukraine
