= Shchastia urban hromada =

Shchastia urban hromada Щастинська міська громада
- Hromada
- Interactive map of Shchastia urban hromada
- Country: Ukraine
- Oblast: Luhansk Oblast
- Raion: Shchastia Raion

Area
  - Total: 409.2 km^{2} (158.0 sq mi)

Population (2020)
  - Total: 20,922
  - Density: 51.13/km^{2} (132.4/sq mi)
- Settlements: 11
- Cities: 1
- Villages: 9
- Towns: 1

Shchastia urban hromada (Ukrainian: Щастинська міська громада) is a hromada of Ukraine, located in Shchastia Raion, Luhansk Oblast. Its administrative center is the city Shchastia.

It has an area of 409.2 square kilometres (158.0 mi^{2}) and a population of 20,922, as of 2020.

The hromada contains 11 settlements: 1 city (Shchastia), 1 rural settlement (Petropavlivka), and 9 villages:

- Trokhizbenka
- Kriakivka
- Lobacheve
- Lopashchyne
- Orikhove-Donetske
- Peredilske
- Heivka
- Staryi Aidar
- Voitove

== See also ==
- List of hromadas of Ukraine
