= Petropavlivka, Luhansk Oblast =

Urban locality in Luhansk Oblast, Ukraine

Petropavlivka Петропавлівка
- Rural settlement
- Location of Petropavlivka within Ukraine Petropavlivka (Ukraine)
- Coordinates: 48°48′16″N 39°15′46″E
- Country: Ukraine
- Oblast: Luhansk Oblast
- Raion: Shchastia Raion
- Hromada: Shchastia urban hromada
- Founded: 1684
- Elevation: 44 m (144 ft)

Population (2022)
  - Total: 4,577
- Time zone: UTC+2 (EET)
  - Summer (DST): UTC+3 (EEST)
- Postal code: 93613
- Area code: +380 6472

Petropavlivka (Ukrainian: Петропавлівка) is a rural settlement in Shchastia urban hromada, Shchastia Raion (district) in Luhansk Oblast of eastern Ukraine. Population: 4,577 (2022 estimate)

Until 18 July 2020, Petropavlivka was located in Stanytsia-Luhanska Raion. The raion was abolished in July 2020 as part of the administrative reform of Ukraine, which reduced the number of raions of Luhansk Oblast to eight, of which only four were controlled by the government. The area of Popasna Raion was merged into Shchastia Raion.

== Demographics ==
Native language distribution as of the Ukrainian Census of 2001:

- Ukrainian: 30.71%
- Russian: 68.84%
- Others 0.22%
