= Nyzhnoteple rural hromada =

Nyzhnoteple rural hromada Нижньотеплівська селищна громада
- Hromada
- Interactive map of Nyzhnoteple rural hromada
- Country: Ukraine
- Oblast: Luhansk Oblast
- Raion: Shchastia Raion

Area
  - Total: 492.4 km^{2} (190.1 sq mi)

Population (2020)
  - Total: 7,149
  - Density: 14.52/km^{2} (37.60/sq mi)
- Settlements: 12
- Villages: 12

Nyzhnoteple rural hromada (Ukrainian: Нижньотеплівська селищна громада) is a hromada of Ukraine, located in Shchastia Raion, Luhansk Oblast. Its administrative center is the village of Nyzhnoteple.

It has an area of 492.4 square kilometres (190.1 mi^{2}) and a population of 7,149, as of 2020.

The hromada contains 12 settlements, which are all villages:

- Krepy
- Liubomyrivka
- Mykhailivka
- Nyzhnii Minchenok
- Nizhnoteple
- Pischane
- Serednoteple
- Sotenne
- Teple
- Velyka Chernihivka
- Verkhnii Minchenok
- Verkhnobohdanivka

== See also ==
- List of hromadas of Ukraine
