= Ihor Shopin =

Ukrainian footballer

Personal information
- Full name: Ihor Viktorovych Shopin
- Date of birth: 15 June 1978 (age 48)
- Place of birth: Novoaidar, Soviet Union (now Ukraine)
- Height: 1.79 m (5 ft 10 in)
- Position: Midfielder

Senior career*
Years	Team	Apps	(Gls)
1995–1998	Zorya Luhansk	90	(21)
1998–2004	Metalist Kharkiv	130	(11)
1998–2002	→ Metalist-2 Kharkiv	19	(3)
2004–2005	Zorya Luhansk	29	(10)
2005–2006	Kharkiv	34	(3)
2007	Ihroservice Simferopol	3	(0)
2007–2009	Zakarpattia Uzhhorod	46	(0)
2010	Shakhtar Sverdlovsk	1	(0)
- * Club domestic league appearances and goals

Ihor Viktorovych Shopin (Ukrainian: Ігор Вікторович Шопін; born 15 June 1978) is a Ukrainian footballer. Shopin played for FC Zakarpattia Uzhhorod for three years and transferred to Shakhtar Sverdlovsk after the Ukrainian Premier League 2009-10.
