= Shchastia =

City in Luhansk Oblast, Ukraine

Shchastia Щастя
- City
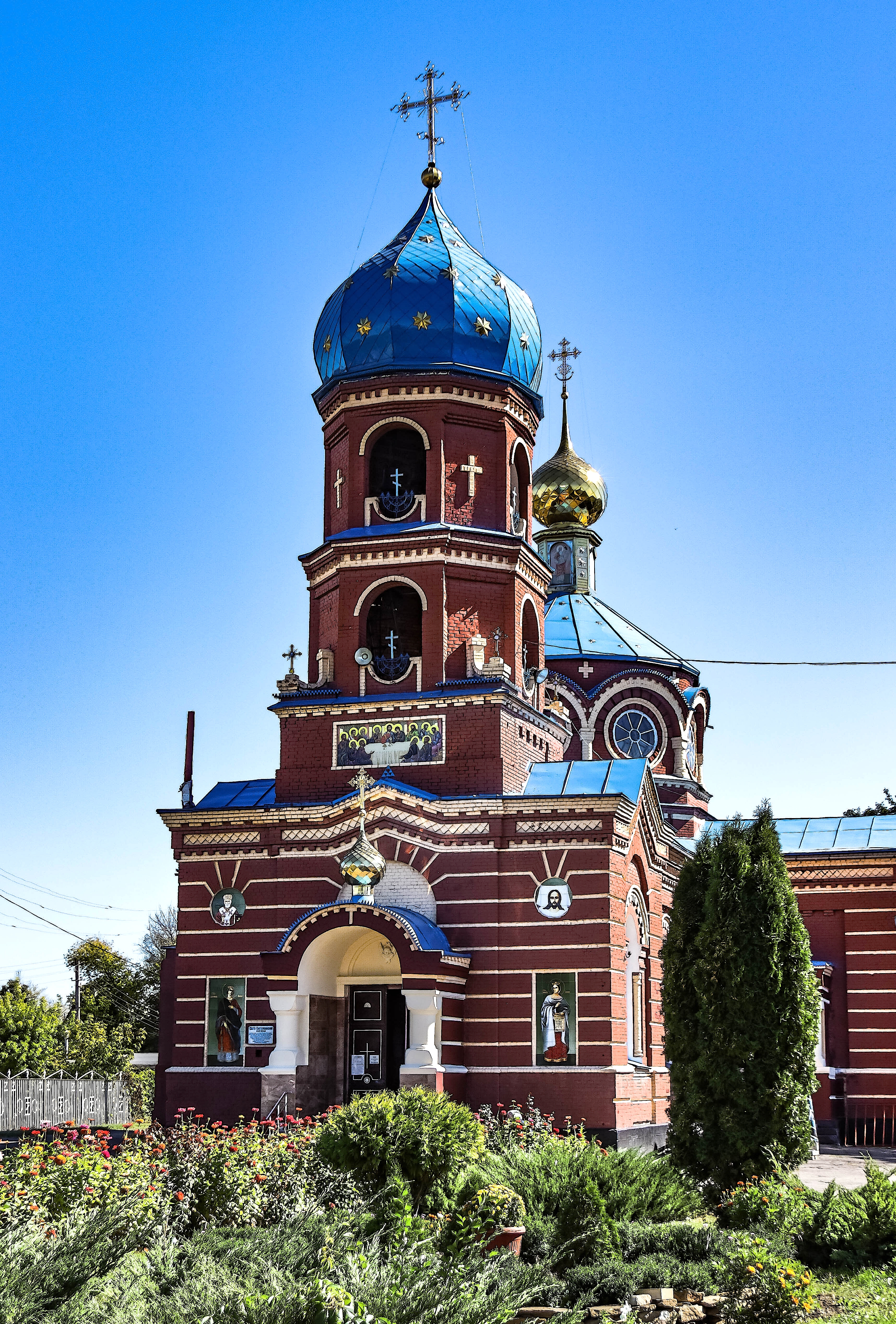
- Saint Catherine church in Shchastia

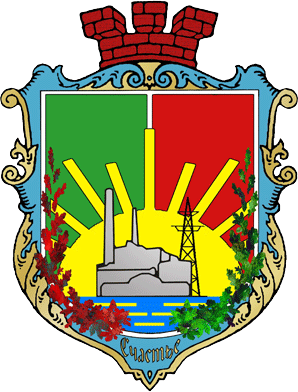
- Coat of arms
- Interactive map of Shchastia
- Location within Ukraine Location within Luhansk Oblast
- Country: Ukraine
- Oblast: Luhansk Oblast
- Raion: Shchastia Raion
- Hromada: Shchastia urban hromada
- Founded: 1754
- City status: 1963
- Control: Russia

Population (2022)
  - Total: 11,411
- Area code: (+380)
- Vehicle registration: BB / 13
- Climate: Dfa

Shchastia (Ukrainian: Щастя, pronounced [ˈʃtʃɑsʲtʲɐ], lit. 'Happiness'; Russian: Счастье, romanized: Schastye) is a city, the former de jure administrative center of Shchastia Raion in the Luhansk Oblast (province), in eastern Ukraine. Its population was reported as 11,411 (2022 estimate).

The Luhansk Power Station, a large power plant built in the 1950s, is located north of Shchastia. The town of Shchastia is situated on the Donets river. During the 2014 pro-Russian unrest in Ukraine, the city became a key site of fighting, but remained under government control until the 2022 Russian invasion of Ukraine. After declaring its annexation of the region in 2022, Russia has claimed the city.

== History ==
=== Early history ===
The village of Shchastia was founded in 1754.

During World War II, it was occupied by Germany from 1942 to 1943.

In 1953, construction began on the Luhansk power station. Shchastia received town status in 1963.

=== Russo-Ukrainian War ===
==== War in Donbas ====
In 2014, Shchastia was controlled by the separatist Luhansk People's Republic from late April 2014 until the Ukrainian Army retook the city on 14 June 2014. It was mainly retaken by the volunteer fighters of the Aidar Battalion who, according to Amnesty International, then with "virtually no oversight or control" committed acts of violent abuse towards civilians in Shchastia and nearby cities, as did the separatist forces. According to Shchastia residents, this behaviour continued until Aidar was incorporated into the Ukrainian Army in spring 2015.

On 5 August 2014, a monument of Vladimir Lenin was removed from the city of Shchastia.

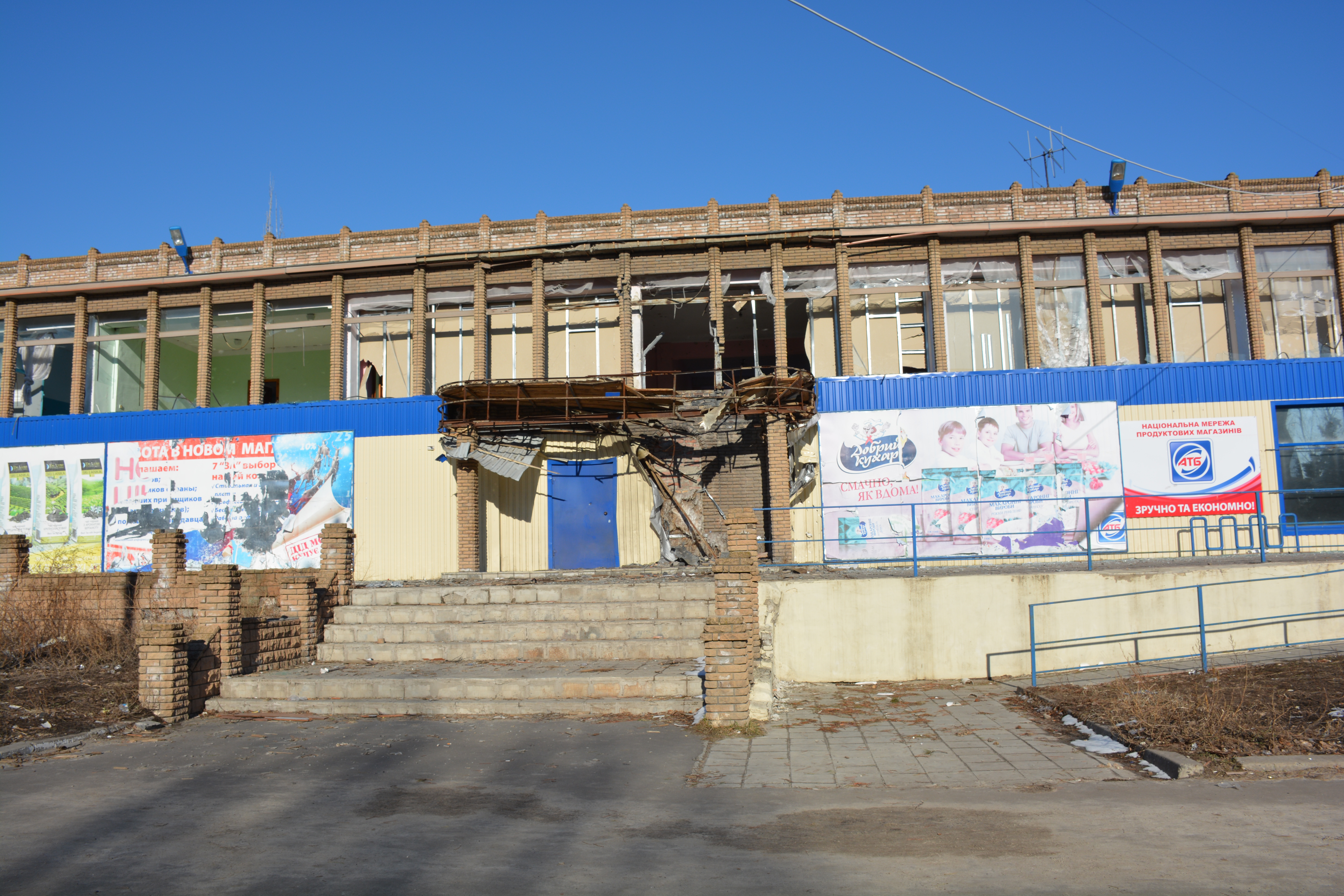
War damages in 2015

To facilitate the governance of Luhansk Oblast during the war in Donbas, the Verkhovna Rada on 7 October 2014 made some changes in the administrative divisions so that the localities in the government-controlled areas were grouped into districts. In particular, Shchastia was transferred from Luhansk Municipality to Novoaidar Raion.

In July 2020, as part of the reform of administrative divisions in Ukraine, Novoaidar Raion was absorbed into the newly created Shchastia Raion. Shchastia was made the administrative center of the new raion, although Novoaidar served as the de facto administrative center because it was located farther from the line of contact in the Donbas War. By 2022, the town's population had halved to 7,000 in comparison to pre-war numbers.

==== Full-scale Russian invasion of Ukraine ====
In the days before the invasion, the town was shelled and fired upon by Russian-backed forces more than 900 times with incoming munitions from tanks, artillery, mortars, rocket-propelled grenades, and small arms. The strikes mostly targeted Ukrainian military installations on the outskirts of Shchastia and the Luhansk Power Plant, damaging buildings, water and electrical lines.

On 24 February 2022, the first day of the 2022 Russian invasion of Ukraine, Shchastia came under attack by Russian forces and was quickly occupied. On the second day of the war, the governor Serhiy Haidai said that 80% of the town has been destroyed in the invasion. According to locals 90% of all houses were destroyed by shelling.

== Demographics ==
Ethnic groups as of the 2001 Ukrainian census:

Ethnic groups in Shchastia
	percent
Russians	49.32%
Ukrainians	48.29%
Belarusians	0.58%
Moldovans	0.11%
Armenians	0.10%
Jews	0.10%

Native language as of the Ukrainian Census of 2001:

Native languages in Shchastia
	percent
Russian	88.0%
Ukrainian	11.2%
others	0.8%

== Gallery ==
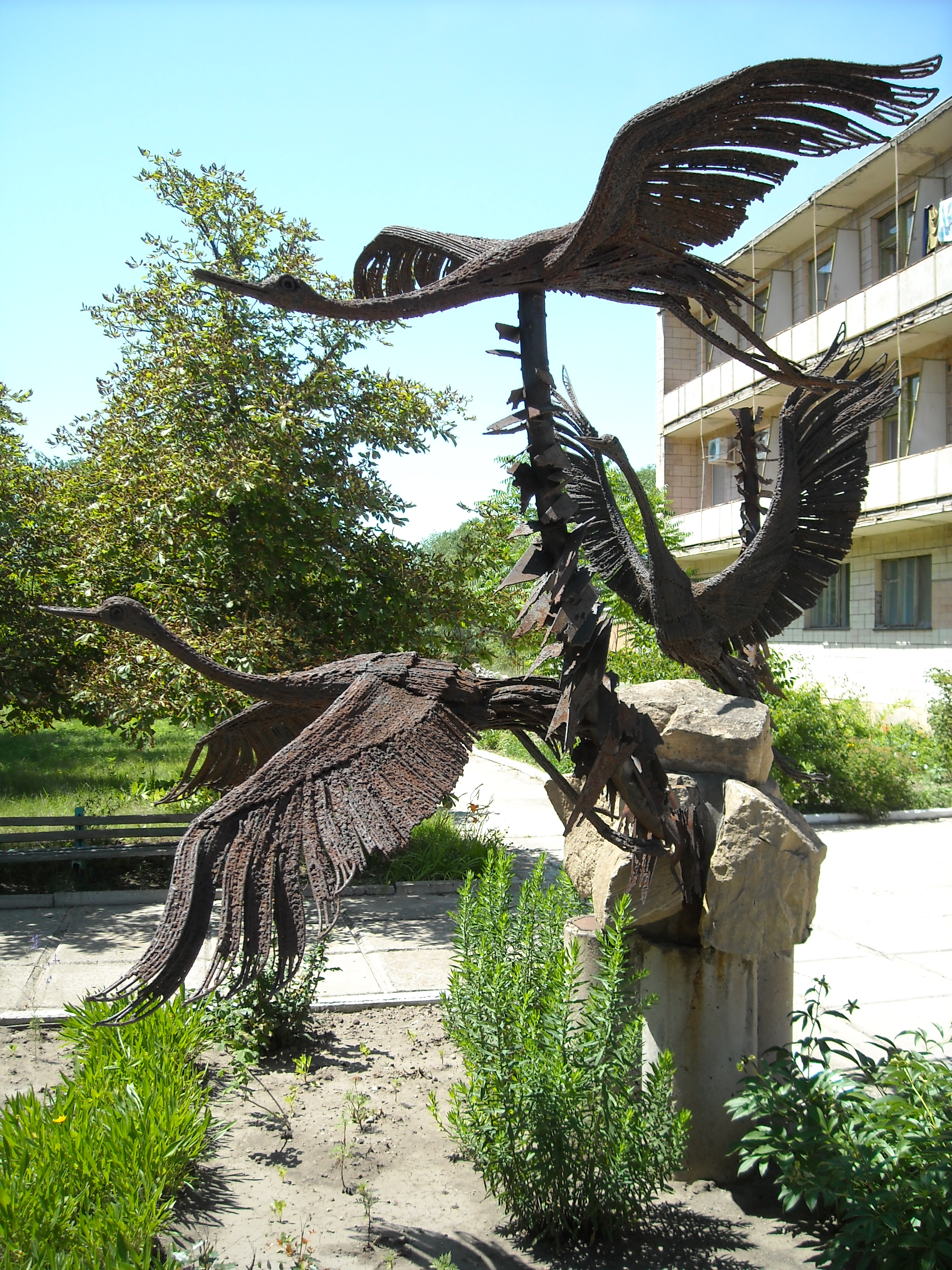
Cranes monument

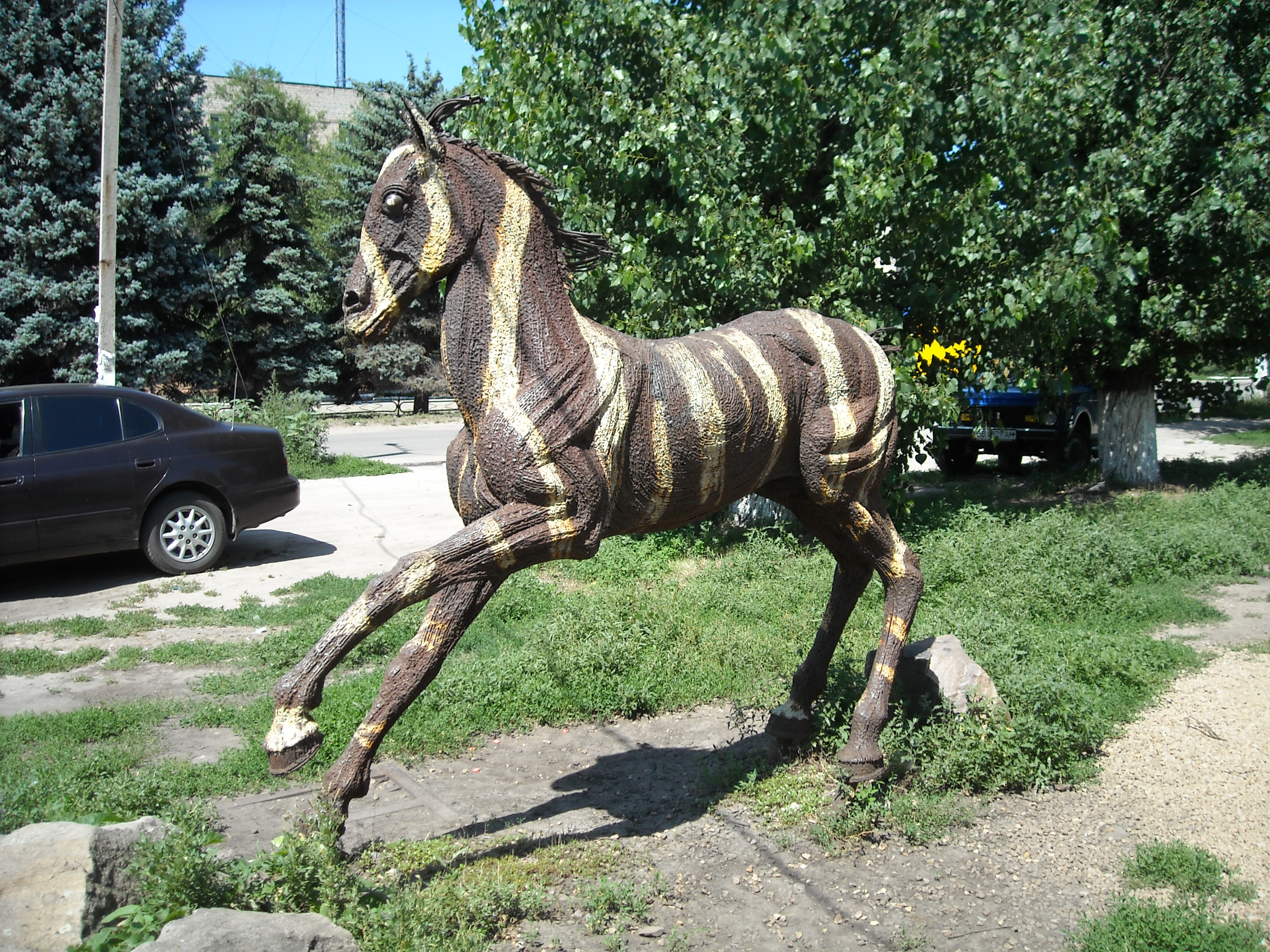
Horse monument

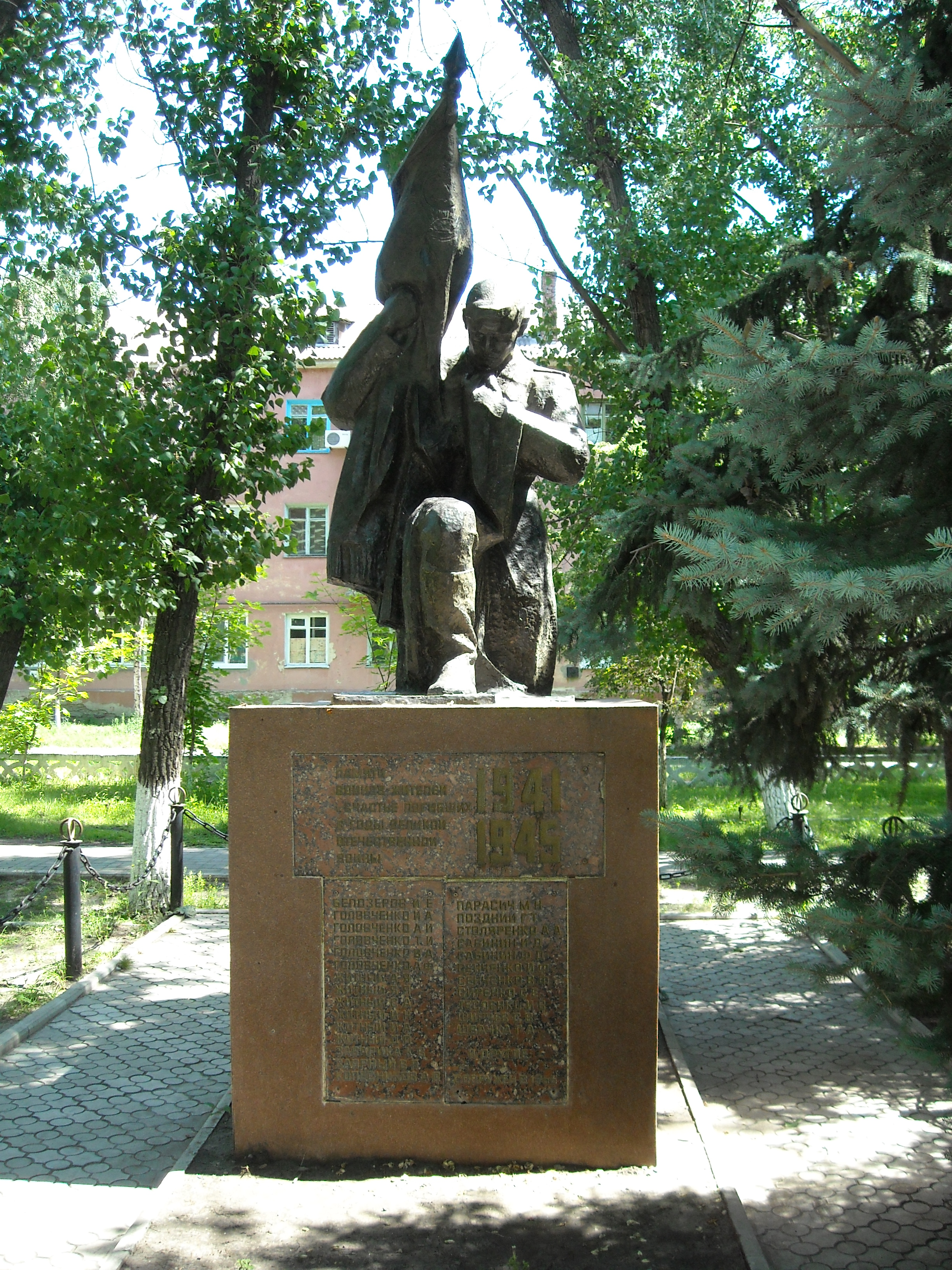
WW2 monument in Shchastia

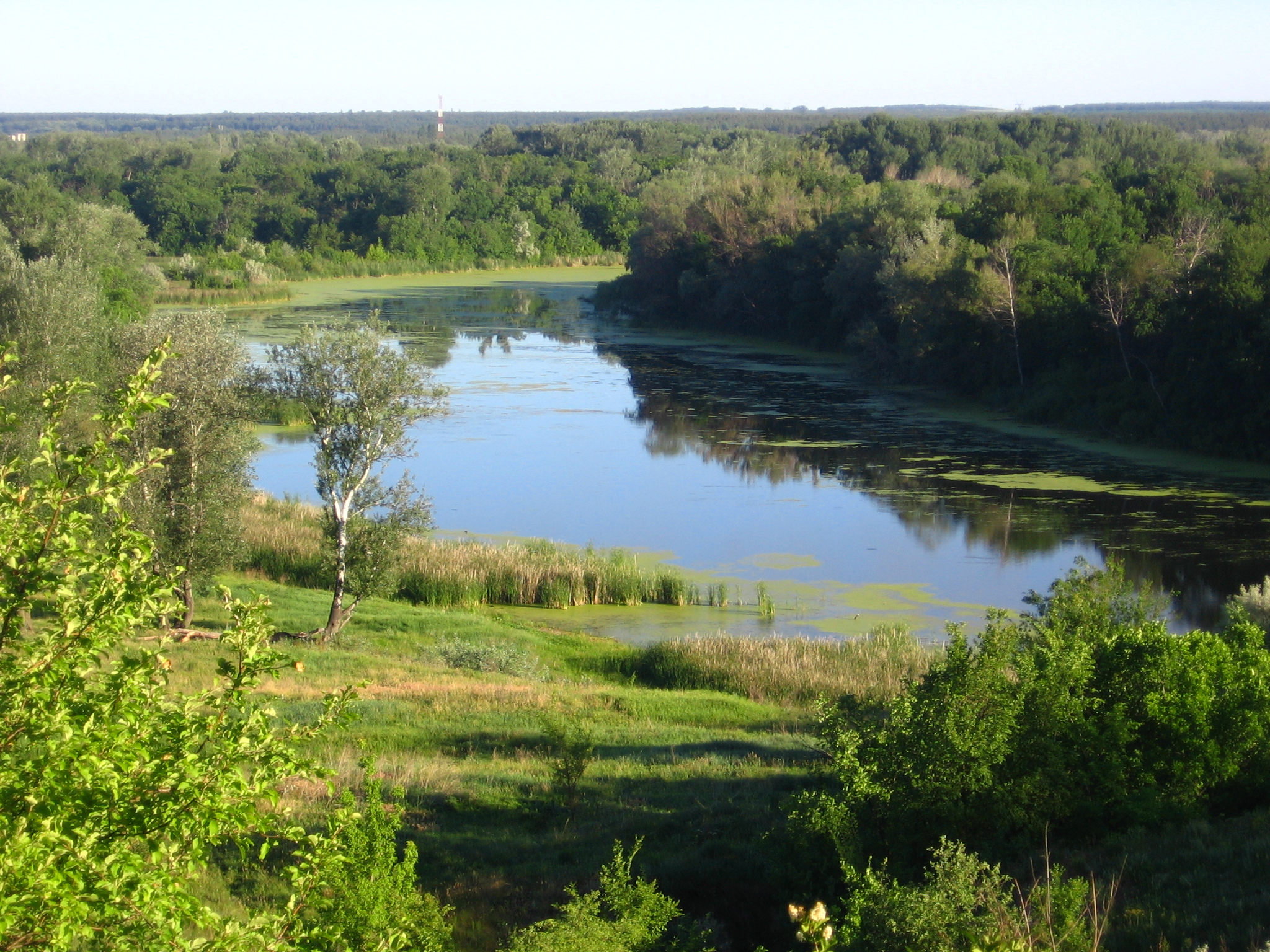
Mertvy Donets River near Shchastia

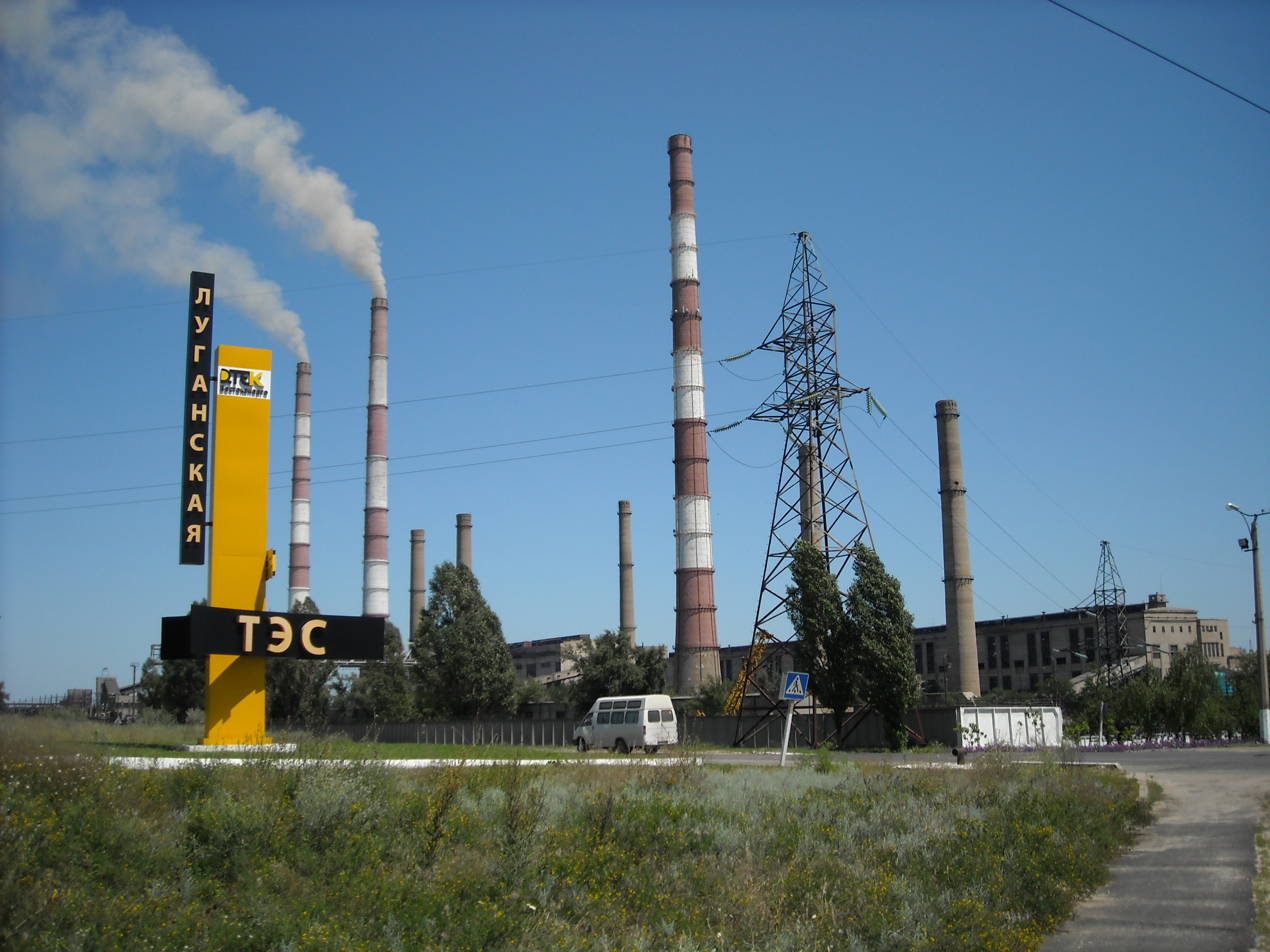
Luhansk thermal power plant
