= Stanytsia Luhanska kindergarten bombing =

Attack on school in Ukraine

- Part of the Prelude to the Russian invasion of Ukraine
Date	17 February 2022
Location	Stanytsia Luhanska

Belligerents
Ukraine	Russian backed separatists: Luhansk People's Republic

Casualties and losses
- 3 wounded

The Stanytsia Luhanska kindergarten bombing was an event directly preceding the 2022 Russian Invasion of Ukraine. It was shelling of a kindergarten in Stanytsia Luhanska on 17 February 2022 which injured three people, and left half the town without electricity. It was performed by separatists shortly before the invasion.

== Overview ==
On 17 February 2022, a mortar shell landed in a kindergarten in Stanytsia Luhanska, Luhansk Oblast, Ukraine. The Luhansk People's Republic (Sergey Kozlov) accused Ukraine of using mortars, grenade launchers, rocketeers or/and a machine gun along its contact line, possibly near Stanytsia Luhanska. Ukrainian sources claimed LPR and Russian positions fired from somewhere near Mykolaivka or Luhansk towards Stanytsia Luhanska. This was during the prelude before the Russian invasion of Ukraine.

On February 26, the settlement was occupied by Russian Ground Forces as part of the 2022 Russian invasion of Ukraine.

== Reactions ==
Josep Borrell, the High Representative of the Union for Foreign Affairs and Security Policy of the European Union (EU), stated that "such indiscriminate shelling of civilian infrastructures is totally unacceptable and represents a clear violation of the cease-fire and the Minsk agreements". Borrell also expressed the EU's support for Ukraine's internationally recognized borders and called for unrestricted access for the OSCE Special Monitoring Mission to Ukraine in the whole of the territory of Ukraine, including Russian-occupied areas.

The Embassy of the United States in Kyiv called the attack a "heinous Russian violation of the Minsk Agreements" which demonstrated "Russia's disregard for Ukrainian civilians on both sides of the line of contact". The embassy also stated that "The aggressor in Donbas is clear - Russia".

== See also ==
- War crimes during the Russo-Ukrainian War
