= Novoaidar Raion =

Former subdivision of Luhansk Oblast, Ukraine

Novoaidar Raion Новоайдарський район
- Raion
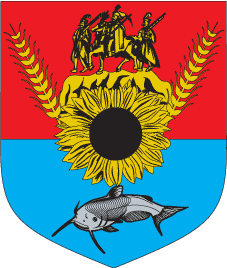
- Flag Coat of arms

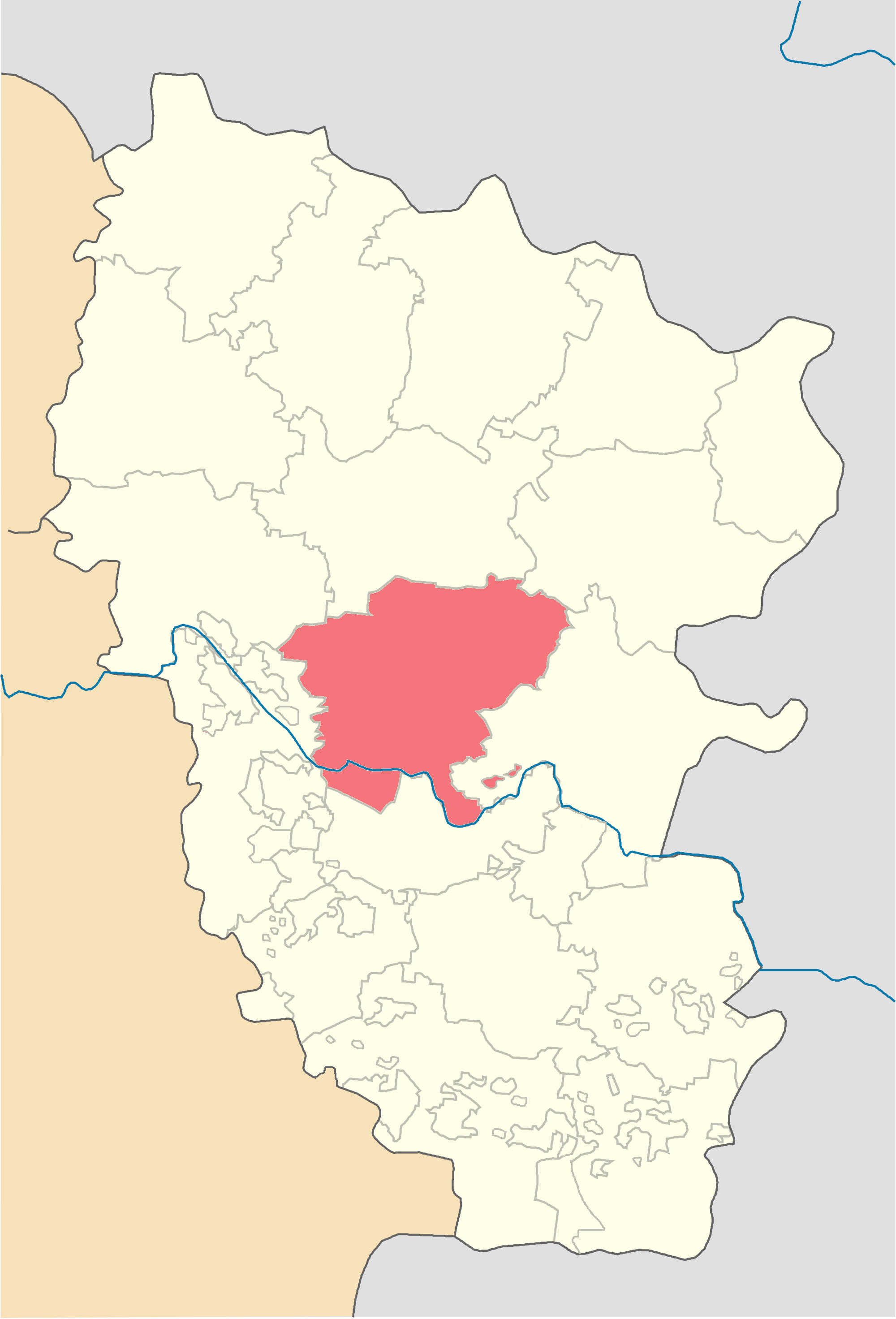
- Coordinates: 48°57′34″N 38°58′32″E
- Country: Ukraine
- Region: Luhansk Oblast
- Established: 1923
- Disestablished: 18 July 2020
- Admin. center: Novoaidar
- Subdivisions: List: 0 — city councils; 1 — settlement councils; 14 — rural councils; Number of localities: 0 — cities; 1 — urban-type settlements; 36 — villages; 1 — rural settlements

Government
  - Governor: Mykola Zahodyachenko

Area
  - Total: 1,536 km^{2} (593 sq mi)

Population (2020)
  - Total: 39,700 ▼
  - Density: 25.8/km^{2} (66.9/sq mi)
- Time zone: UTC+02:00 (EET)
  - Summer (DST): UTC+03:00 (EEST)
- Postal index: 93500—93543
- Area code: +380 6445
- Website: Official website

Novoaydarsky Municipal District Новоайдарский муниципальный округ (Russian)
- District

Other transcription(s)
  - Ukrainian: Новоайдарський район
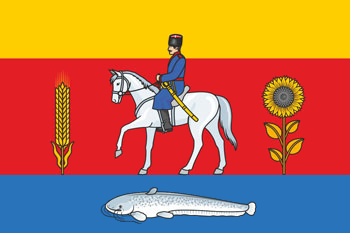
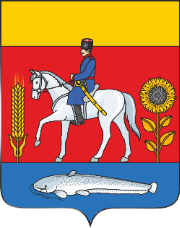
- Flag Coat of arms

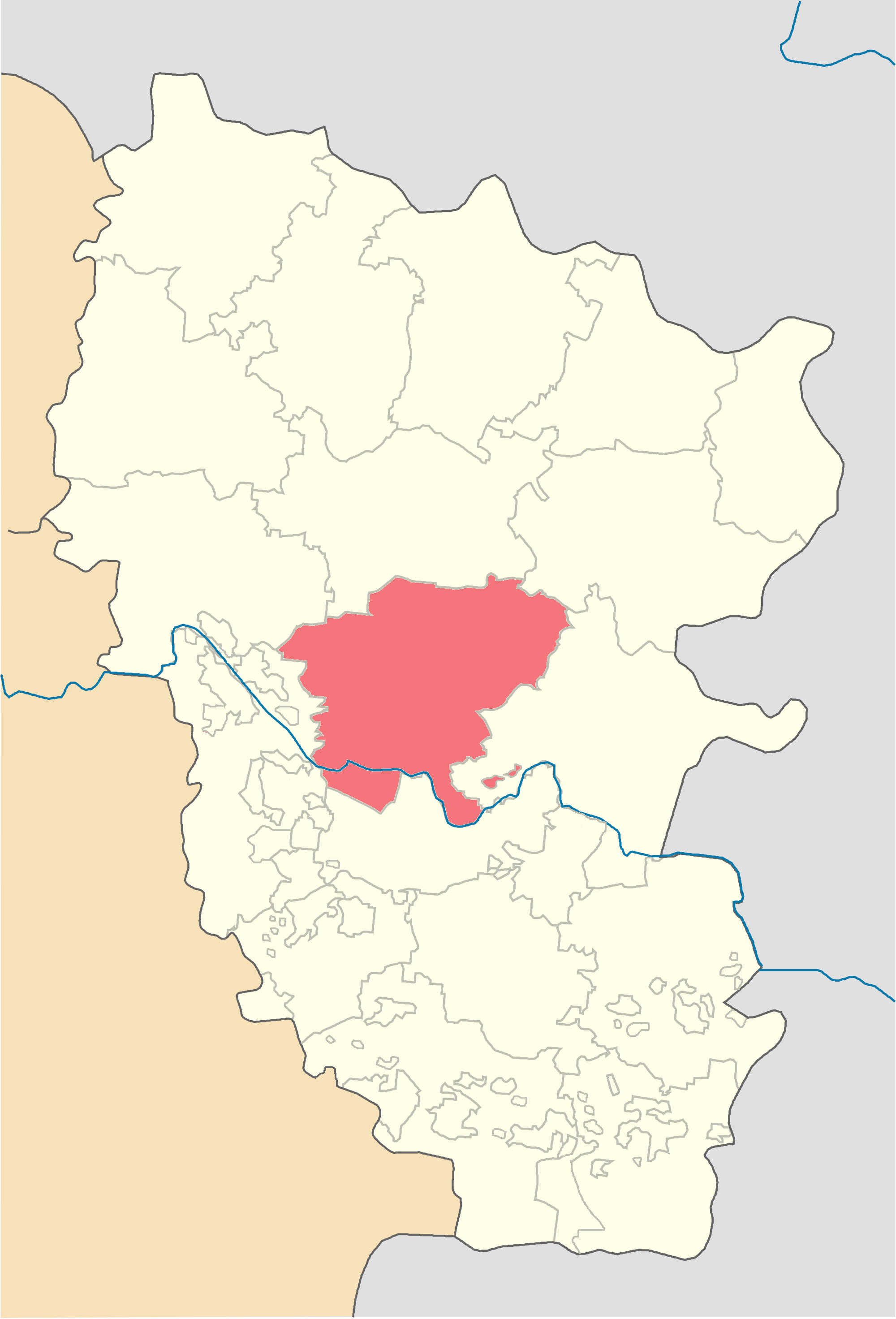
- Location of Novoaydarsky District in the Luhansk People's Republic
- Coordinates: 48°57′34″N 38°58′32″E
- Country: Russia
- Federal subject: Luhansk People's Republic
- Established: 1923
- Administrative center: Novoaydar

Area
  - Total: 1,536 km^{2} (593 sq mi)
- Website: https://novoaydar.ru

Novoaidar Raion (Ukrainian: Новоайдарський район) was a raion (district) in Luhansk Oblast in eastern Ukraine. The administrative center of the raion was the urban-type settlement of Novoaidar. The raion was abolished on 18 July 2020 as part of the administrative reform of Ukraine, which reduced the number of raions of Luhansk Oblast to eight, of which only four were controlled by the government. The last estimate of the raion population was 39,700 (2020 est.).

== History ==
Starting mid-April 2014 pro-Russian separatists captured several towns and raions in Luhansk Oblast; Ukrainian forces reportedly removed the separatists from the last village of Novoaidar Raion under separatist control, Krymsky, on 20 October 2014.

To facilitate the governance of Luhansk Oblast during the War in Donbass, the Verkhovna Rada on 7 October 2014 made some changes in the administrative divisions, so that the localities in the government-controlled areas were grouped into districts. In particular, the town of Shchastia was transferred from Luhansk Municipality to Novoaidar Raion. Some areas were transferred to the raion from Slovianoserbsk Raion.

== Demographics ==
As of the 2001 Ukrainian census:

Ethnicity

- Ukrainians: 56.1%
- Russians: 42.7%
- Belarusians: 0.4%
