= Novoaidar =

Rural locality in Luhansk Oblast, Ukraine

Novoaidar Новоайдар
- Rural settlement
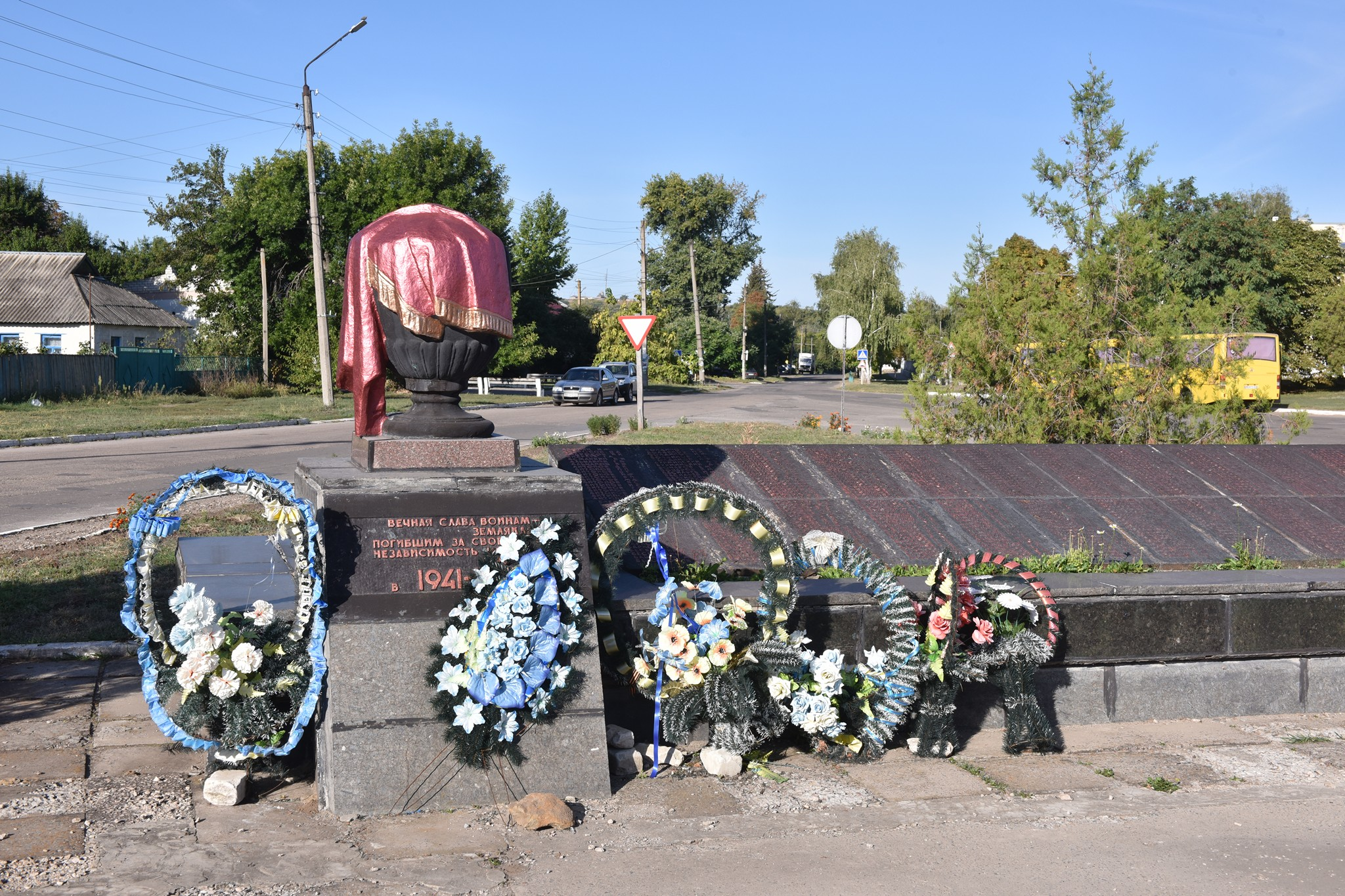
- World War II memorial

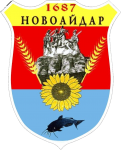
- Coat of arms

- Location in Luhansk Oblast Location in Ukraine
- Coordinates: 48°58′18″N 39°00′21″E
- Country: Ukraine
- Oblast: Luhansk Oblast
- Raion: Shchastia Raion
- Hromada: Novoaidar settlement hromada
- Established: 1685

Population (2022)
  - Total: 7,773
- Time zone: UTC+2 (EET)
  - Summer (DST): UTC+3 (EEST)
- Postal code: 93500
- Website: Official website

Novoaidar (Ukrainian and Russian: Новоайдар) is a rural settlement in Shchastia Raion, Luhansk Oblast, in the Donbas region of eastern Ukraine. Resirence of Novoaidar settlement hromada. Novoaidar is 57 km, by road from regional centre Luhansk, 43 km from Sieverodonetsk, and 747 km from Kyiv. Novoaidar is located on the river Aidar, and is on Highway H21, which runs from Donetsk to Starobilsk.

On March 3, 2022, just over a week after the 2022 Russian invasion of Ukraine began, Novoaidar was taken by Russian forces. Following the highly disputed 2022 annexation referendums in Russian-occupied Ukraine, Russia has claimed the settlement as part of their Luhansk People's Republic (LPR / LNR), and it remains under Russian control. Novoaidar has an estimated population of 7,773 (2022 estimate).

== History ==
The area around the river Aidar was initially settled by Don Cossacks in the late 16th century. There would be extensive development of the settlement throughout the 17th, and 18th century, and in 1788/89, the settlement gained its modern name of Novoaidar.

During the Ukrainian War of Independence, from 1917 to 1920, it passed between various factions. Afterwards, it was administratively part of the Donets Governorate of Ukraine. There has been a newspaper published in the area since 1931.

In 1981, the population of Novoaidar was 6500, there was a food and beverage factory, a Severodonetsk dairy shop, a Voroshilovgrad household goods factory, a poultry farm, a forestry plant, a construction company, extensive agricultural infrastructure, three secondary schools, a music school, a sports school, a hospital, a Palace of Culture, a cinema and two libraries.

In 1989, the population of Novoaidar reached its maximum to date, of 8367. Novoaidar remained part of the Ukrainian SSR until its dissolution in 1991, and was from then part of Ukraine.

=== 2014–2022 ===
From 2014, Novoaidar, as all of Donbas, became caught up in the aftermath of Euromaidan. From April 2014, pro-Russia separatists started taking over parts of the south and east of Ukraine. In April and early May 2014, Luhansk and the surrounding area, including Novoaidar, was taken over by Russian-backed forces of the self-proclaimed Luhansk People's Republic (LPR / LNR). The Ukrainian Government launched their Anti-Terrorist Operation in mid-April 2014, with the aim of taking back all territories under separatist control. In May, the 2014 Donbass status referendums were held. The referendums, which are vastly considered as sham, returned an overwhelming majority vote to cede from Ukraine into the self-proclaimed Donetsk and Lugansk People's Republics, however they were condemned by the west, and did not obtain international recognition.

Following the referendum, on May 11, Novoaidar was briefly held by the separatists, however Ukrainian forces took back control on May 14. Unlike the areas of Donbas under separatist control, the 2014 Ukrainian presidential election was held in Novoaidar. During the casting of ballots, on May 25, 2014, it was reported that about 50 armed pro-Russia rebels attacked a polling station trying to seize ballots already cast. Their attempts were reported as thwarted, with 13 of them captured, and one killed. Following the declaration of billionaire businessman Petro Poroshenko as winner of the presidential election, fighting once again flared up around Novoaidar. At this time, Novoaidar first came to attention in global media.

From June 2014 until February 2022, despite hostilities going on nearby, Novoaidar itself would not be an active zone of conflict, however it would still be affected by the ongoing war in Donbas. In the mid-2014 to early 2022 period, several civilians were reported to have been wounded by land mines, with at least one of those civilians taken to the hospital in Novoaidar.

Until July 2020, Novoaidar had served as the regional centre of the Novoaidar Raion of Ukraine. As part of the Ukrainian 2020 reform of the administrative divisions of Ukraine, the number of raions (districts) in Luhansk Oblasts was reduced to six and Shchastia Raion was created. The city of Shchastia was the official administrative center of the new raion, however as its status was only de jure due to the city was too close to territory held by the Luhansk People's Republic, Novoaidar remained the administrative center of the Shchastia Raion.

=== 2022–present ===
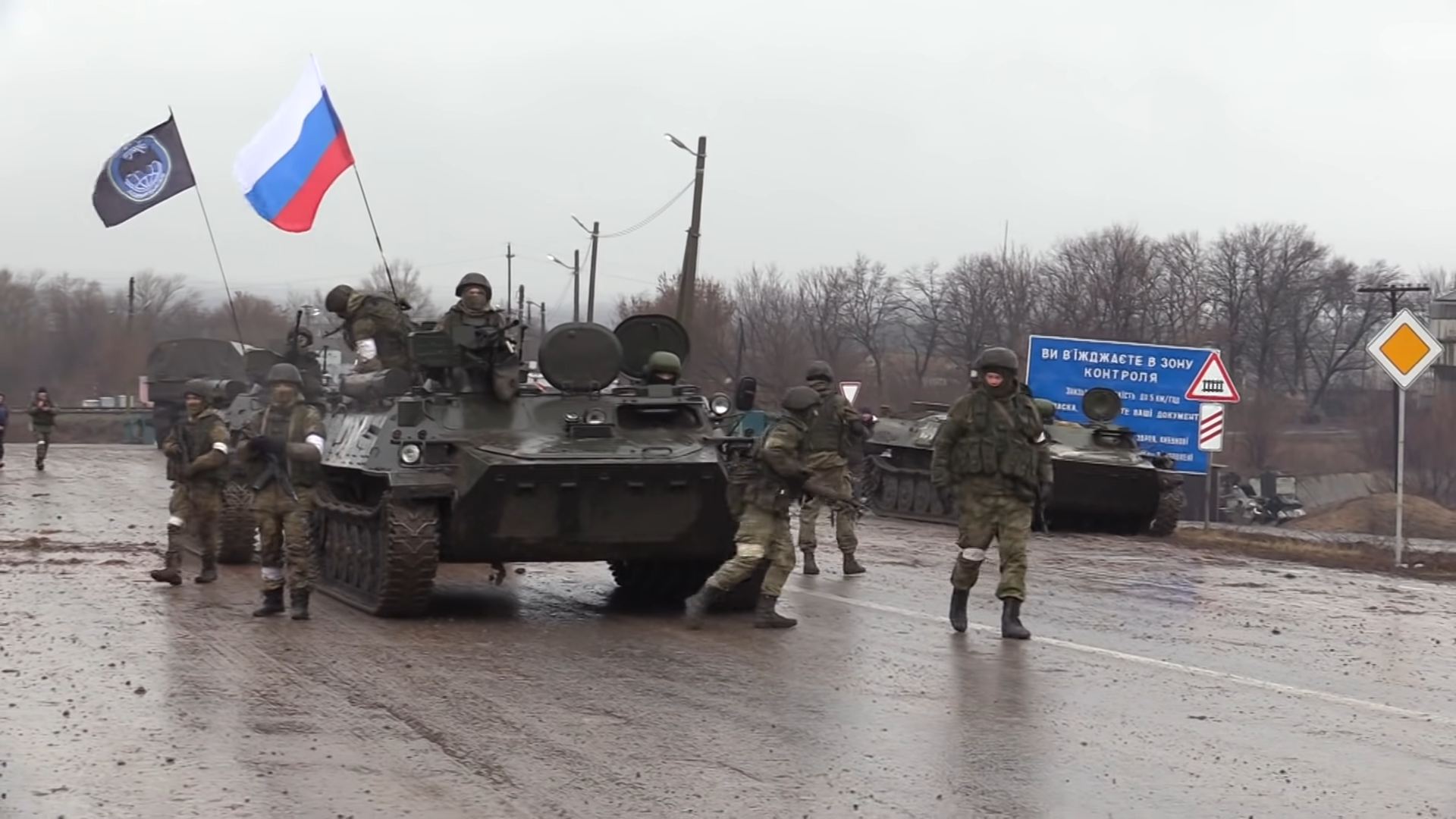
Russian troops in Novoaidar.

On 3 March 2022, just over a week after 2022 Russian invasion of Ukraine began, the LPR announced that Novoaidar had been captured by Russian forces. Novoaidar itself suffered minimal damage, and no reported civilian casualties in Russia's capture, as Russian forces swept in, taking over a base of Ukraine's 79th Brigade, with Ukrainian forces retreating to nearby Sieverodonetsk and Lysychansk, which would themselves be taken by Russia several months later.

On 25 April, partisans kidnapped and killed a pro-Russian collaborator, who reportedly gave away names and addresses of local political activists, veterans of the Ukrainian Army, and suspected guerilla fighters.

In mid-September 2022, Ukraine claimed that Russian forces had suffered heavy losses in fighting there. Russia's annexation referendum was held there in September 2022. Since then, Novoaidar has been administered by Russia as part of their LPR. In January 2023, Russia reported that Ukraine had shelled a hospital in Novoaidar, killing 14 people and wounding 24 patients and medical staff.

Although being a regional centre under Ukraine, it is unclear what, if any, status Novoaidar now holds in Russian-controlled LPR.

== Demographics ==
As of the 2001 Ukrainian census, the town had a population of 9,020 people. Like in most other major settlements in Eastern Ukraine's Donbas region, the majority of the local population is ethnically Ukrainian, yet mostly Russian-speaking. The exact linguistic composition was as follows:

First languages in Novoaidar
	percent
Russian	76.7%
Ukrainian	23.1%
Others/no answer	0.2%

== Notable people ==
- Hanna Kyrychenko (born 1991), Ukrainian volleyball player
- Yevhen Selin (born 1988), Ukrainian football player
- Ihor Shopin (born 1978), Ukrainian football player
