= Stanytsia Luhanska settlement hromada =

Stanytsia Luhanska settlement hromada Станично-Луганська селищна громада
- Hromada
- Interactive map of Stanytsia Luhanska settlement hromada
- Country: Ukraine
- Oblast: Luhansk
- Raion: Shchastia

Area
  - Total: 514.3 km^{2} (198.6 sq mi)

Population (2020)
  - Total: 23,237
  - Density: 45.18/km^{2} (117.0/sq mi)
- Settlements: 14
- Villages: 13
- Towns: 1

Stanytsia Luhanska settlement hromada (Ukrainian: Станично-Луганська селищна громада) is a hromada of Ukraine, located in Shchastia Raion, Luhansk Oblast. Its administrative center is the town of Stanytsia Luhanska.

It has an area of 514.3 square kilometres (198.6 mi^{2}) and a population of 23,237, as of 2020.

The hromada contains 14 settlements: 2 rural settlements (Stanytsia Luhanska and Vilkhove) and 12 villages:

- Bolotene
- Kolesnikivka
- Komyshne
- Makarove
- Malynove
- Nizhnya Vilkhova
- Plotyna
- Pshenichne
- Syze
- Valuyske
- Verkhnya Vilkhova
- Yuhanivka

== See also ==
- List of hromadas of Ukraine
