= Novoaidar settlement hromada =

Novoaidar settlement hromada Новоайдарська селищна громада
- Hromada
- Interactive map of Novoaidar settlement hromada
- Country: Ukraine
- Oblast: Luhansk Oblast
- Raion: Shchastia Raion

Area
  - Total: 1,312.1 km^{2} (506.6 sq mi)

Population (2020)
  - Total: 21,007
  - Density: 16.010/km^{2} (41.466/sq mi)
- Settlements: 32
- Rural settlements: 1
- Villages: 30
- Towns: 1

Novoaidar settlement hromada (Ukrainian: Новоайдарська селищна громада) is a hromada of Ukraine, located in Shchastia Raion, Luhansk Oblast. Its administrative center is the town of Novoaidar.

It has an area of 1,312.1 square kilometres (506.6 mi^{2}) and a population of 21,007, as of 2020.

The hromada contains 32 settlements: 2 rural settlements (Novoaidar and Peremoha), 30 villages:

- Aidar-Mykolaivka
- Bakhmutivka
- Bezhynove
- Vovkodayeve
- Hrechyshkine
- Demenkove
- Petropavlivske
- Dmytrivka
- Dubove
- Kapitanove
- Koliadivka
- Kovpaky
- Malovendelivka
- Mykhailivka
- Mykhailiuk
- Muratove
- Novookhtyrka
- Oknyne
- Oleksiivka

== See also ==
- List of hromadas of Ukraine
