= Peremoha, Luhansk Oblast =

Peremoha Перемога
- Village
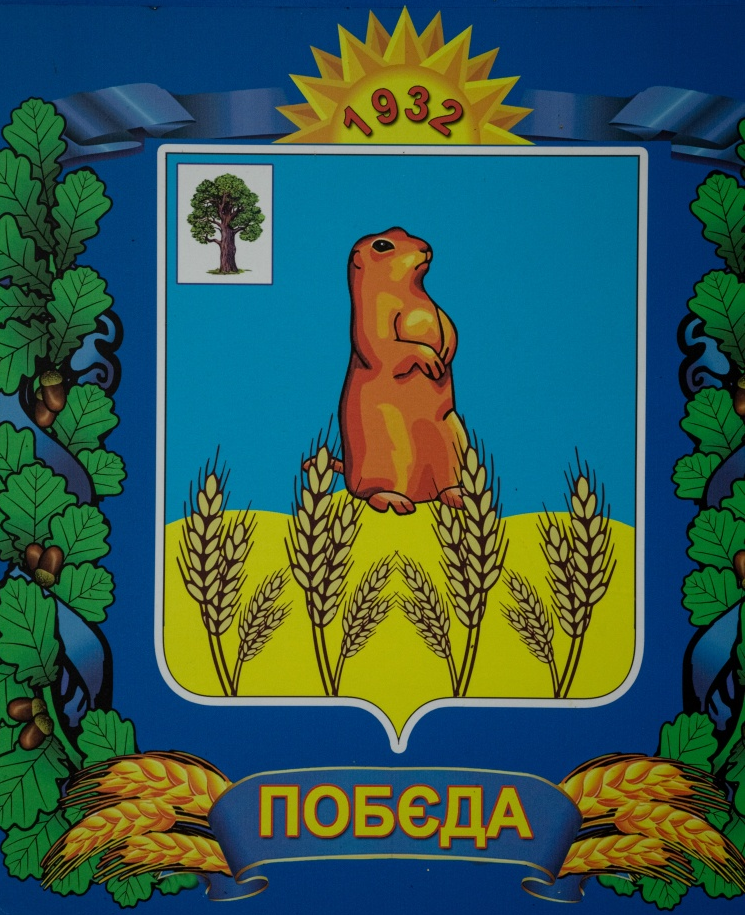
- Coat of arms

- Location in Luhansk Oblast Location in Ukraine
- Coordinates: 49°02′28″N 39°06′54″E
- Country: Ukraine
- Oblast: Luhansk Oblast
- Raion: Shchastia Raion
- Hromada: Novoaidar settlement hromada
- Control: Occupied by Luhansk People's Republic and Russia

Area
  - Total: 2 km^{2} (0.77 sq mi)

Population
  - Total: 509
  - Density: 250/km^{2} (660/sq mi)
- Postal code: 3523
- Area code: +380 6445

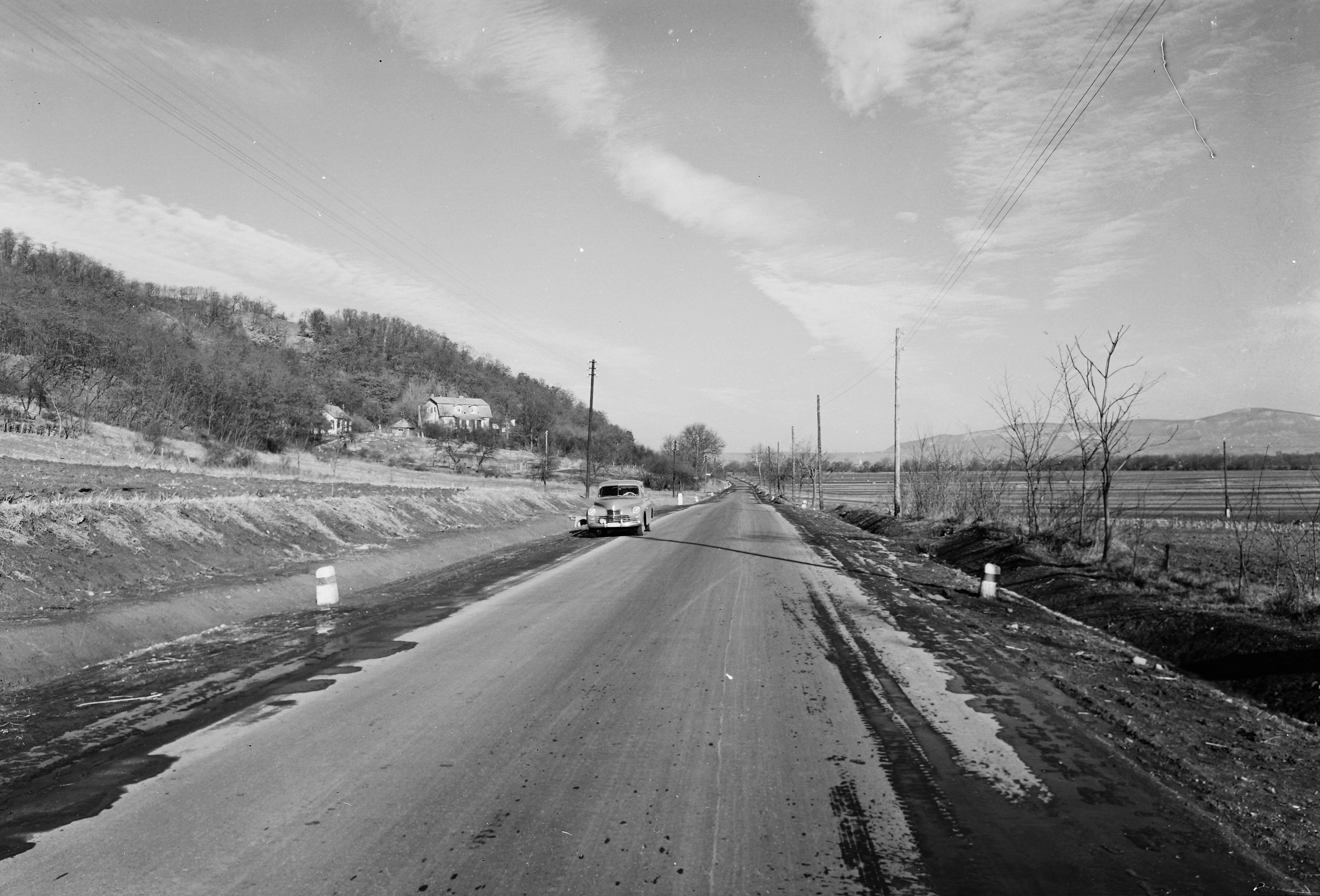
Pobieda Road

Peremoha (Ukrainian: Перемога), formerly Pobieda (Побєда), is a village of 509 people (654 in 2001) in Novoaidar settlement hromada, Shchastia Raion of Luhansk Oblast in eastern Ukraine. The village occupies the area of 2 square kilometers and is situated at 162 meters above sea level. The neighboring settlement of Chystopillia (89 inhabitants) is also subordinated to the Pobieda village council.

The village name "Peremoha" (russified "Pobieda") means "victory" and there are several more minor villages in Ukraine with this name.

== History ==
On 3 September 2014, pro-Russian insurgents shelled the village of Pobieda, using BM-30 "Smerch" multiple rocket launchers. It was reported by some Ukrainian sources that the village was completely destroyed. Due to shelling blast wave there was damage to some civil buildings (broken windows and roofs). There were not fixed any dead of civil population. An OSCE Special Monitoring Mission visited Pobieda and spoke to the mayor who said that at least ten rockets had struck the village. The OSCE mission saw several unexploded rockets as well as shell holes.

On 18 June 2025, the Verkhovna Rada renamed the village to Peremoha to match Ukrainian language standards.

== Demographics ==
According to 2001 all Ukraine census, Ukrainian language is native to 82.7% of village residents. Russian is native for 13.76% of Pobieda residents.

== Links ==
- Бойовики "Смерчем" зрівняли із землею селище Побєда і базу батальйону "Воля", — бійці (Ukrainian)
