= Stanytsia Luhanska =

Urban locality in Luhansk Oblast, Ukraine

Stanytsia Luhanska Станиця Луганська
- Rural settlement
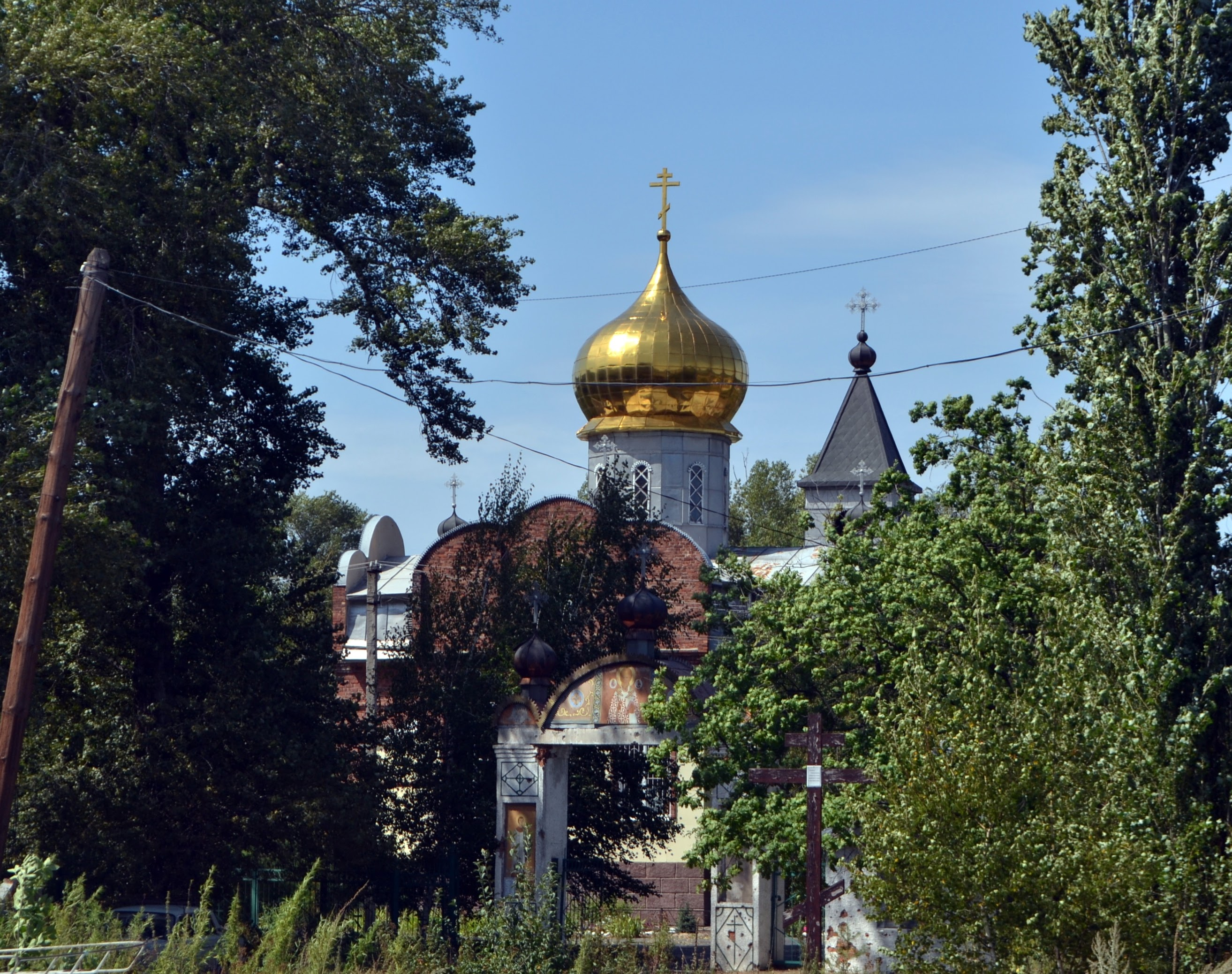

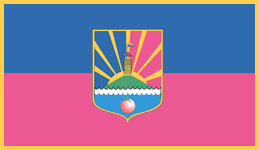
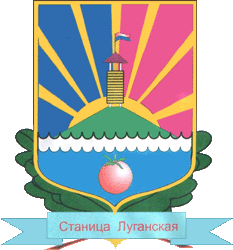
- Flag Coat of arms
- Interactive map of Stanytsia Luhanska
- Location in Luhansk Oblast Location in Ukraine
- Coordinates: 48°40′14″N 39°28′20″E
- Country: Ukraine
- Oblast: Luhansk Oblast
- District: Shchastia Raion
- Hromada: Stanytsia Luhanska settlement hromada
- Founded: 1688

Area
  - Total: 14.6 km^{2} (5.6 sq mi)
- Elevation: 40 m (130 ft)

Population (2022)
  - Total: 12,258
  - Density: 840/km^{2} (2,170/sq mi)
- Time zone: UTC+2 (EET)
  - Summer (DST): UTC+3 (EEST)
- Postal code: 93600-93609
- Area code: +380 6472

Stanytsia Luhanska (Ukrainian: Станиця Луганська, lit. 'The stanitsa of Luhansk'; Russian: Станица Луганская, romanized: Stanitsa Luganskaya) is a rural settlement on the banks of the Siverskyi Donets River in the Shchastia Raion of Luhansk Oblast in eastern Ukraine. Residence of Stanytsia Luhanska settlement hromada. Population: 12,258 (2022 estimate). It is situated 20 km northeast of Luhansk. Prior to 2020, it was the administrative centre of the former Stanytsia-Luhanska Raion.

== History ==
Stanytsia Luhanska is one of two local foundations of the Don Cossacks in today's Ukraine.

During World War II, in 1942–1943, the German occupiers operated a Nazi prison in the settlement.

=== Russo-Ukrainian war ===
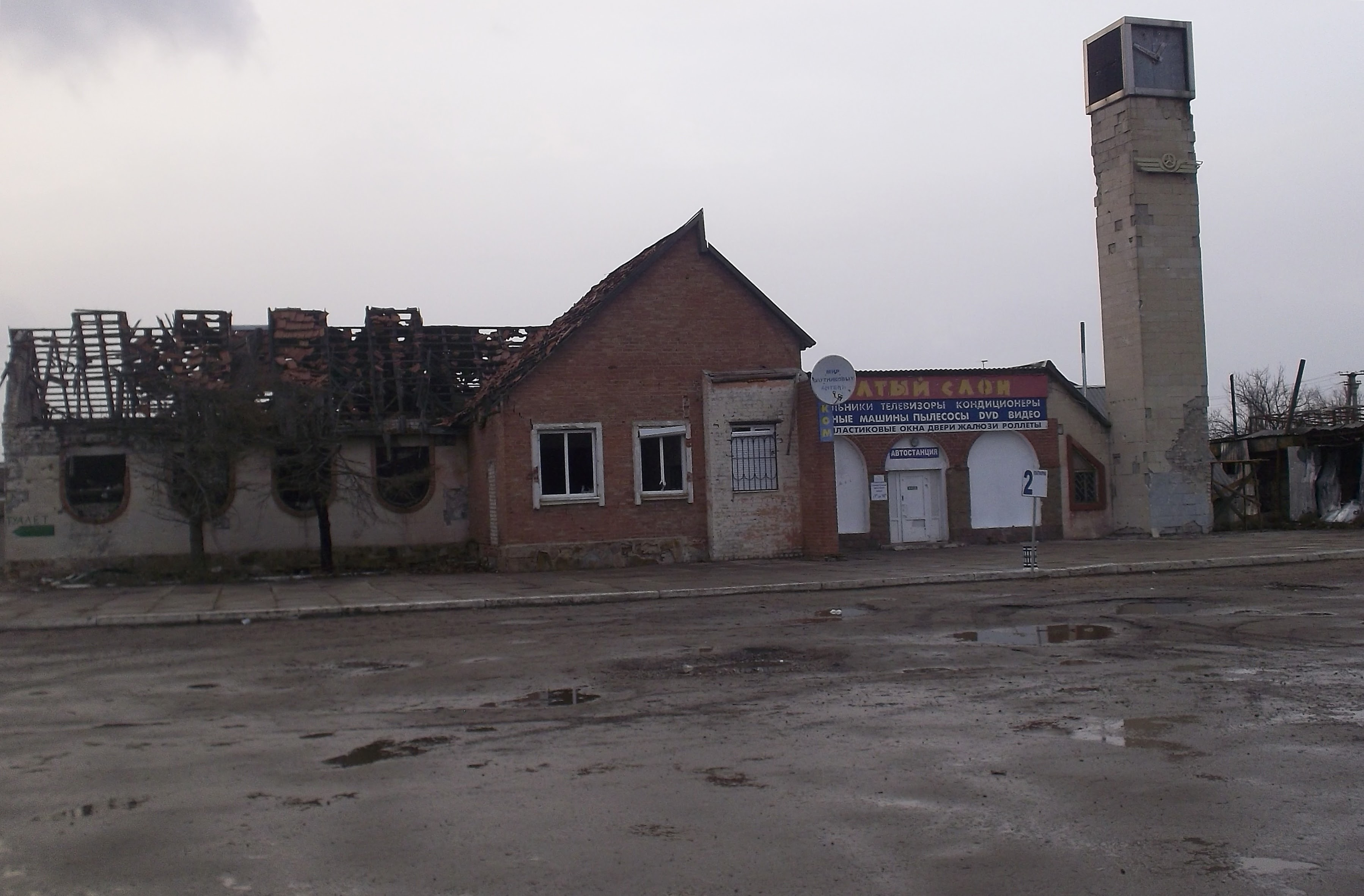
War damage in 2016

Starting Mid-April 2014 pro-Russian separatists captured several towns in the Donbass region, including Stanytsia Luhanska.

On 2 July 2014 unspecified planes attacked the village and the village of Kondrashovka. The Ukrainian army denied the airstrike and blamed the damage on faulty shelling by the separatists. There is also a version that the air strike was caused by a Russian aircraft in order to discredit the Ukrainian army by accusing it of bombing residential areas.

On 21 August 2014, Ukrainian forces reportedly were clearing Stanytsia Luhanska from the pro-Russian separatists. The settlement remained under control of the Ukrainian authorities. It became situated on the frontline with forces representing the Luhansk People's Republic and became regularly the victim of shelling. An early 2017 agreement between the Ukrainian army and the separatist forces of the war in Donbass on the disengagement of forces in Stanytsia Luhanska failed to materialise. On 17 February 2022, the rebels shelled the town and a missile hit a school, injuring 3 people. They also left half of the town without electricity. On 26 February, the settlement was occupied by Russian Ground Forces as part of the 2022 Russian invasion of Ukraine. The village council and civilian-military administration head, Albert Zinchenko, was reported as to be collaborating with the occupiers.

== Demographics ==
Native language as of the Ukrainian Census of 2001:

- Russian 92.4%
- Ukrainian 6.2%
- Romani 0.2%
- Armenian 0.2%
- Belarusian 0.1%

== Notable people ==
- Oleksandr Pielieshenko (1994-2024), Ukrainian weightlifter
