= Dəlləkli, Masally =

Dəlləkli
- Municipality
- Location within Azerbaijan
- Coordinates: 39°05′N 48°46′E
- Country: Azerbaijan
- Rayon: Masally

Population
  - Total: 173
- Time zone: UTC+4 (AZT)
  - Summer (DST): UTC+5 (AZT)

Dəlləkli (also, Dellyakli and Dallakly) is a village and municipality in the Masally Rayon of Azerbaijan. It has a population of 173.
