= Dəlləkli, Yardymli =

Dəlləkli is a village and municipality in the Yardymli Rayon of Azerbaijan. It has a population of 556.
