= Petropavlivka Raion =

Former subdivision of Dnipropetrovsk Oblast, Ukraine

Petropavlivka Raion Петропавлівський район
- Raion
- Flag Coat of arms

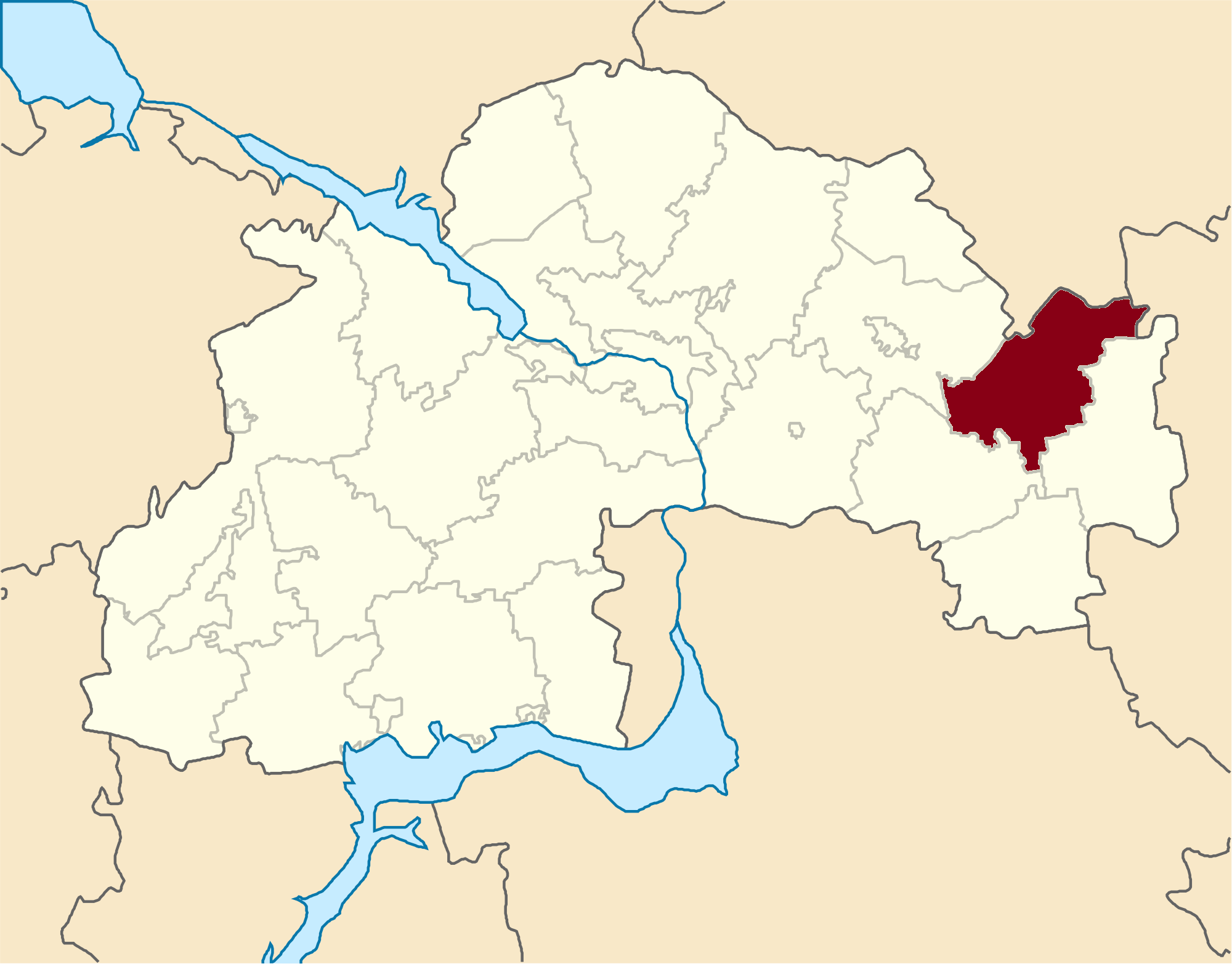
- Coordinates: 48°27′13″N 36°25′57.2″E
- Country: Ukraine
- Region: Dnipropetrovsk Oblast
- Disestablished: 18 July 2020
- Admin. center: Petropavlivka
- Subdivisions: List: — city councils; — settlement councils; — rural councils; Number of localities: — cities; — urban-type settlements; — villages; — rural settlements

Area
  - Total: 1,248 km^{2} (482 sq mi)

Population (2020)
  - Total: 25,119
  - Density: 20.13/km^{2} (52.13/sq mi)
- Time zone: UTC+02:00 (EET)
  - Summer (DST): UTC+03:00 (EEST)
- Area code: +380

Petropavlivka Raion (Ukrainian: Петропавлівський район) was a raion (district) of Dnipropetrovsk Oblast, southeastern-central Ukraine. Its administrative centre was located at the urban-type settlement of Petropavlivka. The raion was abolished on 18 July 2020 as part of the administrative reform of Ukraine, which reduced the number of raions of Dnipropetrovsk Oblast to seven. The area of Petropavlivka Raion was merged into Synelnykove Raion. The last estimate of the raion population was 25,119 (2020 est.).

At the time of disestablishment, the raion consisted of four hromadas:

- Bohynivka rural hromada with the administration in the selo of Bohynivka;
- Mykolaivka rural hromada with the administration in the selo of Mykolaivka;
- Petropavlivka settlement hromada with the administration in Petropavlivka;
- Ukrainske rural hromada with the administration in the settlement of Ukrainske.
