= Petropavlivka, Beryslav Raion, Kherson Oblast =

Rural locality in Kherson Oblast, Ukraine

Petropavlivka Петропавлівка
- Village
- Interactive map of Petropavlivka
- Location of Petropavlivka within Ukraine Petropavlivka (Ukraine)
- Coordinates: 47.2925°N 33.569444°E
- Country: Ukraine
- Oblast: Kherson Oblast
- District: Beryslav Raion
- Founded: 1821

Area
  - Total: 238.4 km^{2} (92.0 sq mi)
- Elevation: 76 m (249 ft)

Population (2001 census)
  - Total: 722
  - Density: 3.03/km^{2} (7.84/sq mi)
- Time zone: UTC+2 (EET)
  - Summer (DST): UTC+3 (EEST)
- Postal code: 74223
- Area code: +380 5533

Petropavlivka (Ukrainian: Петропавлівка; Russian: Петропавловка) is a village in Beryslav Raion, Kherson Oblast, southern Ukraine, about 50 kilometres (31 mi) northeast of the centre of Kherson city. It belongs to the Novooleksandrivka rural hromada, one of the hromadas of Ukraine.

== History ==
The village was founded sometime in the middle of the nineteenth century. In 1924, a committee of poor peasants was organized in the village. During the Great Patriotic War, the village was occupied by German troops from 23 August 1941 to 29 February 1944. Later, a central estate called the Shchors State Farm, which owned 6.5 thousand hectares of agricultural land, was formed. It specialized in the production of meat, dairy products, and grain crops. During the Eighth five-year plan, multiple workers of the state farm were awarded orders for dedicated labour.

During the 2022 Kherson counteroffensive after the Russian invasion of Ukraine, the village was liberated by Ukrainian forces from Russian occupation on 5 October 2022. The forces were under the Operational Command South.

== Administrative status ==
Until 18 July 2020, Petropavlivka belonged to Novovorontsovka Raion. The raion was abolished in July 2020 as part of the administrative reform of Ukraine, which reduced the number of raions of Kherson Oblast to five. The area of Novovorontsovka Raion was merged into Beryslav Raion.

== Demographics ==
The native language distribution as of the Ukrainian Census of 2001 was:

- Ukrainian: 96.68%
- Russian: 1.94%
- Armenian: 1.11%
- Moldovan (Romanian): 0.14%

== Monuments ==
There is an Alley of Glory dedicated to the fallen soldiers who liberated the village, which was opened in 2025.
