= Petropavlivka, Dnipropetrovsk Oblast =

Rural locality in Dnipropetrovsk Oblast, Ukraine

Petropavlivka Петропавлiвка
- Rural settlement
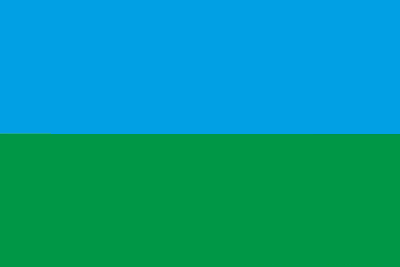
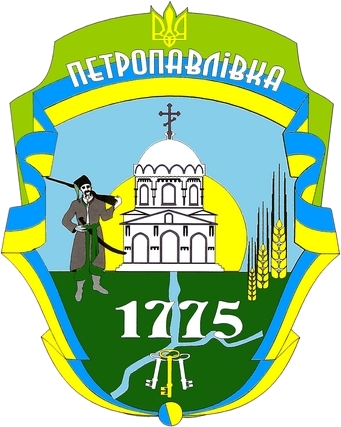
- Flag Seal
- Interactive map of Petropavlivka
- Location within Dnipropetrovsk Oblast Location within Ukraine
- Coordinates: 48°27′15″N 36°26′25″E
- Country: Ukraine
- Oblast: Dnipropetrovsk Oblast
- Raion: Synelnykove Raion

Population (2022)
  - Total: 6,651
- Time zone: UTC+2 (EET)
  - Summer (DST): UTC+3 (EEST)

Petropavlivka (Ukrainian: Петропавлiвка; Russian: Петропавловка) is a rural settlement in Synelnykove Raion, Dnipropetrovsk Oblast, Ukraine. It hosts the administration of Petropavlivka settlement hromada, one of the hromadas of Ukraine. Population: 6,651 (2022 estimate).

Petropavlivka is located on the left bank of the Samara River, a left tributary of the Dnieper.

== History ==
Until 18 July 2020, Petropavlivka was the administrative center of Petropavlivka Raion. The raion was abolished in July 2020 as part of the administrative reform of Ukraine, which reduced the number of raions of Dnipropetrovsk Oblast to seven. The area of Petropavlivka Raion was merged into Synelnykove Raion.

Until 26 January 2024, Petropavlivka was designated urban-type settlement. On this day, a new law entered into force which abolished this status, and Petropavlivka became a rural settlement.

== Economy ==
=== Transportation ===
Petropavlivka is just north of the Highway M04, connecting Pokrovsk with Dnipro and Kryvyi Rih. A road to Kramatorsk branches off north.

Petropavlivka railway station is located southeast of the settlement, in the village of Zaliznychne, on the railway connecting Pokrovsk and Pavlohrad.

== Notable people ==
- Elena Rozmirovich (1886–1953)
