= Dəlləkli, Quba =

Dəlləkli
- Location within Azerbaijan
- Coordinates: 41°24′N 48°36′E
- Country: Azerbaijan
- Rayon: Quba

Population
  - Total: 826
- Time zone: UTC+4 (AZT)
  - Summer (DST): UTC+5 (AZT)

Dəlləkli (known as Petropavlovka until 1992) is a village and municipality in the Quba Rayon of Azerbaijan. It has a population of 826.
