= Stanytsia-Luhanska Raion =

Former subdivision of Luhansk Oblast, Ukraine

Stanytsia-Luhanska Raion Станично-Луганський район
- Raion
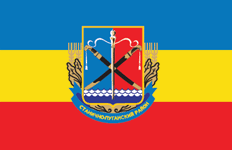
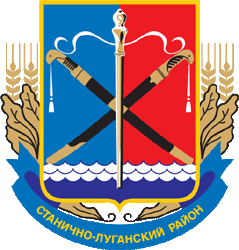
- Flag Coat of arms

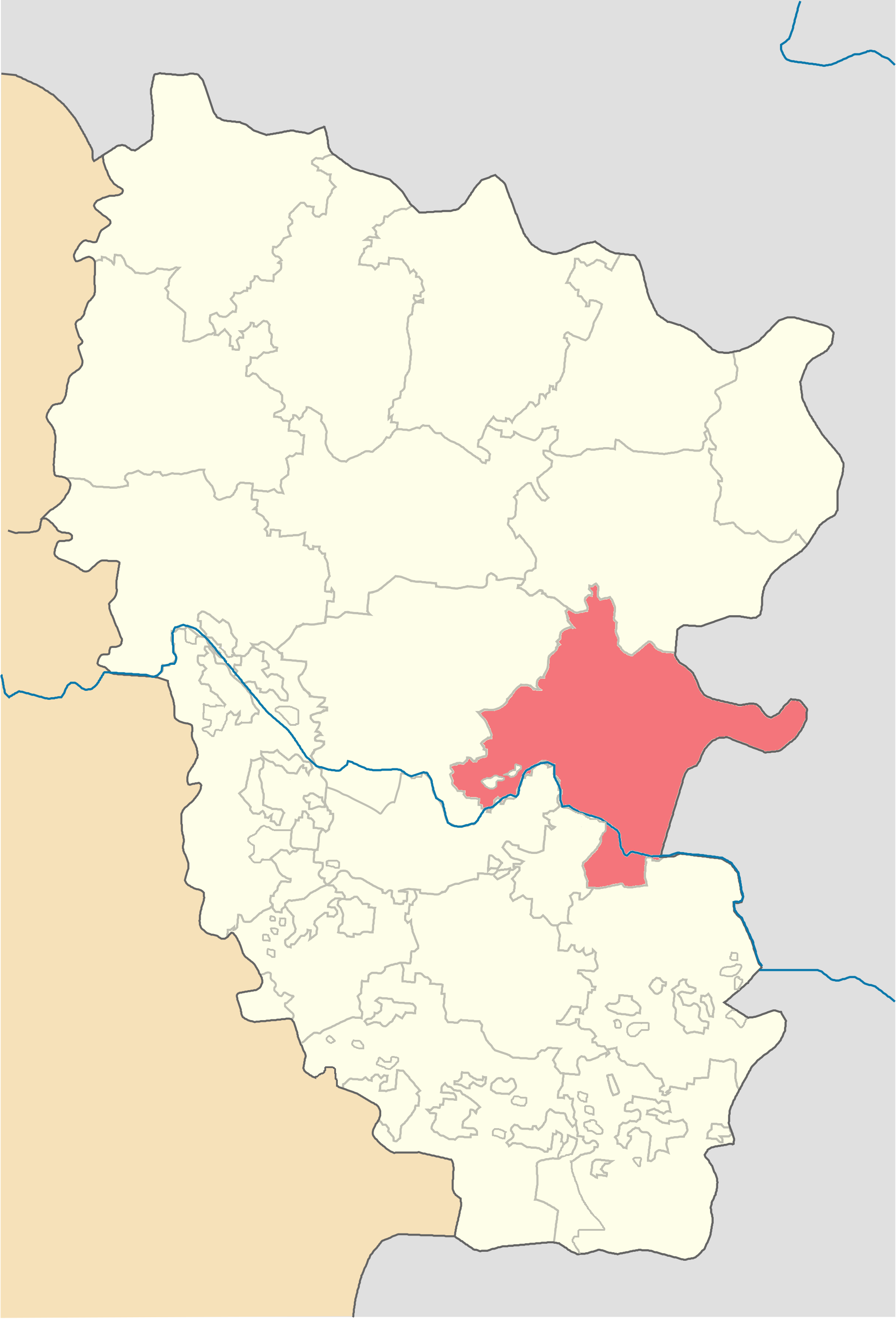
- Coordinates: 48°49′3″N 39°31′38″E
- Country: Ukraine
- Region: Luhansk Oblast
- Established: 1923
- Disestablished: 18 July 2020
- Admin. center: Stanytsia Luhanska
- Subdivisions: List: 0 — city councils; 2 — settlement councils; 16 — rural councils; Number of localities: 0 — cities; 2 — urban-type settlements; 41 — villages; 6 — rural settlements

Government
  - Governor: Yuriy Gladkyh

Area
  - Total: 1,900 km^{2} (730 sq mi)

Population (2020)
  - Total: 46,672 ▼
  - Density: 25/km^{2} (64/sq mi)
- Time zone: UTC+02:00 (EET)
  - Summer (DST): UTC+03:00 (EEST)
- Postal index: 93600—93655
- Area code: +380 6472
- Website: http://stn.loga.gov.ua

Stanichno-Lugansky Municipal District Станично-Луганский муниципальный округ (Russian)
- District

Other transcription(s)
  - Ukrainian: Станично-Луганський район
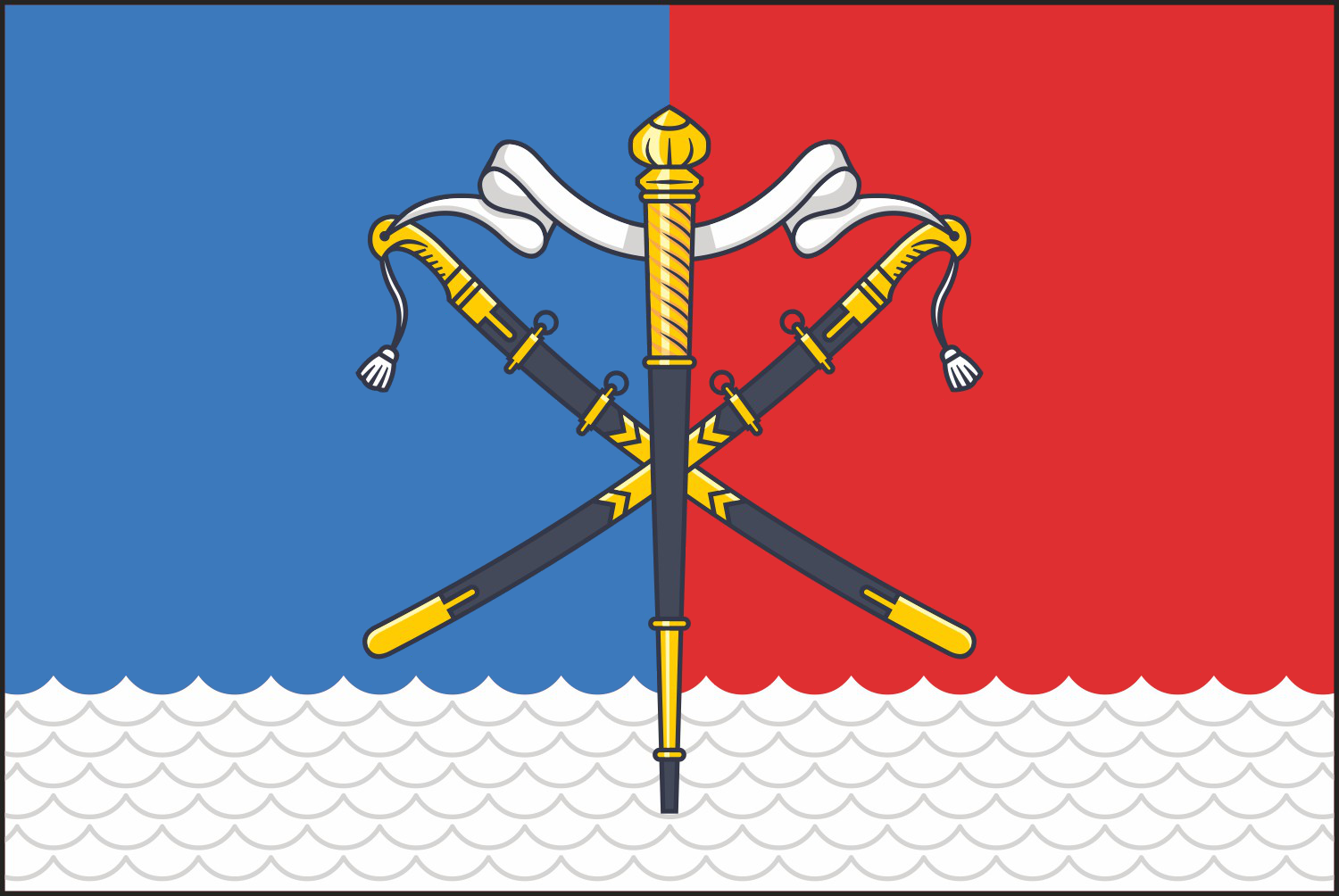
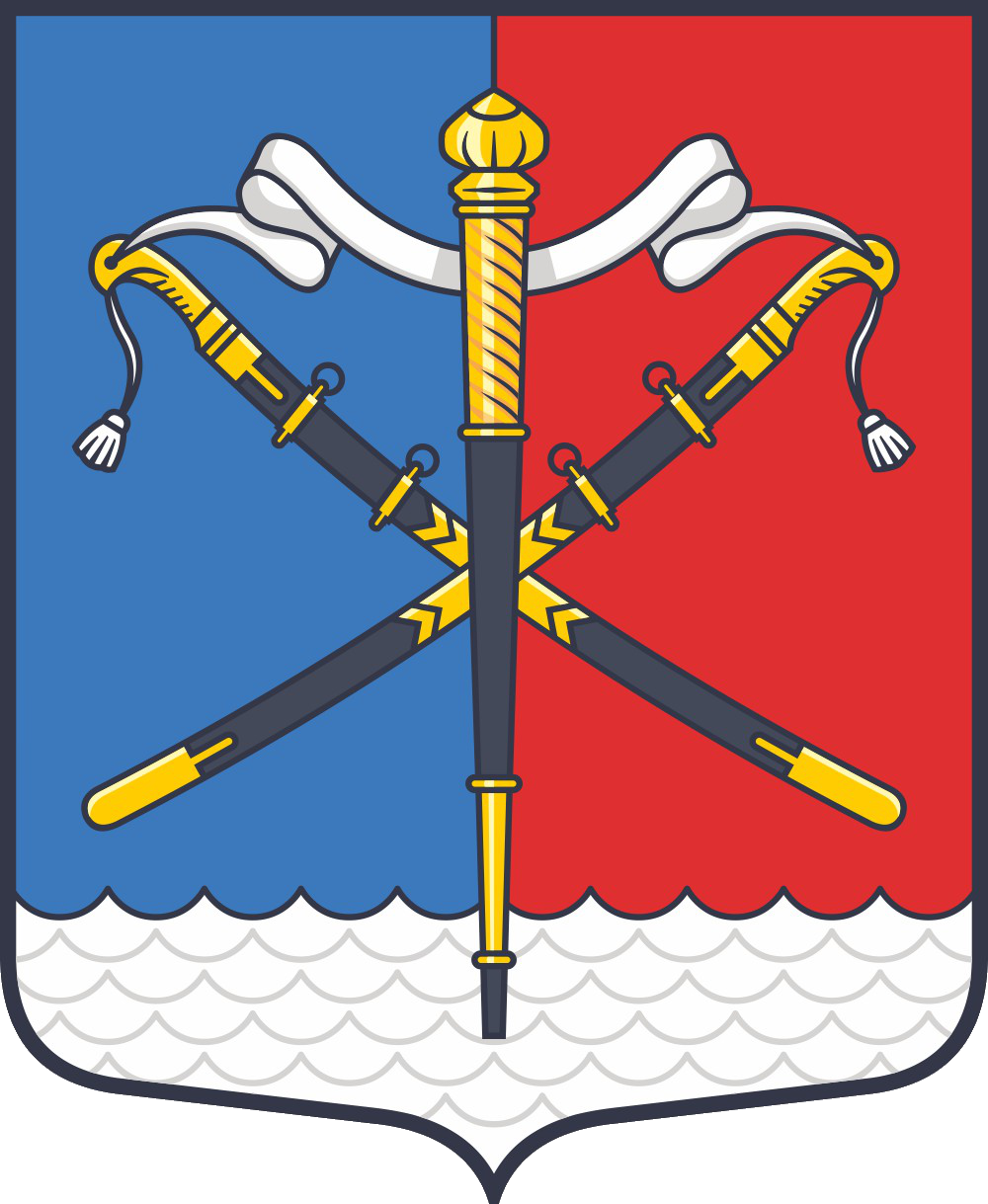
- Flag Coat of arms

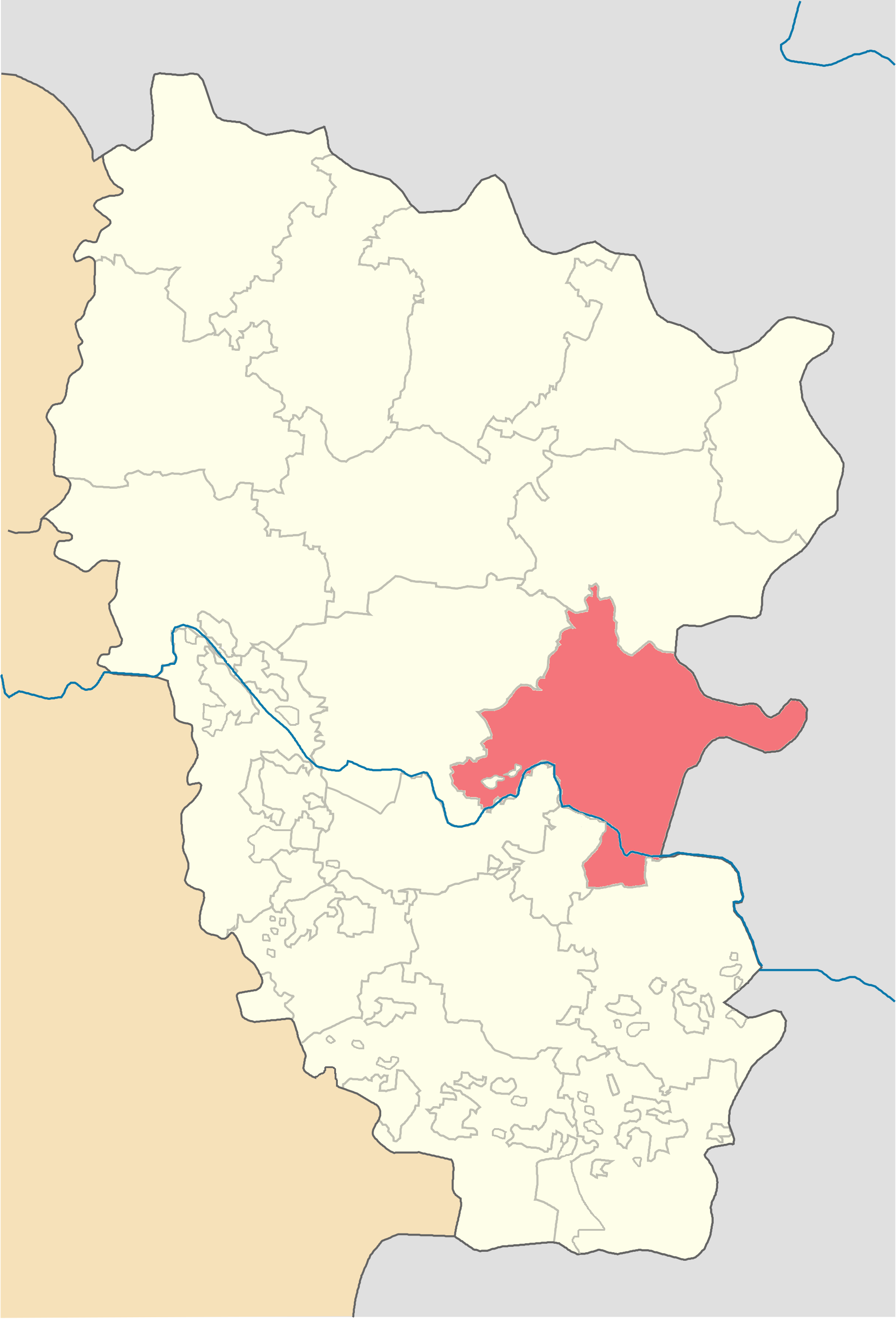
- Location of Stanichno-Lugansk District in the Luhansk People's Republic
- Coordinates: 48°49′3″N 39°31′38″E
- Country: Russia
- Federal subject: Luhansk People's Republic
- Established: 1926
- Administrative center: Stanitsa Luganskaya

Area
  - Total: 1,900 km^{2} (730 sq mi)
- Website: https://stanicalug-lnr.ru

Stanytsia-Luhanska Raion (Ukrainian: Станично-Луганський район; Russian: Станично-Луганский район) was a raion (district) in Luhansk Oblast of eastern Ukraine. The administrative center of the raion was the urban-type settlement of Stanytsia Luhanska. The raion was abolished on 18 July 2020 as part of the administrative reform of Ukraine, which reduced the number of raions of Luhansk Oblast to eight, of which only four were controlled by the government. The last estimate of the raion population was 46,672 (2020 est.).

Since 2014, some areas of the raion have been controlled by the Luhansk People's Republic, a Russia-backed militant group. They were later absorbed into other administrative units.. The region was fully occupied by Russia in 2022, and the raion was re-established and fully-funtioning under the new Russian-controlled government.

== Demographics ==
As of the 2001 Ukrainian Census:

Ethnicity

- Russians: 61.1%
- Ukrainians: 36.5%
- Belarusians: 0.6%

Language

- Russian: 85.1%
- Ukrainian: 14.2%
- Armenian: 0.2%
- Belarusian: 0.1%
- Romani: 0.1%
