= Shchastia Raion =

Subdivision of Luhansk Oblast, Ukraine

Coordinates: 48°58′N 39°25′E

Shchastia Raion Щастинський район
- Raion
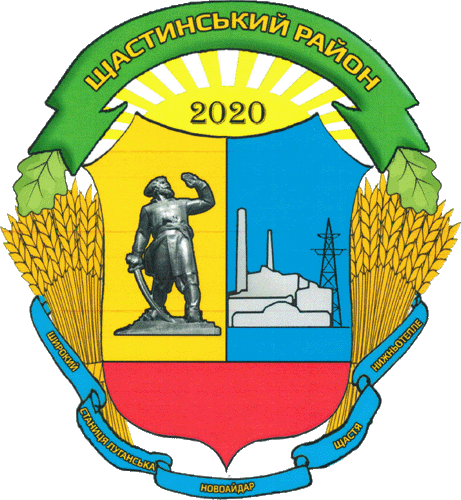
- Flag Seal
- Interactive map of Shchastia Raion
- Country: Ukraine
- Oblast: Luhansk Oblast
- Established: 2020
- Admin. center: Shchastia (de jure); Novoaidar (de facto)
- Subdivisions: 5 hromadas

Area
  - Total: 3,380 km^{2} (1,310 sq mi)

Population (2022)
  - Total: 77,615
  - Density: 23.0/km^{2} (59.5/sq mi)

Shchastia Raion (Ukrainian: Щастинський район, romanized: Shchastynskyi raion; Russian: Счастьинский район) is a raion (district) of Luhansk Oblast, Ukraine. It was created in July 2020 as part of the reform of administrative divisions of Ukraine. The de jure administrative center of the raion is the city of Shchastia, although, until 2022, the de facto administrative center was located in the urban-type settlement of Novoaidar because the city of Shchastia was situated too close to territory controlled by Russia via its Luhansk People's Republic proxy militias. Population: 77,615 (2022 estimate). Following the full-scale Russian invasion of Ukraine in 2022, the entire region fell under Russian control.

== Subdivisions ==
The raion contains five hromadas:

- Novoaidar settlement hromada
- Nyzhnioteple rural hromada
- Shchastia urban hromada
- Shyrokyi rural hromada
- Stanytsia Luhanska settlement hromada
