= Battle of Sievierodonetsk (2022) =

Battle in the Russo-Ukrainian war

- Part of the battle of Donbas during the eastern Ukraine campaign
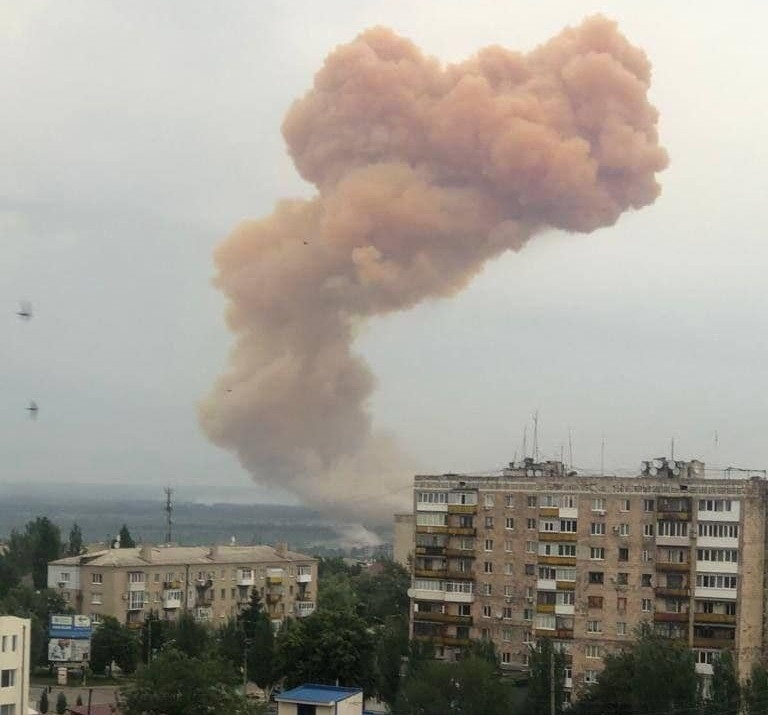
- Smoke from the Azot chemical plant after being attacked by Russian forces in the city
Date	6 May – 25 June 2022 (1 month, 2 weeks and 5 days)
Location	Sievierodonetsk, Luhansk Oblast, Ukraine
Result	Russian victory
Territorial changes	Russian forces capture the city of Sievierodonetsk and the settlements of Syrotyne, Voronove and Borivske.

Belligerents
Russia; Luhansk PR	Ukraine

Units involved
Russian Armed Forces; Russian Ground Forces; 4th Guards Tank Division; 423rd Motor Rifle Regiment; 13th Tank Regiment; Central Grouping of Forces; (Luhansk People's Republic) LPR People's Militia (2nd Army Corps); National Guard of Russia; (Chechnya) Kadyrovites; PMC Wagner	Armed Forces of Ukraine; Ukrainian Ground Forces; International Legion; Sheikh Mansur Battalion; Kastuś Kalinoŭski Regiment; National Guard of Ukraine; 4th Rapid Reaction Brigade; Irregular civilian volunteers

Strength
12,500 (in Luhansk, per Ukraine)	Unknown

Casualties and losses
ISW claim: Heavy; Ukrainian claim: 10,000–11,000 killed (2,000 LPR servicemen), 20,000+ wounded	ISW claim: Heavy; Ukrainian claim: 161+ killed, wounded or captured Russian claim: 1,220 killed (15–24 June only); 1,000 casualties, including 800 prisoners (Zolote cauldron)
- Ukrainian claim (13 April – 26 May): 1,100 civilians killed

The Battle of Sievierodonetsk was a military engagement in the wider battle of Donbas of the eastern Ukraine campaign during the Russian invasion of Ukraine.

The city of Sievierodonetsk acted as the administrative centre of unoccupied Luhansk Oblast prior to the invasion. By May 2022, Sievierodonetsk and the neighbouring city of Lysychansk were the only notable parts of the oblast that remained under Ukrainian control.

By 14 June 2022, Russian forces had gained control of most of the city and cut off most escape routes. On 24 June 2022, Ukrainian units were ordered to retreat from the city and the next day Russian and pro-Russian separatist forces fully captured Sievierodonetsk. The Russian advance continued against Lysychansk, which fell in early July.

The Battle of Sievierodonetsk was marked by fierce urban combat and has been described as one of the war's bloodiest. Around 90% of the city's buildings were destroyed or damaged.

== Background ==
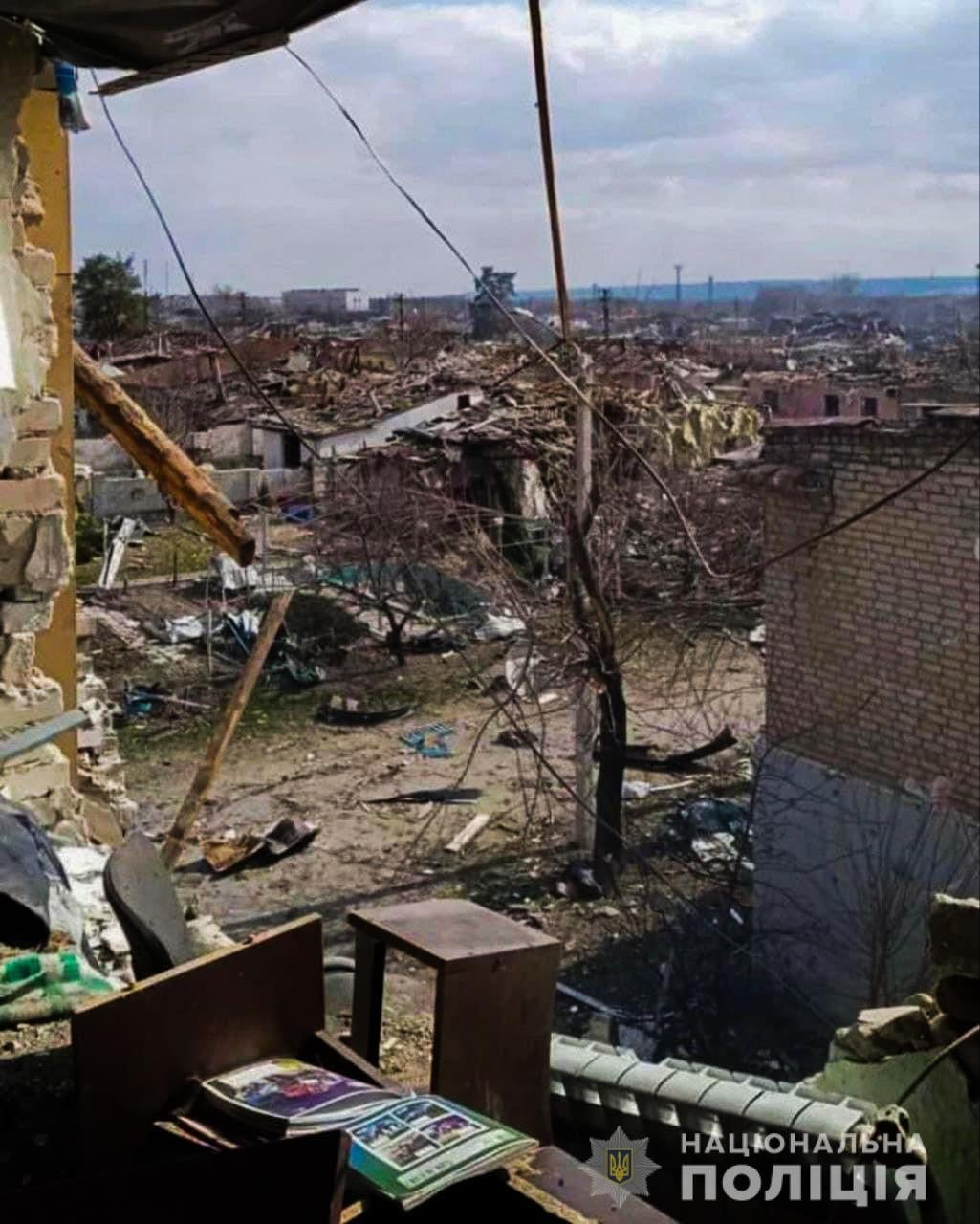
Aftermath of Russian shelling in Sievierodonetsk on 6 April 2022

The twin cities of Sievierodonetsk and Lysychansk were the site of a series of battles in 2014 between pro-Russian separatists and the Ukrainian military during the war in Donbas. Soon after the start of the Russian invasion of Ukraine, on 28 February 2022, Russian forces began to shell Sievierodonetsk. According to Serhiy Haidai, Ukraine's governor of Luhansk Oblast, one person was killed and several were injured. Gas pipelines were also struck by the shelling. On 2 March, fighting was reported in almost all the villages near Sievierodonetsk. Russian forces continued to shell the city, including a school gym that was acting as a bomb shelter. No deaths were reported. At 15:20 that day, Ukrainian officials said Russian forces tried to break through Ukrainian lines towards the city, but were repelled.

A month into its invasion, Russia claimed to control 93% of Luhansk Oblast, leaving Sievierodonetsk and Lysychansk as strategically important Ukrainian holdouts in the area. Russian plans to capture Sievierodonetsk hinged upon successes in the nearby cities of Rubizhne to the north and Popasna to the south. By 6 April, Russian forces had reportedly captured 60% of Rubizhne, and shells and rockets were landing in Sievierodonetsk on "regular, sustained intervals". The next day, forces of the 128th Mountain Assault Brigade conducted an offensive which reportedly drove Russian forces 6–10 kilometers away from the nearby town of Kreminna.

By 9 April, elements of the Russian 4th Guards Tank Division were reportedly concentrating near Sievierodonetsk. Between 11 and 12 April, continued Russian attacks in the area gained no ground. By 16 April, Ukraine claimed that 70% of Sievierodonetsk was destroyed by Russian shelling. On 18 April, Russia renewed its offensive in eastern Ukraine, launching airstrikes on Sievierodonetsk. By the end of April, most of Sievierodonetsk's civilian population had fled.

In late April, Russian forces launched an all-out offensive along an 800-kilometre (500 mi) front to fully capture the remaining unoccupied territory of Donetsk and Luhansk Oblasts.

== Battle ==
=== Encirclement attempts ===
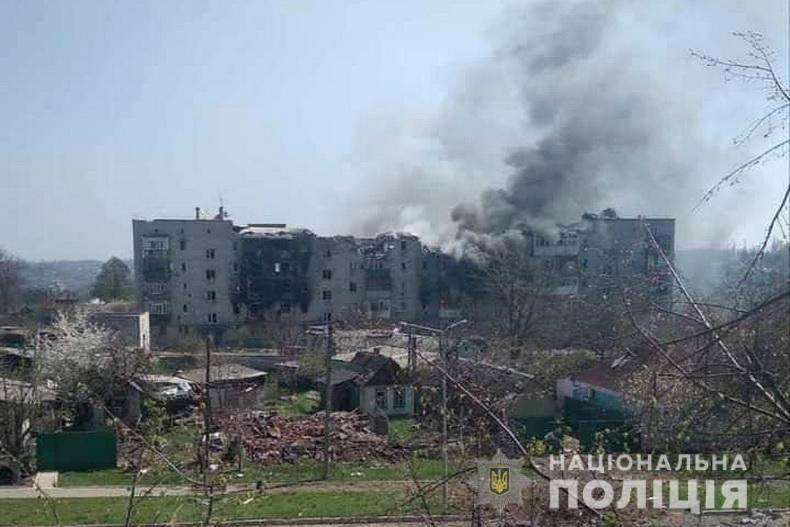
Buildings in Sievierodonetsk destroyed by artillery fire

On 6 May, Russian and separatist Luhansk People's Republic (LPR) forces made gains in the outskirts of Sievierodonetsk, attacking the village of Voevodivka just north of the city, while also capturing the village of Voronove to the southeast. Other villages were also attacked in an attempt to surround the city. Subsequently, it was reported by the city's mayor, Oleksandr Stryuk, that Sievierodonetsk was "virtually surrounded". Over the next days, Russian and separatist forces attacked Bilohorivka, Voevodivka, and Lysychansk, intending to cut off Sievierodonetsk from the south. They also captured Popasna.

On 9 May, LPR troops reportedly took control of Nyzhnie and began attacking Toshkivka, two settlements southeast of Sievierodonetsk. Heavy combat continued in Rubizhne, Voevodivka, and Bilohorivka, as Russian forces attempted to further encircle Sievierodonetsk from the western axis. The next day, Ukrainian forces destroyed a Russian pontoon bridge across the Donets river in the vicinity of Bilohorivka, attempting to disrupt the Russian advance, and reportedly destroying almost an entire Russian battalion in the process. According to Ukrainian regional police chief Oleh Hryhorov, Sievierodonetsk and its direct neighbour, Lysychansk, had become tactically encircled, as Russian artillery could freely strike the remaining open roads into the city. Power and water supply was disrupted in the cities, leaving tens of thousands of civilians without basic necessities. By 12 May, Russian and LPR forces had defeated Ukrainian forces in the battle of Rubizhne and established full control of the city, furthering their attempts at encircling Sievierodonetsk.

For the most part, Russia subsequently ceased its ground attacks on the surroundings of Sievierodonetsk and Lysychansk and limited itself to artillery bombardments. Pro-Russian forces instead focused on completing the encirclement of the two cities. To this end, they attacked at the northern frontline around Izium and in the south toward Bakhmut. The northern attacks made little to no progress, but in the south, Russia made limited advances over several days of heavy combat. Fighting was mainly concentrated on a number of villages, including Toshkivka, Pylypchatyne, Hirske, and Zolote.

=== Attack on the city ===
On 27 May, Russia began its direct ground assault against Sievierodonetsk, despite not yet having completely encircled the city. Chechen Kadyrovites captured the Mir Hotel in the northern part of the city. Meanwhile, other Russian and separatist forces continued their attempts to form a pocket in the urban areas, attacking from the north near Rubizhne and southwest at Ustynivka and Borivske. Further to the west, Russia continued to slowly advance in a number of areas such as Lyman and Siversk to disrupt the Ukrainian supply lines to Sievierodonetsk-Lysychansk. On the following day, 28 May, Russia made limited gains in Sievierodonetsk. The Institute for the Study of War (ISW), a US-based think tank and war observer, argued that the battle was already proving very costly for the Russian forces by this point, and could potentially exhaust their offensive capabilities. The ISW observed that both Russia and Ukraine were suffering heavy losses, but insisted that personnel of the pro-Russian contingents were more difficult to replace.

By 29 May, Russian forces had launched a full assault on the city. Ukrainian defenders repelled attacks but were unable to prevent Russia's encirclement efforts. Russian troops were engaged in close-quarters fighting with Ukrainian soldiers, with clashes reportedly taking place in the "middle of the city".

By the morning of 31 May, Russian forces controlled between a third and a half of the city, with the Russians pushing and dividing the city into two halves. Later in the day, Ukraine confirmed between 70 and 80 per cent of Sievierodonetsk was under Russian control, as well as most of the surrounding villages. Luhansk governor Serhiy Haidai reported on the street battles and said that "some Ukrainian troops have retreated to more advantageous, pre-prepared positions." By this time, about two-thirds of properties in the city were reportedly destroyed.

On 1 June, according to Ukraine, the Azot chemical plant was hit by Russian bombardment, and a nitric acid tank blew up, forcing people to stay indoors. On the following day, it was stated that around 800 civilians were hiding in bomb shelters beneath the Azot factory, which had also become a bastion of defence for some Ukrainian troops. Meanwhile, Governor Haidai said that Russian forces had reached the city's core. Ukrainian forces claimed they had captured six Russian soldiers.

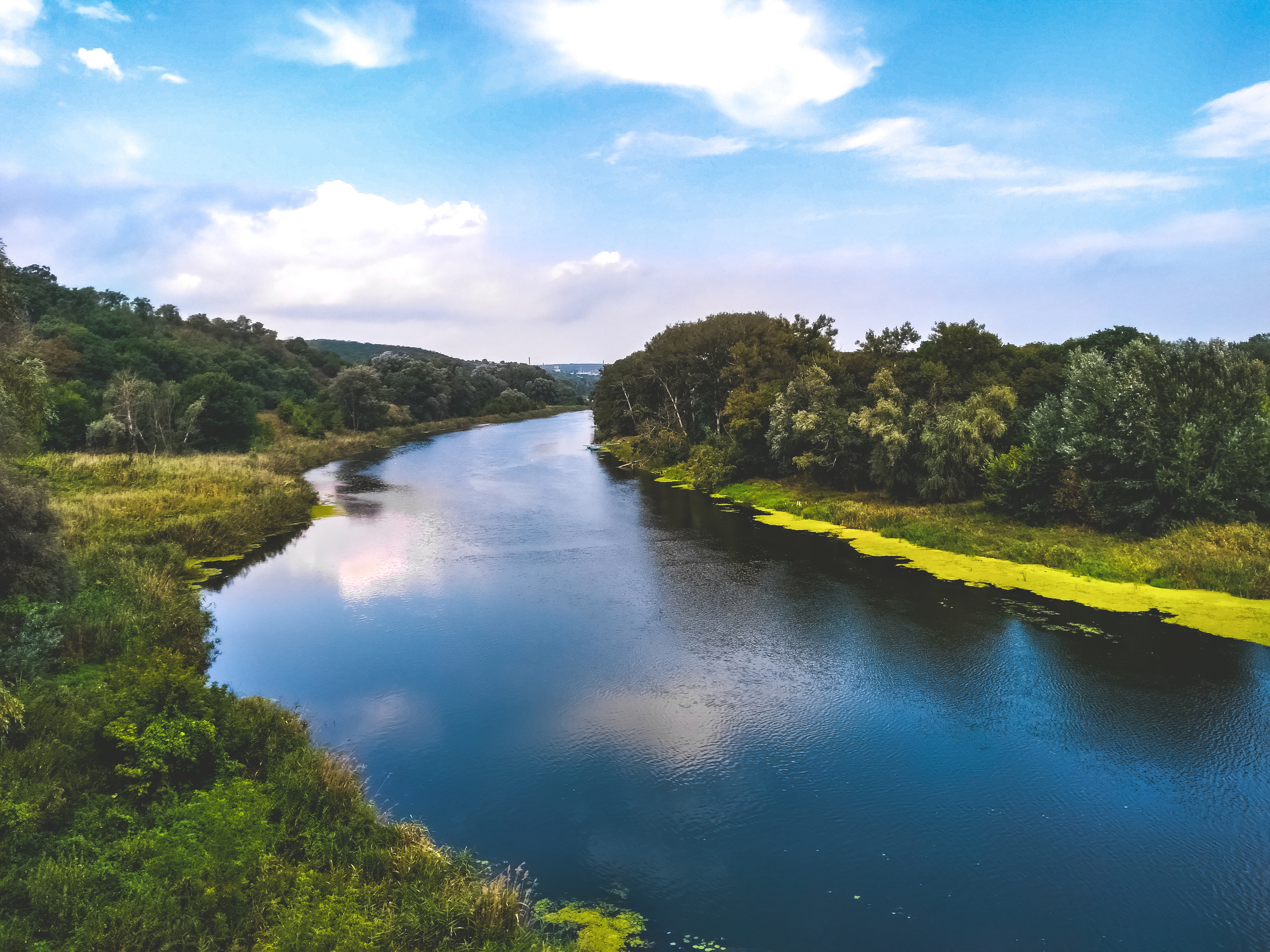
A view of the Donets in peacetime, taken from the Pavlohradskyi Bridge, now severely damaged

According to the United Kingdom's Ministry of Defence, as of 2 June, Russia had taken control of most of Sievierodonetsk. The following day, 3 June, a Ukrainian counterattack regained 20 per cent of the territory it had lost within the city. Haidai stated that Ukrainian forces had repulsed a number of Russian attacks and destroyed equipment. He also claimed that Russia was "throwing all their reserves at Sievierodonetsk" and it was "impossible to deliver food and medicine to the city". Haidai added that Russia was blowing up bridges over the Donets to prevent Ukrainian reinforcements and the delivery of aid. At least 12 members of the Ukrainian Foreign Legion were fighting in the city, including a Georgian and Portuguese national. According to Reuters, two of its journalists were wounded and their driver was killed near Sievierodonetsk.

Governor Haidai stated that Russian general Aleksandr Dvornikov had "received the task by June 10 of either completely capturing Sievierodonetsk, or completely cutting off the Lysychansk-Bakhmut highway and taking it under control." The UK Ministry of Defence said that Russia was using tactics similar to those used in Syria by using forces other than its own soldiers as a way to reduce Russian casualties, including soldiers from the Luhansk People's Republic (LPR). These soldiers were not as well trained or equipped as regular Russian soldiers.

On 6 June, Haidai described the Ukrainian situation: "Our defenders managed to counterattack for a while – they liberated almost half of the city. However, now the situation has worsened for us again." In regards to the Lysychansk-Sievierodonetsk road, he said the Russians "do not control this road, but the entire route is being shelled. The Russians have amassed huge reserves. Time will tell whether they will have enough strength to take this route." He described Russian forces as being "simply incredible" in terms of numbers and equipment. Russian forces, he reported, were implementing "standard scorched earth tactics." Major General Kyrylo Budanov, head of Ukrainian military intelligence, stated that Ukrainian forces were slowly advancing despite "a tenfold advantage of the enemy in artillery". Ukrainian president Volodymyr Zelenskyy visited Lysychansk and said "we're holding out" and "there are more of them and they are stronger", vowing that the Ukrainian army would not give up positions in the city despite apparent Russian tactical superiority on the front line.

The commander of the Ukrainian National Guard's Svoboda Battalion, Petro Kuzyk, described the street fighting as fierce and "horrifying". "There have been counterattack attempts – some successful, others not. There is constant pressure from their side. Some divisions had to pull back a block, while other divisions, including ours, were able to hold their positions. But all this is happening in extremely tough conditions," said Kuzyk, adding that they were "literally fighting for every house, every street. One day we might move one block forward, another day they push us back a block ... we can't rely solely on the infantry's stamina, we also need enough troops and resources such as tanks and artillery."

On 8 June the Ukrainian general staff said that it was "holding back" Russian attacks. However, military analysis said "it's difficult to know which army is in control of which territory." Haidai stressed that "nobody is going to give up the city, even if our military will have to pull back to more fortified positions, as the city is constantly being shelled. Still, it wouldn't mean the city is given up." Meanwhile, Russia stated that the "Ukrainian group in the Donbas suffers significant losses in manpower, weapons and military equipment". The UK Ministry of Defence observed that "it is unlikely that either side has gained significant ground in the last 24 hours." Later that day, Haidai admitted the Ukrainian army was pushed back to the outskirts of the city due to intense Russian bombardment. A lawyer representing Ukrainian oligarch Dmytro Firtash, the owner of the Azot chemical plant, said 800 civilians remained at the plant, 200 of whom were employees. Haidai said that Ukrainian forces could not rescue citizens left behind in the city.

On 9 June, Haidai said that more than 90% of the city was under Russian control. Svoboda Battalion commander Petro Kuzyk said the Ukrainians were deliberately drawing Russian infantry into urban warfare conditions as a tactic to negate artillery fire. He further claimed: "Yesterday was successful for us – we launched a counteroffensive and in some areas we managed to push them back one or two blocks. In others they pushed us back, but just by a building or two. Yesterday the occupiers suffered serious losses – if every day were like yesterday, this would all be over soon." Kuzyk again complained about a lack of artillery and medical supplies, saying "there is an order to hold our positions and we are holding them. It is unbelievable what the surgeons are doing without the proper equipment to save soldiers' lives."

On 10 June, the UK Ministry of Defence said: "As of 10 June, Russian forces around Sievierodonetsk have not made advances into the south of the city. Intense street-to-street fighting is ongoing and both sides are likely suffering high numbers of casualties."

On 11 June, LPR officials said there were talks underway with Ukrainian forces in the Azot plant regarding the evacuation of 500 civilians present at the air defence bunkers, another 400 Ukrainian servicemen were also present at the plant.

On 12 June, President Volodymyr Zelenskyy said both sides were fighting for "literally every metre." Valerii Zaluzhnyi, Ukrainian commander-in-chief, claimed that artillery gave the Russians a "tenfold advantage." According to Leonid Pasechnik, the head of the LPR, Ukrainian forces were the ones shelling Sievierodonetsk from the Azot plant. Haidai said the defenders' situation "...remains difficult. Fighting continues, but unfortunately, most of the city is under Russian control. Some positional battles are taking place in the streets." As to claims about the Azot plant: "The story about the blockade of the Azot plant is a complete lie spread by Russian propagandists." Haidai also told Ukrainian TV that Ukrainian forces were failing at street fighting, and that Russian artillery was winning the fighting in residential areas.

On 13 June, according to Governor Haidai, the last of three bridges connecting Sievierodonetsk to the rest of Ukraine was destroyed. Russian forces reportedly controlled 70 per cent of the city. Donetsk People's Republic (DPR) representative, Eduard Basurin, said to the media: "Ukrainian divisions that are there [in Sievierodonetsk] are there forever." The BBC reported that all three bridges that crossed the Donets river into the city had been destroyed.

By 14 June 2022, Ukrainian sources acknowledged that Russia controlled 80 per cent of the city and had cut off civilian evacuation routes.

=== Ukraine rejects surrender ultimatum ===
By 15 June, much of Sievierodonetsk was "largely in ruins" and Russia had urged Ukrainian defenders to stop "senseless resistance and lay down arms". Russian authorities said it had opened a humanitarian corridor from the Azot plant towards Russian territory while accusing Ukraine of disrupting evacuation efforts. Mayor Oleksandr Stryuk said Russian forces were storming the city from several directions but insisted Ukrainian forces were not completely cut off and evacuation routes still existed. On 15 June, the Russian ultimatum for Ukraine to surrender the city was ignored and clashes continued.

On 16 June, Ukrainian forces able to withdraw were reportedly ordered to withdraw towards Lysychansk. The Ukrainian General Staff claimed to "retain several logistics routes to Sievierodonetsk despite the destruction of four bridges". The next day, 17 June, Russian media reported that Ukrainian military personnel had "begun surrendering". Meanwhile, the ISW assessed that the battle had tied down Russian forces which could have been used elsewhere in the war, stating that Russia had "concentrated the vast majority of its available combat power to capture Sievierodonetsk and Lysychansk at the expense of other axes of advance and is suffering heavy casualties to do so."

On 18 June, Governor Serhiy Haidai wrote on Telegram: "Now the most fierce battles are near Sievierodonetsk. They [Russia] do not control the city entirely. Our defenders are fighting Russians in all directions." Ukraine claimed to have deployed AHS Krab to provide artillery support for their forces in the city. The Ukrainians also claimed to have inflicted heavy losses on Russia's 11th Separate Motorised Rifle Regiment, forcing it to withdraw "from the area of combat operations to restore combat capability." The Ukrainian general staff said that "as a result of artillery fire and an assault" Russian forces had partial success in the village of Metiolkine and were "trying to gain a foothold." Haidai referred to "tough battles" in the village, located southeast of the city. TASS claimed that "many" Ukrainian soldiers had surrendered.

On 19 June, fresh Russian assaults forced Ukraine to commit reinforcements to the defence of Toshkivka, located southeast of the city. Tanks and Grad launchers were seen being deployed to reinforce the area, with a tank crewman purportedly confirming their destination during a media interview. There were fears of a Russian pincer manoeuvre being used to entrap the Ukrainian forces in the Sievierodonetsk pocket, as the pocket was about 75% closed by Russian forces. The decision to hold onto Sievierodonetsk and continue fighting for the city was acknowledged by Ukrainian commanders as being risky, due to the risk of Russian encirclement. Former Ukrainian defence minister Andriy Zagorodnyuk said, "Right now, the main objective is to use the window of opportunity that we have to completely exhaust the Russians in the Donbas. If we would move, they would move. We would have to meet them somewhere. It's not like Putin wanted just Sievierodonetsk. They will keep going until they are stopped."

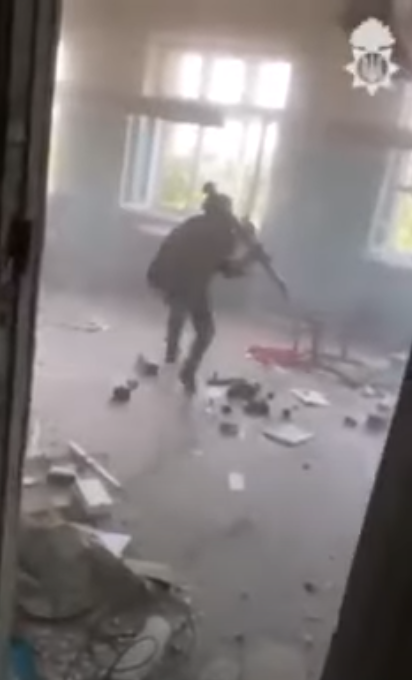
Ukrainian soldier with an RPG in Sievierodonetsk, 21 June 2022

Mayor Oleksandr Stryuk said on 20 June that Ukraine still controlled "more than one third" of the city. The same day, Governor Haidai confirmed Ukraine had lost control of Metiolkine to Russian forces and that "most" of Sievierodonetsk was under control of the Russian army, while the Ukrainian military controlled only the industrial zone and the territory of the Azot plant. He also said that the Lysychansk-Bakhmut road "had been shelled almost all day" while under firm Russian fire control. On 21 June, Haidai remarked on the adaptability of Russian units, saying they "monitor the air day and night with drones, adjusts firepower, quickly adapts to our changes in defensive areas."

On 22 June, the Ukrainians said they had lost control of the settlements of Toshkivka, Pidlisne and Myrna Dolyna, south of Lysychansk. On 23 June, Russian forces cut off and surrounded the towns of Hirske and Zolote, which they claimed to have fully captured by the next day.

=== Fall of Sievierodonetsk ===
On 24 June, Governor Haidai announced that Ukrainian forces were ordered to withdraw from the city, stating: "Remaining in positions that have been relentlessly shelled for months just doesn't make sense. They have received orders to retreat to new positions... and from there continue their operations." CNN reported that amid continuing scorched earth tactics being applied by advancing Russian troops, Ukraine's armed forces were ordered to evacuate the city, leaving several hundred civilians seeking refuge in the Azot chemical plant, which was compared to the civilian refugees left at the Azovstal steelworks in Mariupol a month prior in May. Concurrently, Russian sources stated that Ukrainian forces had suffered over 1,000 casualties, including 800 prisoners, in Hirske, Zolote, and near Lysychansk over the previous two days. The withdrawal had been taking place over the previous several days. The Ukrainian retreat over the Donets river was conducted mostly at night and the locations of the crossings were constantly changed due to Russian shelling. It is presumed no one was killed during the retreat.

On 25 June, Russian forces took full control of Sievierodonetsk following the Ukrainian military's withdrawal. Approximately 10,000 civilians remained in the city, ten per cent of the pre-war level.

The nearby settlements of Syrotyne, Voronove and Borivske were captured as well. At this time, Hanna Maliar, the Deputy Minister of Defense of Ukraine, publicly criticised civilians for allegedly disrupting military operations during the battle by sharing military information on social media.

== Aftermath ==
Oleksiy Arestovych, an advisor to Ukrainian president Volodymyr Zelenskyy, claimed that Ukrainian special forces remained behind in the city to direct artillery strikes. According to TASS, Ukrainian shelling prevented the evacuation of civilians from the Azot chemical plant hours after Ukrainian troops left. There was no mention of the Ukrainian special forces engaging Russian soldiers directly.

On 25 June, Russian and LPR forces began encircling Lysychansk.

In late June-early July, the Associated Press interviewed Ukrainian soldiers that retreated from Sievierodonetsk, some of whom called the battle "hell on Earth" and described the city as a "burnt-down desert." The second-in-command of the Ukraine National Guard's Svoboda Battalion, Lt. Volodymyr Nazarenko, said Russian tanks would destroy any potential defensive position during street engagements and that the city was "methodically leveled out" by daily shelling. Another soldier from the battalion remarked "those were not human conditions" they fought in, while also commending his comrades that held out before being ordered to withdraw, saying "the inner strength of our boys allowed them to hold the city until the last moment."

On 8 July, two weeks after Sievierodonetsk was captured, Luhansk governor Serhiy Haidai warned that living conditions in the city continued to deteriorate and the city was "on the verge of a humanitarian catastrophe" as critical infrastructure and utilities such as water, electricity, and the sewage system remained inoperable while un-recovered corpses decomposed in hot apartment buildings. Haidai said the Russians were "unable to repair anything" and continued to accuse Russian forces of using "scorched earth" tactics during their offensive. He added that 8,000 people remained in the city at this time.

== Casualties ==
Numerous attacks against civilian facilities occurred in Sievierodonetsk. On 17 March 2022, the Governor of Luhansk Oblast Serhiy Haidai reported that Russian forces had hit a shelter intended for mothers and children and declared that "there are no safe places in Luhansk Region anymore". On 22 March, Haidai said that the Russians had shelled a children's hospital and set the roof on fire, although no one was wounded. Damage to local churches was also reported. On 7 April 2022, Russian forces reportedly struck a humanitarian aid centre and set 10 high-rise buildings on fire in the city.

In Lysychansk, 150 civilians killed in the city due to Russian strikes were reportedly buried in a mass grave on 25 May. On 27 May, the mayor of Sievierodonetsk announced that more than 1,500 civilians had been killed since the start of the Russian invasion on 24 February 2022.

By 30 May, the shelling had become so intense that Ukrainian officials had stopped counting casualties.

On 14 June, Ukrainian president Zelenskyy called for more foreign military aid, calling the human cost of the battle for Sievierodonetsk, Lysychansk and the surrounding region "terrifying".

On 8 July, Ukraine's governor of Luhansk province, Serhiy Haidai, claimed that hundreds of Kadyrovites died during the battle for Sievierodonetsk, but did not provide an exact number. He also claimed one of the leaders of the Chechen division of Russia's National Guard was seriously wounded during clashes and "may be on the verge of life and death".

== Analysis ==
The Institute for the Study of War (ISW) assessed on 28 May that the Russian military was directing a large part of its combat-effective forces into the battle for Sievierodonetsk, weakening other front lines and risking exhausting its "remaining" troops. The ISW cautioned that the effort invested in the capture of Sievierodonetsk did not seem fitting for the location's limited strategic value. Ukrainian military analyst Oleh Zhdanov believed this was the last offensive Russia was able to undertake before Western military aid reached Ukrainian forces. There were reports at the time that Ukrainian forces may be withdrawing to preserve their forces.

On 4 June, the British Ministry of Defence said a Ukrainian counterattack in Sievierodonetsk had successfully slowed Russian momentum. The ISW observed that Ukraine seemed to be maintaining a flexible defence of the city, with an aim of inflicting Russian casualties rather than holding all of Sievierodonetsk. Reportedly, following an advance on 5 June that recaptured approximately half of the city, Ukrainian forces pulled back after a Russian bombardment the next day. On 6 June, Frederick Kagan said that Russian forces were "crawling forward using massive artillery barrages to obliterate everything in its path," allowing Russia's "demoralized and frightened" soldiers to advance. The Ukrainian chief of staff, Valeriy Zaluzhny wrote on 12 June: "[The Russians] use artillery en masse and, unfortunately, they have a tenfold fire advantage. Despite everything, we keep holding our positions ... the situation is complicated, in particular, in the city of Sievierodonetsk. Up to seven battalion tactical groups were deployed by the enemy there. Despite the heavy fire, we managed to stop the enemy."

On 17 June, Petro Kuzyk, commander of the Ukrainian Svoboda Battalion which partook in the battle, gave his analysis of the ongoing fighting in the city. He claimed that Ukraine controlled 40–60 per cent of the city, however the lines were constantly shifting. He complained of the supplies of Western weapons, saying "We need serious equipment and need more tanks. At the moment, we're getting equipment for infantry soldiers. As a result, we have to fight a guerrilla war." Describing the Russian forces, he said "They have the tactic that if they see Ukrainians holding a position they do not attack or capture the buildings. They just level them," and that Russian tanks were "hitting us from a distance of two kilometres and hiding behind buildings." Kuzyk acknowledged the destruction of the three bridges linking to the city, but said Ukrainians were now using "boats, ropes, even swimming" to cross the river. He also expressed fear of a potential "ecological catastrophe" at the Azot chemical plant if "an unpredictable explosion happens."

The ISW wrote on 20 June that Russian forces were likely to capture Sievierodonetsk "in the coming weeks, but at the cost of concentrating most of their available forces in this small area." Serhiy Haidai stated on 23 June that Ukrainian troops may have to retreat to avoid encirclement in Lysychansk, while the ISW continued to assess that the Ukrainians "succeeded for weeks in drawing substantial quantities of Russian personnel, weapons, and equipment into the area and have likely degraded Russian forces' overall capabilities while preventing Russian forces from focusing on more advantageous axes of advance." Sievierodonetsk fell five days later.

On 22 February 2023, Kyrylo Budanov described the defeat at Sievierodonetsk as one of the three major Ukrainian defeats up to that point during the Russo-Ukrainian War, the other two being the defeat at the battle of Volnovakha and the occupation of Crimea and parts of Donetsk and Luhansk oblasts by Russia in 2014.

== See also ==
- Battle of Lysychansk
- Battles of Sievierodonetsk (2014)
- List of military engagements during the Russian invasion of Ukraine
