= Borivske =

Borivske (Ukrainian: Борівське) where Ukrainian: Бір (бори́) means coniferous forest(s). It may refer to the following places in Ukraine:

- Borivske, Kharkiv Oblast
- Borivske, Luhansk Oblast
- Borivske, Poltava Oblast
- Borivske, Vinnytsia Oblast
