= Kaplan MT / Harimau =

Turkish-Indonesian medium tank / light tank

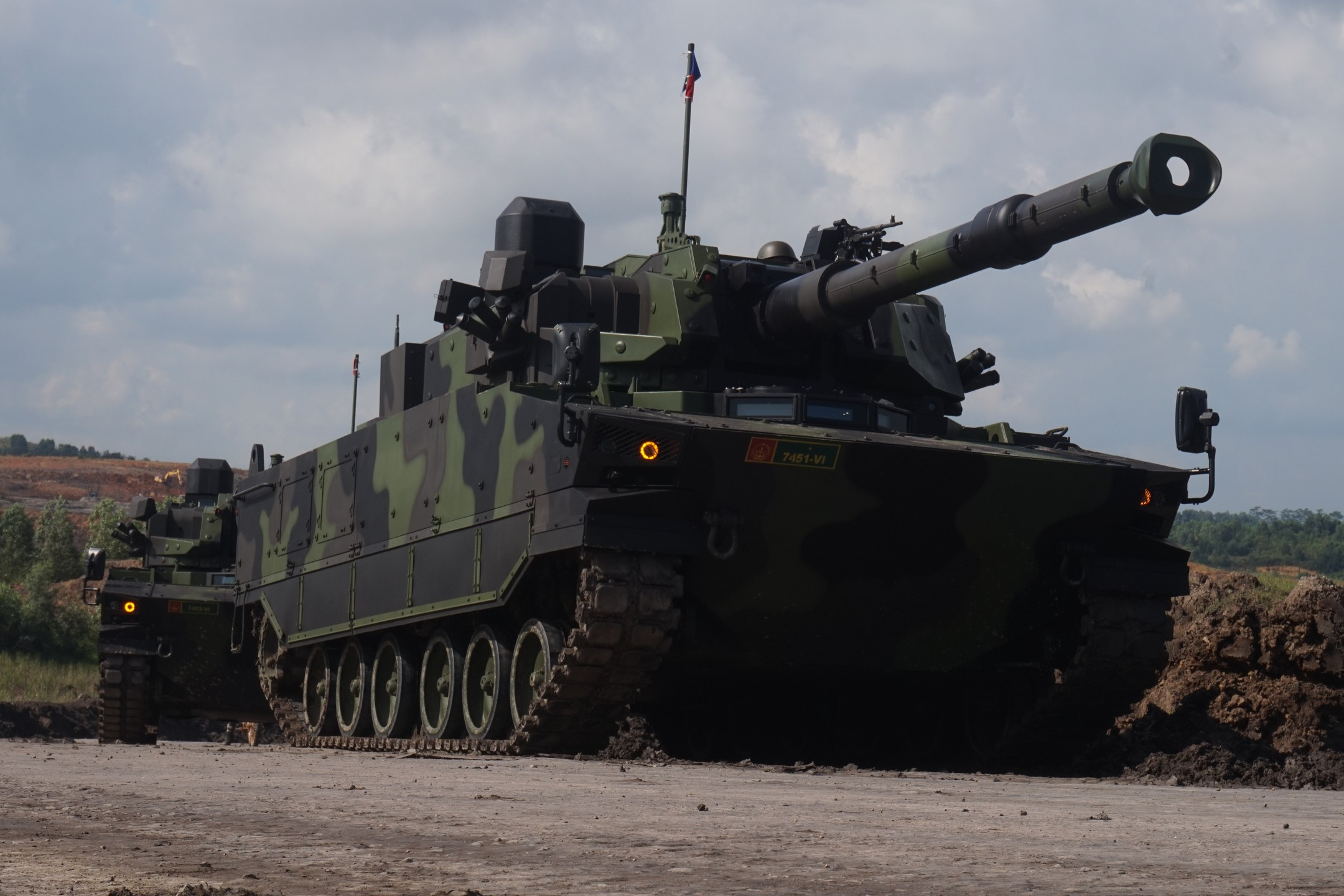
- Indonesian Army Harimau Medium Tanks, 13th Cavalry Battalion, 2024
- Type: Medium MBT; Variants: Fire Support Combat Vehicle; Armored Personnel Carrier
- Place of origin: Turkey/Indonesia

Production history
- Designer: FNSS; PT Pindad
- Designed: 2015
- Produced: 2017–present
- No. built: 18 (Plan: 412 Unit)

Specifications
- Mass: 30–35 tonnes
- Length: 6.952 m (22.8 ft) hull, 9.105 m (29.9 ft) including the gun
- Width: 3.360 m (11 ft)
- Height: 2.456 m (8.06 ft) turret top
- Crew: 3 (commander, gunner, driver)
- Armor: STANAG 4569 level 4 Ballistic Hull STANAG 4569 Level 5 Modular Add-on Armour V-hull underbelly
- Main armament: Cockerill 105 mm high-pressure rifled gun
- Secondary armament: 2 × 7.62 mm machine gun
- Engine: Caterpillar C13 diesel engine inline-6 711 hp
- Power/weight: 22.2 hp/t
- Transmission: Allison/Caterpillar X300 full automatic
- Suspension: Torsion bar suspension
- Maximum speed: 70 km/h (governed), 78 km/h (tested road speed)

Kaplan MT or Harimau is a medium main battle tank jointly developed by Turkish manufacturer FNSS and Indonesian manufacturer Pindad. The development program name for the tank is Modern Medium Weight Tank (MMWT). The tank itself is called Kaplan MT by Turkey and Harimau by Indonesia, both meaning "tiger".

== History ==
The governments of Indonesia and Turkey first agreed in May 2015 to jointly develop the MMWT for the Indonesian Army at a reported cost of 30 million US dollars. The development phase of the program was expected to take up to 37 months, with the first prototype being built in Turkey, and the second in Indonesia. It was agreed that the two countries would jointly own the intellectual property of the design.

On 1 November 2016, during the 2016 Indo Defence Expo, the first model of the tank was unveiled, along with some technical specifications. Most notably, the vehicle's overall weight was reported to be around 35 tonnes, and the main armament would be provided by a Belgian-made turret developed by CMI Defence featuring a 105 mm rifled barrel, capable of firing a wide range of projectiles.

On 9 May 2017 at the IDEF 2017 expo, the first prototype of the tank was revealed. The tank can be fitted with either a Cockerill XC-8 105mm concept turret or Cockerill 3105 modular turret. Additionally, the tank utilizes modular armor, allowing for quick replacement upon damage.

On 5 September 2018, the general manager of FNSS told Turkey's Anadolu Agency that the tank had passed months of required qualification tests for the Indonesian Army, and was ready for mass production. He stated that the first batch of 20 to 25 tanks could be ordered as early as late 2018, and that the full number of tanks to be produced would likely fall between 200 and 400.

On 7 February 2020, it was announced that mass production of the MMWT has started.

In IDEF 2021 (17–20 August 2021), the production model of Harimau / Kaplan MT is revealed. Many improvements were made to the tank during the transition from prototype to mass production. In this context, driver visibility and handling ergonomics have been improved. The body design was perfected in line with the feedback from the end user. Based on the experience gained from the tests, improvements were made in the tower system, power transmission group, cooling system and suspension system.

One of the prototype tanks underwent series of firing tests on 24–25 February 2022 at Army Infantry Education Center Cipatat, West Bandung Regency as part of the Factory Acceptance Trials (FAT). The tank fired several rounds of HEP-T (High Explosive Plastic Tracer) and TPCSDS-T (Target Practice Cone Stabilized Discarding Sabot with Tracer) at 4x4 meters target from range of 1,250 meters in various firing positions. The tank then underwent mobility tests at a section of Padalarang-Bandung toll highway and at PT Pindad facility. On 15 March 2022, a ceremony was held to mark the official completion of the first batch of 10 tanks produced at FNSS facility in Turkey. The remaining 8 turretless hull were to be sent to Indonesia after the ceremony for final turret assembly and delivery to the Indonesian Army. The second batch production of 8 tanks will be built by PT Pindad in Indonesia with FNSS assistance.

== Design ==
=== Armament ===
The MMWT is equipped with a Cockerill CT-CV 105HP (High Pressure) 105 mm rifled gun manufactured by CMI (Cockerill Maintenance & Ingenierie SA Defense), with the barrel mounting a bore evacuator and thermal jacket. The turret is equipped with an autoloader and can be rotated 360 degrees both electronically and mechanically, with a maximum elevation/depression of 42 up to -10 degrees, and is equipped with a Gun stabilizer and Fire Control System. It is also equipped with an IFF system, Hunter Killer System for target selection, and Auto Target Locking System to assist the gunner.

=== Armor ===
The hull armor of MMWT is using modular armor. It is categorized as STANAG 4569 level 4 protection, which means the tank can withstand 14.5×114mm AP rounds at 200 meters with 911 m/s velocity. The underbelly of the tank uses V-hull, able to withstand 10 kg AT mine under the tracks and under the center. Due to modularity, the armor can be augmented to level 5 protection (withstand 25 mm APDS-T at 500 m with 1258 m/s velocity) without increasing the volume of the tank, with the frontal arc able to withstand 30 mm rounds.

=== Mobility ===
Dynamic and mobility test taken in 7–16 August 2018 to prove the specification design. The tank uses a Caterpillar C13 diesel engine generating 711 hp, coupled with Allison/Caterpillar X300 transmission. During the test the tank is able to reach 78 km/h in road speed. The prototype is able to cross 2 m trench and 0.9 m vertical obstacle.

=== Defensive Systems ===
The MMWT's survivability has been further strengthened. A modular PULAT active protection system joint-developed by ASELSAN and TUBITAK SAGE can be integrated. This ensures the tank's defensive capabilities against projectiles at all-angles.

== Variants ==
=== Harimau Gen 1 ===
The standard version of the medium tank was jointly developed by PT Pindad and FNSS Türkiye (known in Türkiye as Kaplan MT). Equipped with a Cockerill 3105 turret armed with a 105 mm high-pressure gun and an autoloader.

=== Kaplan / Harimau APC ===
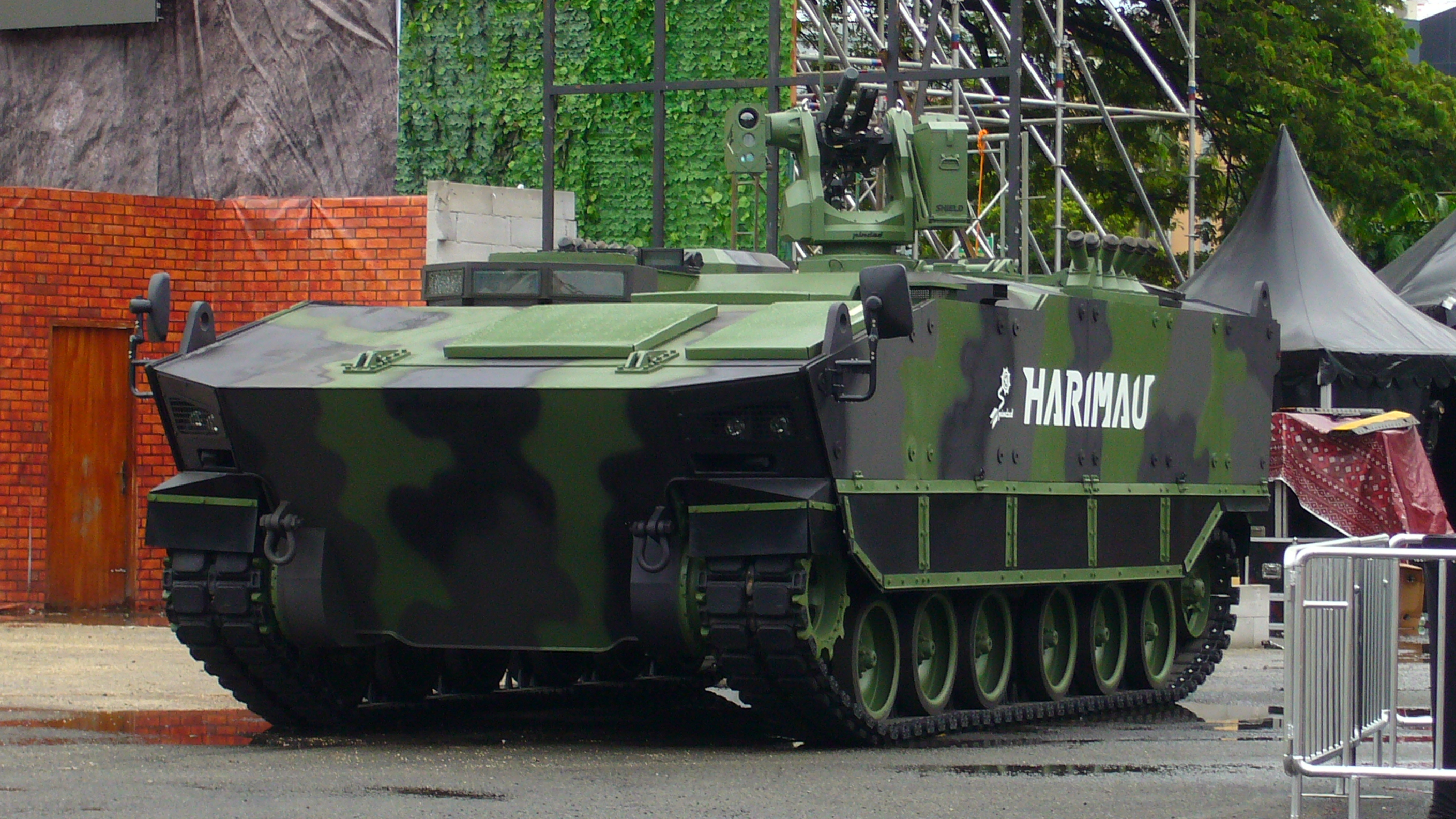
Harimau APC in Indo Defence 2024

FNSS and Pindad signed an agreement in October 2024 to produce two prototypes of armored personnel carrier (APC) variant of the MMWT platform to meet the Indonesian Army contract for 30-tonnes tracked armored personnel carrier. The first prototype was built by FNSS and the second by Pindad, with both units to be delivered by 2026. The APC has a crew of three—the driver, gunner, vehicle commander—and could carry 10 troops. The Kaplan / Harimau APC was designed to be modular and could be fitted with various manned or unmanned turrets. The first Harimau APC was unveiled at the 2024 Indo Defence Expo held on 11–14 June 2025.

=== Kaplan FSRV ===
Kaplan Fire Support and Reconnaissance Vehicle (FSRV) is a Turkish tracked armoured fighting vehicle by FNSS, derived from the Kaplan MT. Unveiled at IDEF 2025 in Istanbul, it pairs the Kaplan chassis with the TEBER-II 30/40 two-crew turret mounting a convertible 30 mm to 40 mm autocannon, plus twin launchers for ATGMs or loitering munitions integrated at each sides of the turret with 4 extra stored missiles under armour compartment. Its suite includes battle-management, standard thermal sights and LSR, and automatic target tracking—with options for 360 cameras, a tube-launched or tethered drones for recon and Electronic Warfare packages. The FSRV platform is intended for ISTAR missions (intelligence, surveillance, target acquisition, and reconnaissance) and for providing direct fire support ahead of the main force, with configurations tailored for urban and drone-contested environments.

=== CFL-120 "Karpat" ===
The CFL-120 Karpat light tank was unveiled at the IDEB 2026 defense exhibition in Bratislava. The vehicle is designed to provide firepower on par with main battle tanks while offering increased mobility at a significantly lower weight of only 34 tons. The vehicle uses the HITFACT Mk. II turret from Leonardo and the 120 mm cannon can be swapped out for a 105 mm cannon. The CFL-120 Karpat effectively combines the mobility of the Kaplan MT medium tank chassis with the firepower of a main battle tank.

== Operators ==
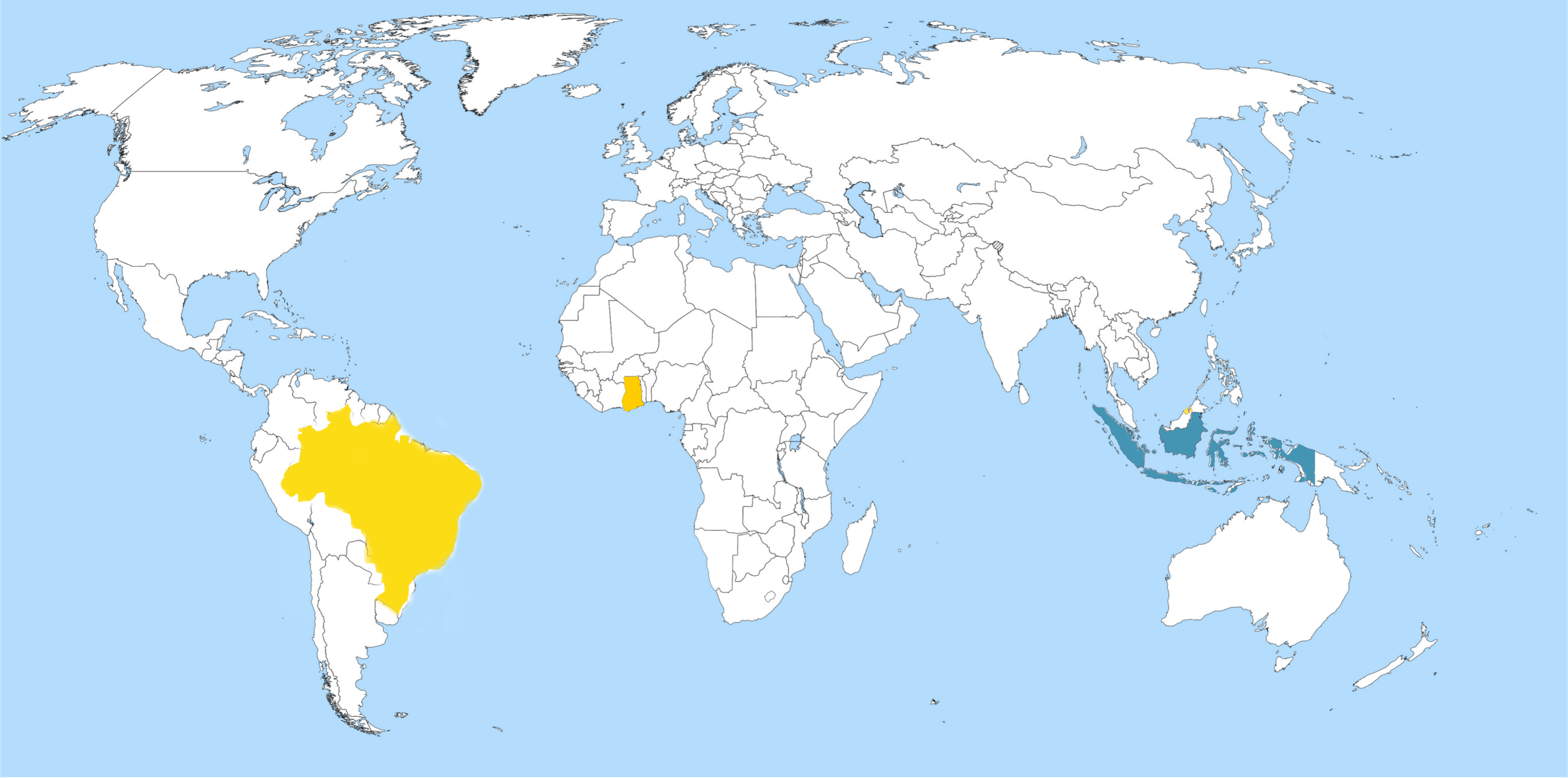
User countries are in blue and potential user countries are in yellow

=== Current operators ===
- Indonesia: 18 operational as of October 2024.

=== Potential operators ===
- Brazil: The Kaplan MT is a contender in the Army Strategic Program Armored Forces of the Brazilian Army to supply 65 MBTs and 78 IFVs.
- Brunei: Expressed interest in November 2018.
- Ghana: Expressed interest in November 2019.
- Slovakia: The CFL-120 Karpat is in the final round of Slovakia's light tank procurement program, going against the CV90120.

=== Failed bids ===
- Bangladesh: Expressed interest in September 2018, but later opted for VT-5 light tank.
- Philippines: Expressed interest in September 2018. From August 2020, the Department of National Defense (Philippines) released Notice of Award favoring Sabrah light tank over the Kaplan MT / Harimau.

== See also ==
=== Contemporary competitors ===
- M10 Booker – (United States)
- Type 15 tank – (China), or VT-5 (export model)
- Sabrah light tank – (Israel, Spain, Czech Republic)
- Zorawar LT – (India)
- K21-105 Medium tank – (South Korea)

=== Tanks with similar firepower ===
- CV90105 – (Sweden)
- K21-105 – (South Korea)
- M8 Armored Gun System – (United States)
- 2S25 Sprut-SD – (Russia)
- TAM – (Argentina)
- WPB Anders – (Poland)
