= Battles of Sievierodonetsk (2014) =

Battles in the War of Donbas, eastern Ukraine

Battles of Sieverodonetsk
- Part of War in Donbas
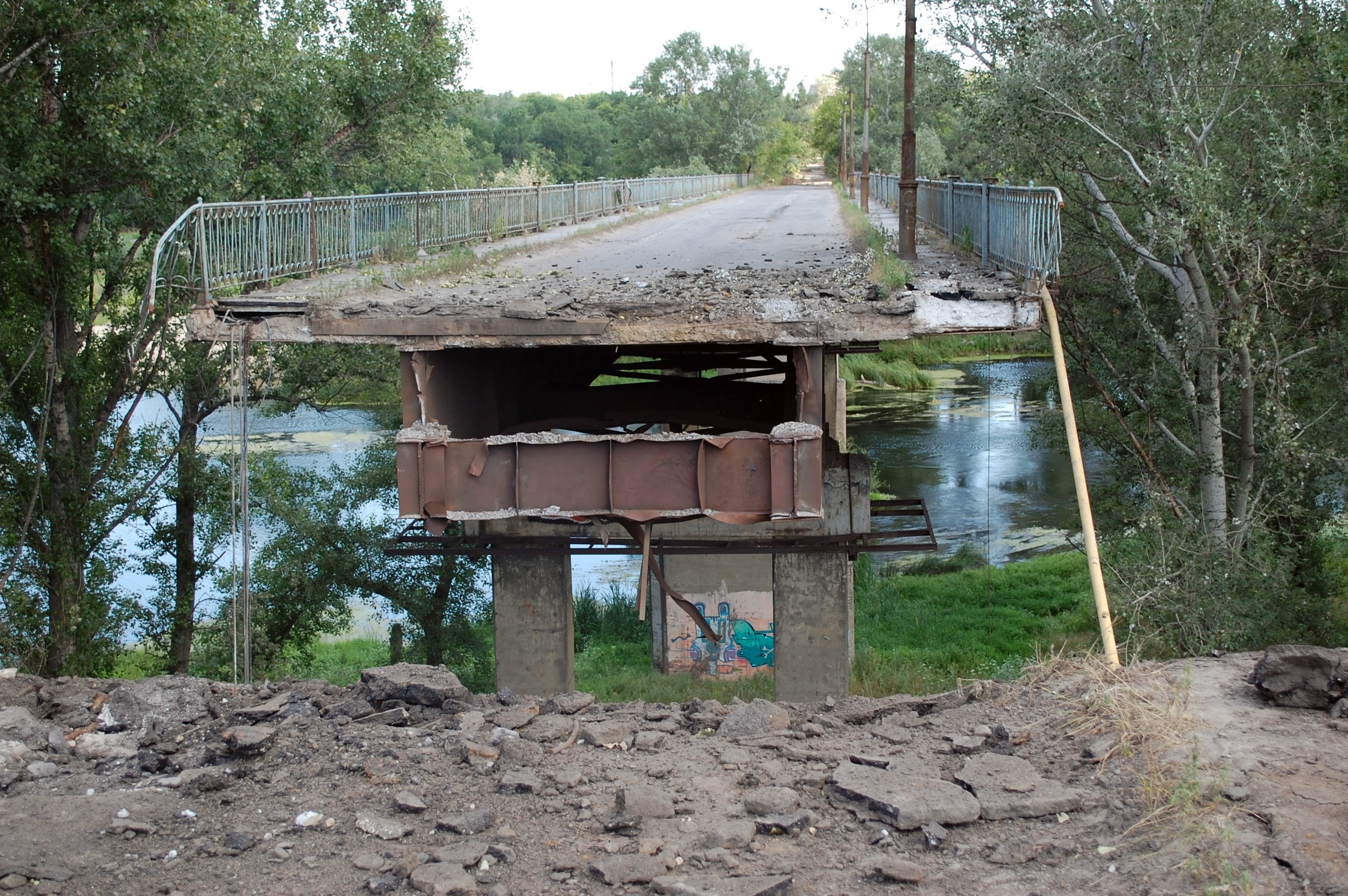
- A bridge connecting Sievierodonetsk and Lysychansk destroyed in the fighting
Date	22 May – 22 July 2014 (2 months)
Location	Sievierodonetsk, Luhansk Oblast, Ukraine
Result	Ukrainian victory: LPR retreats from the city cluster
Territorial changes	Sievierodonetsk comes under Ukrainian control

Belligerents
Ukraine	Luhansk People's Republic

Units involved
Armed Forces of Ukraine: 30th Mechanized Brigade; Ministry of Internal Affairs of Ukraine; National Guard of Ukraine; 21st Public Order Brigade	Army of the Southeast

Casualties and losses
17 killed 48 wounded 2 armored vehicles destroyed	42+ killed 100+ wounded

The battles of Sievierodonetsk were a series of battles between Ukrainian troops and Luhansk People's Republic formations during the war in Donbas in and around the Eastern Ukrainian cluster of cities of Rubizhne, Lysychansk, and Sieverodonetsk for control.

== Timeline ==
On 22 May 2014, a convoy from the 30th Mechanized Brigade of the Armed Forces of Ukraine entered the city of Rubizhne. After that, it turned towards Lysychansk and Sievierodonetsk. Along the way, the convoy was fired upon with grenade launchers and small arms by LPR separatists from Pavel Dryomov's detachment. During the battle, Ukrainian Armed Forces lost two infantry fighting vehicles and a cargo Ural with an anti-aircraft gun in the back.

At the end of May 2014, there was heavy fighting between LPR separatists and units of the National Guard of Ukraine. The media reported on the use by the Ukrainian army of mortars, howitzers, Tyulpan self-propelled mortars and Grad multiple launch rocket systems.

On 22 July 2014, the LPR separatists retreated from Sievierodonetsk. Units of the National Guard of Ukraine entered the city.

On 23 July 2014, the Armed Forces of Ukraine and the National Guard of Ukraine continued to engage in street fighting with the separatists. According to the fighters of the National Guard, they found one howitzer, more than 50 kilograms of plastids, 15 high-explosive shells and other ammunition in the city. The fighting continued until 24 July, when in the city of Lysychansk, a Colonel of the NSU Alexander Vitalyevich Radievsky, who was posthumously awarded the rank of Major General, was killed by separatists.
