= Begleitpanzer 57 AIFSV =

German prototype infantry fighting vehicle

Begleitpanzer 57
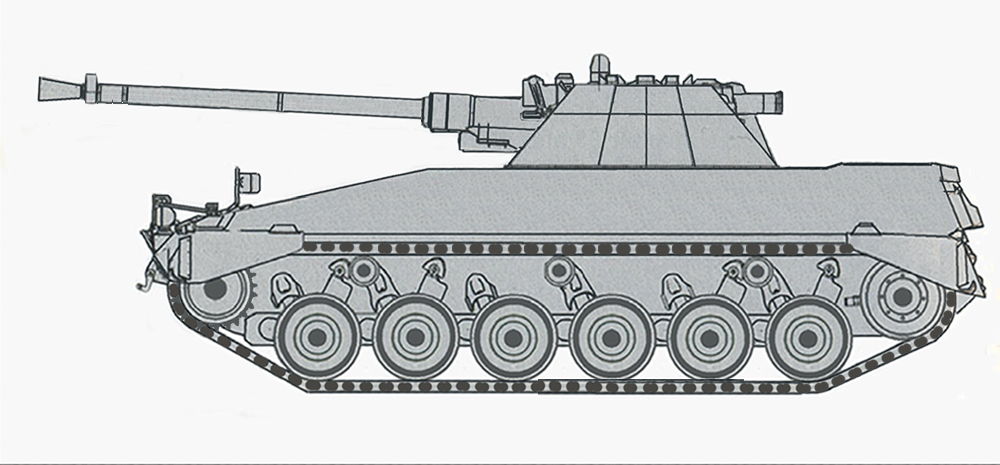
- Begleitpanzer 57 side-view.
- Type: Infantry fighting vehicle Fire Support Combat Vehicle
- Place of origin: West Germany

Production history
- Produced: 1977
- No. built: 1 Prototype

Specifications
- Mass: 33.5 t (36.9 short tons)
- Length: 6.79 m (22 ft 3 in) (hull only); 7.48 m (24 ft 6 in) (gun forward)
- Width: 3.24 m (10 ft 8 in)
- Height: 2.51 m (8 ft 3 in)
- Crew: 5
- Main armament: Bofors 57 mm SAK L/70 Mk1
- Secondary armament: BGM-71 TOW
- Maximum speed: 75 km/h (47 mph)

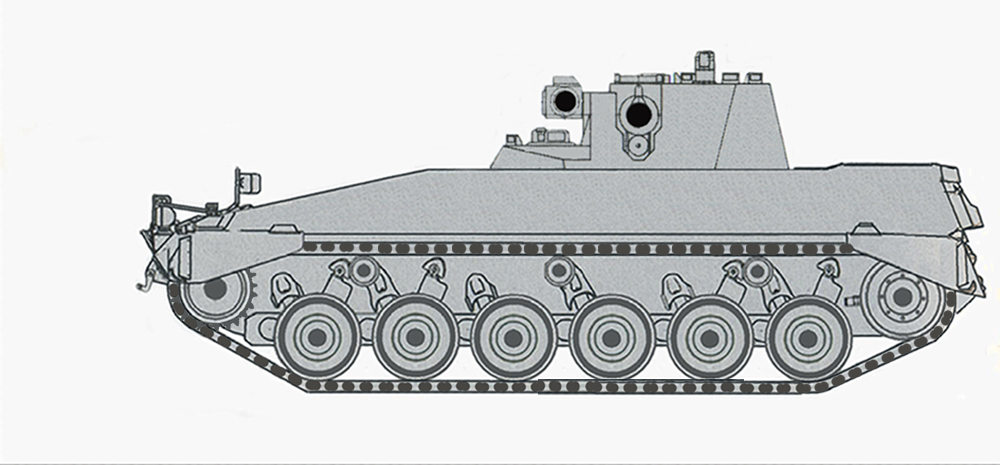
Side view with turret in 9 o'clock position

The Begleitpanzer 57 (Escort Tank 57) armored infantry fire support vehicle (AIFSV) was a project of the companies Thyssen-Henschel and Bofors. Only a single prototype was built. It consists of a modified Marder chassis carrying a Bofors 57 mm Naval Automatic Gun L/70 Mark 1 and a TOW ATGM.

In the mid-1970s, the two then-existing companies Thyssen-Henschel and Bofors began without government mandate the development of an infantry escort tank, to fill the niche of a light fire support platform. The vehicle was first introduced in November 1977. However, due to lack of interest from potential buyers, the project was not pursued.

== Description ==
The modified hull of the armored personnel carrier Marder was used as chassis. Here all the components of the infantry fighting vehicle, such as bullet covers, rear MG, tailgate and hatchways of the crew compartment had been removed to accommodate the much larger turret and associated equipment.

The technical data corresponded to those of the Marder, except

- the length with cannon in 12 o'clock position: 7.48 m;
- the height: 2,51 m.

The asymmetrically shaped turret resembles the Marder turret. On the left of the turret ceiling is the hatch of the commander with angle mirrors and a stabilized round periscope. On the right side of the turret is the gunner's hatch, with access to the exterior TOW launcher. The launcher operated with a telescope with night vision, a laser rangefinder and tracked control system for the missiles. For the commander, there was a monitor with parallel information.

The turret had a recess in the middle in the longitudinal direction, in which the external, crest-fixed pipe cradle was mounted, holding the Bofors 57 mm Naval Automatic Gun L/70 Mk 1. The cannon had an autoloader and moved in the elevation range from -8° to +45°. The vehicle carried an ammunition supply of 48 cartridges 57 mm ammunition, with six BGM-71 TOW anti-tank guided missiles.

57 mm ammunition types

- armour-piercing, capped, ballistic capped (APCBC)
- semi armor-piercing, high-explosive, capped, ballistic capped (SAPHE-CBC)
- high explosive (HE)
- high explosive, proximity fuze (HEVT)
