= 21st Public Order Brigade =

21st Public Order Protection Brigade
- 21-ша окрема бригада охорони громадського порядку (Ukrainian)
- Brigade Insignia
- Founded: 1992
- Country: Ukraine
- Allegiance: Ministry of Internal Affairs
- Branch: National Guard of Ukraine
- Type: Brigade
- Role: Law enforcement, protection of the Ukrainian territorial integrity
- Part of: National Guard of Ukraine
- Garrison/HQ: Kropyvnytskyi and Kryvyi Rih
- Nickname: Petro Kalnyshevsky Brigade
- Patron: Petro Kalnyshevsky
- Engagements: Russo-Ukrainian war: War in Donbas; Battles of Sievierodonetsk; Battle of Marinka; Russian invasion of Ukraine; Siege of Mariupol

Commanders
- Current commander: Colonel Oleksandr Gennadiyovych Alenin
- Notable commanders: Colonel Oleksandr Vitaliyovych Radievskyi †

Insignia
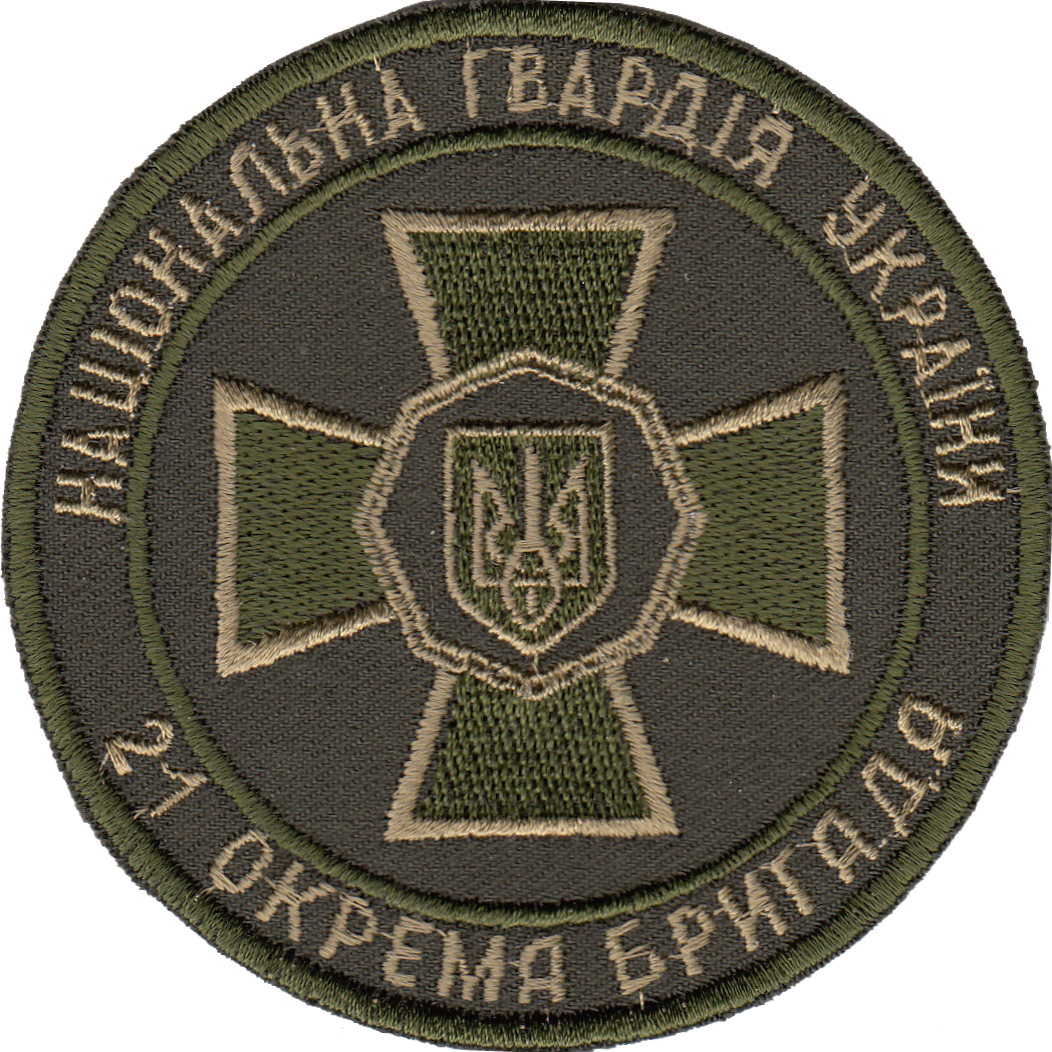
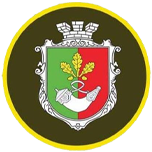
- Former Insignia

Personal of the Brigade securing a parameter after the Russian missile attack on Kryvyi Rih on 20 November 2026

The 21st Separate Public Order Protection Brigade named after Petro Kalnyshevskyi is a law enforcement brigade of the National Guard of Ukraine tasked with protection of the law and order as well as the territorial integrity of Ukraine. It was established in 1992 on the basis of the 25th Separate Special Motorized Militia Battalion as the 6th Regiment. The brigade's main headquarters is in Kryvyi Rih but some parts of it are garrisoned at Kropyvnytskyi.

== History ==
On 2 January 1992, it was established on the basis of the 25th Separate Special Motorized Militia Battalion as the 6th Regiment of the National Guard of Ukraine being transferred to the Internal Troops of Ukraine on 26 January 1995, becoming the 21st Separate Special Motorized Police Brigade.

In 2014, the brigade was renamed as the 21st Public Order Protection Brigade and became part of the National Guard of Ukraine.

With the beginning of the War in Donbass, the regiment destroyed multiple separatist outposts during the liberation of Mykolaivka, Semenivka, and Sloviansk. On 23 July 2014, the brigade took part in the Battles of Sievierodonetsk (2014) during which the regiment's forces were ambushed while crossing a bridge. During the ambush, the commander of the brigade, Oleksandr Vitaliyovych Radievskyi was killed along with two other soldiers (Pavlo Leonidovych Snitsar and Ihor Oleksandrovych Kotsar) who were also killed in the ambush.

The brigade also saw combat in the Battle of Marinka enforcing ceasefire, during which on 12 March 2016, a soldier of the brigade (Oleksandr Mykolayovych Svirskyi) was killed as a result of the injuries sustained in the battle.

On 23 August 2018, the brigade was awarded the honorary name of "Petro Kalnyshevsky", the last Kish otaman of the Zaporozhian Sich of Ukraine.

Since 8 February 2022, the brigade performed duty in Mariupol and was deployed in the city when the Russian invasion of Ukraine started on 24 February, and took part in the Siege of Mariupol, some of its personnel were trapped in the Azovstal Steel plant where a female soldier of the brigade (Lyudmila Frankivna Usenko) was killed on 8 May 2022 as a result of a Russian missile strike. After the capture of Mariupol, some personnel of the regiment were taken captive amongst them Konstantin Sychak was officially sentenced to 26 years in prison on 7 August 2023.

In 2024, the brigade was fighting in Zaporizhzhia Oblast where the personnel of the brigade captured a Russian Marine in April 2024 in the village of Urozhaine.

== Structure ==
- 1st Patrol Battalion
- 2nd Patrol Battalion (Kryvyi Rih)
- 3rd Rifle Battalion (Kropyvnytskyi)
- Operational Assignment Battalion
- Combat Support Battalion
- Mortar Battery
- Medical Center

== Commanders ==
- Colonel Oleksandr Leonidovych Golyakov (2001–2011)
- Colonel Oleksandr Vitaliyovych Radievskyi † (2011–2014)
- Colonel Andrii Volodymyrovych Prykhodko (2014–2015)
- Colonel Vyacheslav Mykhailovych Melnyk (2015–2018)
- Colonel Oleksandr Gennadiyovych Alenin (2018–2019)
- Colonel Volodymyr Bilousov (2019-)

== Sources ==
- Військова частина 3011 Національної гвардії України
- Криворізькі нацгвардійці вшанували пам'ять воїнів — героїв АТО
- Криворізькі нацгвардійці здійснили польовий вихід
- У Нацгвардії тривають навчання підрозділів протиповітряної оборони
- Дводенний марш бронетехніки Криворізької бригади Нацгвардії
