= National Council of Bessarabia =

Separatist organisation

The National Council of Bessarabia was a separatist organisation headed by Dmitriy Zatuliveter, of the previously obscure Organization of Transnistrians in Ukraine. It arose in 2014, following the Russian military intervention in Ukraine.

== Overview ==
The group released a manifesto on a Russian-registered website in which it decried "discrimination" against ethnic minorities in the region, and called for far greater autonomy in the Budjak region even while nominally rejecting separatism. Ukrainian authorities took swift action, with the SBU making two dozen arrests. This led one Ukrainian site to claim that the movement had been "smothered in its cradle".

Party of Regions and Bulgarian minority leader in the Budjak, Anton Kisse, have been denying any connection to the movement and even rejected it.

A briefing paper published by the Estonian think-tank International Centre for Defence and Security suggested the council aimed to link with separatists in Moldova's Gagauzia and Transnistria. However, the lack of a land connection between Budjak and the latter was crucial in the project's demise.

== See also ==
- Luhansk People's Republic
- Donetsk People's Republic
- Republic of Stakhanov
- Luhansk status referendum, 2014
- 2014 pro-Russian conflict in Ukraine
- Novorossiya (confederation)
