= Fire Support Combat Vehicle =

Type of heavy tracked armoured vehicle

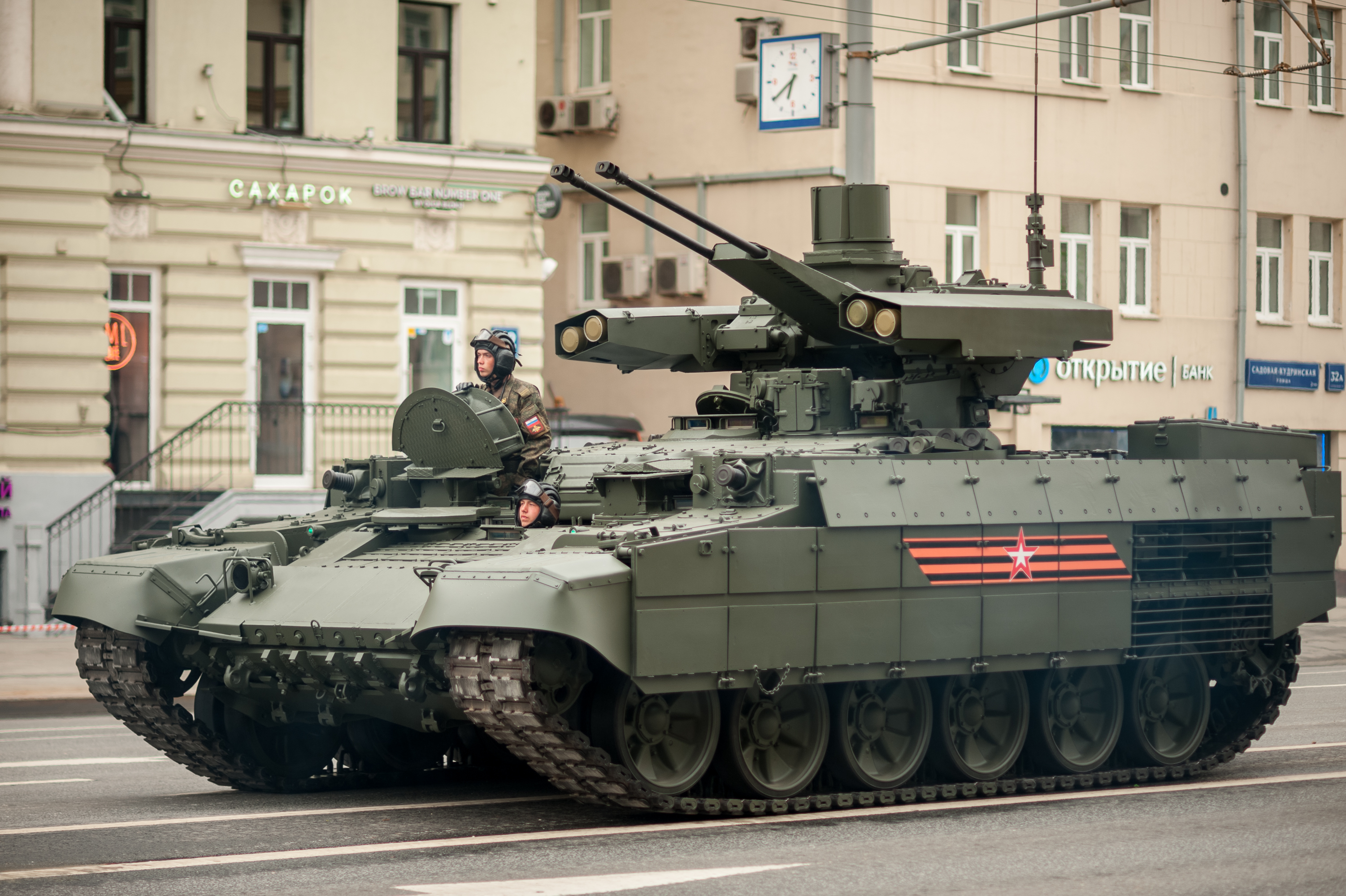
FSCV BMPT Terminator, armed with two 30 mm Shipunov 2A42 autocannons, and four 130 mm 9M120 Ataka ATGMs and two 30 mm AGS-30 automatic grenade launchers

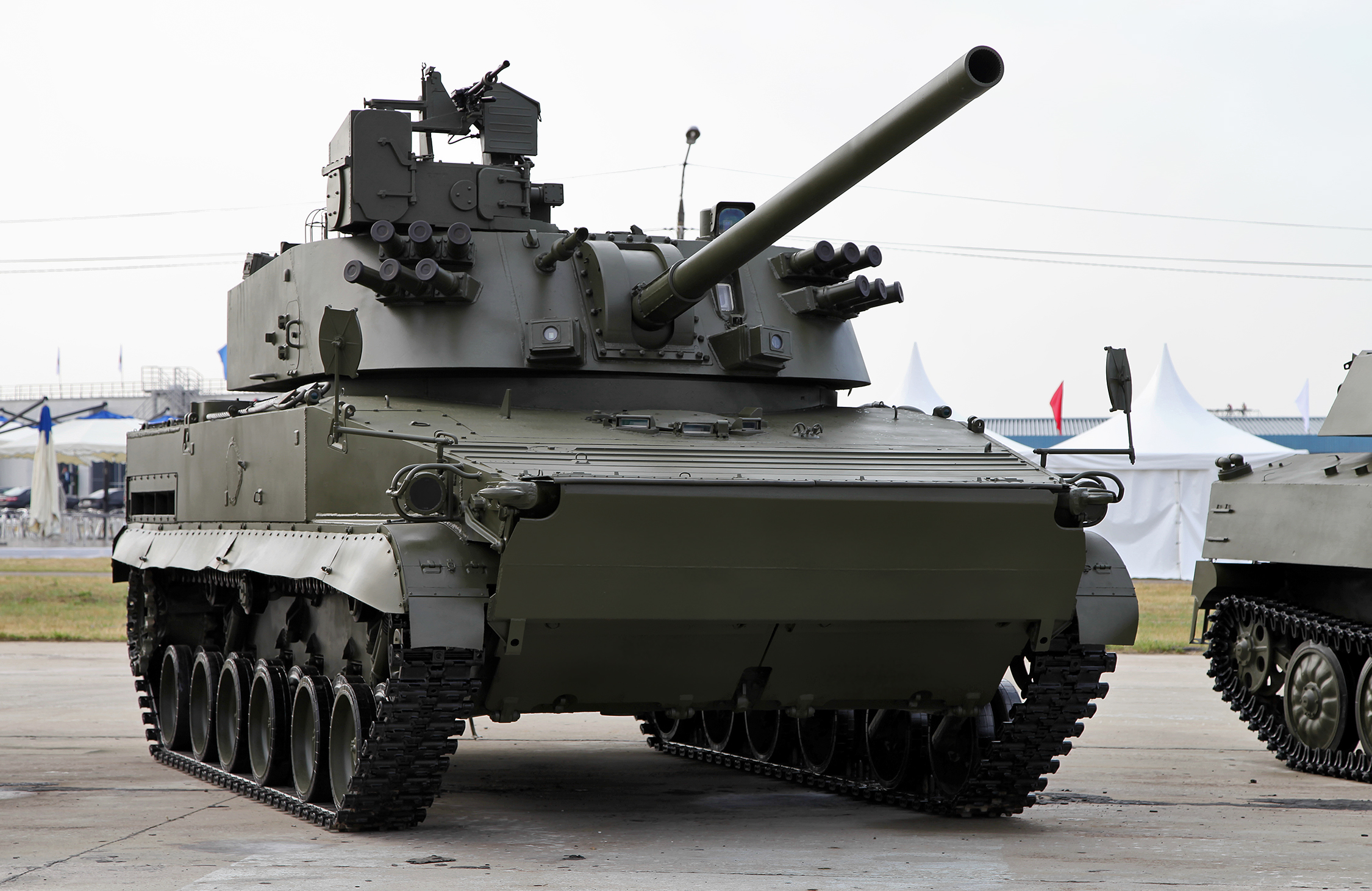
FSCV 2S31 Vena, armed with a 120 mm 2A80 mortar for direct and indirect fire

Fire Support Combat Vehicle (FSCV) is a type of armored combat vehicle (AFV) intended for fire support with armored units, such as supporting tanks in urban combat where they are vulnerable. They are designed to combat various types of threats to tanks on the battlefield, such as traditional anti-tank weapons, infantry with portable anti-tank launchers, snipers, attack helicopters and anti-tank helicopters, and other armored vehicles, mainly lightly armored, etc. Some vehicles are armed with autocannons and missile systems, while others are armed with mortars capable of direct fire, equipped with various ammunition types, such as terminal phase-guided munitions. Tasks may include indirect fire to flush out enemies, or the ability for armor units to fire up into tall buildings when tanks below lack the elevation to cover themselves from threats above, etc.

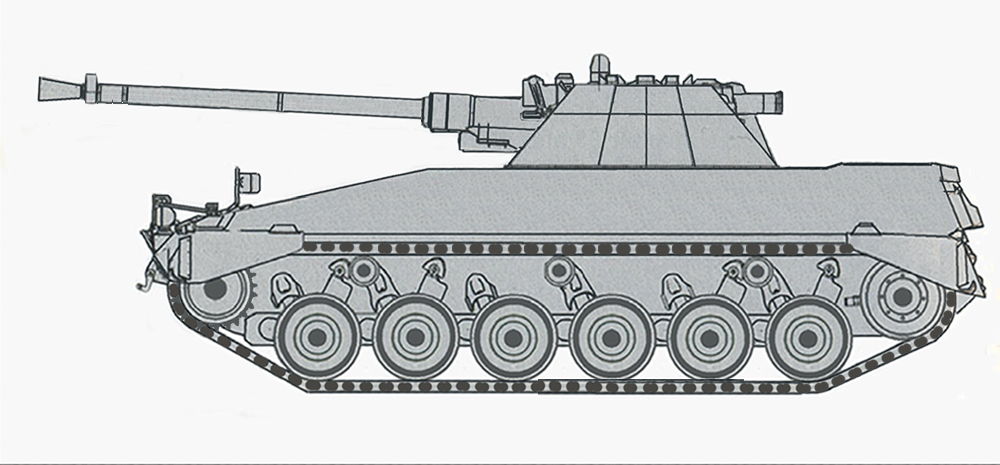
Begleitpanzer 57 AIFSV

It is unclear when the concept first arose and to what degree. Fire support AFV:s for tank units has been a largely untested concept. Even though self-propelled mortars has been used since before World War II, such have been lightly- or unprotected, and lacked the ability for direct fire. An early concept is the West German Begleitpanzer 57 AIFSV ("armored infantry fire support vehicle"), or "Combat Support Tank" (Kampfunterstützungspanzer) in German. It was a Marder infantry fighting vehicle derivative, fitting a new larger turret with a Bofors 57/70 autocannon and a TOW-launcher, at the expense of most of its infantry compartment. A prototype was built in 1977 but never went anywhere. The Soviet Union started experimenting with main battle tank derivatives in the 1980s, fitting such with 30 mm autocannons instead of large caliber guns. One of the first concepts trialing the autocannon concept was the Object 781. The project ultimately lead to the BMPT Terminator, featuring twin 30 mm autocannons and 4x anti-tank guided missile (ATGM) launchers. Russia calls FSCV:s with the autocannon-missile solution as "tank support combat vehicles" (Russian: боевая машина поддержки танков, boyevaya mashina podderzhki tankov, БМПТ, BMPT). The BMPT Terminator made its combat debut on May 18, 2022, when it was deployed in the Russian Invasion of Ukraine on the Russian side.

== Fire Support Combat Vehicle ==
Note that nations have separate requirements and definitions for what makes up an FSCV.

- Algeria – BMPT-62
- China – QN-506
- Finland – 120 KrhPsAjon XA361 (AMOS)
- Germany – Begleitpanzer 57 AIFSV (Note: Designated Kampfunterstützungspanzer, "Combat Support Tank")
- Russia – 2S9 Nona-S
- Russia – 2S31 Vena
- Russia – BMPT Terminator
- Russia – Object 781
- Sweden – grkpbv 90120 (SSG120)
- Turkey/Indonesia – Kaplan FSRV
