= 2S31 Vena =

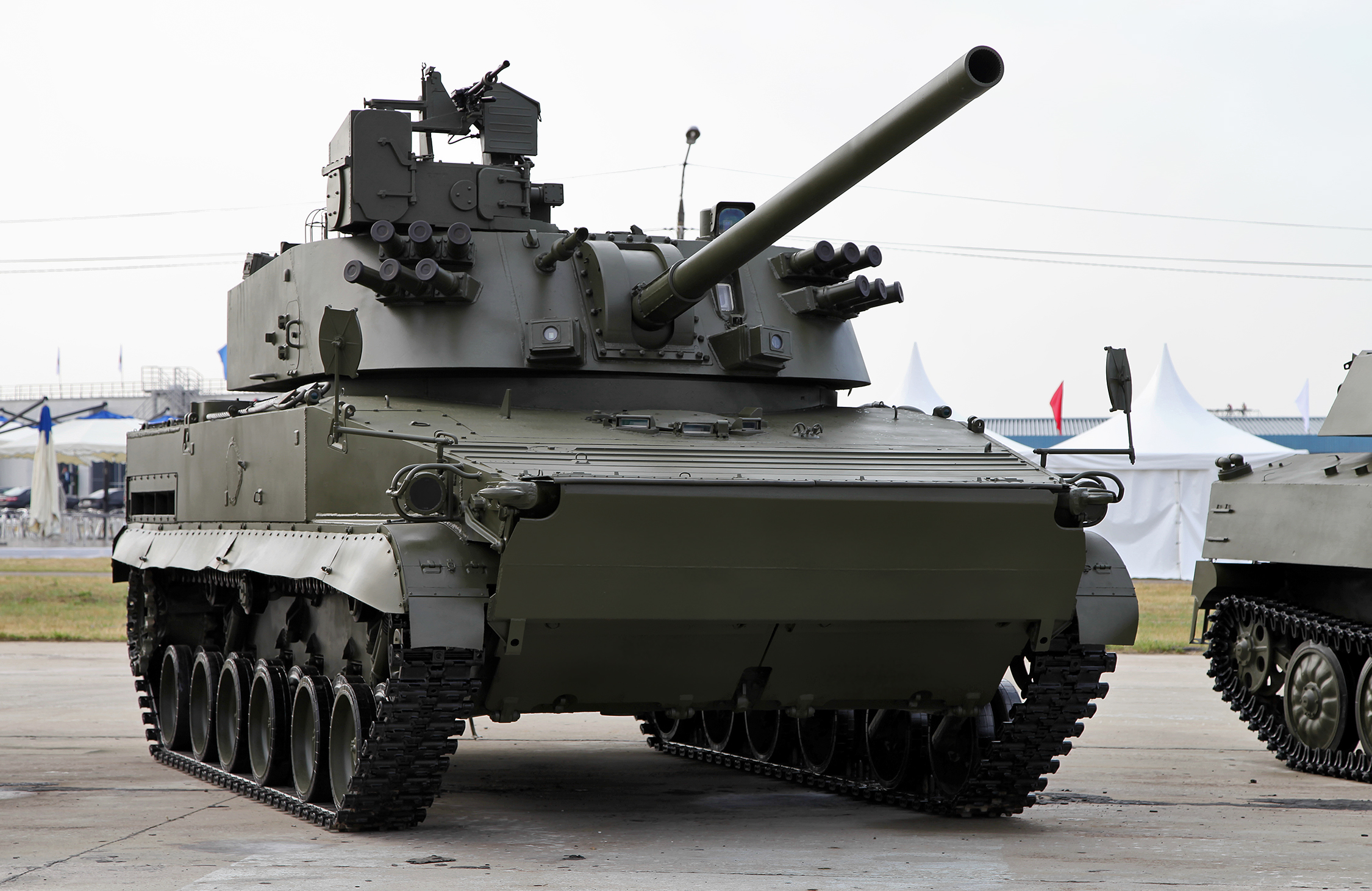
- Type: Fire Support Combat Vehicle (self-propelled mortar)
- Place of origin: Russia

Service history
- In service: 2014–present

Production history
- Designer: Motovilikha Plants
- Designed: 1980–2007
- Manufacturer: Motovilikha Plants
- Produced: 1996

Specifications
- Mass: 19.1 t (18.8 long tons; 21.1 short tons)
- Length: 7 m (23 ft)
- Width: 3 m (9.8 ft)
- Height: 3 m (9.8 ft)
- Crew: 4
- Elevation: -4° to +80°
- Traverse: 360°
- Rate of fire: 8-10 rounds per minute
- Maximum firing range: 7.2–13 km (4.5–8.1 mi)
- Main armament: 2A80 120 mm mortar
- Secondary armament: 7.62 mm PKTM machine gun
- Engine: Diesel UTD-29; 340 kW (460 hp)
- Power/weight: 19.4 kW (26.0 hp) per ton
- Suspension: Individual torsion bar
- Operational range: 600 km (370 mi)
- Maximum speed: 70 km/h (43 mph)

The 2S31 Vena (Russian: "2С31 Вена") is a Russian amphibious self-propelled 120 mm mortar system. "2S31" is its GRAU designation.

== Description ==
The 2S31 consists of a 120mm 2A80 rifled gun-mortar mounted on the chassis of the BMP-3 infantry combat vehicle. It was developed by Joint Stock Venture "Plants of Motovilikha" (Russian: ОАО "Мотовилихинские заводы"). The 2S31's turret is equipped with digital automated fire control system, navigation system, and optical/electronic reconnaissance and target acquisition system. Its 2A80 gun-mortar is capable of launching a high-explosive mortar projectile with a maximum range of 18,000 m (20,000 yd). The vehicle is protected by a welded aluminium hull to protect against small arms fire and shrapnel. It can also fire armour-piercing projectiles that can penetrate up to 650 mm (26 in) of steel plate at ranges of up to 1 km (0.62 mi). A separate sighting system is used when engaging in direct fire mode.

== Service history ==
Reportedly first combat use of Vena was during Second Nagorno-Karabakh War.

In September 2023, Vena appeared in Vesti program during the report about Russian troops fighting near Bakhmut, confirming its use during the Russian invasion of Ukraine.

== Current operators ==
- Azerbaijan
- Russia

== See also ==
- 2S9 Nona
