= Borivske, Kharkiv Oblast =

Rural settlement in Kharkiv Oblast, Ukraine

Borivske Борівське
- Rural settlement
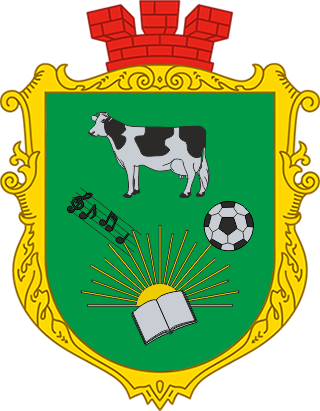
- Coat of arms
- Interactive map of Borivske
- Location in Kharkiv Oblast Location in Ukraine
- Coordinates: 49°38′20″N 37°19′43″E
- Country: Ukraine
- Oblast: Kharkiv Oblast
- Raion: Kupiansk Raion
- Elevation: 179 m (587 ft)

Population (2024)
  - Total: 430
- Time zone: UTC+2 (CET)
  - Summer (DST): UTC+3 (CEST)
- Postal code: 63661
- Area code: +380 5751

Borivske (Ukrainian: Борівське) is a rural settlement in Kupiansk Raion, Kharkiv Oblast, Ukraine. It forms part of Shevchenkove settlement hromada, one of the hromadas of Ukraine.

== History ==
Borivske was established in 1920 under the name Stepovyi. In 1940, the settlement received its current name.

Until 18 July 2020, Borivske was located in Shevchenkove Raion. The raion was abolished in July 2020 as part of the administrative reform of Ukraine, which reduced the number of raions of Kharkiv Oblast to seven, and the area of Shevchenkove Raion was merged into Kupiansk Raion.
