= Metolchyne =

Urban locality in Luhansk Oblast, Ukraine

Metolchyne Метьолчине
- Rural settlement
- Location within Luhansk Oblast Location within Ukraine
- Coordinates: 48°55′47″N 38°32′59″E
- Country: Ukraine
- Oblast: Luhansk Oblast
- Raion: Sievierodonetsk Raion
- Hromada: Sievierodonetsk urban hromada
- Founded: 1820
- Elevation: 73 m (240 ft)

Population (2022)
  - Total: 788
- Time zone: UTC+2 (EET)
  - Summer (DST): UTC+3 (EEST)
- Postal code: 93491
- Area code: +380 6452

Metolchyne (Ukrainian: Метьолчине), formerly Metolkine (Метьолкіне), is a rural settlement in the Sievierodonetsk urban hromada, Sievierodonetsk Raion of Luhansk Oblast of eastern Ukraine. Population: 788 (2022 estimate)

During the battle of Donbas (2022), Metolkine was taken over by Russian and separatist forces.

On 18 June 2025, the Verkhovna Rada renamed the village to Metolchyne to match Ukrainian language standards.

== Demographics ==
Native language distribution as of the Ukrainian Census of 2001:

- Ukrainian: 79.47%
- Russian: 19.43%
