= Syrotyne, Sievierodonetsk Raion, Luhansk Oblast =

Urban locality in Luhansk Oblast, Ukraine

Syrotyne Сиротине
- Rural settlement
- Location of Syrotyne within Luhansk Oblast#Location of Syrotyne within Ukraine Syrotyne (Ukraine)
- Coordinates: 48°54′56″N 38°30′50″E
- Country: Ukraine
- Oblast: Luhansk Oblast
- District: Sievierodonetsk Raion
- Founded: 1684
- Elevation: 50 m (160 ft)

Population (2022)
  - Total: 1,520
- Time zone: UTC+2 (EET)
  - Summer (DST): UTC+3 (EEST)
- Postal code: 93490
- Area code: +380 6452

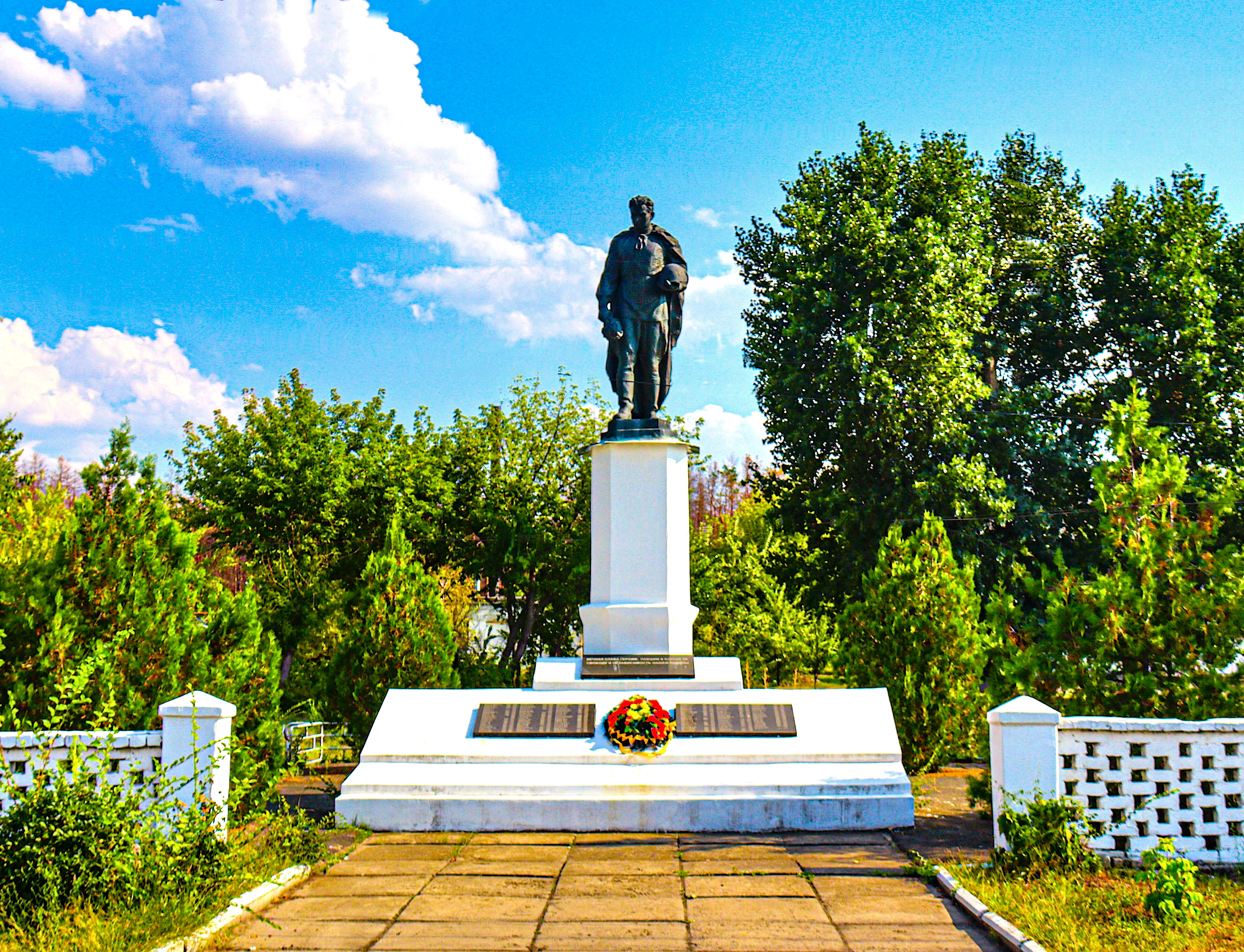
Mass grave of Soviet soldiers, Syrotyne village, Shkilna (Komsomolskaya) st., near the village council

Syrotyne (Ukrainian: Сиротине) is a rural settlement in Sievierodonetsk Raion (district) in Luhansk Oblast of eastern Ukraine. Population: 1,520 (2022 estimate)

Until 18 July 2020, Syrotyne was located in Sievierodonetsk Municipality. The municipality was abolished in July 2020 as part of the administrative reform of Ukraine and the number of raions of Luhansk Oblast was reduced to eight, of which only four were controlled by the government. Sievierodonetsk Municipality was merged into Sievierodonetsk Raion.

== Demographics ==
Native language distribution as of the Ukrainian Census of 2001:

- Ukrainian: 71.34%
- Russian: 28.26%
- Others: 0.08%
