= Republic of Stakhanov =

Separatist republic in Ukraine, 2014–2015

Cossack People's Republic of Stakhanov Стахановская казацкая народная республика (Russian) Стаханівська козацька народна республіка (Ukrainian)
- 2014–2015
- Flag

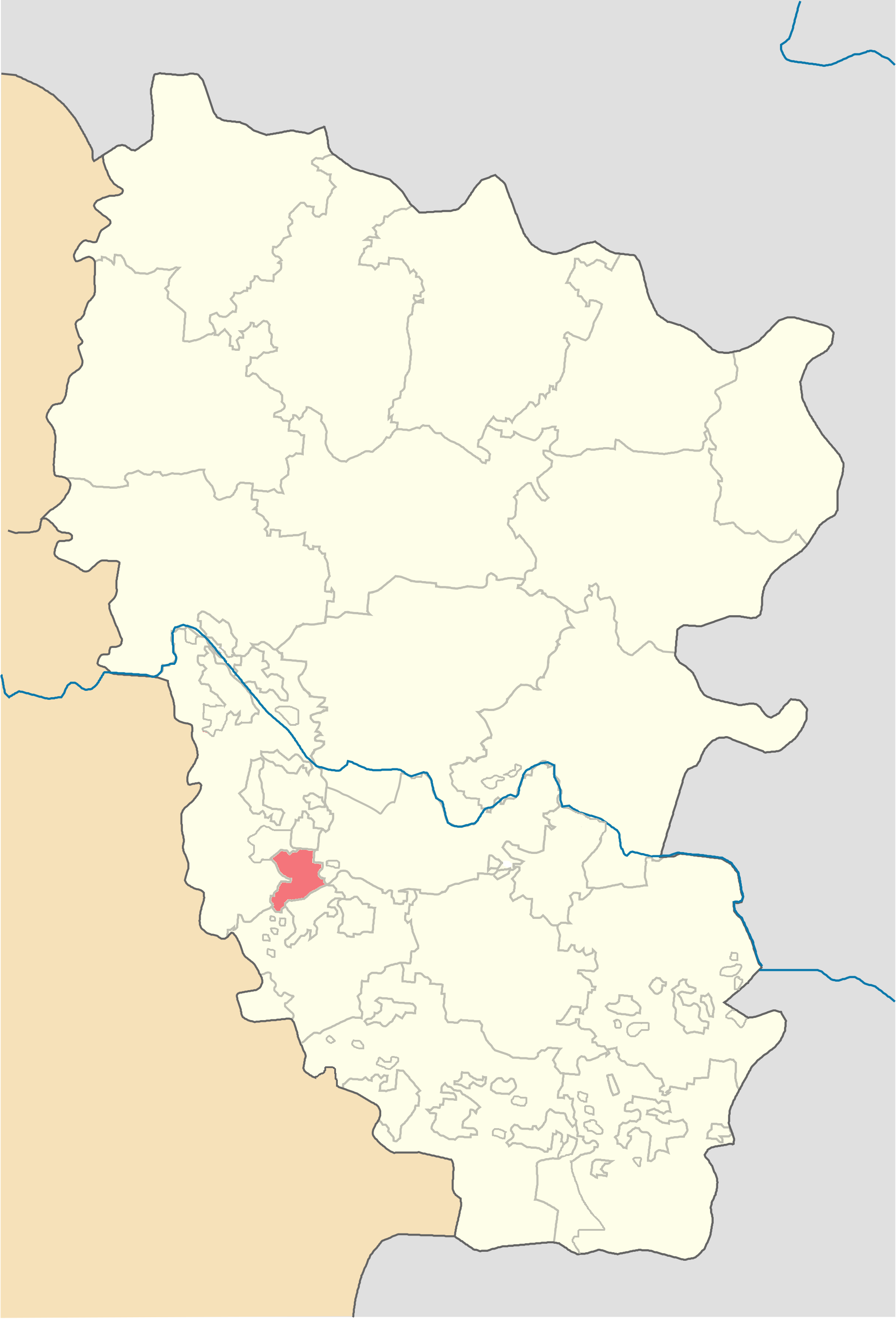
- Kadiivka in red within the Luhansk Oblast.
- Status: Disbanded
- Capital: Stakhanov
- Common languages: Russian
- Religion: Orthodox Christianity
- Government: Republic
- Ataman
  - 2014–2015: Pavel Dryomov
- History
  - Declared: 14 September 2014
  - Disbanded: 12 December 2015
- Currency: Ruble
- Website: https://vk.com/kazak_nac_guard; http://казакнацгвард.рф/
| Preceded by | Succeeded by |
| Ukraine | Luhansk People's Republic |

The Cossack People's Republic of Stakhanov was a separatist quasi-state republic of Pavel Dryomov on the territory of the city of Stakhanov (now Kadiivka) within the separatist Luhansk People's Republic.

Before the war Dryomov was a bricklayer in Stakhanov. At the beginning of the conflict in Eastern Ukraine, Dryomov offered Stakhanov citizens an alternate vision to that of the LPR - a new, socialist neo-Soviet, "Cossack" republic "that works for the poor and elderly". In 2014 Dryomov was called the "savior of Stakhanov" by the British journalist Oliver Carroll who wrote an article about him in Politico magazine. According to Carroll, one of the main points of departure between The Republic of Stakhanov and the Luhansk People's Republic was whether to adhere to the Minsk Protocol ceasefire deal with Ukraine. Dryomov advocated continuing the war in Donbas. During a speech, he advocated his views and stated "We've had enough corruption and slavery here for a century! We're not fools—neither Poroshenko nor Putin are interested in an honest country!" Nothing would be allowed to get in the way of destiny, he declared: "We will build a Cossack republic right here in Stakhanov!"

According to some sources, on 14 September 2014, Don Cossacks in Stakhanov proclaimed the Republic of Stakhanov, with the city serving as the administrative centre and its 60,000 people. They claimed that a "Cossack government" now ruled in Stakhanov. However, the following day, this was claimed to be a fabrication, and an unnamed Don Cossack leader stated the 14 September meeting had, in fact, resulted in 12,000 Cossacks volunteering to join the LPR forces.

== Dissolution ==
Pavel Dryomov died on 12 December 2015 when his car was blown up while he was traveling the day after his wedding.

== See also ==
- Luhansk People's Republic
- Donetsk People's Republic
- National Council of Bessarabia
- 2014 Donbas status referendums
- 2014 pro-Russian unrest in Ukraine
- List of rebel groups that control territory
- List of designated terrorist groups
- List of active separatist movements in Europe
- Novorossiya (confederation)
- Cossackia
