= Borivske, Luhansk Oblast =

Urban locality in Luhansk Oblast, Ukraine

Borivske Борівське
- Rural settlement
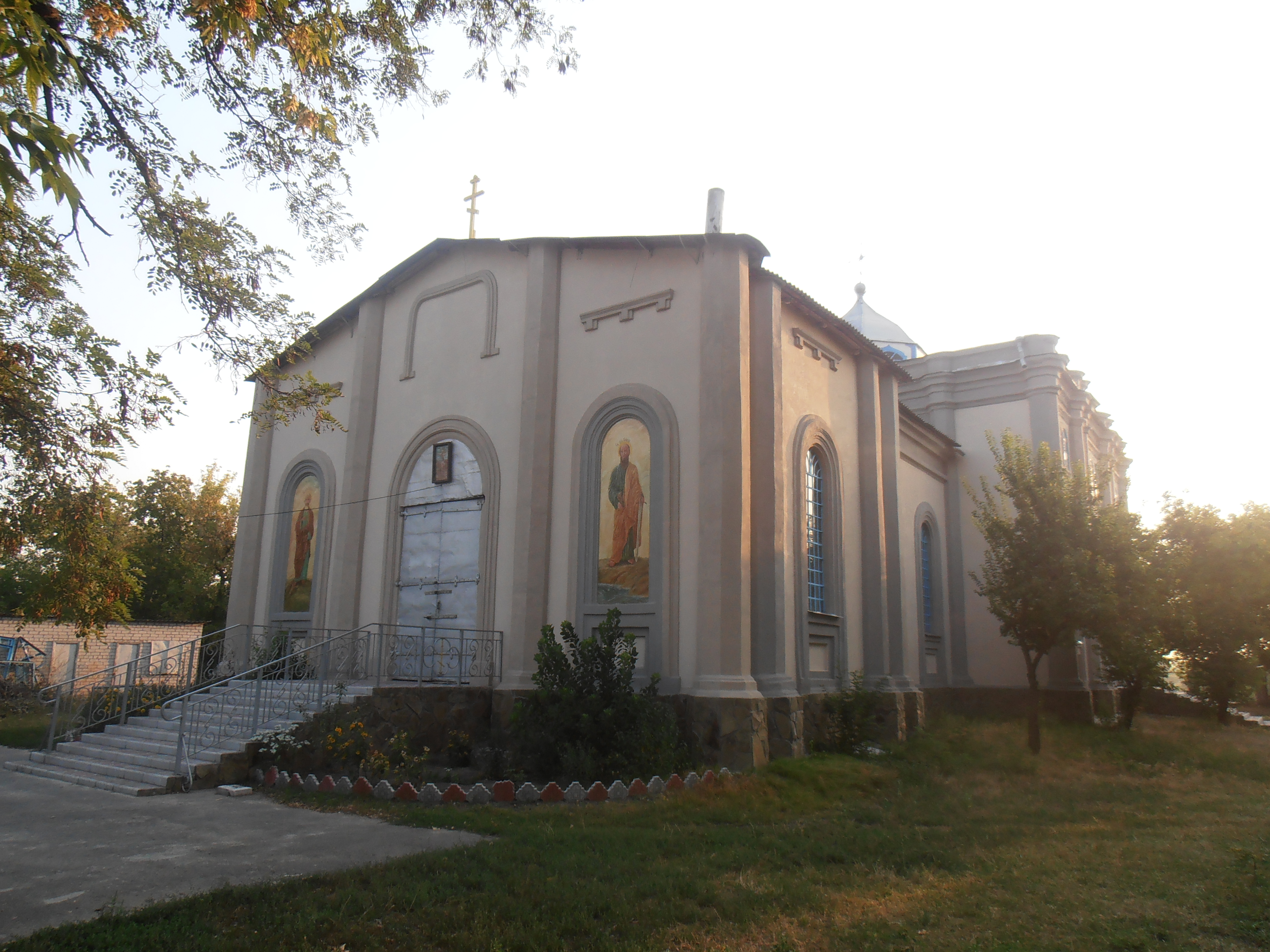

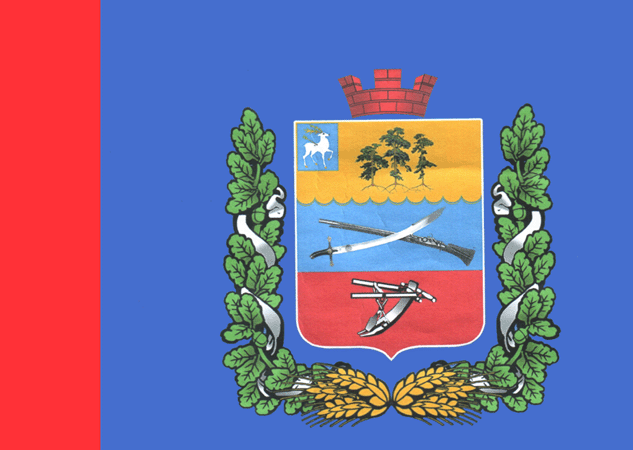
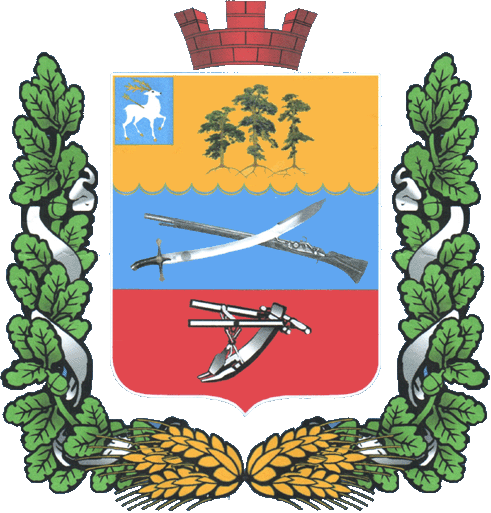
- Flag Seal
- Interactive map of Borivske
- Location of Borivske within Luhansk Oblast#Location of Borivske within Ukraine Borivske (Ukraine)
- Coordinates: 48°52′04″N 38°33′59″E
- Country: Ukraine
- Oblast: Luhansk Oblast
- District: Sievierodonetsk Raion
- Founded: 1640
- Elevation: 52 m (171 ft)

Population (2022)
  - Total: 5,640
- Time zone: UTC+2 (EET)
  - Summer (DST): UTC+3 (EEST)
- Postal code: 93493
- Area code: +380 6452

Borivske (Ukrainian: Борівське) is a rural settlement in Sievierodonetsk Raion (district) in Luhansk Oblast of eastern Ukraine, about 64 kilometres (40 mi) NWbW of the centre of Luhansk city. Population: 5,640 (2022 estimate)

Until 18 July 2020, Borivske was located in Sievierodonetsk Municipality. The municipality was abolished that day as part of the administrative reform of Ukraine and the number of raions of Luhansk Oblast was reduced to eight, of which only four were controlled by the government. Sievierodonetsk Municipality was merged into Sievierodonetsk Raion. Since 25 June 2022, Borivske is occupied by Russian regular and proxy forces.

== Demographics ==
Native language distribution as of the Ukrainian Census of 2001:

- Russian: 94.67%
- Ukrainian: 5.16%
- Others: 0.03%
