= Tsunami Regiment (Ukraine) =

Ukrainian governmental assault police unit

- Ukrainian: Штурмовий полк «Цунамі»
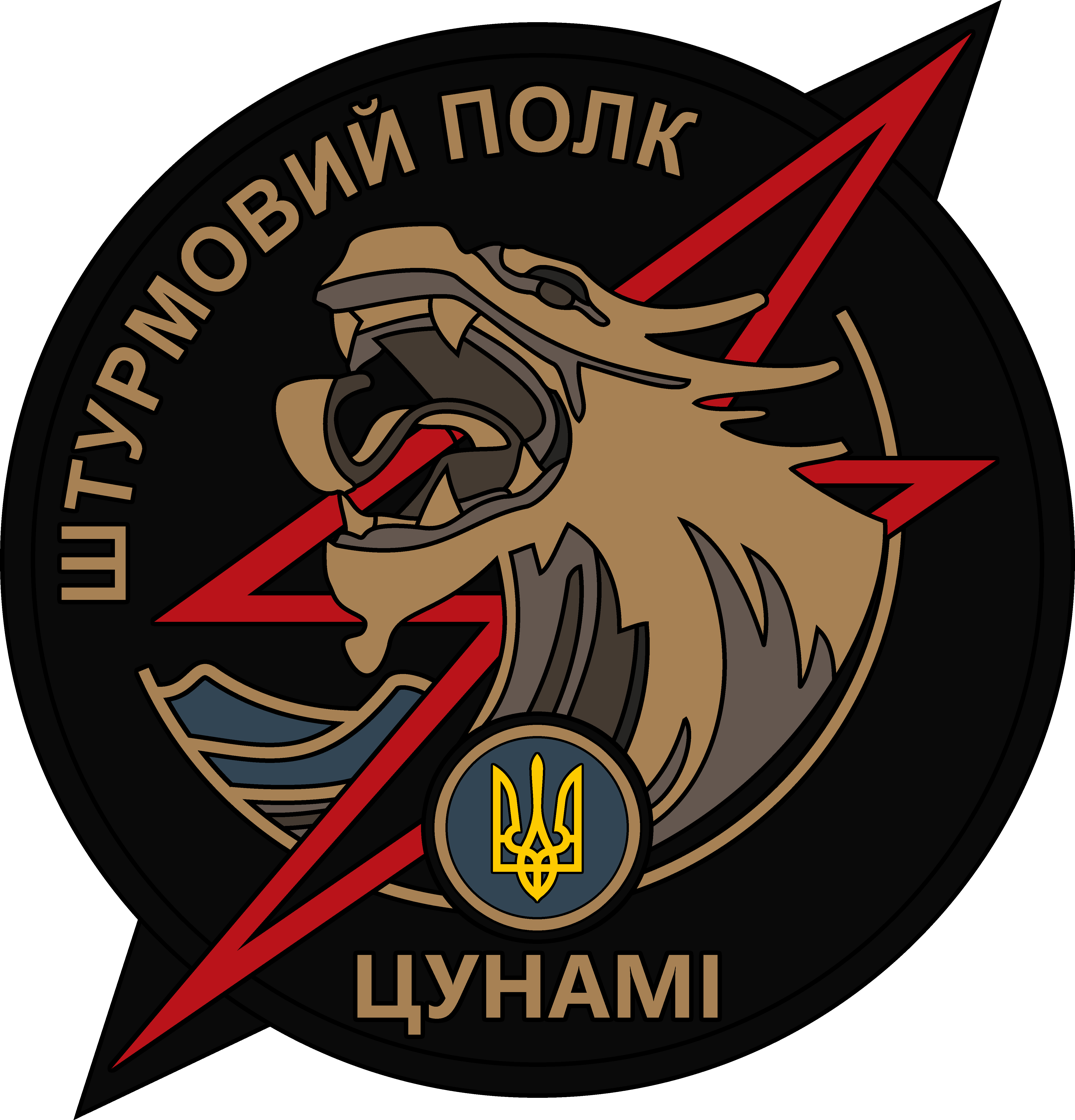
- Tsunami Regiment Insignia
- Active: 2022–present
- Country: Ukraine
- Branch: Ministry of Internal Affairs
- Type: Special Tasks Patrol Police
- Role: #Tasks
- Part of: Liut Brigade
- Garrison/HQ: Odesa
- Engagements: Russo-Ukrainian War; Russian invasion of Ukraine; Southern Ukraine campaign; Odesa strikes (2022-present); 15 March 2024 Odesa missile strikes; 2022 Kherson counteroffensive; Eastern Ukraine campaign; Battle of Bakhmut; 2024 Kharkiv offensive; Battle of Vovchansk

Commanders
- Notable commanders: Lieutenant Colonel Oleksandr Evgeniyovich Hostishchev †

Insignia
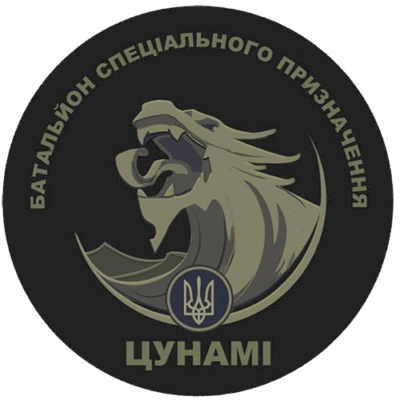
- Former Insignia

The 2nd Special Purpose "Tsunami" Assault Police Regiment is a regiment of the Liut Brigade of the Special Tasks Patrol Police subordinated to Ministry of Internal Affairs of Ukraine. The regiment is based in Odesa. It was established in 2022 in the wake of the Russian invasion of Ukraine and has, since then seen regular combat on the frontlines.

== History ==
At the beginning of the Russian invasion of Ukraine, in Odesa, the National Police of Ukraine established the Tsunami Battalion. The Battalion took part in the Battle of Odesa and then went to the frontlines in the Kherson Oblast. When the Armed Forces of Ukraine advanced, the Tsunami Battalion followed them and consolidated control over territory by conducting clearance operations. Their task was to identify collaborators, saboteurs, and Russian soldiers who failed to retreat. The police collaborating with civilians, and located the Russian military positions and investigated Russian war crimes. They also provide local residents with communication, medicine and humanitarian aid, gathering the locals and establishing Starlink connections in the liberated settlements. From 18 April 2022 to 5 February 2023, the combat operations during the Southern Ukraine campaign especially in Mykolaiv Oblast and Kherson Oblast. During April-June 2022, the battalion organized and took part in 22 operational-combat missions of counter-subversive struggle to detect enemy subversive-reconnaissance groups and their alleged aids in the Odesa Oblast capturing weapons caches, ammunition, communication and other equipment, clearance operations were carried out aimed at identifying collaborators who spread anti-Ukrainian content on social networks, with the aim of escalating the conflict situation in the region, inciting inter-national and inter-ethnic enmity and justifying the Russian invasion of Ukraine. On 17 July 2022, during the 2022 Kherson counteroffensive, the battalion captured the positions in Lozove, enabling the Armed Forces of Ukraine to advance during the counteroffensive. From 3 September 2022 to 10 November 2022, the Tsunami Battalion conducted assault operations in Mykolaiv Oblast and Kherson Oblast, in addition to counter-sabotage, search and clearance operations in 10 settlements including Lozove, Bilohirka and Blagodativka.

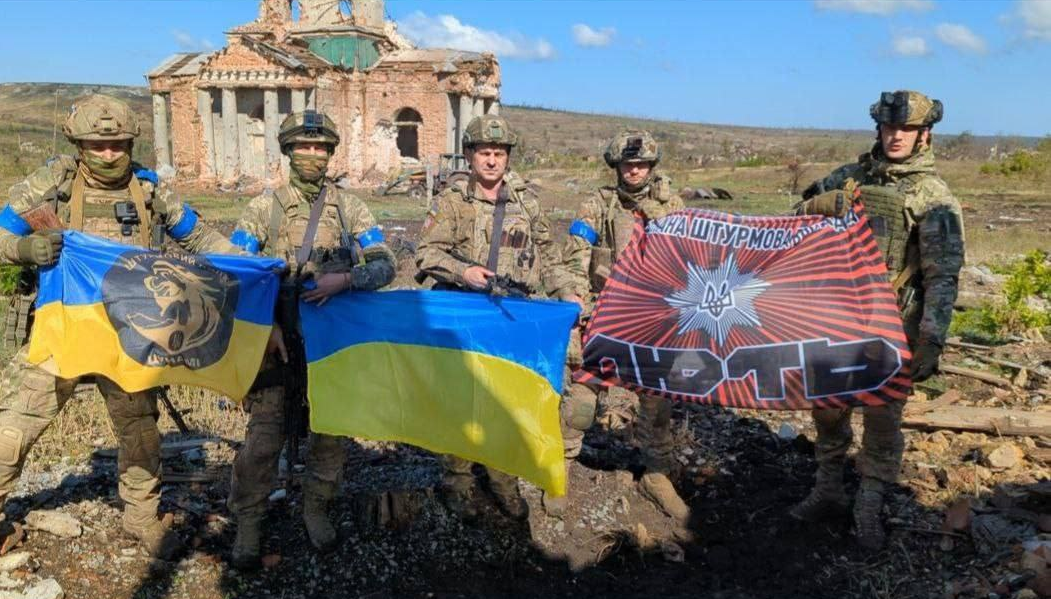
The regiment personnel operating Klishtiivka

On February 6, 2023, the consolidated special purpose battalion was reorganized into the 2nd Special Purpose Offensive "Tsunami" Police Regiment and became a part of the Liut Brigade. After training and combat coordination, the regiment took part in the Battle of Bakhmut, taking part in combat operations in Klishchiivka. In the Donetsk Oblast, the regiment defeated the elite forces of the Russian Armed Forces in a close-range combat. In July 2023, an armored vehicle was destroyed and 15 paratroopers of the 83rd Guards Air Assault Brigade of the Russian Army were killed by the regiment. On 26 July 2023, some Russian attack aircraft were also destroyed by the regiment. In the spring of 2023, the "Tavr" assault battalion became a part of the regiment.

On 3 February 2024, the regiment conducted artillery strikes against Russian forces in Donetsk Oblast. The regiment's commander, Lieutenant Colonel Oleksandr Evgeniyovich Hostishchev was killed in 15 March 2024 Odesa missile strikes along with two other personnel Sergiy Tetyukhin and Andriy Boyarsky. In May 2024, the regiment, together with the Armed Forces of Ukraine, took part in the 2024 Kharkiv offensive especially in the Battle of Vovchansk, during which on 22 May 2024, a serviceman of the regiment, Shablyko Serhii Gennadiyovych, was killed in action.

== Structure ==
- 1st Assault Battalion
- 2nd Assault Battalion
- 3rd Assault Battalion
- Tavr Battalion

== Tasks ==
- Offensive Assault
- Countersabotage
- Counterterrorism
- Clearance operations
- Reconnaissance

== Commanders ==
- Lieutenant Colonel Oleksandr Evgeniyovich †(2022-2024)
