= Kremenchuk Company (Ukraine) =

- Ukrainian: Рота поліції Кременчук
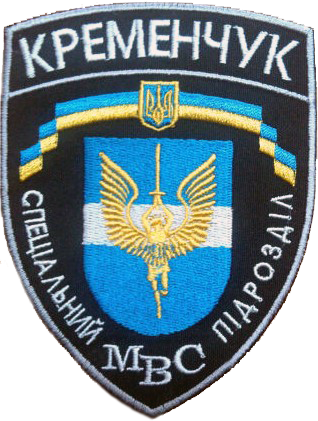
- Kremenchuk Company Insignia
- Active: 2014–present
- Country: Ukraine
- Branch: Ministry of Internal Affairs
- Type: Special Tasks Patrol Police
- Part of: Poltava Battalion
- Garrison/HQ: Kremenchuk
- Engagements: Russo-Ukrainian War: War in Donbass; 2022 Russian invasion of Ukraine

The Kremenchuk Company is a company of the Special Tasks Patrol Police subordinated to Ministry of Internal Affairs of Ukraine. The company is based in Kremenchuk. It was established in 2014 in the wake of the War in Donbass and has, since then seen regular combat on the frontlines.

== History ==
On 14 April 2014, Arsen Avakov, signed an order for the creation of regional police tactical units in Ukraine. The "Kremenchuk" was established as a platoon, and then became the "Kremenchuk" company, financed by the enterprises in Kremenchuk.

Special unit "Kremenchuk" is equipped with everything necessary. In this regard, the company differs from some other volunteer units that participate in ATO. This became possible thanks to the help of Kremenchuk enterprises.

Oleh Berkelyu was appointed as its Commander. On 5 May 2014, 62 applications from city volunteers were submitted to the company of which 20 volunteers were accepted and trained on 13 May 2014 and 25 more passed the medical examination. On 17 June 2014, Komroty Berkel announced the increase in the number of personnel to 150 and about the plan to expand the company to a Battalion, however the plan was scrapped in September 2014. At the beginning of June 2014, the company was fully staffed and its personnel passed a one-month basic training course, which included tactical and special fire training. The company began its activities in Kremenchuk conducting patrolling in the center and the "mountainous part". On 10 July 2014, the company's personnel in body armor and with weapons went to the ATO zone.

Why should I be afraid? Let them fear me! I don't want them [separatists] to come here, to knock on the door, for people to be afraid, for my family to be afraid. I am not coming with weapons, they came to me with weapons.

The "Kremenchuk" company was deployed to Krymske, Luhansk Oblast where they started operating against separatist forces. It also saw combat in Slovianoserbsk where on 13 August 2014, separatists attacked a checkpoint of the company wounding one of its personnel. At the beginning of September 2014, the company received the task to blow up a pontoon bridge across the Donets, while traveling to the bridge, a battle started between the company and separatists, during which commander, Oleg Berkelya and a soldier, Artem Kravchenko were wounded, the bridge was successfully destroyed. On 23 September 2014, the company engaged in a battle with a Separatist sabotage group that was trying to cross the Donets near Trokhizbenka inflicting casualties on Separatists. In October 2014, Kremenchuk company in coordination with the Zoloti Vorota Battalion "discovered, located and pushed out a reconnaissance and sabotage group" of the Russian Armed Forces. On 18 November 2014, a part of the Kremenchuk Special Purpose Militia Company returned home and reported about the situation that the "Kremenchuk" company was under constant artillery fire, but did not suffer fatalities.

We do our work. Our Ukrainian troops are stationed in Krymskye, and the separatists are further away in Bakhmut. They fire at us with "Grads" and mortars. We hold back the onslaught thanks to the patriotism of our soldiers. We are Ukrainians, and this is our land.

Another detachment the company was then deployed to Mariupol. The Volkswagen Transporters of the company were converted into combat vehicles and the company's personnel were awarded certificates of honor. In September 2014, it became the 3rd company of the Poltava Battalion.

== Sources ==
- Рота «Кременчук» вирушила в зону АТО on YouTube
- Захарченко про службу кременчуцьких силовиків в АТО on YouTube
- Бійці спецроти «Кременчук» повернулися додому з АТО on YouTube
