= Vinnytsia Rifle Battalion (Ukraine) =

- Ukrainian: Вінницький стрілецький батальйон
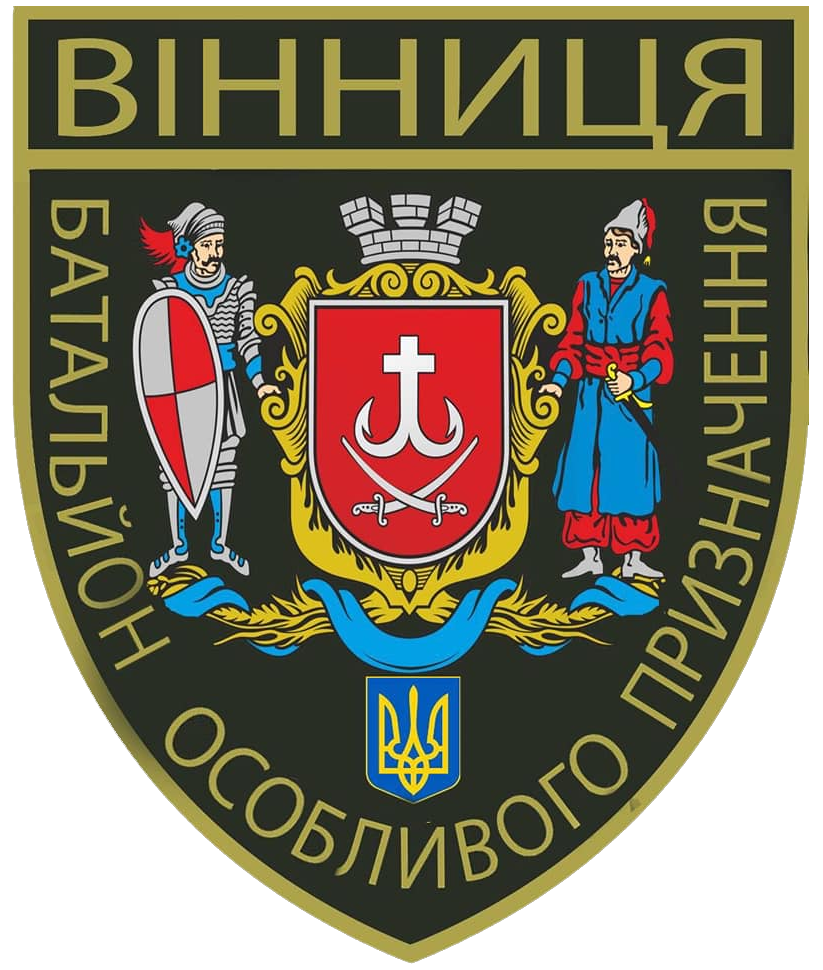
- Vinnytsia Rifle Battalion Insignia
- Active: 2014–present
- Country: Ukraine
- Branch: Ministry of Internal Affairs
- Type: Special Tasks Patrol Police
- Garrison/HQ: Vinnytsia
- Engagements: Russo-Ukrainian War: War in Donbass; 2022 Russian invasion of Ukraine; Eastern Ukraine campaign; 2022 Kharkiv counteroffensive; Battle of Bakhmut

The Vinnytsia Battalion is a rifle battalion of the Special Tasks Patrol Police subordinated to Ministry of Internal Affairs of Ukraine. The battalion is based in Vinnytsia. It was established in 2014 in the wake of the War in Donbass and has, since then seen regular combat on the frontlines.

== History ==
On 16 April 2014, the Vinnytsia Battalion was established in order to protect the rights and freedoms of citizens, protect society from criminal organizations and protect public order in ATO zone as well as in Vinnytsia Oblast. On 24 July 2014, 100 soldiers of the battalion went to the ATO zone. In September 2014, fifty more soldiers of the "Vinnytsia" battalion went to the ATO zone. On 17 January 2016, soldiers of the 20th consolidated detachment and 50 soldiers of the Vinnytsia special patrol service battalion, who served in the ATO zone for a month, met in Vinnytsia. The "Vinnytsia" battalion was recognized by the community of Popasna as the best unit among law enforcement agencies as the battalion was the only unit who during the shelling of the city provided assistance to the residents, operated ambulances and worked as firemen, and evacuated civilians during the nine days of shelling saving the lives of 450 residents of Troitske. On 16 April 2016, soldiers of the "Vinnytsia" went to the ATO zone and returned on 8 August 2016. Again they continued to operate in the ATO zone throughout 2021. Following the Russian invasion of Ukraine on 24 February 2022, the battalion continued to perform operations during the Eastern Ukraine campaign. In December 2022, the battalion's positions were hit during the Battle of Bakhmut, a soldier of the Battalion (Andriy Svirin) was severely wounded as a result of the strikes. The Battalion also operated in Terny and then in Serebryansk Forest. On 5 May 2024, the battalion was merged with Special Purpose Police Company of Vinnytsya Oblast and it became the Vinnytsia Rifle Battalion. It underwent extensive training in July 2024. On 18 September 2024, nine Renault SUVs were purchased for the Battalion.

== Commanders ==
- Ruslan Moroz (2014–2016)
- Oleg Honcharuk (2016–2017)
- Gurnyak Ruslan (2017–2024)
- Patsalyuk Bohdan (2024-)
