= Sumy Company (Ukraine) =

- Ukrainian: Рота поліції Суми
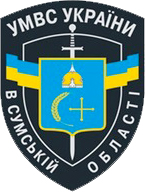
- Sumy Company Insignia
- Active: 2014–present
- Country: Ukraine
- Branch: Ministry of Internal Affairs
- Type: Special Tasks Patrol Police
- Garrison/HQ: Sumy
- Engagements: Russo-Ukrainian War: War in Donbass; Siege of Sloviansk; 2022 Russian invasion of Ukraine; Northern Ukraine campaign; Battle of Sumy

The Sumy Company is a company of the Special Tasks Patrol Police subordinated to Ministry of Internal Affairs of Ukraine. The company is based in Sumy. It was established in 2014 in the wake of the War in Donbass and has, since then seen regular combat on the frontlines.

== History ==
Following the Revolution of Dignity, 30 additional special police units were established amidst the 2014 pro-Russian unrest in Ukraine. On 16 April 2014, it was established as the Sumy Battalion. Its main tasks became the protection of public order in Sumy Oblast as well as in the ATO zone. The Sumy Oblast Council allocated 1 million hryvnias for the purchase of uniforms and shoes, radio communication equipment, body armor and special equipment of the battalion. The battalion's personnel conducted theoretical and practical training including shooting and combat coordination. The first task allocated to the battalion was the neutralization of separatists in Sumy Oblast conducted successfully from 1–9 May 2014. The battalion also continued to operate in the ATO zone through periodic deployments of its detachments for the timespan of one to one and a half months with a week of vacation following the return of personnel after which they'd resume duties in Sumy Oblast. In the second half of May, the first detachment of the battalion took part in the Siege of Sloviansk and took part in the restoration of peace, patrolling the streets, identifying and detaining Separatists.

Someone who has been in battle, like no one else, begins to understand what peace is. When we entered Sloviansk, the city was destroyed. Looting and banditry flourished. Today, local residents support us, because they saw and felt for themselves what those "benefactors" who promised a good life did. And when you compare what happened in Sloviansk and what we see in peaceful Sumy, you understand that you have to do everything to prevent a similar scenario from repeating itself in your hometown.

A soldier of the company (Volkov Ivan Volodymyrovych) died on 1 March 2015.

Following the Russian invasion of Ukraine, it saw combat during the Battle of Sumy.

== Sources ==
External videos
- 1. У зону АТО вирушила чергова зміна батальйону «Суми»

- В Україні створено 30 спецпідрозділів особливого призначення, — Арсен Аваков;
- Спецпідрозділ «Суми» на варті громадського спокою, — МВС
