= Chernihiv Rifle Battalion (Ukraine) =

- Ukrainian: Чернігівський стрілецький батальйон
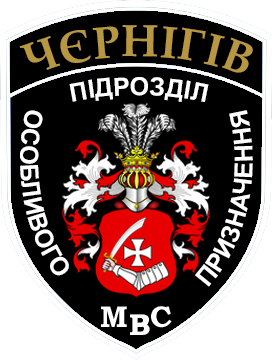
- Chernihiv Rifle Battalion Insignia
- Active: 2014–present
- Country: Ukraine
- Branch: Ministry of Internal Affairs
- Type: Special Tasks Patrol Police
- Garrison/HQ: Chernihiv
- Engagements: Russo-Ukrainian War; War in Donbass; Battle of Kreminna; Battles of Sievierodonetsk; Battle of Rubizhne; Battle of Lysychansk; Battle at the Border; 2022 Russian invasion of Ukraine; Northern Ukraine campaign; Siege of Chernihiv; Eastern Ukraine campaign; Battle of Soledar; Battle of Bakhmut

Commanders
- Current commander: Viktor Trishchuk

The Chernihiv Battalion is a rifle battalion of the Special Tasks Patrol Police subordinated to Ministry of Internal Affairs of Ukraine. The regiment is based in Chernihiv. It was established in 2014 in the wake of the War in Donbass and has, since then seen regular combat on the frontlines.

== History ==
It was established on 16 April 2014, following the Revolution of Dignity and was one of the first units of its kind in Ukraine to curb the 2014 pro-Russian unrest in Ukraine. The backbone of the battalion composed of the 14th "Free People" which took part in Euromaidan and was led by Roman Pytskiv. The battalion's main tasks included protection of public order and peace in Chernihiv as well as ensuring peace in the areas facing unrest.

Creating the battalion itself was not easy. I was given the task of gathering people. There was an instruction from Andrii Parubiy to organize people from the Self-Defense Forces, I took guys from the Maidan, those who did not join the National Guard. We arrived in Chernihiv, where we were given an old room and started the training process.

Volunteers provided humanitarian assistance to the personnel of the Chernihiv battalion such as warm winter uniforms and food and Chrysler Voyager and Dodge Caravan minivans for emergency evacuation and countersabotage operations. On 13 May 2014, the first 46 personnel of the battalion took the oath of loyalty and also took up weaponry. They started patrols in Chernihiv Oblast and were soon deployed to the ATO zone. The battalion was deployment to the Luhansk Oblast, first to Kreminna where they performed anti-separatist clearing operations during the Battle of Kreminna, and then entered Rubizhne together with the Armed Forces of Ukraine during the Battle of Rubizhne. Then took part in the operation to relieve the encirclement of besieged Ukrainian forces in Lysychansk during the Battle of Lysychansk and ultimately in the capture of the city. Then they conducted similar clearing operations during the Battles of Sievierodonetsk, in Krasnyi Yar and Vegunka as well as in Vilkhove and Stanytsia Luhanska. In general, in the ATO zone, the battalion conducted clearing operations, repelled attacks by separatists, guarded checkpoints, conducted patrols, performed vehicle control operations and helped during evacuation.

We are following the army and are engaged in clearing dangerous sites. We find those who supported the separatists with money, supplied them with uniforms and products. We found weapons and ammunition in many of the sites. During the period of the existence of the battalion, we handed over more than forty people to the SBU.

On 21 October 2014, the commander of the battalion, Roman, was awarded a nominal weapon; four soldiers were awarded the badge "For bravery in the service", five received official thanks and twenty-two were assigned special ranks. In November–December 2014, fighters of the "Chernihiv" battalion continued to operate in Stanytsia Luhanska and also took part in the Battle of the Border. From 2:55 p.m. to 3:20 p.m. on 16 November 2014,. separatists crossed the Siverskyi Donets River and fired automatic weapons and grenade launchers at a patrol car of the "Chernihiv" battalion and a checkpoint of the Armed Forces of Ukraine near the bus station of Stanytsia Luhanska, the attack resulted in the deaths of three soldiers of the battalion (Oleksandr Viktorovych Naidyon, Zapeka Viktor Oleksandrovych and Ishchenko Andriy Vasyliovych) and wounding of many more including Roman Mykolayovych Los who was so severely wounded that he was sent to Greece for treatment under the NATO program. During an operation at the Athens Hospital on 20 July 2015, he fell into a coma, and in March 2016, was transferred to Kyiv where he died on the morning of 10 June 2016. On 26 November 2014, Stanytsia Luhanska was shelled by BM-21 Grads. On 29 November 2014, after shelling from mortars and rocket artillery, the positions of the battalion were attacked by four separatist tanks but the attack was repulsed by RPGs and artillery strikes. On 18 June 2015, Hennady Moskal appealed to disband the Tornado and Chernihiv battalions due to suspected involvement in criminal activities, especially smuggling. "Tornado" was Disbanded as a separate Battalion and became the 4th Company of Myrotvorets Battalion but "Chernihiv" continued its operations. On 21 December 2015, it was again deployed to the ATO zone. On 15 April 2016, on the eve of its second establishment anniversary, its size was reduced to a company, some of its personnel returned from Donbas after serving in Kurakhove and more personnel prepared to carry out combat missions in Mariupol. On 26 January 2017, the Chernihiv Company was deployed to Mariupol and continued to operate in Mariupol till 2021.

Following the Russian invasion of Ukraine, it took part in the Siege of Chernihiv during which on 28 February 2022, a soldier of the company (Dmytro Muzyryov) was killed while repelling an advancing Russian column and another (Ihor Kushnirenko) was killed on 6 March 2022. The company took part in the Battle of Soledar and the Battle of Bakhmut. During the Battle of Bakhmut, a soldier of the company (Oleksandr Yeschenko) was killed on 13 January 2023 as a result of an artillery strike. In April 2024, the company was reorganized into a Rifle Battalion after the merger of a company of the National Police of Ukraine with "Chernihiv" Company.

== Sources ==
External videos
- 1. 46 перших спецпризначенців батальйону «Чернігів» приймають присягу
- 2. Чернігів-Схід — історія неоголошеної війни
- 3. Батальйон «Чернігів»: втрата трьох
- 4. Батальйон "Чернігів" повернувся на планову ротацію не в повному складі

- Батальйон спецпризначення «Чернігів» у Фейсбуці
- В Україні створено 30 спецпідрозділів особливого призначення, — Арсен Аваков
- Бійці спецбатальйону «Чернігів» отримали високі нагороди МВС (ФОТО), — прес-служба МВС України
- Бійці спецбатальйону «Чернігів» повернулися із зони АТО на короткостроковий відпочинок (ФОТО), — прес-служба МВС України
- Голова Луганської ОДА відзначив мужність та професіоналізм правоохоронців, які загинули під час виконання службових обов'язків у зоні АТО (ФОТО), — прес-служба МВС України
- Дитячий малюнок — талісман захисника вітчизни (ФОТО), — прес-служба МВС України
- Бійці спеціального батальйону міліції «Чернігів» повернулися із зони АТО (ФОТО), — прес-служба МВС України
- Школярі привітали бійців спецбатальйону «Чернігів» зі святом Святого Миколая (ФОТО), — прес-служба МВС України
