= Ternopil Rifle Battalion (Ukraine) =

- Ukrainian: Батальйон міліції Тернопіль
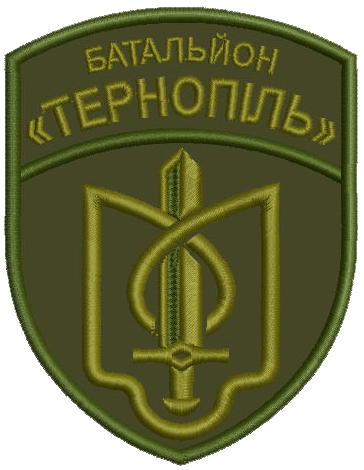
- Ternopil Rifle Battalion Insignia
- Active: 2014–present
- Country: Ukraine
- Branch: Ministry of Internal Affairs
- Type: Special Tasks Patrol Police
- Garrison/HQ: Ternopil
- Engagements: Russo-Ukrainian War; War in Donbass; 2022 Russian invasion of Ukraine; Eastern Ukraine campaign; Battle of Popasna; Battle of Lysychansk; Battle of Bakhmut; Pokrovsk offensive

Commanders
- Current commander: Volodymyr Katruk

The Ternopil Battalion is a rifle battalion of the Special Tasks Patrol Police subordinated to Ministry of Internal Affairs of Ukraine. The battalion is based in Ternopil. It was established in 2014 in the wake of the War in Donbass and has, since then seen regular combat on the frontlines.

== History ==
It was established on 24 April 2014, in order to ensure the rights and freedoms of the residents of Ternopil Oblast, protect the region from criminal organizations and protect public order. It was composed mainly of Euromaidan activists, volunteers and veterans. On 28 June 2014, senior chaplain Vyacheslav Kizilov consecrated the crucifix of the battalion. In the first days of July 2014, the battalion was deployed to ATO zone. On 2 August 2014, more soldiers of the battalion went to the ATO zone. On 7 September 2014, 50 soldiers of the battalion returned to Ternopil. On 5 September 2014, 50 personnel of the Battalion were provided with two sets of uniforms, personal protective equipment, and 5th class body armour, ammunition, diesel generators amongst other equipment. They departed after being blessed by priests. On 12 September 2014, the Battalion did a press conference stating that "Ternopil" battalion did not partake in combat, but was very close to the front. Mostly it performed operations at checkpoints: first in the Kharkiv Oblast, and then Pervomaisk and Popasna. On 18 November 2014, the deployed soldiers returned home. During 2015–2016, the battalion continued performing non-combat operations in the ATO zone. In May 2016 it was reformed into a police company.

At the end of March 2022, the "Ternopil" battalion was fighting side by side with the Armed Forces of Ukraine, especially during the Battle of Popasna as well as in Zolote and Katerynivka. Intensive battles were fought for Popasna, it being practically razed to the ground. However, the fighters of the Battalion maintained their positions. Three soldiers of the Battalion were killed during the Battle of Popasna following which, the Battalion took part in the Battle of Lysychansk, Battle of Bakhmut and the Pokrovsk offensive. A soldier of the Battalion (Serhiy Rudy) was killed on 27 April 2022, during artillery shelling of Zolote. Later, some of its personnel were transferred to Liut Brigade. On 22 March 2024, it destroyed Russian missiles over the airspace of Ternopil. In 2024, it was reformed into a Rifle Battalion. On 27 June 2024, it was completely reformed into a rifle battalion. In July 2024, the "Ternopil Rifle Battalion" started combat training as it, in addition to Ternopil company also included police officers of the Ternopil police directorate, who had no combat experience.

== Gallery ==
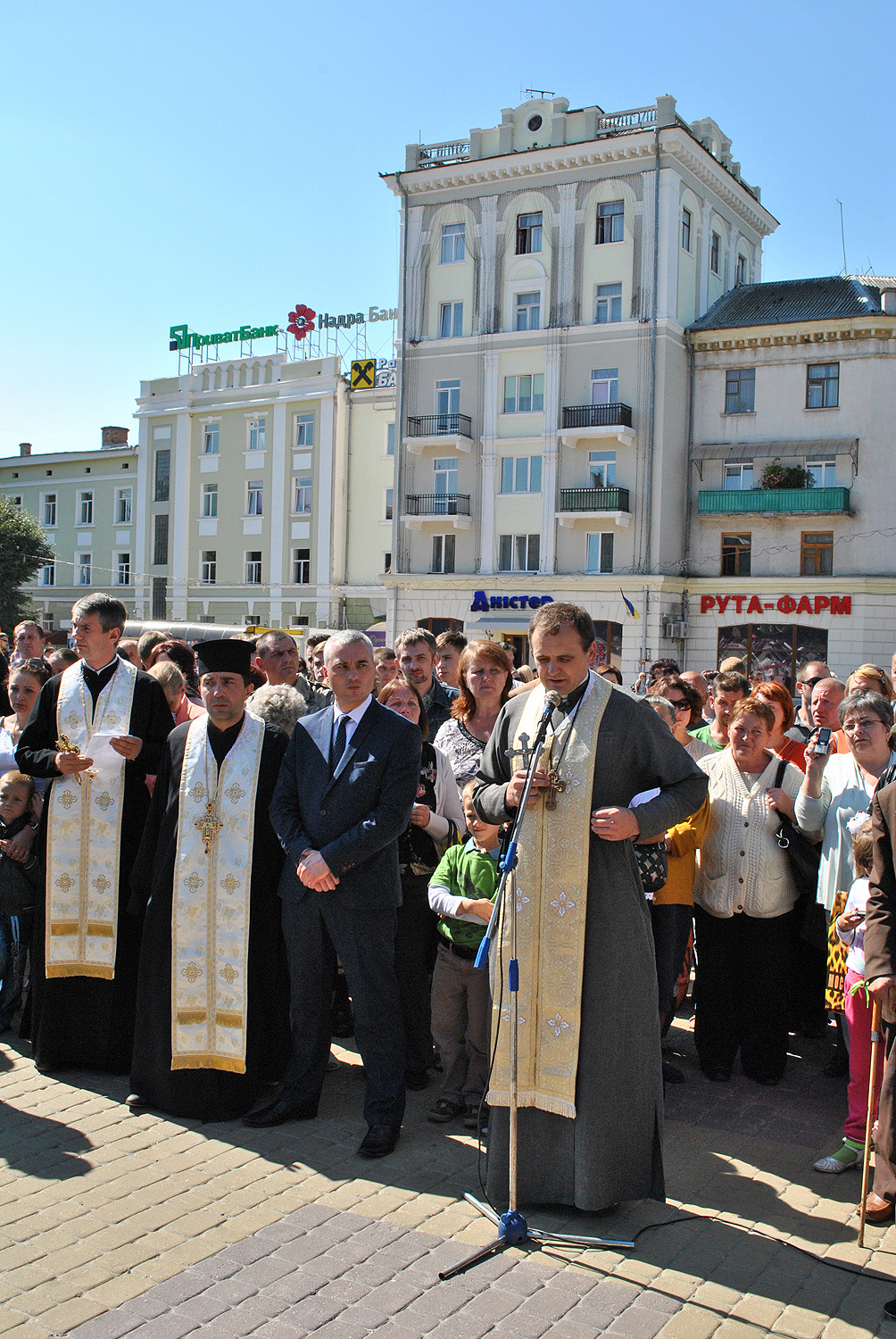
Blessing by priests

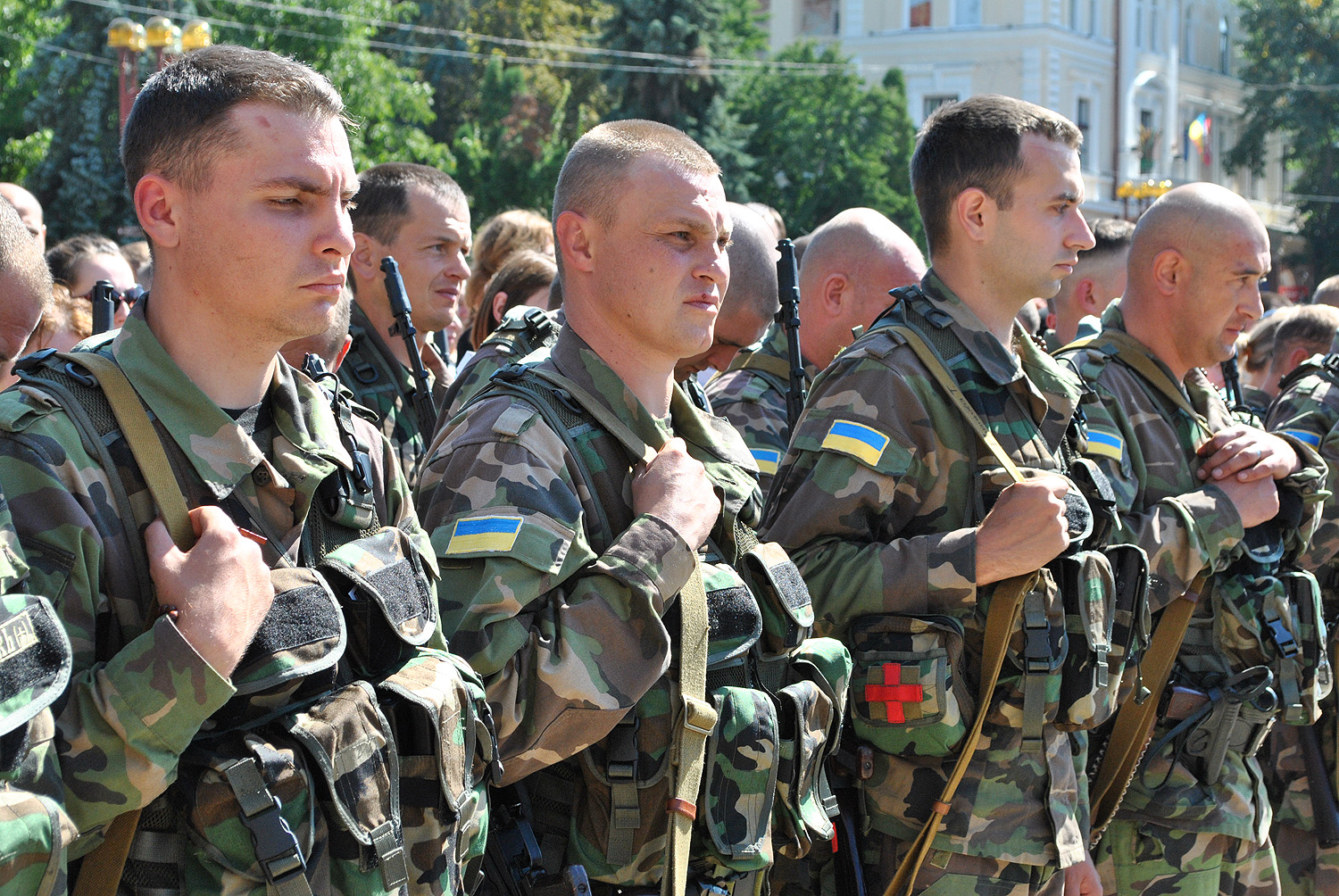
Soldiers of the "Ternopil" battalion

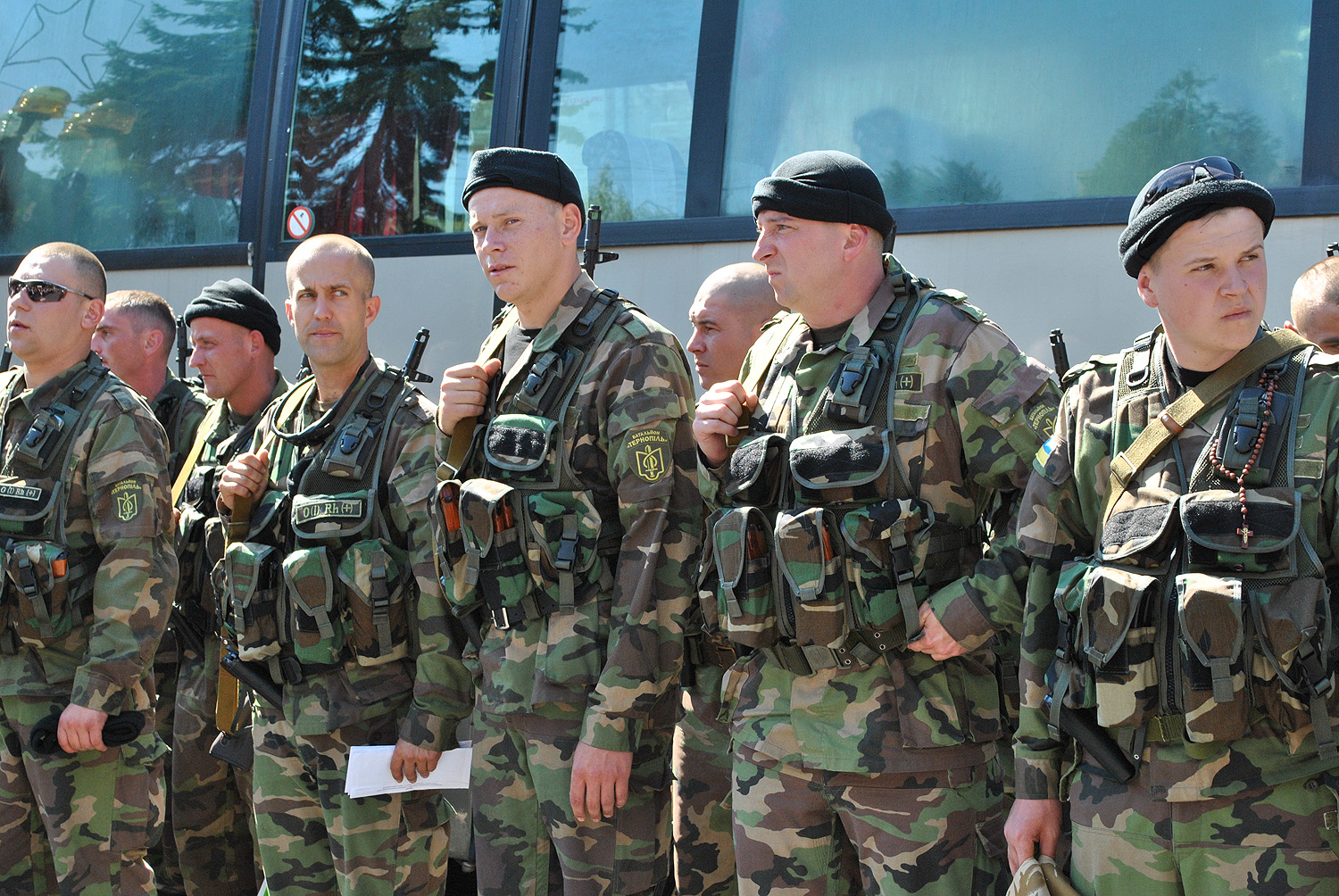
Soldiers of the "Ternopil" battalion

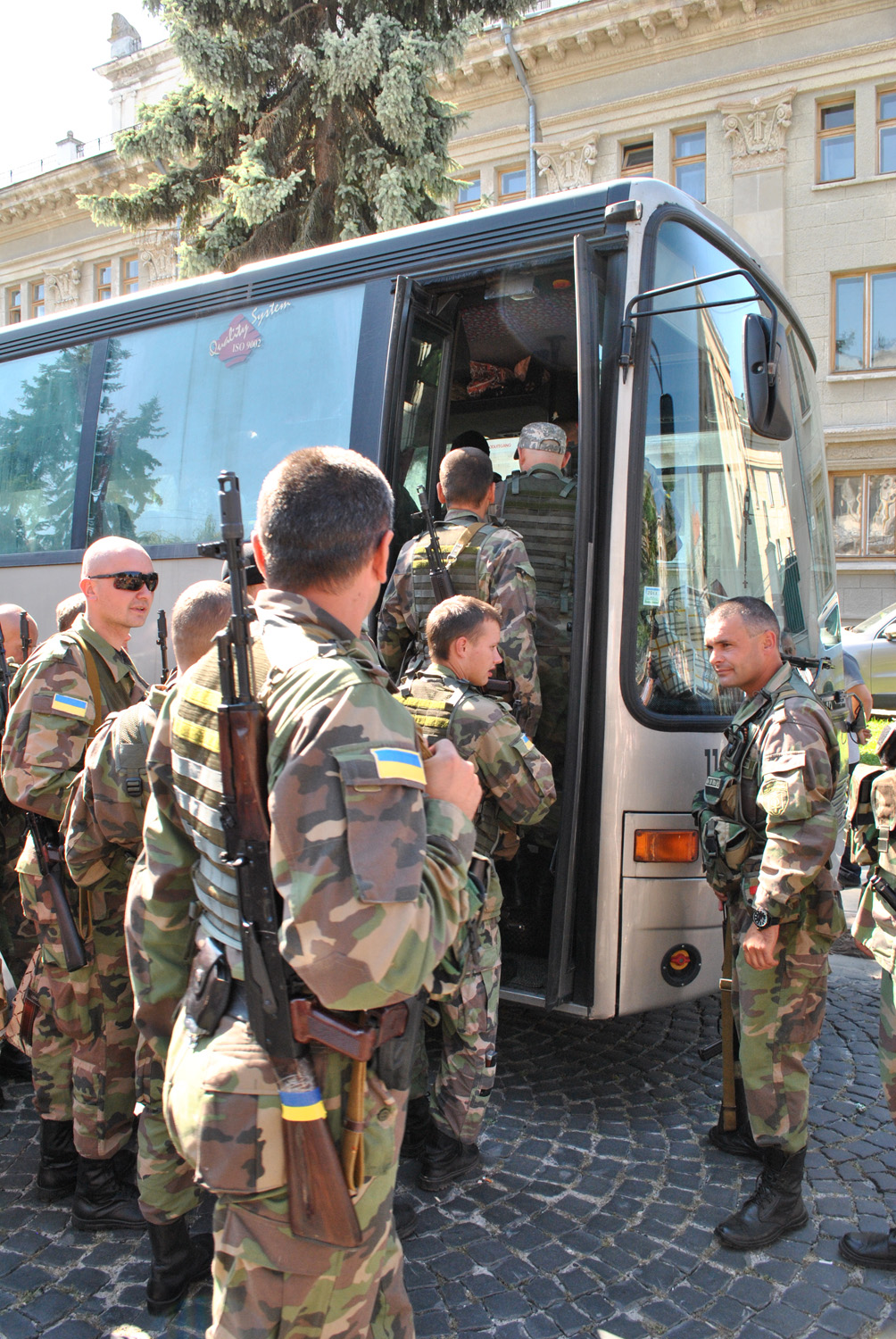
Boarding of buses by the battalion

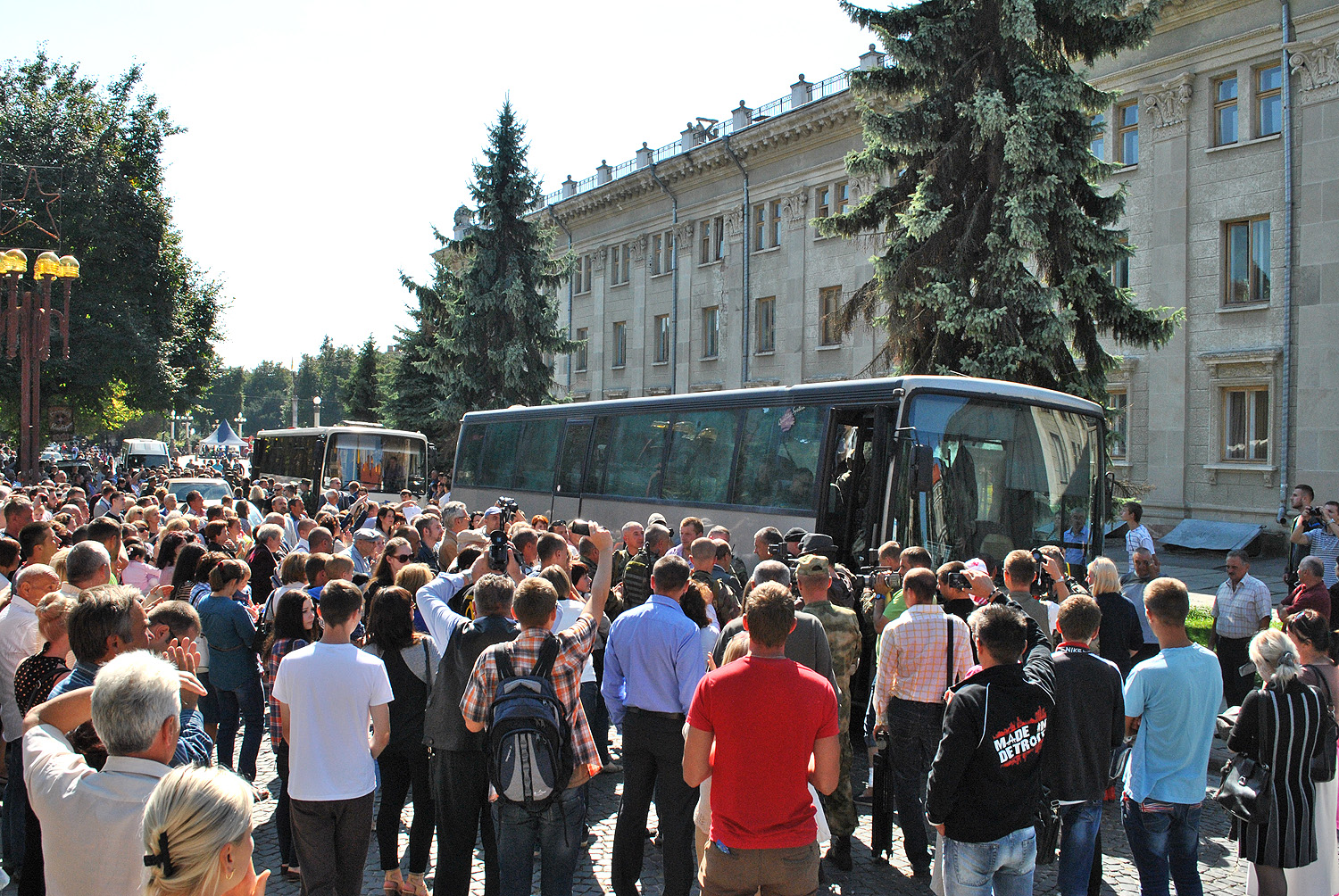
Farewell meeting of the battalion

== External Media ==
External videos
- Бійці батальйону «Тернопіль» проходять навчання on YouTube
- 110 міліціонерів Тернопільщини сьогодні поїхали в зону АТО on YouTube
- 110 правоохоронців поїхали в зону АТО on YouTube
- Про важливе. Володимир Катрук on YouTube
- Живими та здоровими повернулись додому бійці батальйону спецпризначення «Тернопіль» on YouTube
- Бійці батальйону «Тернопіль» тренують професійні навички на полігоні on YouTube
- Півсотні бійців батальйону «Тернопіль» відбули на схід on YouTube
