= Tavr Battalion (Ukraine) =

- Ukrainian: Штурмовий батальйон поліції «Тавр»
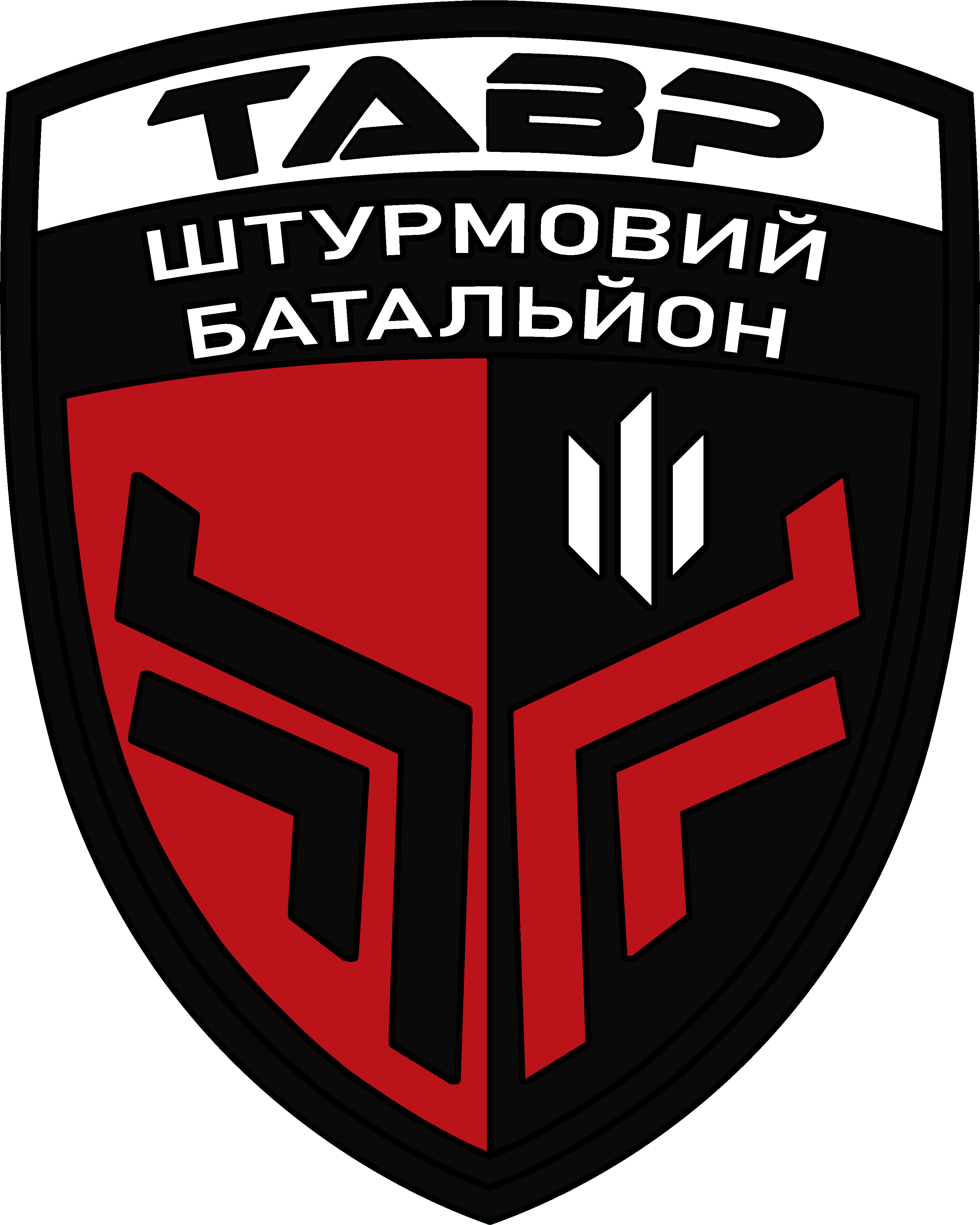
- Tavr Battalion Insignia
- Active: 2022 - now
- Country: Ukraine
- Branch: Ministry of Internal Affairs
- Type: Special Tasks Patrol Police
- Part of: Tsunami Regiment
- Garrison/HQ: Mykolaiv
- Patron: Saint Nicholas
- Engagements: Russo-Ukrainian war; 2014 pro-Russian unrest in Ukraine; War in Donbas; Battle of Lutuhyne; Russian invasion of Ukraine; Southern Ukraine campaign; Battle of Mykolaiv; Eastern Ukraine campaign; Battle of Chasiv Yar

Commanders
- Ceremonial chief: Oleksandr Melsykovich Mkhitaryan
- Notable commanders: Mykhailo Moshchanets
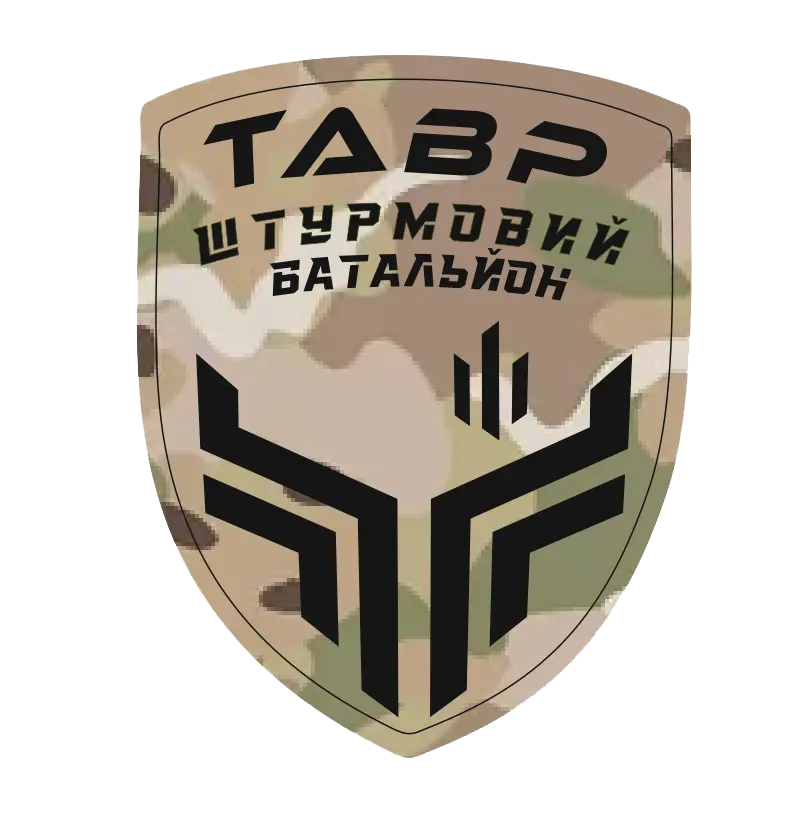
- Field Insignia

The Tavr Battalion formerly the Svyatyi Mykolai Battalion (lit. Saint Nicholas Battalion), also known as Mykolaiv Battalion, is a battalion of the Tsunami Regiment of the Liut Brigade of the Special Tasks Patrol Police subordinated to Ministry of Internal Affairs of Ukraine. It was established in 2014 and has, since then seen regular combat on the frontlines in addition to special counter-crime operations.

== History ==
The formation was established on 5 May 2014 in Mykolaiv during the 2014 pro-Russian unrest in Ukraine, which led to separatist movements in southern and eastern regions of Ukraine. Volunteers for the Battalion had to be aged 18 to 50 years. In May 2014, its task was to man roadblocks on the outskirts of Mykolaiv. On 11 July 2014, they began operating in Luhansk Oblast during the war in Donbas. The unit updates its equipment through a charity foundation, obtaining a Kamaz truck. and bulletproof vests. Their main task in the ATO zone included the neutralization of separatist reconnaissance and sabotage units. On 16 August 2014, 49 soldiers of the special battalion returned to Mykolaiv from the ATO zone. On 1 September 2014, the battalion left Lutuhyne following its capture by separatists. On 16 September 2014, a detachment of battalion again went to the ATO zone.

On 2 January 2016, the ex-commander of the disbanded Mykolaiv PPS battalion, Lieutenant Colonel Mykhailo Moshchanets became the battalion's commander. It was again deployed to the ATO zone for law enforcement and maintenance of public order, replacing the personnel who were stationed there for a long time. On 4 September 2016, joint infantry patrol units were established in Mykolaiv encompassing personnel of the Battalion to take part in operations against increasing crime rates in the city. On 29 July 2017, the battalion was again deployed to the ATO zone to take part in operations against illegal weapons and drugs, separatists and their collaborators.

External videos
- 1. Батальон МВД Украины «Николаев».
- 2. «Святой Николай» в зоне АТО.

Following the Russian invasion of Ukraine, the battalion took part in the Battle of Mykolaiv, during which on 26 February 2022, two personnel of the battalion (Yury Volodymyrovych Kravchenko and Yaroslav Mykolayovych Lukyanenko) were killed in action. On 5 May 2022, the battalion was reformed into the Tavr Battalion which in 2023, became the fourth battalion as part of the Tsunami Regiment of the Liut Brigade. On 31 March 2023, Major Volodymyr Voloshyn, of the Tavr Battalion died as a result of vehicle accident, while on duty. In the liberated Kherson Oblast, the personnel of the Tavr Battalion came under attack by Russian forces by artillery, killing a soldier of the battalion (Yury Khyzhinsky) and wounding four others. In June 2024, the Battalion took part in the Battle of Chasiv Yar. Despite the Russian shelling and numerous assaults, the battalion held its positions preventing a Russian capture.

== See also ==
- List of special law enforcement units
