= Lviv Battalion (Ukraine) =

- Ukrainian: Львівський батальйон міліції
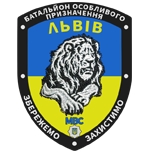
- Lviv Battalion Insignia
- Active: 2014–present
- Country: Ukraine
- Branch: Ministry of Internal Affairs
- Type: Special Tasks Patrol Police
- Garrison/HQ: Lviv
- Engagements: Russo-Ukrainian War; War in Donbass; Battle of Debaltseve; 2022 Russian invasion of Ukraine; Eastern Ukraine campaign; Battle of Lysychansk; Battle of Bakhmut

Commanders
- Current commander: Tsyorok Volodymyr Romanovych

The Lviv Battalion is a battalion of the Special Tasks Patrol Police subordinated to Ministry of Internal Affairs of Ukraine. The regiment is based in Lviv. It was established in 2014 in the wake of the War in Donbass and has, since then seen regular combat on the frontlines.

== History ==
On 16 April 2014, the Lviv Battalion was established in the Lviv Oblast to operate in the ATO zone as well as for law enforcement in Lviv Oblast, tasked to ensure the protection of life, rights, freedoms and legitimate interests of citizens, society and the state from criminal and other illegal organization, to maintain public order and ensure safety in the ATO zone as well as Lviv Oblast. The Lviv Regional State Administration also developed measures for the support of the battalion. Persons aged between 20 and 35, deemed fit for military service and had no criminal record as well as veterans were able to join the battalion. The personnel underwent heavy training in June 2014. On 28 June 2014, 60 soldiers of the battalion voluntarily left the training center in Zolochiv due to unsatisfactory living conditions. Initially, it was announced that training would take three days, but was extended for a week due to rain. So the personnel found themselves without proper clothing and shoes in leaking tents. After that, a personnel meeting was held at battalion's training base. 22 personnel were dismissed from the battalion. In July 2014, the personnel of the Battalion were trained at the "Vereshchytsia" educational and training center of the Lviv State University of Internal Affairs. During the training, the soldiers of the battalion went through a course of marksmanship training with Makarov pistols and Kalashnikov rifles and learnt about escorting and protecting convoys as well as clearing urban and forested areas and protecting checkpoints. The National Guard of Ukraine, conducting practical engineering and medical training with new recruits, also provided assistance in the training of battalion. Ihor Volskyi became the battalion's commander while Zoreslav Kainsky became his deputy. On 12 July 2014, the fighters of the Lviv battalion took an oath of loyalty to Ukraine.

There are many Euromaidan activists among us, there are even former centurions. They all decided that today patriots must wear police uniforms.

On 24 July 2014, the Battalion was deployed to the ATO zone. On 17 August 2014, the battalion took part in the capture of Krymske, during the Battle, a soldier of the Battalion (Popovych Volodymyr Vasyliovych) was killed and two others (Yatseyko Ivan Ivanovych and Vasylenko Stepan Orestovych) were wounded. In late 2014, the Battalion took part in the Battle of Debaltseve as well as operated near Stanytsia Luhanska. On 14 January 2015, a soldier of the Battalion (Dorosh Taras Ruslanovych) was killed as a result of sniper fire while operating in Stanytsia Luhanska. In the afternoon of 10 February 2015, near Lohvynove, two vehicles of the Battalion hit a landmine and were ambushed, head of the Lviv regional police Zagaria Dmytro Dmytrovych and the commander of the battalion, Ihor Hryhorovych Volsky, were wounded while an officer, Dmytro Oleksandrovych Ternovy had died from the mine explosion. The officers held the defense for several hours, eventually soldiers of the Lviv battalion and the National Guard of Ukraine conducted 3 combat rescue sorties, eventually succeeding to evacuate the 8 entrapped personnel in the third attempt. On 13 February 2015, during the Battle of Debaltseve, two soldiers of the Battalion (Lehminko Ihor Ihorovych and Domchenko Vladyslav Anatoliyovych) were killed as a result of shelling. A soldier of the battalion (Oleg Bogdanovych Kubra) died on 24 November 2015. On 30 September 2016, the battalion was operating in Mariupol, where the battalion was awarded as the best law enforcement unit operating in ATO zone. Following the Russian invasion of Ukraine on 24 February 2022, the soldiers of the battalion were deployed to the frontlines. On 7 March 2022, a soldier of the battalion (Roman Rushchyshyn) was killed in Luhansk Oblast. On 11 June 2022, they were deployed in Donetsk Oblast where they saw combat especially during the Battle of Bakhmut.

== Command ==
Commanders:

- Ihor Hryhorovych Volskyi (2014–2015)
- Andriy Vasyliovych Vikhot (2015–2017)
- Volodymyr Romanovych Tsyorok (2017-)

Deputy Commanders:

- Dyakov Roman (2014–2017)
- Vasyl Yuriyovych Solomiychuk (2018-)

== Sources ==
- Байдужість вбиває. Частина 1 // «Громадське ТБ», 8 жовтня 2014
