= Kherson Rifle Battalion (Ukraine) =

- Ukrainian: Херсонська поліцейська рота
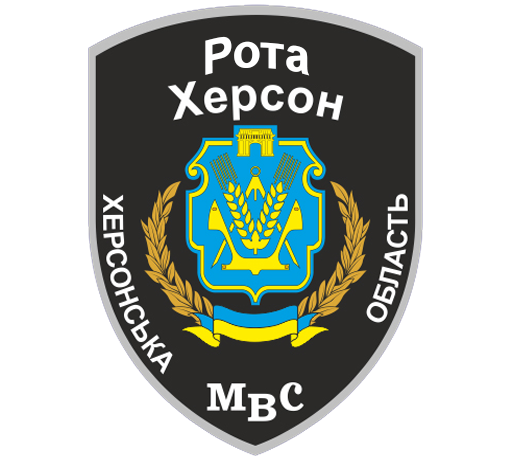
- Kherson Rifle Battalion Insignia
- Active: 2014–present
- Country: Ukraine
- Branch: Ministry of Internal Affairs
- Type: Special Tasks Patrol Police
- Garrison/HQ: Kherson
- Engagements: Russo-Ukrainian War; War in Donbass; Battle of Ilovaisk; 2022 Russian invasion of Ukraine; Southern Ukraine campaign; Battle of Kherson; 2022 Kherson counteroffensive; Liberation of Kherson; Kherson strikes (2022–present)

Commanders
- Notable commanders: Storcheus Ruslan Oleksandrovych †

Insignia
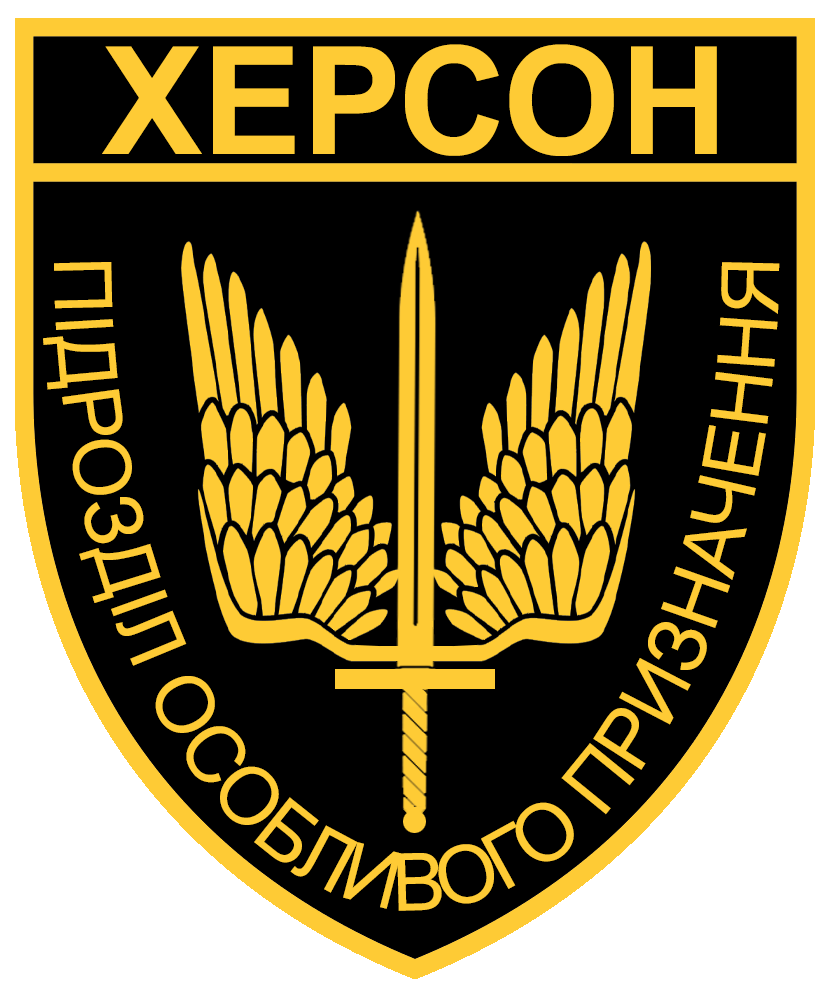
- Former Insignia

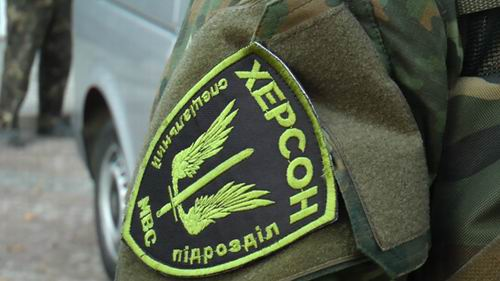
- Former Insignia

The Kherson Rifle Battalion is a Rifle Battalion of the Special Tasks Patrol Police subordinated to Ministry of Internal Affairs of Ukraine. The company is based in Kherson. It was established in 2014 in the wake of the War in Donbass and has, since then seen regular combat on the frontlines.

== History ==
It was established in May 2014 in Kherson as a battalion was composed of 300 personnel in 6 platoons of 50 personnel each and Oleksandr Gubarev was appointed as its commander. On 19 August 2014, 50 soldiers of the battalion went to the ATO zone. On the morning of 25 August 2014, Vyacheslav Vlasenko, the commander of Donbas Battalion, summoned the commanders of Myrotvorets and Kherson battalions to a meeting. The vehicle of Kherson battalion commander, Storcheus Ruslan Oleksandrovych was ambushed on the way resulting in his death and the death of his driver, Oleg Anatoliyovych Peshkov. The Battalion, now without a commander, temporarily came under the command of Semen Semenchenko. On 26 August 2014, a soldier of the Battalion (Maksym Petrovych Zhekov) was killed as a result of artillery shelling by separatists at the battalion's positions at Ilovaisk school. On 29 August 2014, during the Battle of Ilovaisk and the escape from the encirclement, six soldiers of the Battalion (Ruslan Serhiyovych Salivonchyk, Pavlo Valeriyovych Mazur, Kovalev Vladyslav Viktorovych, Sharygin Artem Vitaliyovych, Hrebinsky Oleg Vilyamovich and Oleg Pavlovich Vovchenko) were killed in action and several more were wounded. On 1 September 2014, a part of the battalion returned followed by more personnel, some more personnel of the Battalion were also deployed to partake in the Battle of Pisky. In 2020, it was reformed into a company.

Following the Russian invasion of Ukraine in February 2022, the unit did not receive an official order to partake in the Battle of Kherson, the company's command retreated from the city leaving its personnel to fight Russian forces by themselves. On 19 September 2023, a soldier of the company (Andriy Tarchynskyi) was killed as a result of artillery shelling on Kherson which also wounded two civilians. In 2024, it was reformed into a Battalion with the honorary name "Striletski".
