= Special Police Forces (Ukraine) =

Ukrainian government paramilitary

Special Police Forces Патрульна служба поліції особливого призначення України
- Ministry of Internal Affairs emblem

Agency overview
- Formed: July 2, 2015; 11 years ago

Jurisdictional structure
- Operations jurisdiction: Ukraine

Operational structure
- Minister responsible: Ihor Klymenko, Minister of Internal Affairs
- Parent agency: Ministry of Internal Affairs

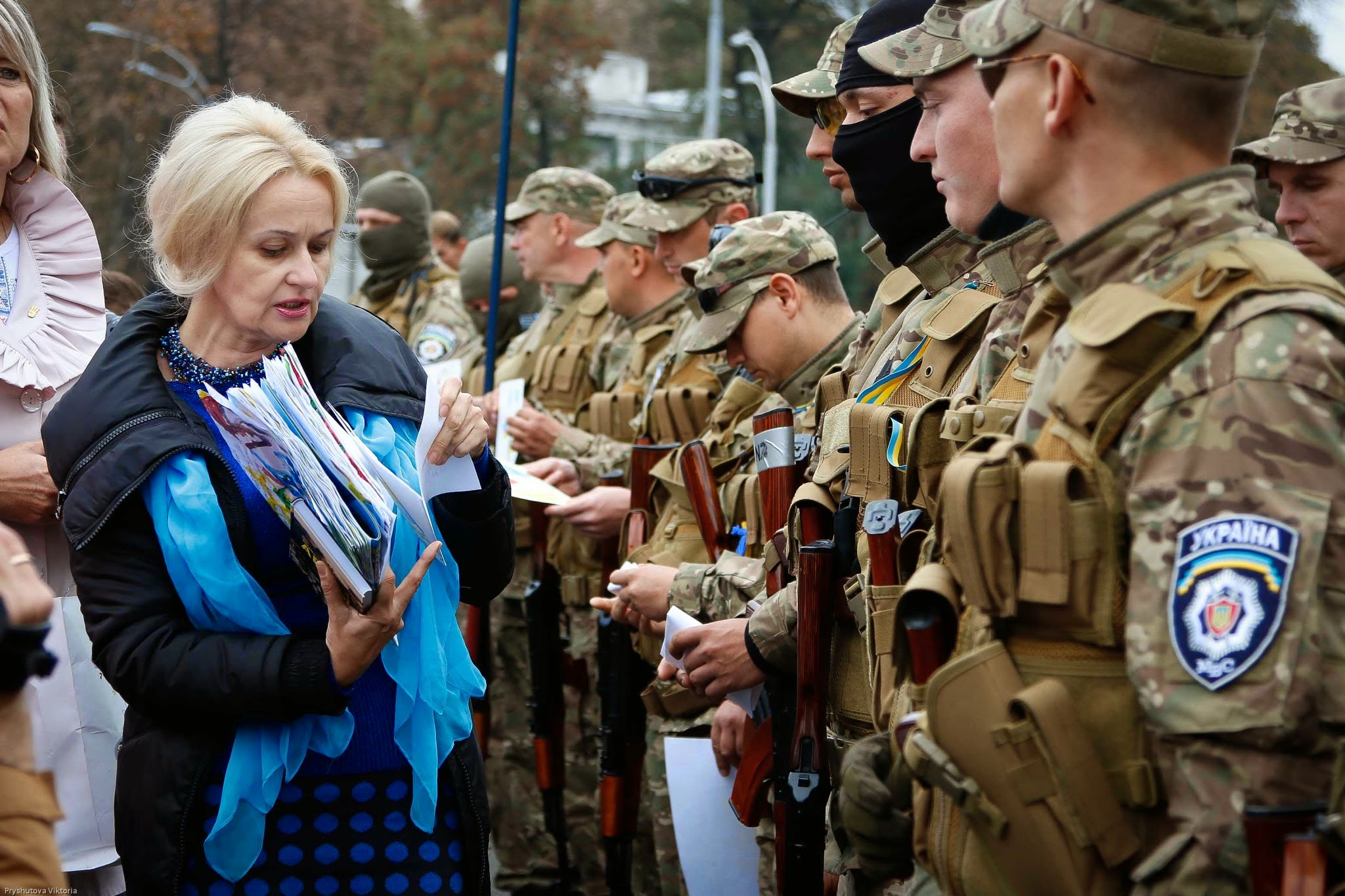
Members of the "Sich" Battalion, linked to political party Svoboda, in a formation. The embroidered patch of the Militsiya can be seen on their sleeves

The Special Police Forces (Ukrainian: Спеціальні поліцейські сили, romanized: Spetsialni politseiski syly) is a Ukrainian volunteer corps of law enforcement units, part of the Ministry of Internal Affairs of Ukraine. They were formed during the 2014 pro-Russian unrest in Ukraine to strengthen the state’s capacity to maintain public order and security, and were later deployed to Eastern Ukraine as a paramilitary force to fight against Pro-Russian separatists.

The units were primarily composed of volunteers, including former police officers, reservists, and civilians. Similar to the Territorial Defence Battalions, which were under the Ministry of Defence, the Special Police Forces were volunteer formations but fell under the Ministry of Internal Affairs. In addition, many of the units also had links with far-right and nationalist groups. In the first months of the War in Donbas, these volunteer forces took the brunt of the fighting.

In 2023, as part of the Offensive Guard initiative, most of the former Special Police Forces battalions were reformed into the Liut Brigade.

== History ==
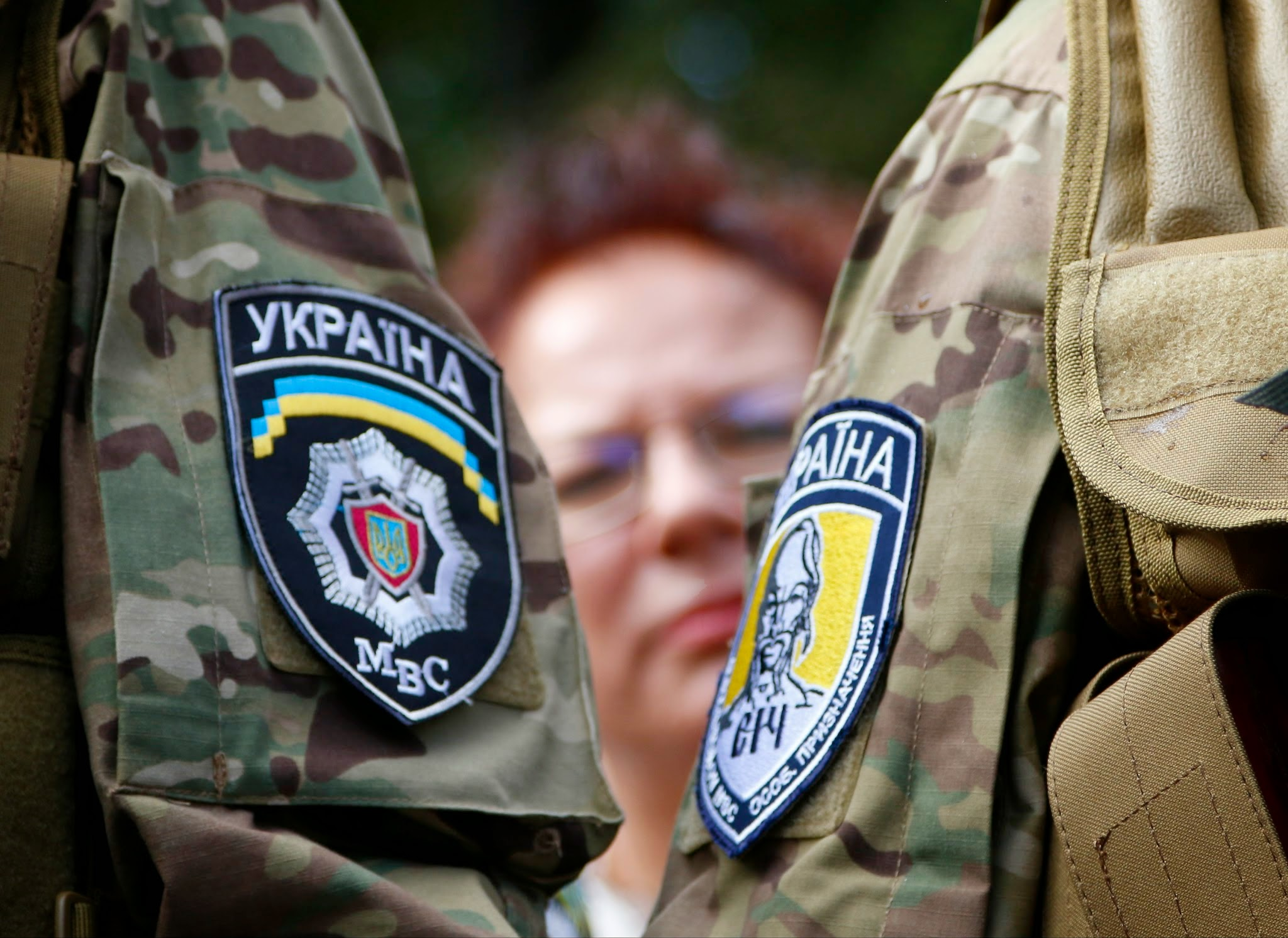
Embroidered patches of the Militsiya and Sich Battalion

In April 2014, Minister of Internal Affairs Arsen Avakov issued an order to create battalions of special purpose within the Ministry of Internal Affairs structure.

Their goal was to protect public order and important facilities across Ukraine, but all of these units were eventually sent to the east to counter Russian aggression.

After the reformation of National Police in 2015, the units were reformed as Special Task Patrol Police units.

At war in Donbas, the forces of the Special Tasks Patrol Police have fought against pro-Russian separatists as a paramilitary force. Many of the units also engaged against Russian forces at the Russian invasion of Ukraine and in 2023 most units were reformed and merged into the Liut Brigade as part of the Offensive Guard campaign.

== Structure ==
=== Special Police Forces ===
- Chernihiv Battalion, Chernihiv Oblast
- East Company, Kharkiv, Kharkiv Oblast
- Kherson Battalion, Kherson, Kherson Oblast
- Khyzhak Brigade
- KORD Brigade
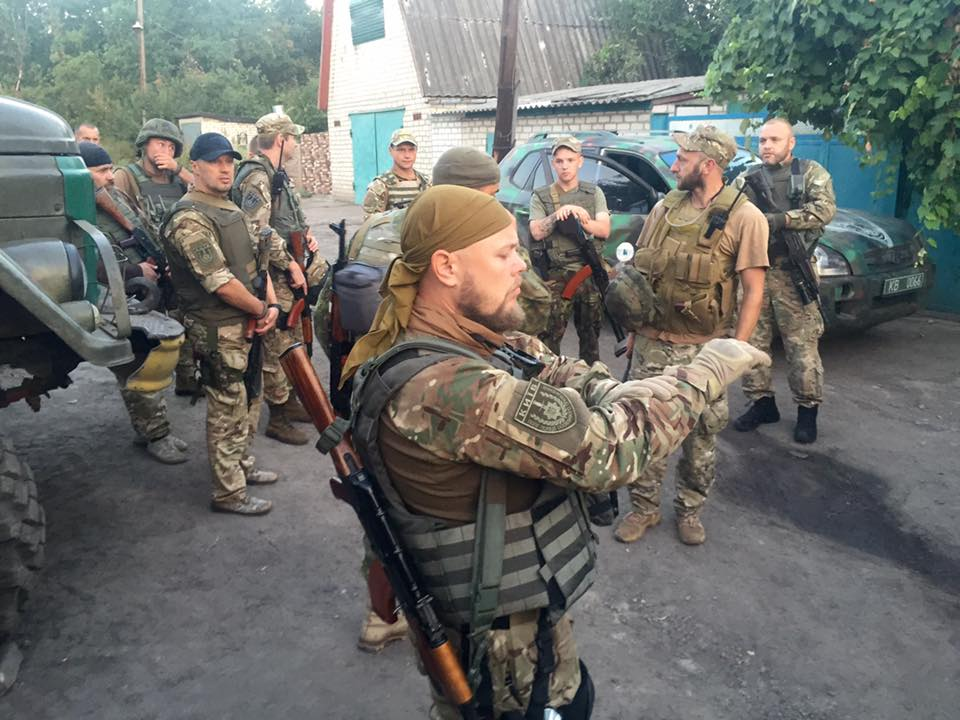
- Kyiv Regiment in Avdiivka, 2016
  Kyiv Regiment, Kyiv, Kyiv Oblast
  - 1st Police Company Kyiv-1
  - 2nd Police Company Kyiv-2
  - 3rd Police Company Zoloti Vorota
  - 4th Police Company Sich
- Lviv Battalion, Lviv, Lviv Oblast
- Lyut Brigade, Kyiv, Kyiv Oblast
  - Tsunami Assault Regiment
    - Tavr Battalion
  - Safari Assault Regiment
  - Luhansk Assault Regiment
  - Myrotvorets Battalion
    - Kyivschyna Company
    - Tornado Company
    - Harpoon Company
  - Enei Police Battalion
    - Sviatoslav Company
  - Skif Battalion
  - Zakhid Battalion
    - Svityaz Company
    - Bohdan Company
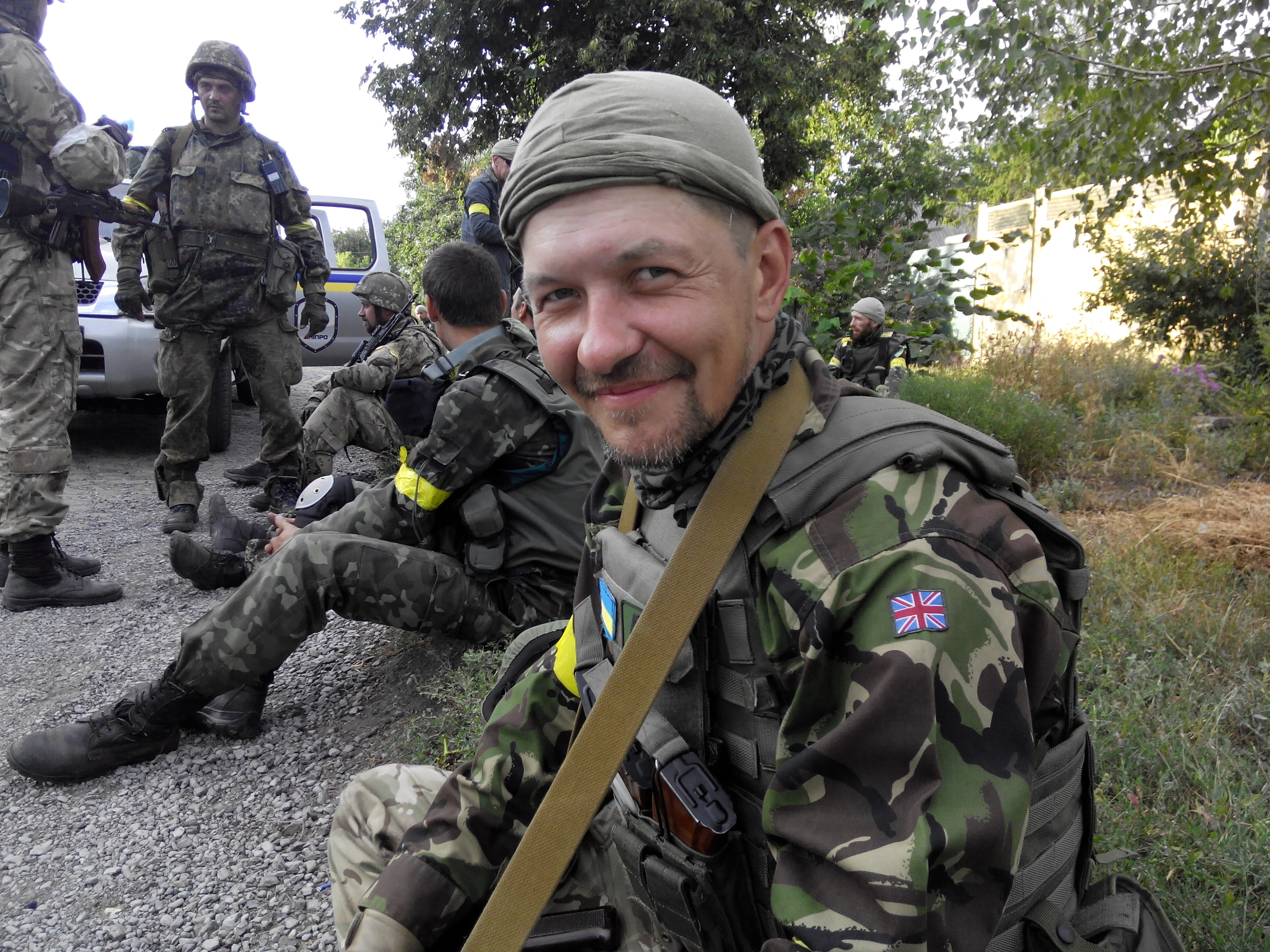
  - Dnipro-1 volunteers in the Donbas, August 2014
    Dnipro-1 Regiment
    - Kryvbas Company
    - Donetsk-1 Company
    - Krym Company
  - Shtorm Battalion
  - Ivano-Frankivsk Company
- Poltava Battalion, Poltava, Poltava Oblast
  - Kremenchuk Company
- Sumy Company, Sumy, Sumy Oblast
- Ternopil Battalion, Ternopil, Ternopil Oblast
- Vinnytsya Battalion, Vinnytsia Oblast

=== Former special police units ===
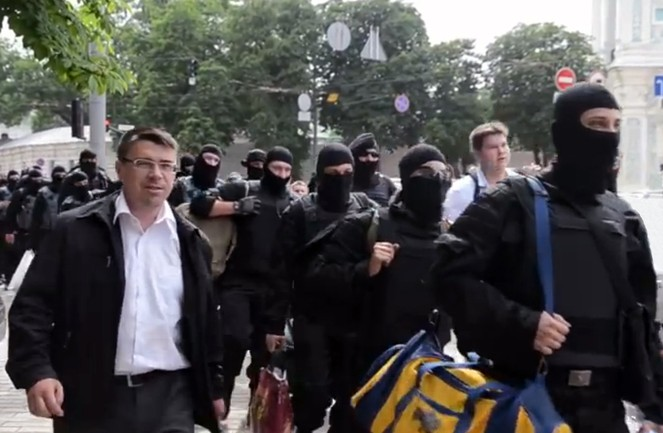
- Volunteers of the special police "Azov" Battalion
  Azov Battalion (батальйон "Азов") – a volunteer battalion which became notable for its participation on the Battle of Mariupol and controversial as it was formed by members coming from ultranationalist and neonazi parties. In September 2014, it was expanded into a regiment and transferred to the command of the National Guard of Ukraine.
- Shakhtarsk Battalion (батальйон ПСМОП "Шахтарськ") – A former all volunteer territorial defence battalion of mostly former convicts from Donbas established in Shakhtarsk in June 2014 (because the battalion is reporting to the Interior Ministry its members became formally police officers). In October 2014 the unit was disbanded after 50 members of the battalion were accused of looting and hooliganism. The battalion was then resurrected as the "Tornado" police battalion.
- Tornado battalion – After the "Shakhtarsk" police battalion was disbanded in October 2014 after 50 members of the battalion were accused of looting and hooliganism. it was resurrected as the "Tornado" police battalion. The battalion was about 100 people strong and most members were former convicts from Donbas (because the battalion is reporting to the Interior Ministry its members were formally police officers). On 18 June 2015 the unit was disbanded after members were accused of looting, rape and torture. Initially the battalion refused to stop operations and disarm. Former battalion members were accused and arrested for smuggling cast iron from territory under separatist control.

== See also ==
- Rapid Operational Response Unit
