= 15 March 2024 Odesa missile strikes =

- Part of the Russian invasion of Ukraine (Southern theater of military operations)
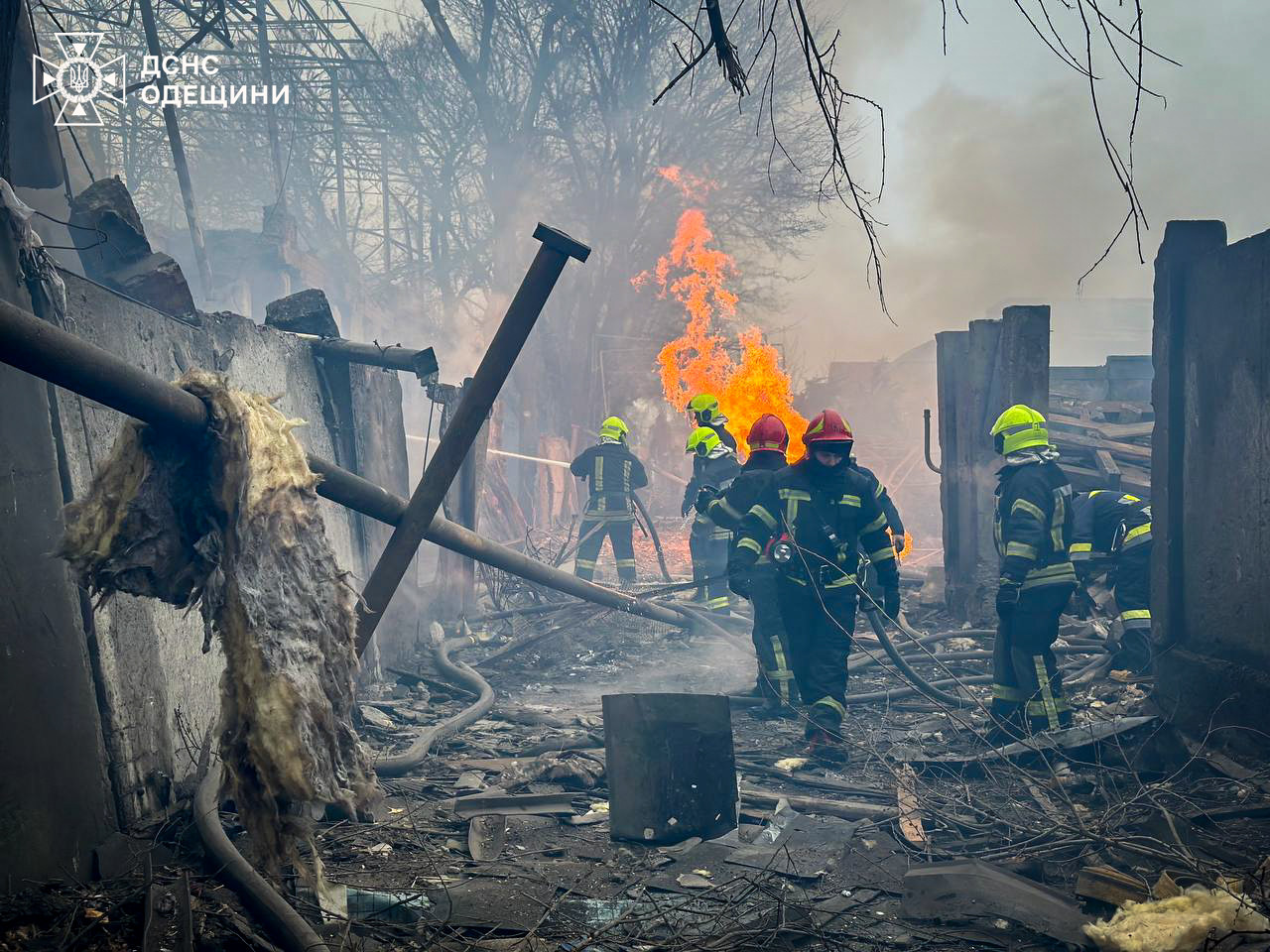
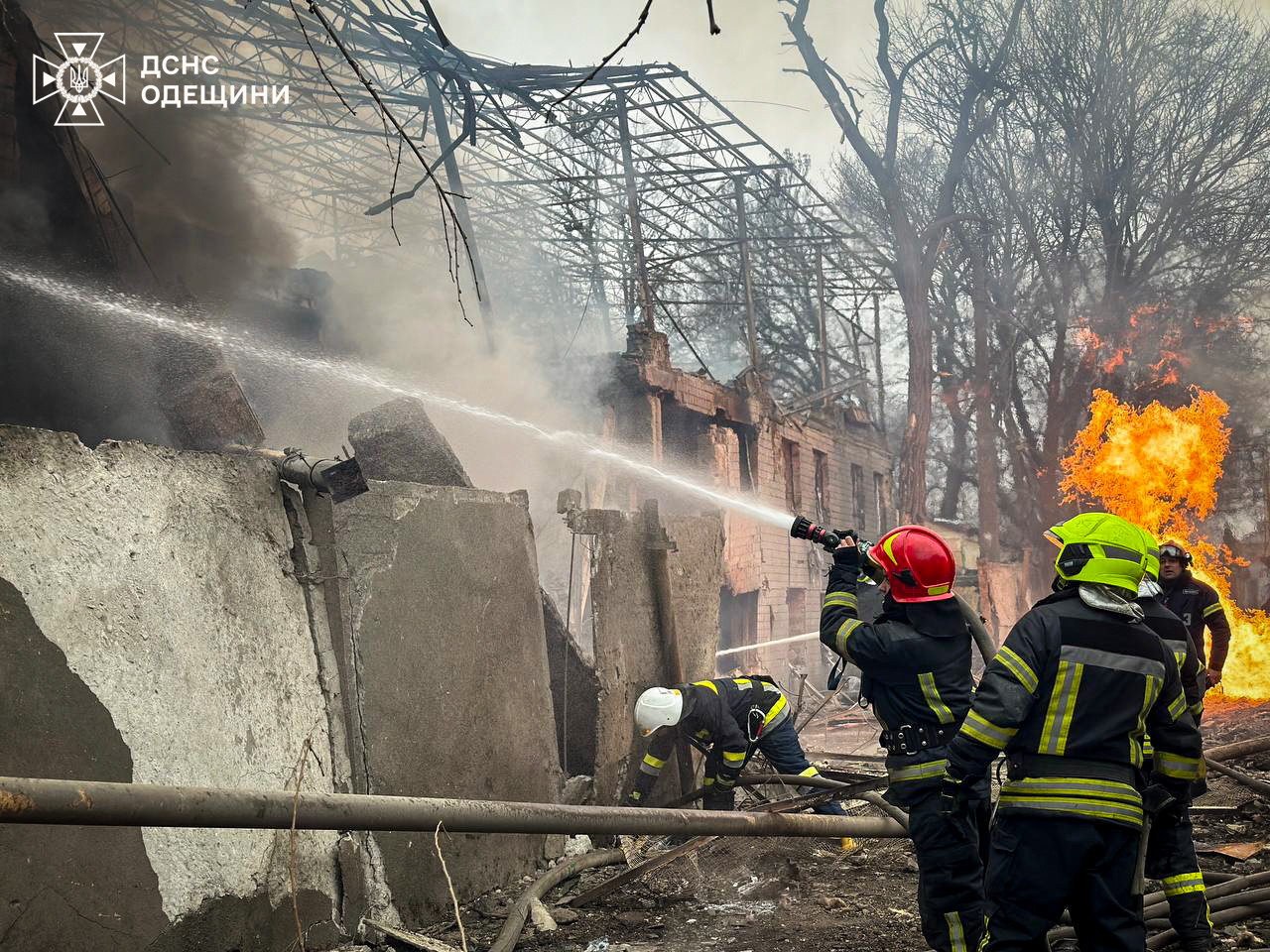
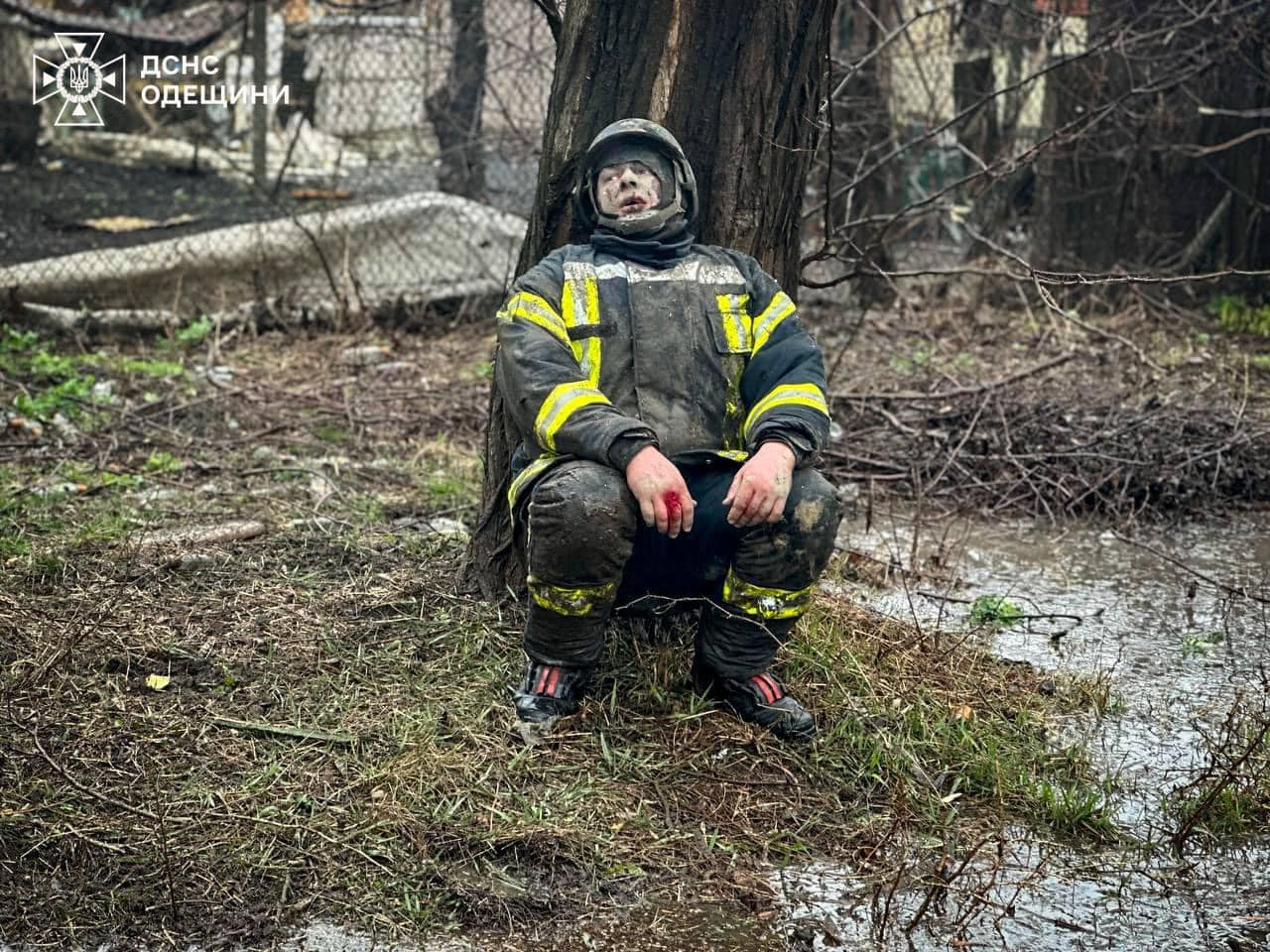
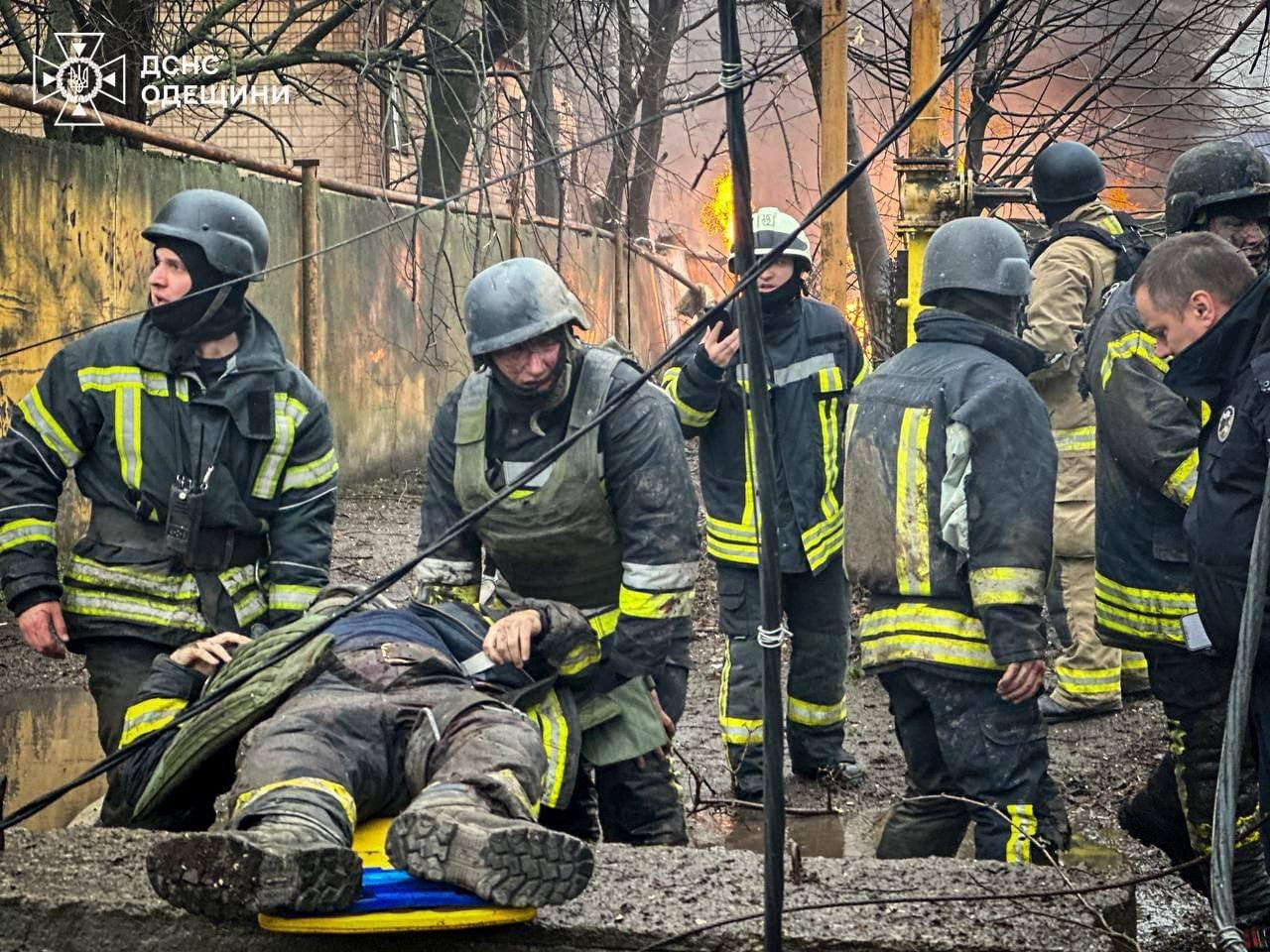
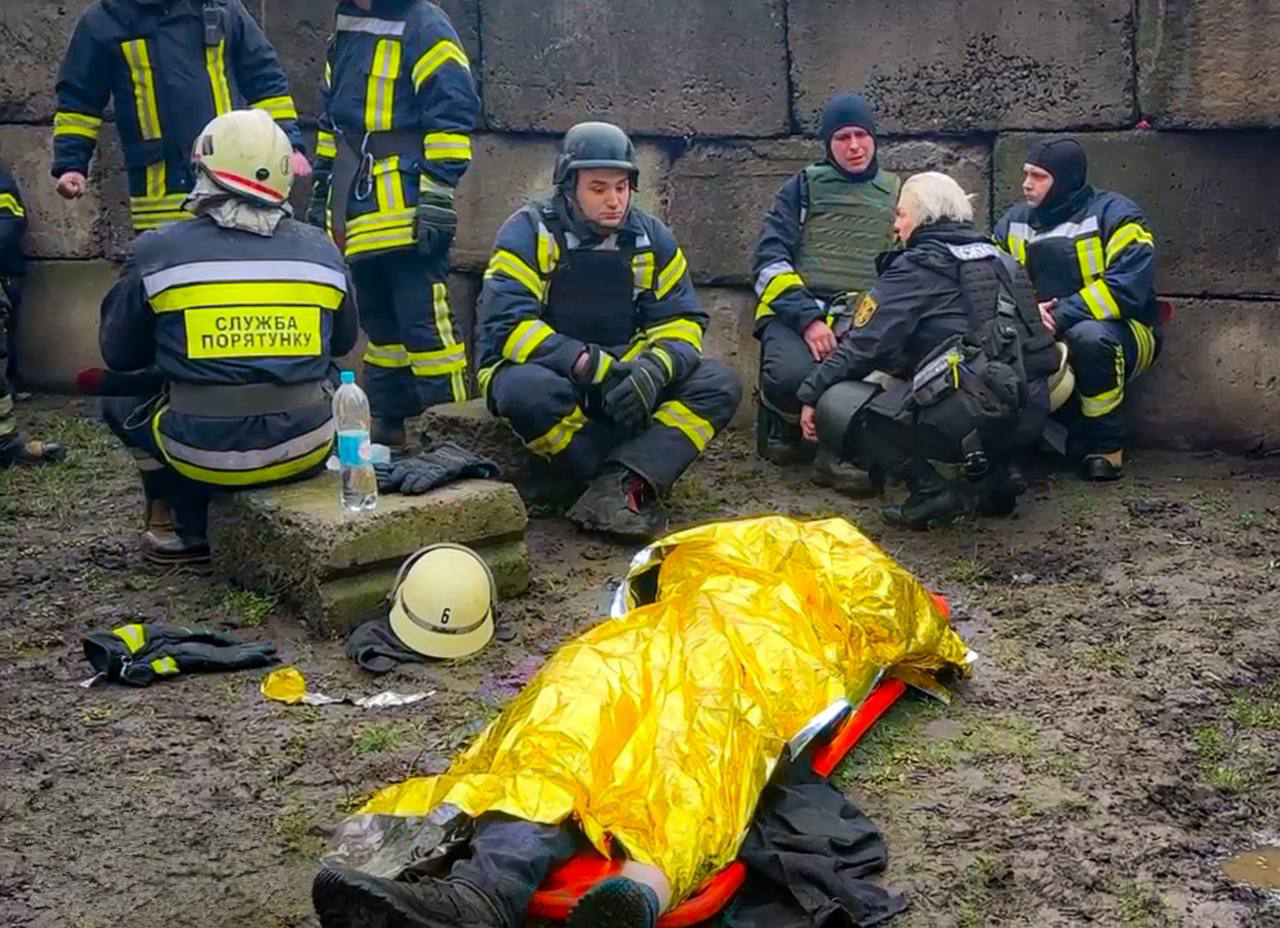
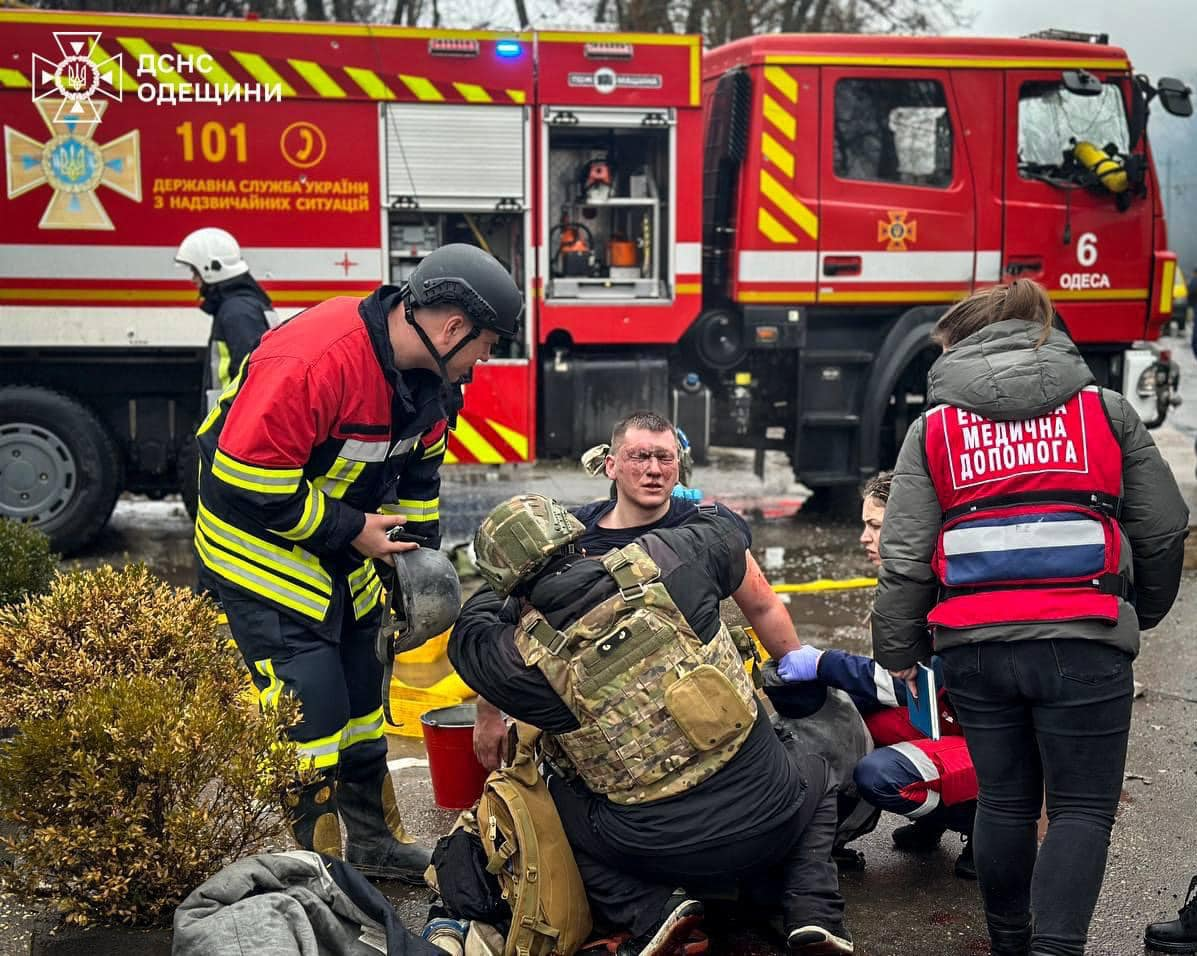
- Consequences of the Russian missile strike
- 'Mriya' Sanatorium, targeted by both missiles
- Location: Odesa, Odesa Oblast, Ukraine
- Date: March 15, 2024; ~11:03 and ~11:37 (UTC+2)
- Target: Tsunami Regiment of the Liut Brigade(according to Russia)
- Attack type: Surface-to-surface missile strike
- Weapon: 2 ballistic missiles from Iskander-M missile system
- Deaths: 21
- Injuries: 74 (38 hospitalized, including 11 critically injured)
- Perpetrator: Armed Forces of the Russian Federation

Missile strikes on Odesa were carried out during the day on March 15, 2024, with a half-hour interval by the Armed Forces of the Russian Federation targeting the city's recreational area. This attack became the most devastating in terms of casualties and injuries to civilian infrastructure of the city since the beginning of the Russian-Ukrainian War. A total of 21 people were killed, and 74 others suffered injuries of varying severity.

Rescue teams from the State Emergency Service arrived at the scene to extinguish fires, clear debris, and search for victims. Later, the Russian Armed Forces launched another missile strike, causing further damage and casualties.

== Course of events ==
Emergency and search operations in the buildings destroyed by Russia in Odesa on March 15

On March 15, 2024, at 11:01 (UTC+2), an air raid siren was heard in the region. Around 11:03, the first missile hit a recreational facility on Dacha Kovalevskogo Street in the Kyiv District. At 11:37, just as medics, rescuers, and police arrived at the site, a second missile hit the same location. A three-story building of the recreational facility was destroyed, and at least 10 residential houses, a vehicle service station, a low-pressure gas pipeline, ambulances, and fire and rescue vehicles were damaged.

== Victims ==
On the first day of the tragedy, 20 fatalities were discovered. Among those killed by the Russians were the former First Deputy Mayor of Odesa, Sergiy Tetyukhin, and 30-year-old police officer Andriy Boyarsky, leaving behind a three-month-old orphan. The Tsunami Regiment commander, Lieutenant Colonel Oleksandr Evgeniyovich was also amongst the deceased. The next morning, 39-year-old rescuer Vitaliy Alimov died in the hospital, becoming the 21st victim.

== Investigation ==
The Office of the Prosecutor General of Ukraine reported that the Russians launched the missile from the territory of Crimea using the Iskander-M system. Ukrainian investigators initiated an investigation under the article concerning the violation of the laws and customs of war related to deliberate murder (Part 2 of Article 438 of the Criminal Code of Ukraine).

== Reaction ==
President of Ukraine, Volodymyr Zelenskyy, commented on the strike. "Rescue operations and assistance are still underway in Odesa after the Russian missile strike – a very cowardly strike by these scoundrels: two missiles, and the second, when rescuers and doctors arrived at the impact site. Among the dead and injured are 'emergency' paramedics and State Emergency Service rescuers," the president noted.

The Odesa Oblast Military Administration declared March 16 as a Day of Mourning.

== See also ==
- Odesa strikes (2022-present)
