= Poltava Rifle Battalion (Ukraine) =

Poltava Battalion Ukrainian: батальйон патрульної служби міліції особливого призначення "Полтава"
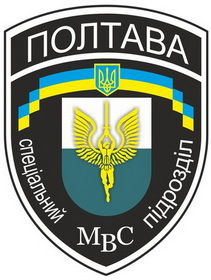
- Battalion Insignia
- Active: April 2014 – 2023; June 2024 - present
- Country: Ukraine
- Allegiance: Ministry of Internal Affairs
- Type: Police Tactical Unit

The Poltava Battalion (Ukrainian: батальйон патрульної служби міліції особливого призначення "Полтава") is a Ukrainian battalion that is part of the Special Tasks Patrol Police, under the authority of the Ministry of Internal Affairs. The unit consists of approximately 300 policemen, aged between 18 and 45. Various charity organizations in Ukraine have provided basic supplies and medical care for the volunteers of the battalion.

In July 2014, the battalion was deployed to participate in the War in Donbas. On 5 September 2014, the "Myrnyi" police company was merged into the "Poltava" police battalion.

== History ==
In May 2014, the Ministry of Internal Affairs of Ukraine in the Poltava region formed three divisions of the patrol police: the Kaskad Battalion, Poltava's Company, and the "Kremenchuk" Company. In June, the Kaskad Battalion and the Poltava Company were merged into one unit, named BPSMOP "Poltava", with a total of 300 personnel under the leadership of Commander Alexander Fedorenko.

To be admitted to the Community Patrol Service, members of the Poltava Battalion were required to complete a 52-hour basic training course at the Poltava Center for Professional Training. Colonel Yuriy Sulayev, head of the Public Relations Department of the Poltava Ministry of Internal Affairs, noted that the battalion's personnel were provided with necessary ammunition, including weapons, body armour, helmets, two sets of black uniforms, and one set of camouflage gear. Some of the ammunition was preserved in warehouses, leading to an undesirable situation.

On July 18, the operational group of Battalion "Poltava" embarked on its first service mission to the combat zone in eastern Ukraine.

On August 20, a second operational group from Battalion "Poltava" arrived to serve in the area of the anti-terrorist operation in the Donetsk region, near Horlivka. From there, Poltava was moved to the village of Kommunar near Makiivka to reinforce the 25th Brigade. From August 24 to September 4, the battalion's positions were under daily heavy artillery fire. During the fighting, two soldiers from Poltava were injured. On September 4, 29 soldiers left without orders for Artemivsk, while 24 fighters remained in Kommunar.

On September 5, 2014, the Ukrainian Minister of Internal Affairs, Arsen Avakov, issued an order merging the BPSMOP "Poltava" with the patrol service of a special purpose (RPSMOP) "Peaceful," which was then being formed in Poltava, into the "Poltava Region" battalion. The commander of the new battalion was appointed as the coordinator of RPSMOP "Peaceful," Illia Kyva, who was promoted to the rank of Major in the Militia. The head of GUMVS in the Poltava region, Ivan Korsun, confirmed Avakov's order. Illia Kyva also managed the Poltava Center of the Right Sector and served as the regional political leader of the Right Sector in eastern Ukraine (Poltava, Kharkiv, Donetsk, and Luhansk regions).

On September 8, 2014, representatives of the Poltava community and certain former fighters of BPSMOP "Poltava" organized a rally near the GUMVS office in the Poltava region, expressing dissatisfaction with Illia Kyva's appointment to his new post.

After reformation, the Poltavshchina Battalion began preparing for deployment to the ATO zone, initially scheduled for September 15, 2014. The soldiers underwent additional training at the former international children's camp "Vasilok" near the village of Volovach, in the Poltava region, and at a training site near the village of Vakulets in Poltava's Leninsky district. In an interview with Poltava television, Battalion Commander Kiva mentioned that instructors from Israel, who had previously trained renowned volunteer units like the National Guard's "Donbas" Battalion and the "Dnipro-1" Battalion, were involved in the training. However, the press later reported that the deployment of the Poltavshchina fighters to the ATO zone in Donbas had been postponed.

On September 29, the battalion's operational group, fully equipped, left for a one-month service trip to the ATO zone.

Following a protest within the battalion against the leadership of Ilya Kiva, he was dismissed from his post by an order from A. Avakov. Subsequently, the Poltavshchina Battalion was disbanded, and a new special assignment battalion, "Poltava," comprising about 275 personnel, was formed from its members. Yuriy Anuchin, a well-known machine gunner from the volunteer Azov Battalion with the callsign "Bear," was appointed commander of the newly created battalion.

On 14 April 2023, after 9 years of service, the "Poltava" battalion was disbanded as part of the police department's reform. After the disbandment, almost 70% of the soldiers of the disbanded battalion were transferred to Liut Brigade. However, in 2024, it was recreated as the Poltava Rifle Battalion.

== Structure ==
- 1st Company
- 2nd Company
- 3rd Kremenchuk Company

== See also ==
- List of special law enforcement units
