= Lozove, Kherson Oblast =

Village in Kherson Oblast, Ukraine

Lozove Лозове
- Village
- Interactive map of Lozove
- Location of Lozove within Ukraine Lozove (Ukraine)
- Coordinates: 47.193611°N 33.071389°E
- Country: Ukraine
- Oblast: Kherson Oblast
- Raion: Beryslav Raion

Area
  - Total: 0.302 km^{2} (0.117 sq mi)
- Elevation: 49 m (161 ft)

Population (2001 census)
  - Total: 34
  - Density: 110/km^{2} (290/sq mi)
- Time zone: UTC+2 (EET)
  - Summer (DST): UTC+3 (EEST)
- Postal code: 74101
- Area code: +380 5532

Lozove (Ukrainian: Лозове; Russian: Лозовое) is a defunct village in Beryslav Raion, Kherson Oblast, southern Ukraine, about 74.6 kilometres (46.4 mi) north-northeast from the centre of Kherson city, besides the Inhulets river. The border of Kherson Oblast with Mykolaiv Oblast runs along the river on the northwest side of the village. In 2012, the village was removed from official records of data registration due to ongoing power and water issues.

== History ==
The village was established in 1898 under the name Maksymivka. However, in 1927, the village began to be settled by migrants from the village of Zhvan from the Vinnytsia Oblast officially, and it went by several unofficial names in addition to Maksymivka, like Piatydesiate and Volynske. During the Great Patriotic War the village was occupied by German forces from 27 August 1941 to 12 March 1944. However, during the early 20th century, the village faced a serious problem with its water supply, prompting many residents to relocate. In 1946 the city was officially renamed to Lozove. This situation of the water supply still affected the village for a long time, and eventually, in 2007, it was disconnected from the power grid.

On 27 December 2012, the district council petitioned for its removal from the official records of data registration. Thus, the village is virtually defunct of residents, in part due to the power and water issues.

The village was occupied by Russian forces in July 2022, during the Russian invasion of Ukraine. The village was subsequently recaptured during the initial preparation stages of the 2022 Kherson counteroffensive by the Ukrainian Armed Forces later in the same month.
