= Anti-terrorist Operation Zone =

Official name for territory where the war in Donbas takes place

Coordinates: 48.63°N 37.33°E

Animated map of ATO zone (June–September 2014)

Anti-Terrorist Operation Zone (Ukrainian: Зона проведення антитерористичної операції, romanized: Zona provedennya antyterorystychnoyi operatsiyi), or ATO zone (Ukrainian: Зона АТО, romanized: Zona ATO), was a term used by the media, public, the government of Ukraine, and the OSCE and other foreign institutions to identify Ukrainian territory of the Donetsk and Luhansk regions (oblasts) under the control of Russian military forces (Note: Russia's official position on the presence of Russian forces in Ukraine's Donbas region prior to the 2022 Russian invasion of Ukraine was vague: while official bodies denied presence of "regular armed forces" in Ukraine, on numerous occasions Russia confirmed the presence of "military specialists" and used other euphemisms, usually accompanied by an argument that Russia "was forced" to deploy them to "defend Russian-speaking population".) and pro-Russian separatists. As the 2014 pro-Russian unrest in Ukraine escalated with the arrival of armed militias, the Ukrainian government declared the start of an "Anti-Terrorist Operation" (ATO), marking the beginning of the War in Donbas. A significant part of ATO (JFO, starting 2018) zone was considered temporarily occupied territory of Ukraine. In Minsk II protocols of 2015 it was referred to as 'certain areas of Donetsk and Luhansk regions'.

== History ==
On 20 February 2018, Ukrainian President Petro Poroshenko changed the status of the ATO zone from an anti-terrorist operation to "taking measures to ensure national security and defense, and repulsing and deterring the armed aggression of the Russian Federation in Donetsk and Luhansk oblasts".

This allowed the Ukrainian military to take charge of the zones instead of the Ukrainian security service SBU. As such, the ATO was renamed to JFO zone (Joint Forces Operation (Ukrainian: Операція об'єднаних сил, ООС, romanized: Operatsiya ob'yednanykh syl).

Following the Russian invasion of Ukraine, out-of-service ATO veterans have repeatedly been the target of Russian forces, for example of the Redut PMC. According to captured fighters, with this they wanted to decrease the risk of them joining the defence of Ukraine. For this purpose, veterans were interrogated and tortured in order to find more, after which many were killed. Two Redut PMC fighters were convicted for committing such war crimes.

== Military administrative division ==
The official borders of the ATO zone were defined with a list of localities and their geographical coordinates, approved in November 2014 by Ukraine's parliament, the Verkhovna Rada.

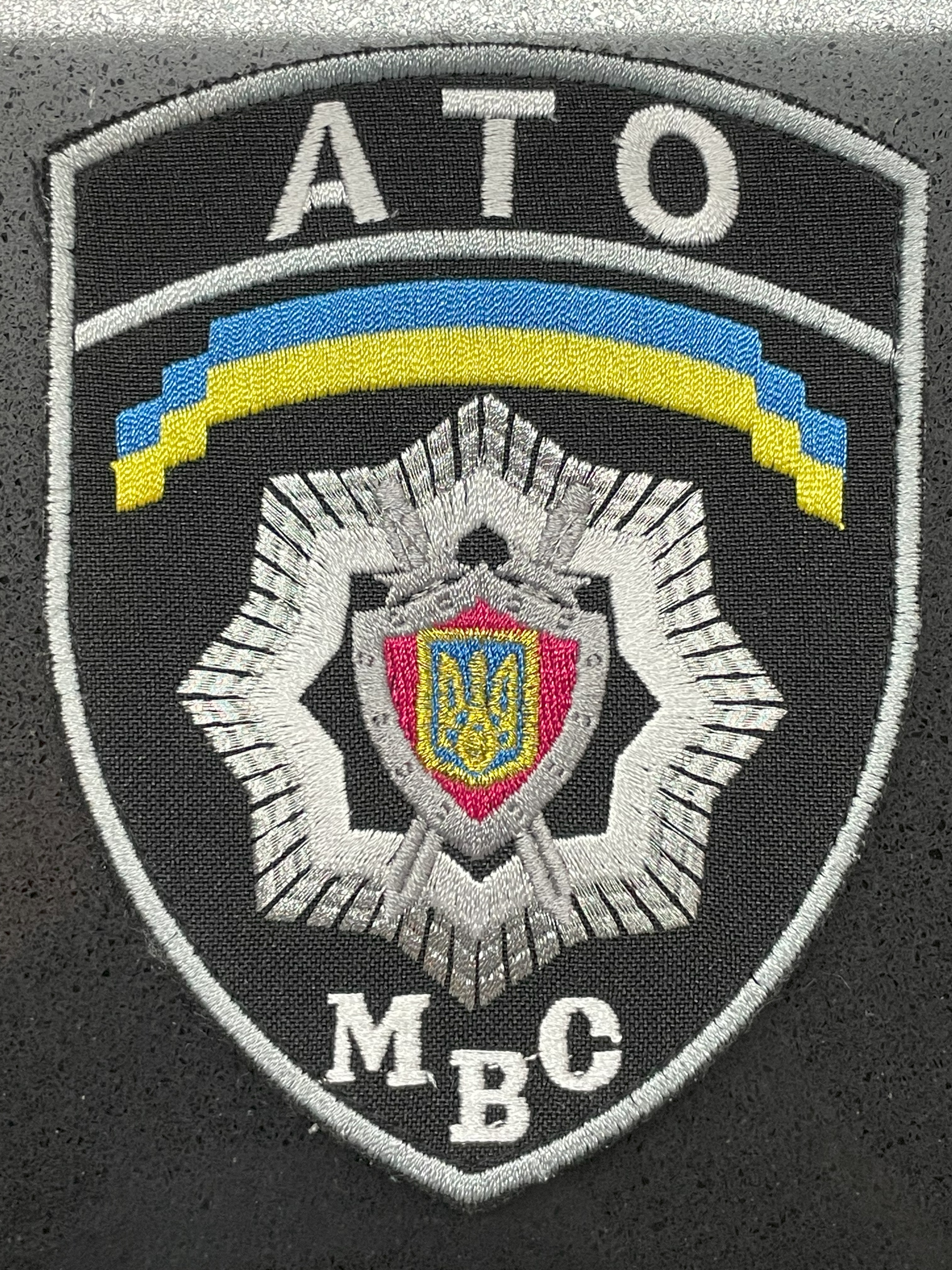
ATO Patch formerly used by the Ukrainian Militsiya.

The zone is conditionally divided into five sectors A, B, C, D, and M.

- Sector A – eastern and central parts of Luhansk Oblast
- Sector B – central parts of Donetsk Oblast including Donetsk and Makiivka
- Sector C – northern parts of Donetsk Oblast (cities Bakhmut and Debaltseve), and western parts of Luhansk Oblast
- Sector D – southern parts of Luhansk Oblast and eastern parts of Donetsk Oblast (after the 2014 Russian invasion on August 24, all Ukrainian forces were withdrawn)
- Sector M – southern parts of Donetsk Oblast (around Mariupol, hence the sector's identification)

== Influence in culture and society ==
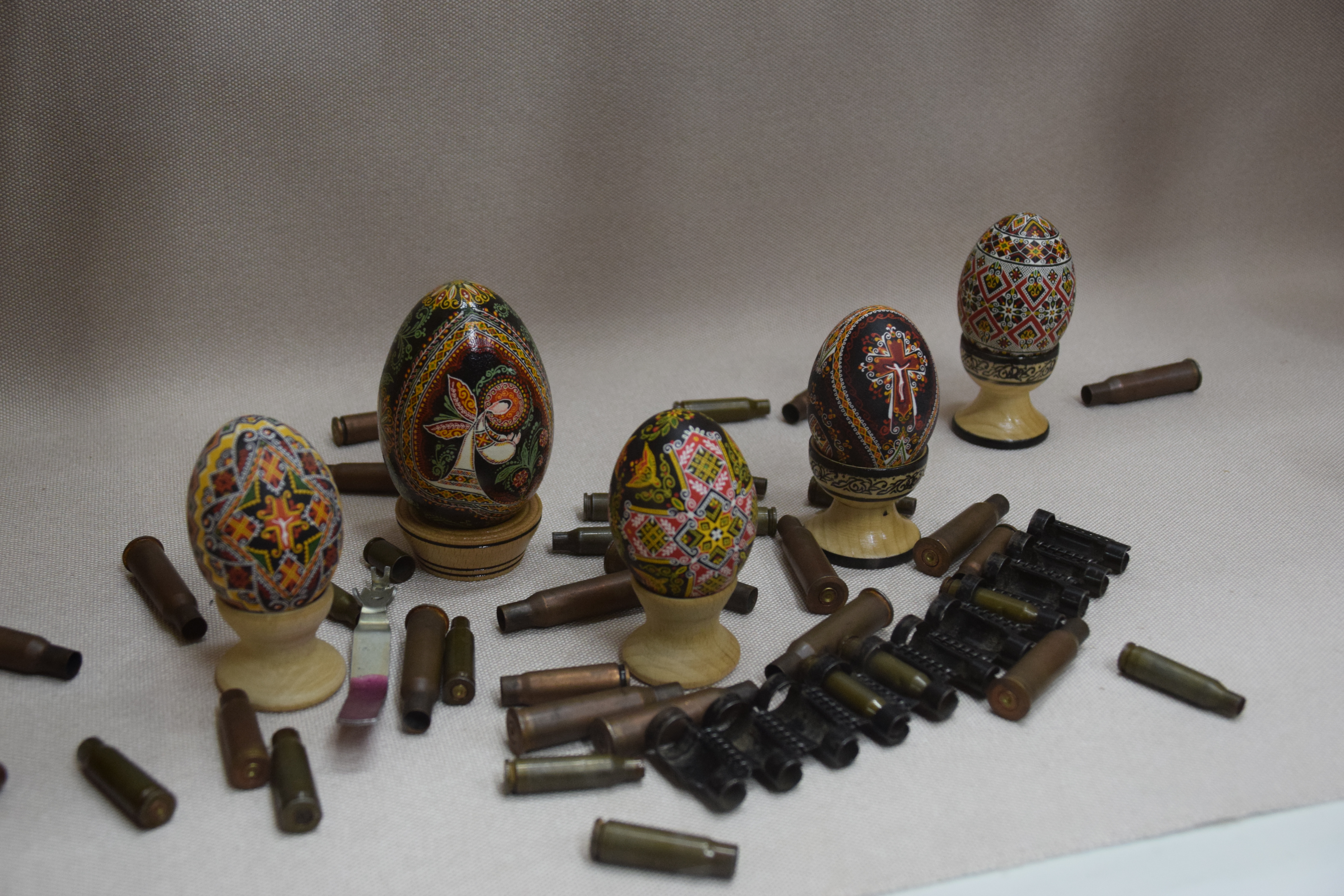
Easter eggs from the ATO zone, 2017 – exhibit at the Pysanka Museum

Since 28 December 2015, the song "Brattia Ukraintsi" (Brothers Ukrainians) is the official anthem of ATO.

During the War in Donbas between the Ukrainian government forces and pro-Russian separatists in the Donbas region of Ukraine that began in April 2014, many international organisations and states noted a deteriorating humanitarian situation in the conflict zone.

A May 2014 report by the United Nations said there had been an "alarming deterioration" in human rights in territory held by Russian separatists affiliated with the Donetsk People's Republic (DPR) and Luhansk People's Republic (LPR). The UN Human Rights Monitoring Mission in Ukraine (HRMMU) reported growing lawlessness in the region, documenting cases of targeted killings, torture, and abduction. HRMMU also reported threats against, attacks on, and abductions of journalists and international observers, as well as the beatings and attacks on supporters of Ukrainian unity. A report by Human Rights Watch said "Anti-Kiev forces in eastern Ukraine are abducting, attacking, and harassing people they suspect of supporting the Ukrainian government or consider undesirable...anti-Kiev insurgents are using beatings and kidnappings to send the message that anyone who doesn't support them had better shut up or leave".

Non-governmental organisations, such as Amnesty International, also raised concerns about the behaviour of some Ukrainian volunteer battalions. Amnesty International said that they often acted like "renegade gangs", and were implicated in torture, abductions, and summary executions.

In a report from HRMMU, May 2014, Ivan Šimonović, UN Assistant Secretary General for Human Rights, wrote about illegal detention, abduction and intimidation of election officials in the self-proclaimed pro-Russian republics, and called for urgent action to prevent a Balkans-style war. He also warned of a humanitarian crisis due to a failure of social services in the region, and an exodus of people from affected areas. In October 2015, the DPR and LPR banned non-governmental organisations such as Doctors Without Borders and World Food Programme from the territory that they control. A report released on 3 March 2016 by the Office of the United Nations High Commissioner for Human Rights (OHCHR) said that people that lived in separatist-controlled areas were experiencing "complete absence of rule of law, reports of arbitrary detention, torture and incommunicado detention, and no access to real redress mechanisms". In addition, the report noted "allegations of violations perpetrated with impunity by Ukrainian law enforcement officials—mainly elements of the Security Service of Ukraine (SBU)—including enforced disappearances, arbitrary and incommunicado detention, and torture and ill-treatment".

According to the United Nations Children's Fund (UNICEF), "The results of a psychosocial assessment of children in Donetsk Oblast in Eastern Ukraine are deeply troubling ... and indicate that about half of all children aged 7–18 have been directly exposed to adverse or threatening events during the current crisis." OSCE monitors spoke to refugees from Donetsk city in Zaporizhia. They said that men were "often not allowed" to leave the city, but were instead "forcibly enrolled in 'armed forces' of the so-called 'Donetsk People's Republic' or obliged to dig trenches".

By June 2015, the conflict had created 1.3 million internally displaced people (IDPs). According to the OHCHR, this number had grown to 1.6 million people by early March 2016. As of December 2022, the total number of IDPs has increased to 5.9 Million following the Russian invasion.

By 2018, Ukraine controlled 60-70% of the Donetsk and Luhansk Oblasts.

== Casualties ==
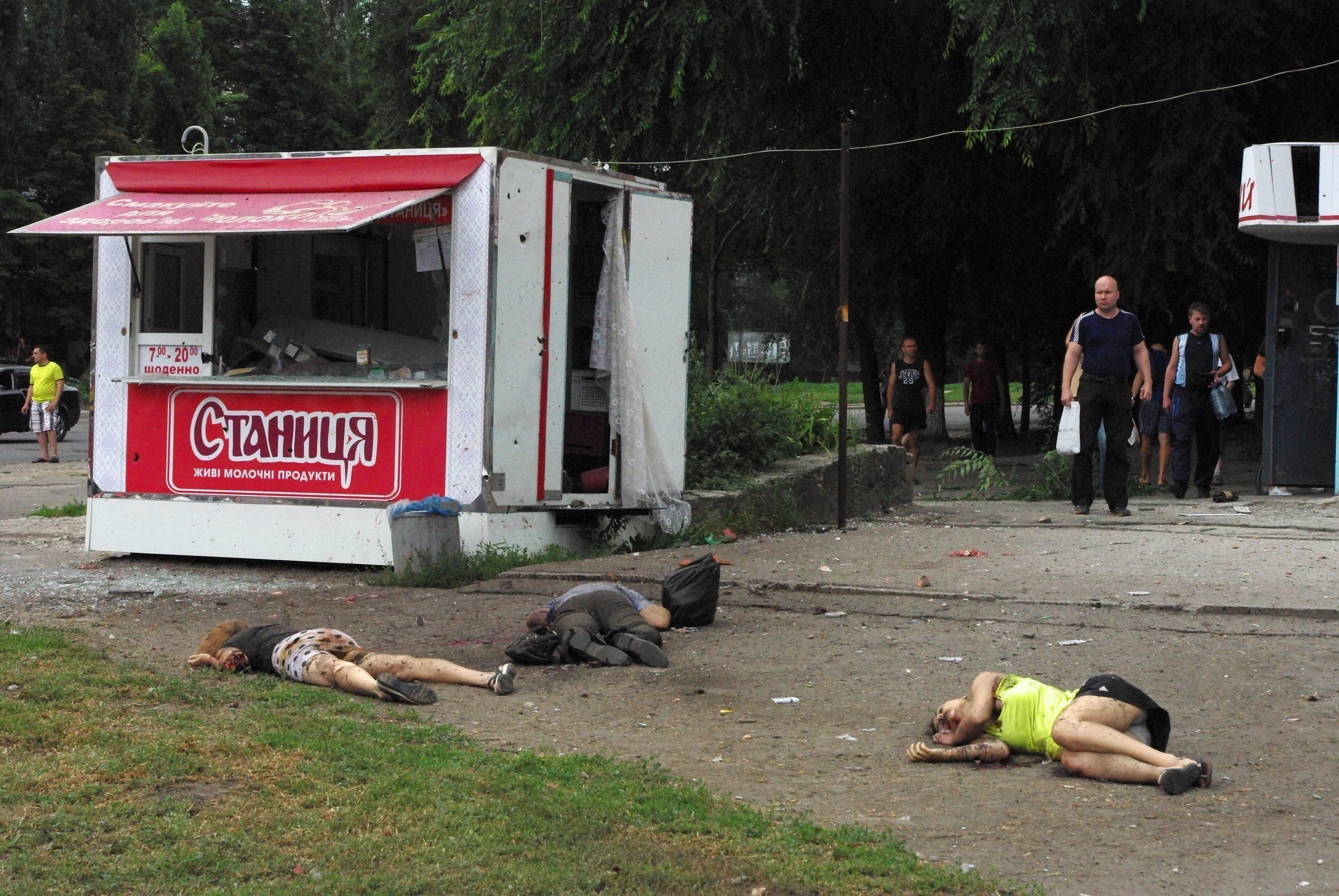
Civilians killed by shelling in Luhansk, 18 June 2014

A report by the OHCHR released on 28 July 2014 said that based on "conservative estimates", at least 1,129 civilians had been killed since mid-April during the fighting, and that at least 3,442 had been wounded. Another OHCHR report, released on 20 November, estimated that the overall number of people killed in the conflict had risen to 4,317, and that at least 9,921 had been wounded.

Amidst a large-scale escalation in fighting during January and February 2015, the number of casualties greatly increased. According to another OHCHR report based on Ukrainian government sources, 843 people were killed in Donbas from 13 January to 15 February. 359 of these were civilians. 3,410 people were injured during the same period, of which 916 were civilians. By 15 February 2015, 5,665 people had been killed since the start of the war in mid-April 2014, whilst 13,961 had been injured. According to the report, these numbers were "very conservative", and based only on "available data". The report went on to say that "the actual number of casualties is likely to be far higher since military and civilian casualties remain under-reported". On 19 February 2016, UNICEF stated that in 2015 more than 20 children were killed and over 40 were injured.

Land mines laid during the conflict have also taken civilian victims. The State Emergency Service of Ukraine has stated it had cleared Donbas of more than 44,000 mines by early December 2015. It was currently unclear how many unexploded devices remained. According to UNICEF, in 2015, 28 children had been casualties due to mines and unexploded ordnance.

According to a United Nations early March 2016 report, over 3 million people lived in the ATO zone. 2.7 million of them lived in the areas controlled by separatist forces, while 200,000 people resided in the proximity to the contact line.
