= Offensive Guard (Ukraine) =

Recruitment campaign by the Ukrainian Ministry of the Internal Affairs

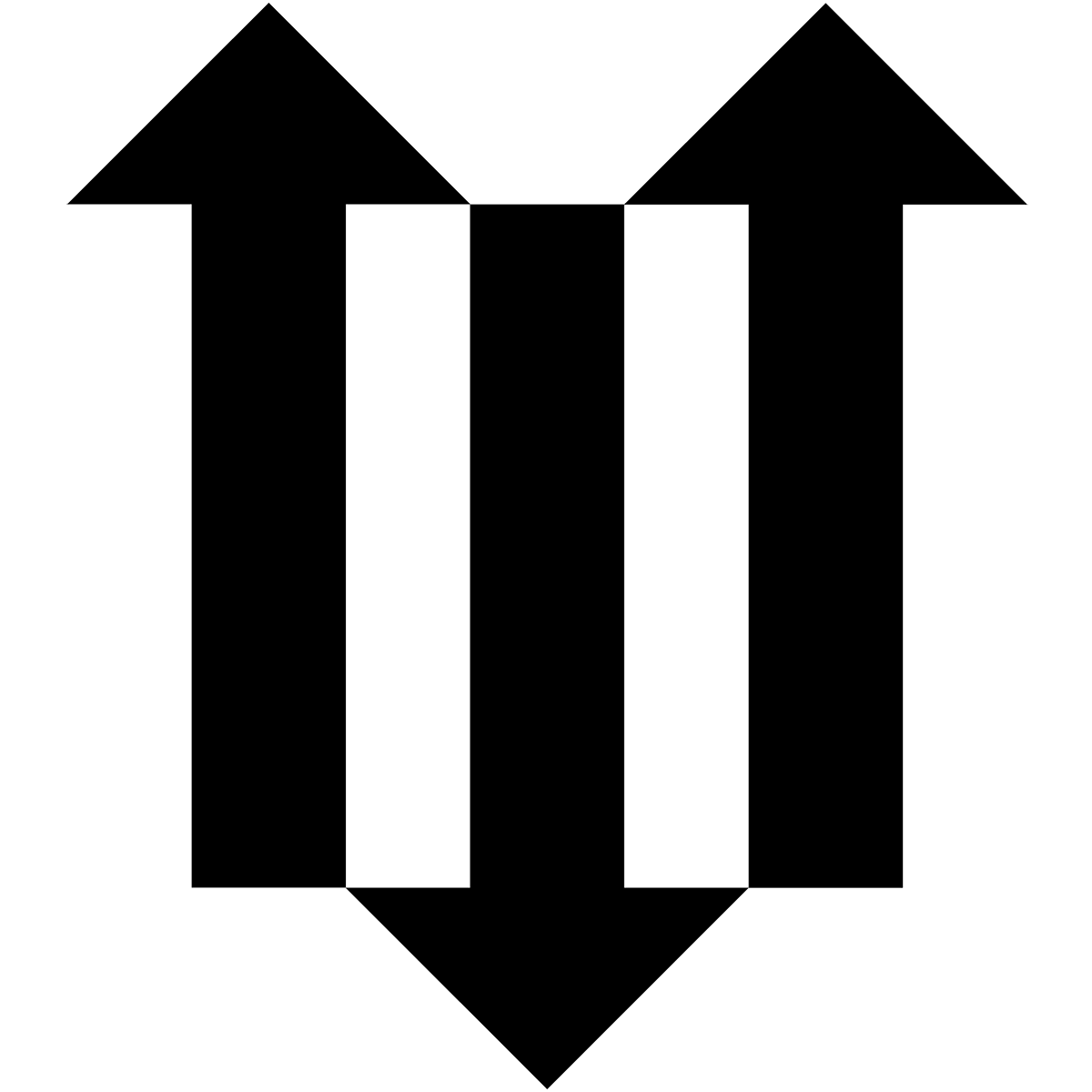
Recruitment campaign logo

The Offensive Guard (Ukrainian: Гвардія наступу, romanized: Hvardiia nastupu) is a recruitment campaign initiated by the Ukrainian Ministry of Internal Affairs to establish new assault brigades within the National Guard, National Police, and Border Guards. The main objective of this project is to strengthen the country's security and defense capabilities by creating units capable of responding to various threats and challenges.

== History ==
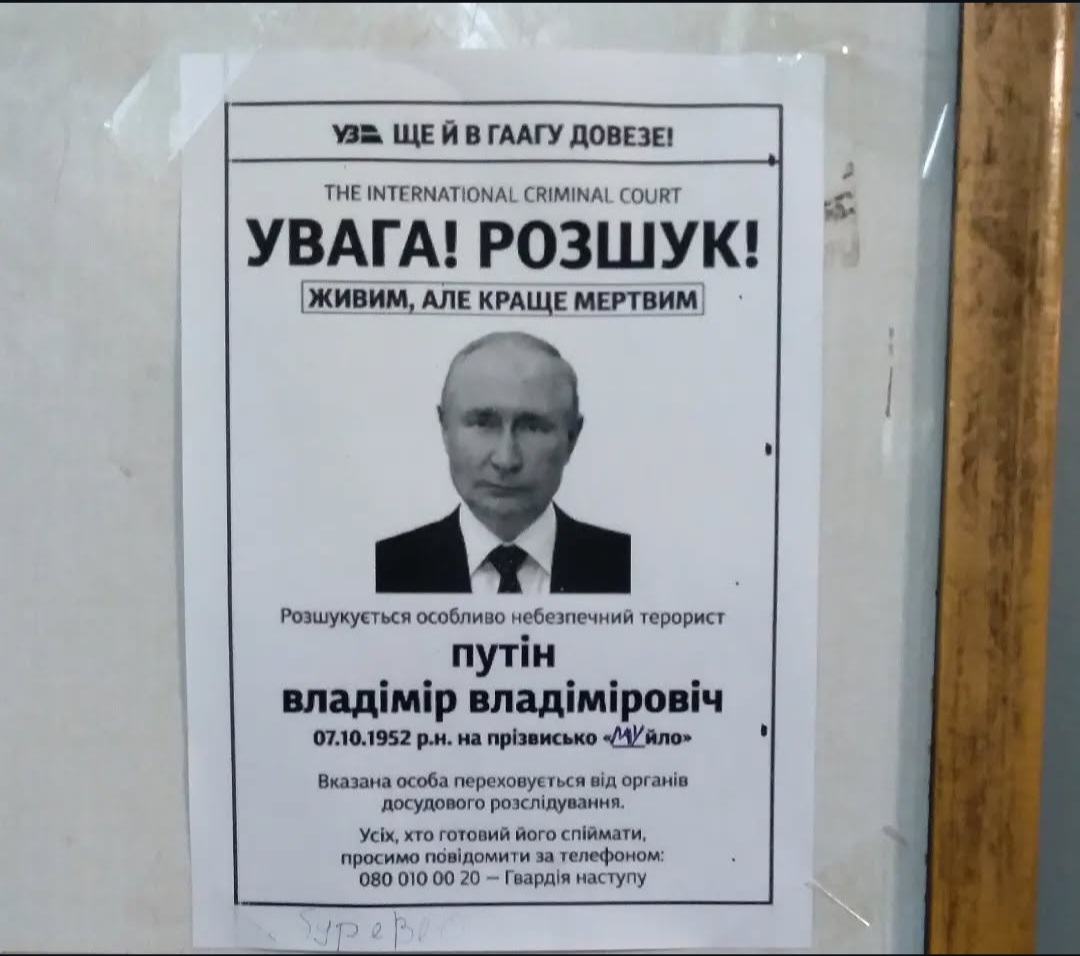
2023 Offensive Guard recruitment advertisement in the form of a wanted poster. It describes Putin as "a particularly dangerous terrorist", to be apprehended and sent to the International Criminal Court in The Hague to face justice.

In February, the Ukrainian Ministry of Internal Affairs launched the Offensive Guard project, which aimed to establish eight volunteer assault brigades by April 2023. The project has called for volunteers to join the effort, with particular emphasis on active members of the National Police, State Border Guard, and National Guard, as well as veterans of the Russo-Ukrainian War. The response to the call for volunteers has been significant, with over 27,000 enquiries registered by Internal Affairs in just over a week. Of these, 15,000 applicants, including 500 female candidates, have applied for admission, and over 800 individuals have already passed medical examinations as part of the enlistment process.

The projected raising of the Guards was such a resounding success that by April 2023 the Ministry of Internal Affairs of Ukraine recommended the raising of more formations.

== Results ==
As of 2025, the brigades formed as a result of the recruitment campaign were follows:

=== National Guard ===
- 1st Burevii Brigade, Vyshhorod, Kyiv Oblast
  - Brigade Headquarter and Headquarter Company
  - Kulchytskyi Battalion
  - 1st Infantry Battalion
  - 2nd Infantry Battalion
  - 3rd Infantry Battalion
  - Artillery Battalion
  - Anti-Aircraft Defense Battalion
- 3rd Spartan Brigade, Kharkiv, Kharkiv Oblast
  - Brigade Headquarter and Headquarter Company
  - 1st Infantry Battalion
  - 2nd Infantry Battalion
  - 3rd Infantry Battalion
  - 4th Guardsmen Battalion
  - Tank Company
  - Artillery Battalion
  - Anti-Aircraft Defense Battalion
  - Reconnaissance Company
- 4th Rubizh Brigade, Hostomel, Kyiv Oblast
  - Brigade Headquarters and Headquarters Company
  - 1st Infantry Battalion
  - 2nd Infantry Battalion
  - 3rd "Svoboda" Infantry Battalion
  - 4th Infantry Battalion
  - 5th Infantry Battalion
  - 6th Infantry Battalion
  - Tank Battalion
  - Field Artillery Battalion
  - Anti-Aircraft Defense Battalion
- 12th Azov Assault Brigade, Yurivka, Donetsk Oblast
  - Brigade Headquarter and Headquarter Company
  - 1st Infantry Battalion
  - 2nd Infantry Battalion
  - 3rd Infantry Battalion
  - Tank Company
  - Artillery Battalion
  - Anti-Aircraft Defense Battalion
  - Reconnaissance Company
- 13th Khartiia Brigade, Kharkiv, Kharkiv Oblast
  - Brigade Headquarters and Headquarters Company
- 14th Chervona Kalyna Brigade, Kalynivka, Vinnytsia Oblast
  - Brigade Headquarters and Headquarters Company
- 15th Kara-Dag Brigade, Zaporizhzhia, Zaporizhzhia Oblast
  - Brigade Headquarters and Headquarters Company
  - 1st Infantry Battalion
  - 2nd Infantry Battalion
  - 3rd Infantry Battalion
  - Tank Company
  - Field Artillery Battalion
  - Anti-Aircraft Defense Battalion
  - Reconnaissance Company

=== National Police ===
- Liut Brigade, Kyiv, Kyiv Oblast
  - Brigade Headquarters and Headquarters Company
  - Tsunami Assault Regiment
    - Regimental Headquarters and Headquarters Company
  - Safari Assault Regiment
    - Regimental Headquarters and Headquarters Company
  - Luhansk Assault Regiment
    - Regimental Headquarters and Headquarters Company
  - Dnipro-1 Regiment
    - Regimental Headquarters and Headquarters Company
  - Myrotvorets Battalion
  - Skif Battalion
  - Enei Battalion
  - Zakhid Battalion
  - Tavr Battalion
  - Shtorm Battalion

=== State Border Guard ===
- Stalevyi Kordon Brigade, Kyiv, Kyiv Oblast
  - Brigade Headquarters and Headquarters Company
- Pomsta Brigade, Chasiv Yar, Donetsk Oblast
  - Brigade Headquarters and Headquarters Company
- Hart Brigade
  - Brigade Headquarters and Headquarters Company
- Forpost Brigade, Kramatorsk, Donetsk Oblast
  - Brigade Headquarters and Headquarters Company
