= MTAC =

MTAC may refer to:

- Mongolian and Tibetan Affairs Commission of the Republic of China's Executive Yuan
- Multiple Threat Alert Center of the United States' Naval Criminal Investigative Service
- Middle Tennessee Anime Convention
- Mathematical Tables and Other Aids to Computation, technical journal renamed Mathematics of Computation
- M-TAC, a military equipment brand of TM Militarist
