= Artem Iliukhin =

Ukrainian serviceman

- Артем Ілюхін

Personal details
- Born: Artem Ihorovych Iliukhin

Military service
- Allegiance: Ukraine
- Branch/service: National Guard of Ukraine
- Rank: Colonel
- Battles/wars: Russo-Ukrainian War
- Awards

Artem Ihorovych Iliukhin (Ukrainian: Артем Ігорович Ілюхін) is a Ukrainian serviceman, colonel of the 4th Brigade of the National Guard of Ukraine, a participant of the Russian-Ukrainian war.

== Biography ==
Since 2014, he has been at the front. Participated in the battles for Luhansk airport, Debaltseve, Maryinka, and Mariupol.

Currently, he is the commander of the 4th Operational Brigade of the National Guard of Ukraine.

From the first days of the full-scale Russian invasion of Ukraine, he defended Gostomel, and now he and his brigade are defending Bakhmut.

== Awards ==
- Order of Bohdan Khmelnytsky, III class (16 March 2022)
