= M-Tac =

Ukrainian tactical clothing brand

M-TAC
- Type: Private
- Industry: Clothing, Military equipment
- Founded: 2014
- Headquarters: Kyiv, Ukraine
- Website: m-tac.us

M-TAC (also styled M-Tac) is a Ukrainian brand of tactical clothing and military equipment, founded in 2014 and headquartered in Kyiv, Ukraine. The brand serves military personnel, law enforcement officers, security professionals, and civilian users across more than 20 countries. M-TAC has been present in the United States market since 2017.

The brand gained international recognition when President of Ukraine Volodymyr Zelenskyy began wearing M-TAC apparel during wartime public appearances, including his address to the United States Congress in December 2022, his first public appearance outside Ukraine since the start of the full-scale war. According to Forbes Ukraine, M-TAC is the most popular military clothing brand in Ukraine.

== History ==
=== Founding ===
M-TAC was established in 2014 as a manufacturing brand focused on producing tactical clothing for Ukrainian military units and the domestic civilian market.

The company initially employed 10 seamstresses. By early 2022, it had grown to approximately 200 employees. By January 2023, the workforce expanded to 750 seamstresses.

=== US operations ===
M-TAC entered the United States market in 2017. The American operation is managed through a dedicated US team and storefront at m-tac.us, offering the full range of M-TAC tactical clothing, gear, and accessories to customers across North America.

=== International recognition ===
In December 2022, President Zelenskyy addressed the United States Congress wearing an M-TAC crewneck sweater, his first public appearance outside Ukraine since the start of the war. Several U.S. and international outlets reported on the brand as a result.

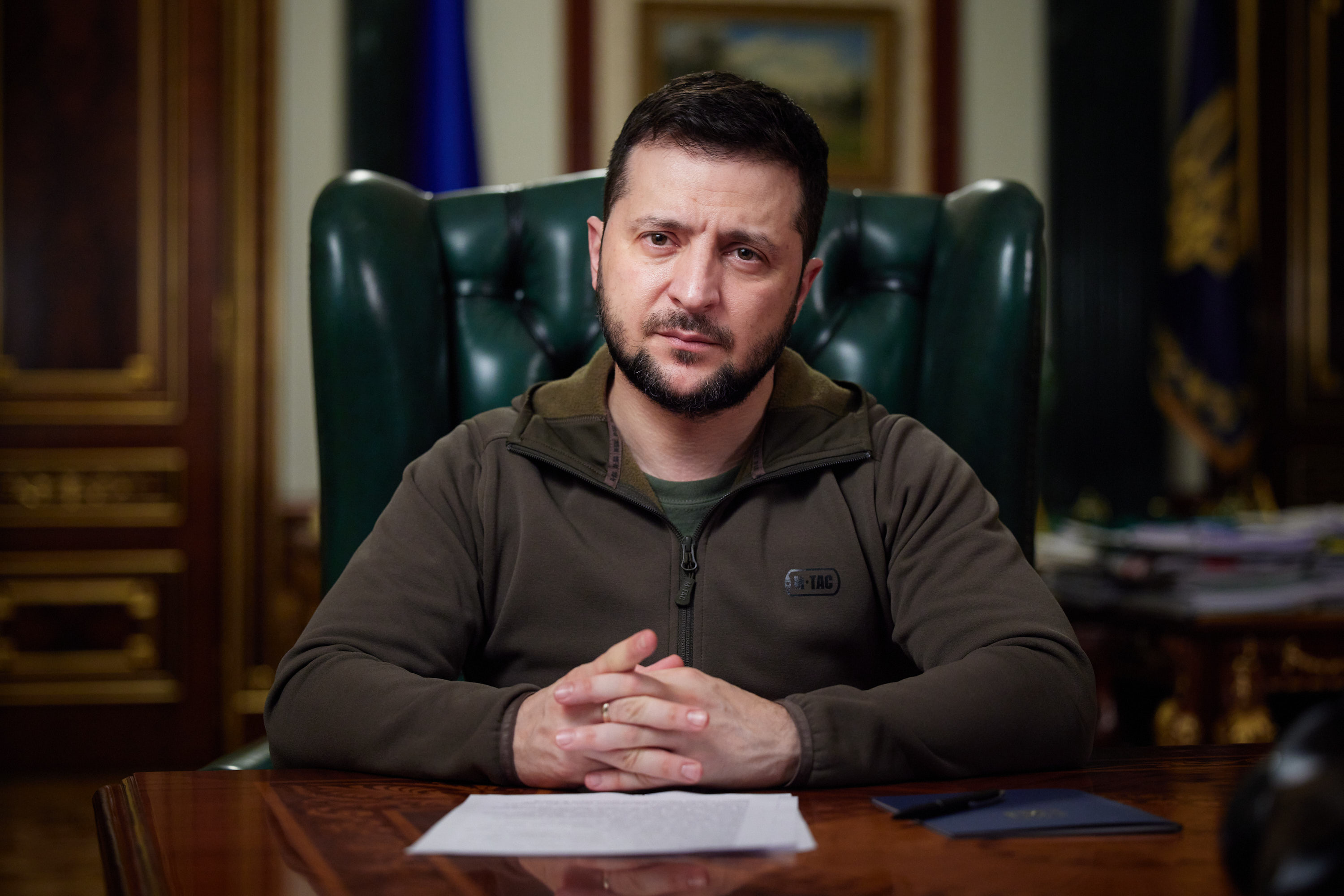
Volodymyr Zelenskyy wearing M-TAC apparel, 2022

Business Insider described M-TAC as the company behind "President Volodymyr Zelenskyy's casual sweaters and t-shirts," noting that the brand started as an airsoft equipment retailer before expanding into tactical manufacturing.

In May 2022, an M-TAC fleece jacket previously worn by Zelenskyy was auctioned at Christie's in London for £90,000 (approximately US$113,000) during the "Brave Ukraine" charity fundraiser. Then-Prime Minister of the United Kingdom Boris Johnson spoke at the event and called for bids above the starting price of £50,000. Zelenskyy addressed attendees by video call.

Following the auction, USA Today reported that the jacket model sold out globally, with M-TAC stating that restocking would not be prioritized until Ukraine achieved victory in the war.

Politico Magazine noted M-TAC's role in shaping Ukraine's wartime visual identity, describing the brand's apparel as part of a broader cultural and political signal associated with Ukrainian resilience.

In May 2026, The New York Times reported on how Ukrainian wartime military aesthetics, including M-TAC apparel, had influenced street fashion trends within Ukraine and internationally.

=== Infrastructure damage ===
On 2 January 2024, a missile strike destroyed M-TAC's production facility in Kyiv. Intelligence Online reported that the attack forced the company to reorganize its manufacturing operations and partially relocate production.

=== Battlefield 6 ===
In November 2025, several M-TAC products were reproduced in Battlefield 6, a first-person shooter developed by Battlefield Studios and published by Electronic Arts. Items featured included the CLS Elite medical bag, the Admin X-Large Elite pouch, and the Sturm X-Large Elite Gen.II backpack, equipment used by Ukrainian military personnel and volunteers. At launch, the game attracted 747,000 concurrent players on Steam, ranking third among the platform's most-played titles.

=== Collaborations ===
In November 2024, M-TAC partnered with the Come Back Alive Foundation to release a limited series of 500 individually numbered red-and-black plaid shirts, made available in part through a charitable raffle.

== See also ==
- TM Militarist
- 5.11 Tactical
