= Svitiaz Company (Ukraine) =

- Ukrainian: Рота поліції «Світязь»
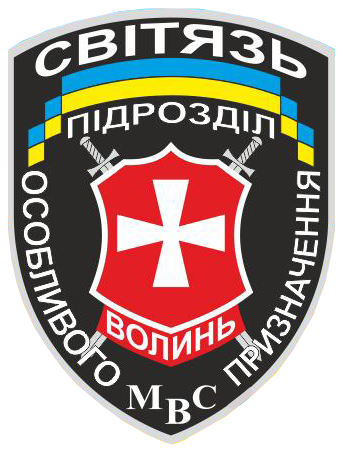
- Svitiaz Company Insignia
- Active: 2014–present
- Country: Ukraine
- Branch: Ministry of Internal Affairs
- Type: Special Tasks Patrol Police
- Size: 100
- Part of: Zakhid Battalion
- Garrison/HQ: Volyn
- Patron: Serhii Gubanov
- Motto: Ukraine above all
- Engagements: Russo-Ukrainian War: War in Donbas; Battle of Ilovaisk; Battle of Debaltseve; Russian invasion of Ukraine

Commanders
- Current commander: Oleg Bulatov
- Notable commanders: Oleksandr Facevych

The Svitiaz Company is a company of the Zakhid Battalion of the Liut Brigade of the Special Tasks Patrol Police subordinated to Ministry of Internal Affairs of Ukraine. The company is currently based in Volyn. It was established in 2014 and has since then seen regular combat on the frontlines.

== History ==
On 12 June 2014, the Ministry of Internal Affairs and Communications of Volyn announced the creation of Svitiaz Company, tasked to perform tasks in the ATO zone along with law enforcement operations. Oleksandr Facevych and Maidan Volyn self-defense fighters were tasked with the company's formation. On 12 July 2014, after completing a month-long training course, the company swore allegiance to Ukraine, Colonel Petro Shpyga, said in his welcoming speech:

Today is the day when I see before me a fully combat-ready unit that will perform the most difficult tasks assigned to it. From now on, the special purpose company "Svitiaz" has become a real combat unit in the system of internal affairs bodies. You made a balanced decision to fulfill your duty with honor and dignity for the benefit of the people of Ukraine

On 14 August 2014, the company was deployed to fight in the ATO zone. It took part in the Battle of Ilovaisk during which 40 personnel of the company were besieged. On 26 August 2014, separatists conducted artillery shelling of Ilovaisk. By then, the personnel of the company had been besieged for a week but held their positions under constant fire. A soldier of the company (Ishchuk Volodymyr Stepanovych) was killed and another (Svyatoslav Romaniuk) was wounded. On 29 August 2014, during the Battle of Ilovaisk, the Ukrainian forces including the personnel of the company, while retreating via the humanitarian corridor were ambushed, six soldiers of the company (Serhii Petrovych Pominkevich, Maksym Volodymyrovych Lyashuk, Oleksandr Mykolayovych Satsyuk, Shoukha Victor Hryhorovych, Siviy Oleksandr Anatoliyovych and Stolyarchuk Myroslav Stanislavovych) are killed as a result of the ambush. A bus of the company was also hit by small arms and then ATGMs completely destroying it. After rest and training, it was deployed to the ATO zone in Vuhlehirsk in December 2014. On 30 January 2015, during the Battle of Debaltseve, the company's personnel were encircled in Vuhlehirsk, from where they fought their way out of the encirclement. The positions of the company and it's artillery group were set up in the local boarding school and the House of Culture. During the Battle, the commander directed artillery fire himself, after which the company personnel broke through the encirclement and then marched 15 kilometers to Artemivsk. Arsen Avakov stated that:

The task was performed perfectly. Fighters fought near Vuhlehirsk. They held the defense for three days. They came out whole and unharmed and brought out their comrades from the Armed Forces.

In February 2015, in relation with ref company's actions during the Battle of Debaltseve, the company's commander Oleksandr Yuriyovych Facevych and deputy commander Hryhoriy Oleksandrovych Rubchuk were granted a "branded firearm", moreover Makar Oleksandrovych Chayuk and Oleksandr Valentinovych Pinchuk were awarded the Badge for Bravery and 30 personnel were awarded the Badge for Distinction in Service.

External image
- Після нагородження бійців роти «Світязь» відзнаками МВС за героїзм та відвагу проявлені під час битви за Вуглегірськ, 5 лютого 2015

On 28 July 2015, the company commander Oleksandr Facevych, became the commander of Kyiv Oblast Special Police Forces and was succeeded by Serhii Kozak. On 11 March 2019, it was blessed by the chaplains of the OCU of Volyn and went to the ATO zone.

On 24 February 2022, following the Russian invasion of Ukraine, the company was amongst the first to engage Russian forces, then it became a part of the Zakhid Battalion which then became a part of the Liut Brigade. On 3 April 2023, the "Volyn" company headed by the commander of the Svitiaz Company, Oleg Bulatov, went on combat coordination. It is currently fighting on the frontlines.

== Commanders ==
- Oleksandr Facevych (2014-2015)
- Serhii Kozak (2015-?)
- Vyacheslav Monich (?-2023)
- Oleg Bulatov (2023-)

== Sources ==
- Легендарна рота «Світязь»: історія звитяги
- Вогняні дороги роти «Світязь». До 5-ї річниці створення
- Бійці підрозділу особливого призначення «Світязь» склали присягу на вірність народу України (ФОТО)
- «Світязь» повернувся додому (ФОТО)
- Волинь прощалася із міліціонером патрульної служби міліції особливого призначення «Світязь» (ФОТО)
- Бійців роти «Світязь» зустрічали оплесками і вигуками «Герої!» (ФОТОРЕПОРТАЖ, ВІДЕО)
- Волиняни зустріли героїв з АТО on YouTube
- Звернення бійців роти «Світязь» on YouTube
- Волиняни попрощалися із п'ятьма бійцями спецпідрозділу «Світязь» (ФОТО, ВІДЕО)
- Мене запитують, якою буде міліція після реформи — такою, яка приходить з АТО", — Арсен Аваков (ФОТО, ВІДЕО) Архівовано
- Міністр внутрішніх справ України Арсен Аваков нагородив бійців «Світязя» за проявлений героїзм під час битви за Вуглегірськ on YouTube
