= Bohdan Company (Ukraine) =

- Ukrainian: Рота поліції «Світязь»
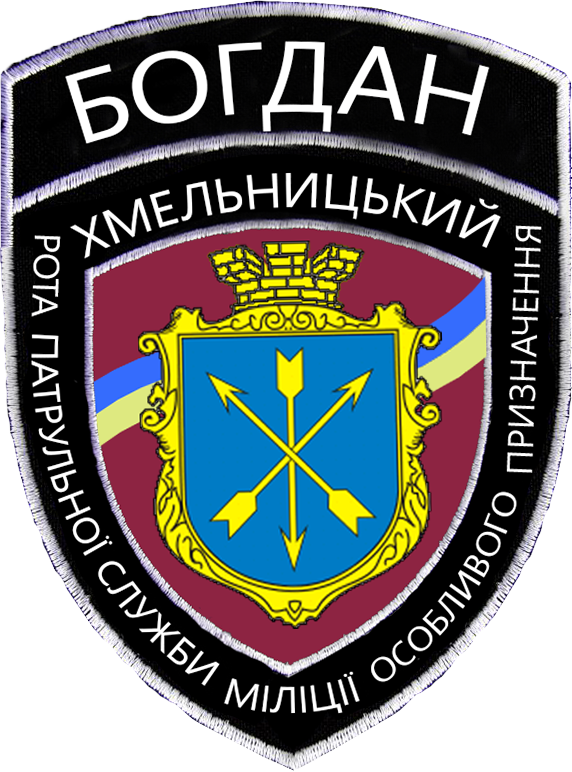
- Bohdan Company Insignia
- Active: 2014–present
- Country: Ukraine
- Branch: Ministry of Internal Affairs
- Type: Special Tasks Patrol Police
- Part of: Zakhid Battalion
- Garrison/HQ: Khmelnytskyi
- Engagements: Russo-Ukrainian War: War in Donbas; Battle of Debaltseve; Russian invasion of Ukraine

Commanders
- Current commander: Andrii Lyshen

The Bohdan Company is a company of the Zakhid Battalion of the Liut Brigade of the Special Tasks Patrol Police subordinated to Ministry of Internal Affairs of Ukraine. The company is currently based in Khmelnytskyi. It was established in 2014 and has, since then seen regular combat on the frontlines.

== History ==
On 12 June 2014, following the start of the War in Donbass, the Bohdan Company was established in Khmelnytskyi Oblast. The company was formed exclusively from volunteers, including many former law enforcement officers and veterans as well as those from "peaceful" professions like drivers, millers and even a poet. In July 2014, the company's personnel underwent intensive training. The training included long-distance hikes in wooded and rugged terrain and automatic weapons practice amongst others. On 12 July 2014, the company was deployed to the ATO zone. On 20 July 2014, officers of the Bohdan Company detained a politician from Sloviansk, wanted for involvement in the Donetsk People's Republic apparatus. He was then handed over to the Security Service of Ukraine. It was initially a part of the Svyatyi Mykolai Battalion. In mid-August 2014, about 50 more soldiers of the Company went to the ATO zone. On 16 August 2014, some soldiers of the Company returned from the ATO zone to Khmelnytskyi. On 30 September 2014, 50 personnel of the Company left for Vuhlehirsk where they protected the area near Debaltseve and conducted law enforcement operations.

Following the Russian invasion of Ukraine, it saw combat against Russian forces. In April 2022, it became a part of Zakhid Battalion which in 2023 became a part of the Liut Brigade. It is currently fighting on the frontlines.

== Commanders ==
- Oleksandr Zhemenyk
- Andrii Lyshen
