= Ivano-Frankivsk Company (Ukraine) =

- Ukrainian: Поліцейська рота «Івано-Франківськ»
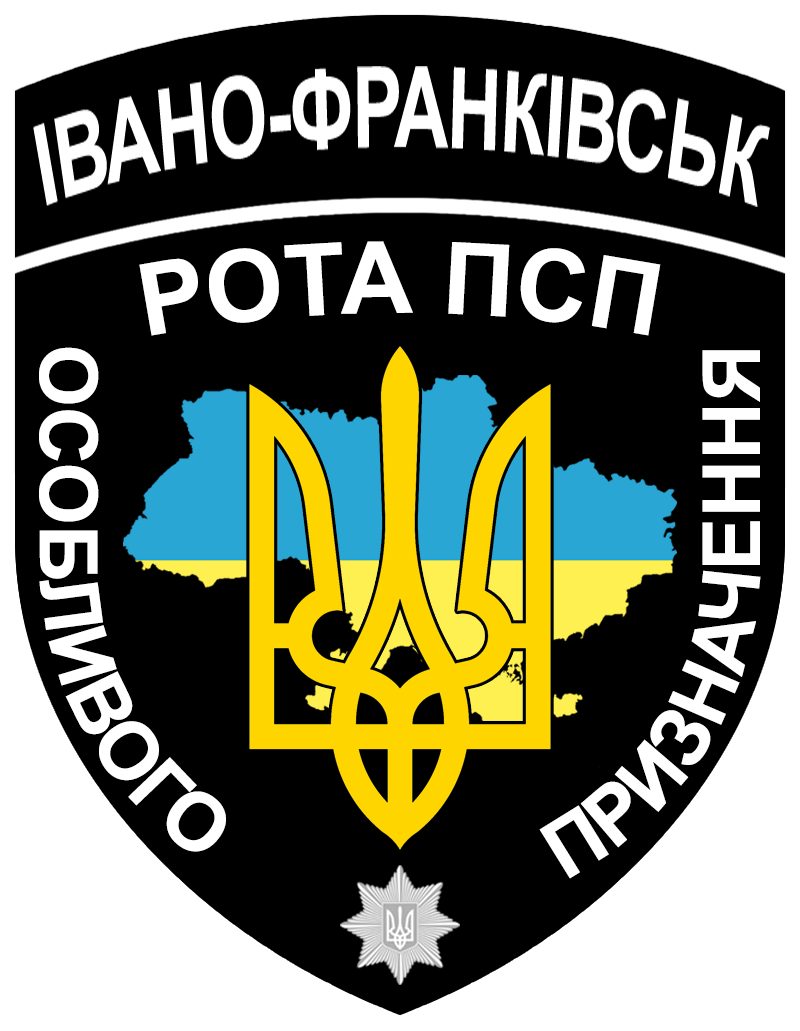
- Ivano-Frankivsk Company Insignia
- Active: 2014–present
- Country: Ukraine
- Branch: Ministry of Internal Affairs
- Type: Special Tasks Patrol Police
- Size: 200
- Part of: Liut Brigade
- Garrison/HQ: Ivano-Frankivsk Oblast
- Engagements: Russo-Ukrainian War: War in Donbass; Battle of Ilovaisk; Battle of Mariupol; 2022 Russian invasion of Ukraine

Commanders
- Current commander: Colonel Mykola Romanovych Ivonyak

Insignia
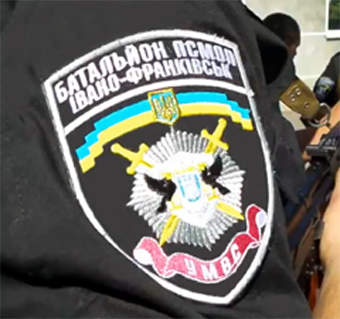
- Former Insignia

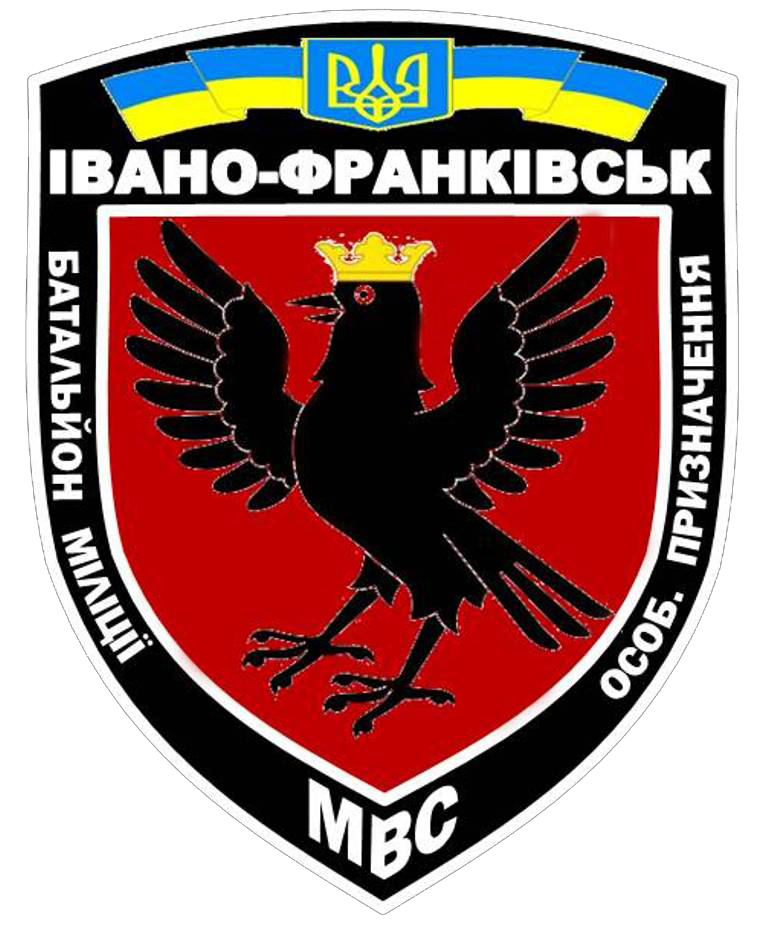
- Former Insignia

The Ivano-Frankivsk Company is a company of the Liut Brigade of the Special Tasks Patrol Police subordinated to Ministry of Internal Affairs of Ukraine. The company is based in Ivano-Frankivsk. It was established in 2014 and has, since then seen regular combat on the frontlines.

== History ==
It was established in May 2014. On 31 July 2014, 120 soldiers of the battalion took the oath of loyalty to Ukraine and went to ATO zone at the start of August 2014. In August 2014, the "Ivano-Frankivsk" battalion took part in the Battle of Ilovaisk during which eight soldiers of the Battalion (Andriy Mykhailovych Karabinovych, Mykhailo Anatoliyovych Pogorelov, Zoryan Mykhailovych Bilinskyi, Perepichka Oleg Hryhorovych, Dmytro Viktorovych Pacino, Hrytsyk Roman Vasyliovych, Yuriy Ivanovich Kosovchych and Ihor Stepanovych Harasymchuk) were killed and a vehicle of the brigade was also destroyed. On 31 August 2014, battalion commander Oleksandr Polishchuk and 17 other soldiers broke through the encirclement in Ilovaisk and marched towards Dnipropetrovsk, four were severely wounded and had to be evacuated by helicopter. On 12 September 2014, despite the heavy losses sustained during the Battle of Ilovaisk, the battalion again went to the ATO zone stating: "It's scary to drive, you have to attack to survive. Only then will it be possible not to survive, but to live". In September–October 2014, civilians from Transcarpathia provided large amount of aid for the fighters of the "Ivano-Frankivsk" battalion. On 10 October 2014, 20 personnel of the Battalion took the oath of loyalty and the Battalion was again deployed to the ATO zone, this time in Mariupol.

From 2022, following the Russian invasion of Ukraine, it has been operating as a company In 2023, it became a part of the Liut Brigade.

== Commanders ==
- Colonel Oleksandr Polishchuk
- Colonel Hladky Dmytro
- Colonel Mykola Romanovych Ivonyak

== Sources ==
- Новобранці батальйону «Івано-Франківськ» склали урочисту присягу (фоторепортаж)
- Понад 200 правоохоронців готуються до бойових дій у складі батальйону МВС «Івано-Франківськ» on YouTube
- Батальйон МВС «Івано-Франківськ» перед відправкою на фронт on YouTube
- Батальйон МВС «Івано-Франківськ» відбуває на фронт on YouTube
