= Sviatoslav Company (Ukraine) =

- Ukrainian: Рота поліції «Святослав»
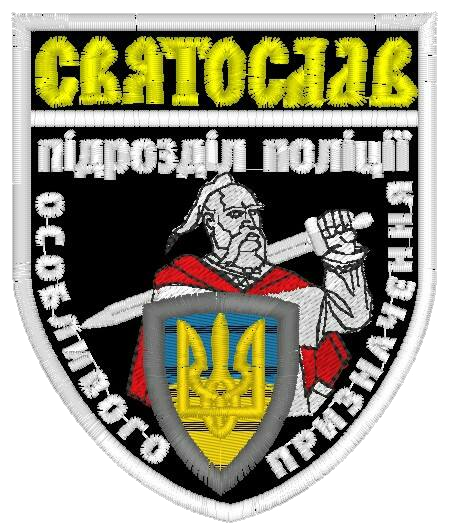
- Sviatoslav Company Insignia
- Active: 2014–present
- Country: Ukraine
- Branch: Ministry of Internal Affairs
- Type: Special Tasks Patrol Police
- Size: 100
- Part of: Enei Battalion
- Garrison/HQ: Kirovohrad
- Patron: Sviatoslav I
- Engagements: Russo-Ukrainian War: War in Donbas; Battle of Lysychansk; Battle of Debaltseve; Battle of Volnovakha; Battle of Popasna; Battle of Mariupol; Russian invasion of Ukraine

Commanders
- Current commander: Sergey Kurylenko

Insignia
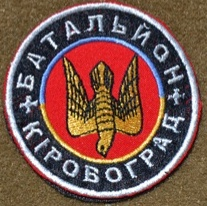
- Former Insignia

The Sviatoslav Company is a company of the Enei Battalion of the Liut Brigade of the Special Tasks Patrol Police subordinated to Ministry of Internal Affairs of Ukraine. The company is currently based in Kirovohrad. It was established in 2014 and has, since then seen regular combat on the frontlines

== History ==
It was established in May 2014 during the War in Donbass as the Kirovohrad Battalion in Kirovohrad. On 1 August 2014, the soldiers of the Kirovohrad battalion took the oath of loyalty to Ukraine. On 3 August 2014, the battalion went to the ATO zone in Debaltseve maintaining public order and conducting law enforcement in the city. They conducted operation in the former building of the city council, a hideout of an armed criminal organisation. The personnel of the local district department and the Kirovohrad battalion advanced to the location and a shootout ensued. During the shootout, a local law enforcement officer was wounded. Ultimately all criminals were detained and the operation was successful. Then the battalion also provided security to Verkhovna Rada of Ukraine and during elections in Vinnytsia. In 2015, they were deployed to Vuhlehirsk in the ATO zone to protect public order and provide security. They encountered a group of suspicious persons who attacked them. The fighters of the bathroom regrouped and launched a counterattack detaining the criminals without sustaining losses. Overall, the battalion saw deployment in Volnovakha, Vuhlehirsk, Debaltseve, Zolote, Lysychansk, Mariupol and Popasna. On 10 December 2016, it was renamed in honor of prince Sviatoslav I. In 2018, the Sviatoslav battalion was reduced to a company with 90 personnel in service. In 2023, it became a part of the Enei Battalion of the Liut Brigade It is currently operating as a part of the Enei Battalion during the Russian invasion of Ukraine.

== Sources ==
External videos
- 1. Батальйон Кіровоград 3
- 2. Батальйон Кіровоград 2
- 3. Батальйон ППС міліції особливого призначення «Кіровоград»

- В Україні створено 30 спецпідрозділів особливого призначення, — Арсен Аваков
- Бійці батальйону патрульної служби особливого призначення «Кіровоград» склали Присягу на вірність народу України (ФОТО, ВІДЕО)
- Спецпризначенці батальйону «Кіровоград» продемонстрували свої професійні вміння та навички під час показових виступів (ФОТО, ВІДЕО)
- Як формується батальйон «Кіровоград»?
