= Skif Battalion (Ukraine) =

- Ukrainian: Батальйон поліції «Скіф»
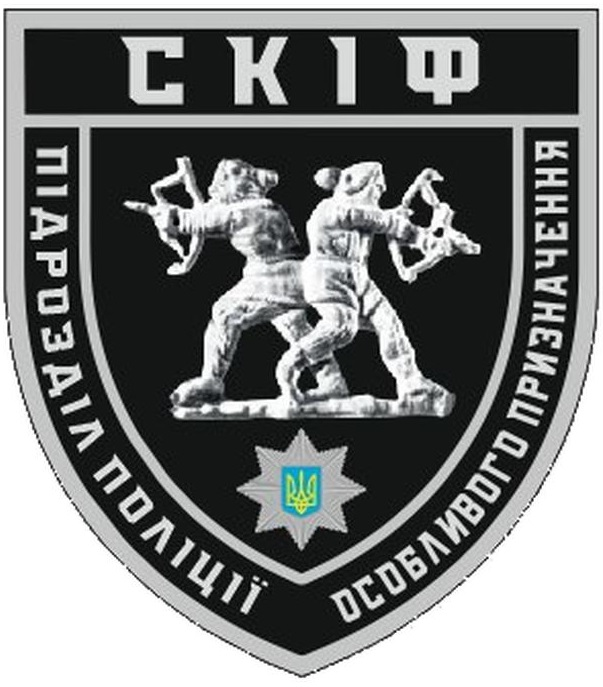
- Skif Battalion Insignia
- Active: 2014–present
- Country: Ukraine
- Branch: Ministry of Internal Affairs
- Type: Special Tasks Patrol Police
- Role: See #Tasks
- Size: 500
- Part of: Liut Brigade
- Garrison/HQ: Kyiv Oblast
- Engagements: Russo-Ukrainian War: War in Donbas; Battles of Sievierodonetsk; Battle of Mariupol; Russian invasion of Ukraine; Northern Ukraine campaign; Battle of Kyiv (2022); 2023 Ukrainian counteroffensive; Operations against Ukrainian mafia

Commanders
- Current commander: Lieutenant Colonel Mykola Hryhorovych Kulchytskyi

Insignia
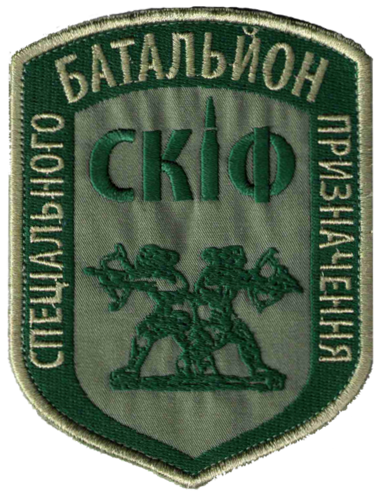
- Former Insignia

The Skif Battalion is a regiment of the Liut Brigade of the Special Tasks Patrol Police subordinated to Ministry of Internal Affairs of Ukraine. The regiment is currently based in Kyiv. It was established in 2014 and has, since then seen regular combat on the frontlines in addition to special counter-crime operations in Kyiv Oblast.

== History ==
In June 2014, during the War in Donbass, the Skif Battalion was created as a volunteer police Battalion in Zaporizhzhia Oblast tasked with counterterrorism, the protection of Ukrainian sovereignty and territorial integrity and law enforcement. From August 2014 to October 2019, personnel of the Skif battalion served at checkpoints located on the border of the Zaporizhia Oblast especially in Rozivka, Bilmak, Temyrivka, Pology and Energodar. From February 2015, the personnel of the battalion have also been deployed to the ATO zone especially in Lysychansk during the Battle of Sievierodonetsk as well as in Shyrokyne standoff and the Battle of Mariupol. The personnel of the battalion have also been involved in the protection and maintenance of public order and safety in Luhansk Oblast conducting special operations against organized crime as well as performing similar operations in Zaporizhzhia, Berdiansk and Melitopol, outside the ATO zone.

Following the Russian invasion of Ukraine, the Skif Battalion became a part of the Liut Brigade. It saw multiple engagements against Russian forces and inflicted heavy casualties on Russian troops. The battalion took part in the Battle of Kyiv, and received 75 bulletproof vest, machine guns, and a pickup truck. It also received hundreds of units of tactical ammunition of the M-Tac brand—balaclavas, tactical gloves, backpacks, briefcases, carcases, socks, panamas and plate armor—costing UAH 1 million. Nissan Navara vehicles were also donated to the battalion. On 14 December 2023, the Skif Battalion attacked Russian positions in Zaporizhzhia Oblast as a part of the 2023 Ukrainian counteroffensive destroying Russian equipment of the occupiers and killing four Russian soldiers. The battalion also destroyed the Murom-M surveillance complex with the help of FPV drones as well as damaging two armored personnel carriers, a tank and an infantry fighting vehicle with its crew being wounded. The damaged tank was destroyed by ground personnel of the battalion, who also destroyed a BREM. Four more Russian soldiers were wounded in this attack.

== Commanders ==
- Lieutenant Colonel Mykola Hryhorovych Kulchytskyi

== Tasks ==
The main tasks of the battalion are as follows:

- Ensuring public safety and maintaining public order during meetings, rallies, demonstrations and other events
- Protection of citizens, their rights, freedoms and legitimate interests
- Protection of the buildings of the Ministry of Internal Affairs of Ukraine
- Dealing with criminal and administrative offensives in or near the buildings of the Administration of the president of Ukraine, the Verkhovna Rada of Ukraine, the Government of Ukraine, including during events with the participation of high-ranking officials of the state, foreign delegations, as well as along the routes taken
- Capturing high-ranking members of Ukrainian mafia and organized criminal organizations
- Hostage rescue operations
- Dismantling illegal Paramilitaries, armed groups and separatist organizations
- Special operations to provide support to police and other law enforcement agencies during high risk situations
- Safety of persons during judicial proceedings

== Sources ==
External videos
- 1. Батальйон «Скіф» проходить вишколи - потім в зону #АТО // 5 канал, 11 липня 2014.
- 2. Вишкіл батальйону спецпризначення «Скіф» // Репортер UA

- На Запоріжжі триває підготовка міліцейського батальйону спецпризначення «Скіф» для відправки в зону АТО (ФОТО)
- Запорожский батальон особого назначения «Скиф» идет в зону АТО
- Голова облдержадміністрації ознайомився з умовами підготовки добровольців
