= Liut Brigade =

Ukrainian special police unit

Special Purpose Police Department "United Assault Brigade of the National Police of Ukraine 'Liut'"
- Департамент поліції особливого призначення «Об'єднана штурмова бригада Національної поліції України „Лють“»
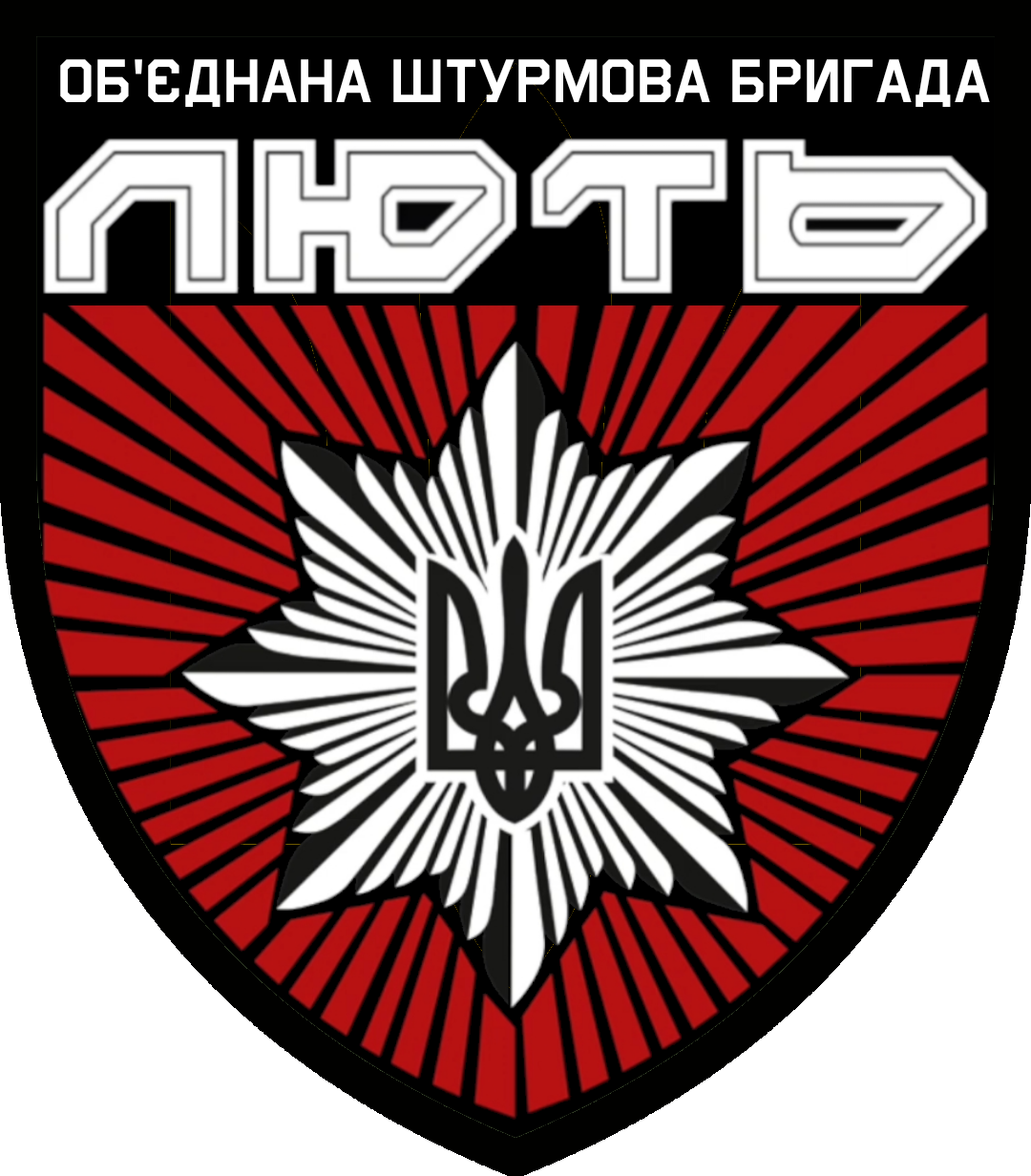
- Sleeve patch of the Brigade
- Active: January 13, 2023 – Present
- Country: Ukraine
- Branch: National Police of Ukraine
- Role: Offensive Guard
- Size: 1,200-1,500
- Motto: "Turn your rage into a weapon" (Перетвори свою лють на зброю)
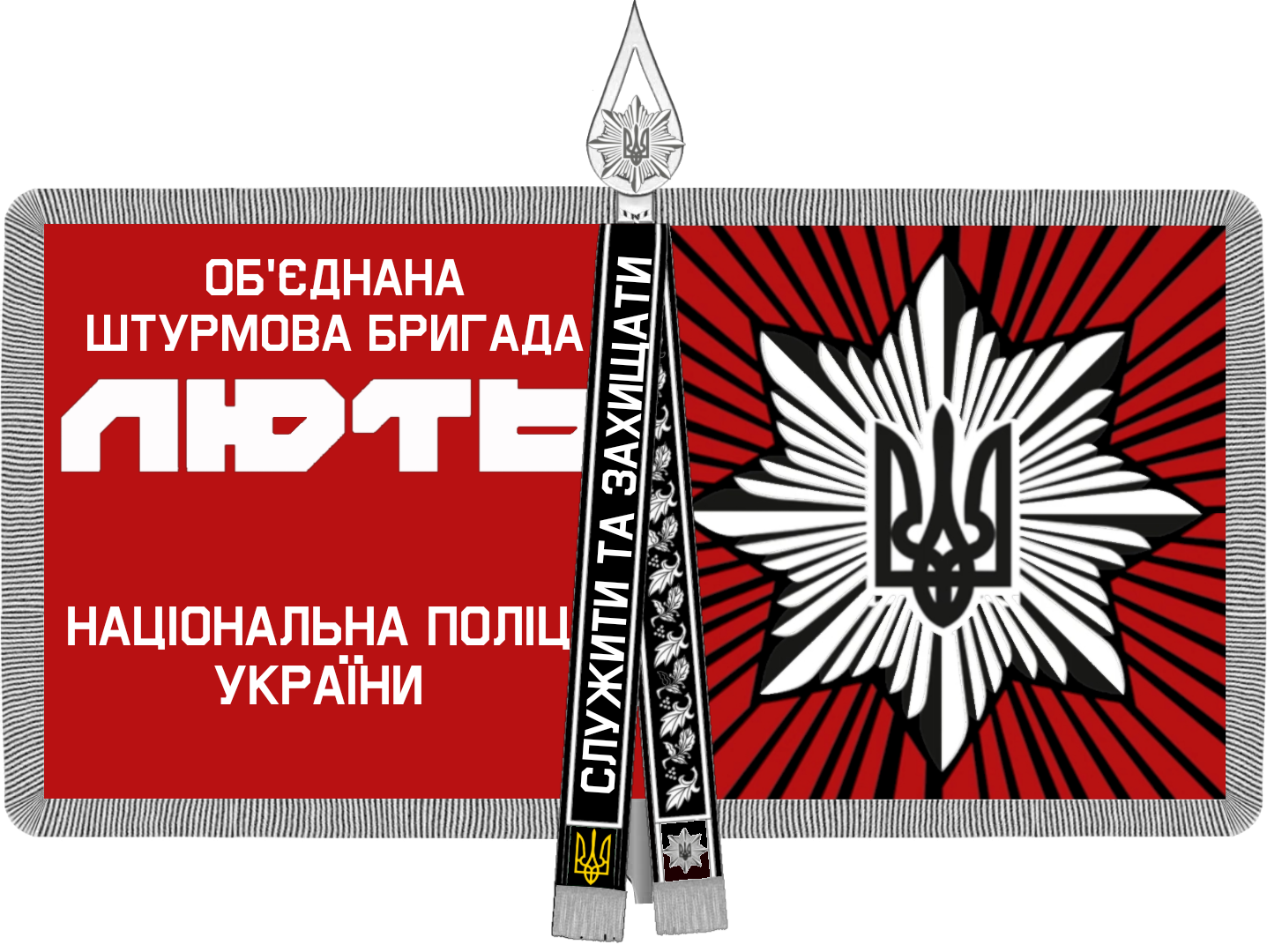
- Colors
- Engagements: Russian invasion of Ukraine: Northern Ukraine campaign; Battle of Irpin; 2023 Ukrainian counteroffensive; Battle of Toretsk; 2024 Kharkiv offensive

Commanders
- Current commander: Colonel Oleksandr Netrebko
- Notable commanders: Lt. Colonel Alexander Gostischev †

Insignia
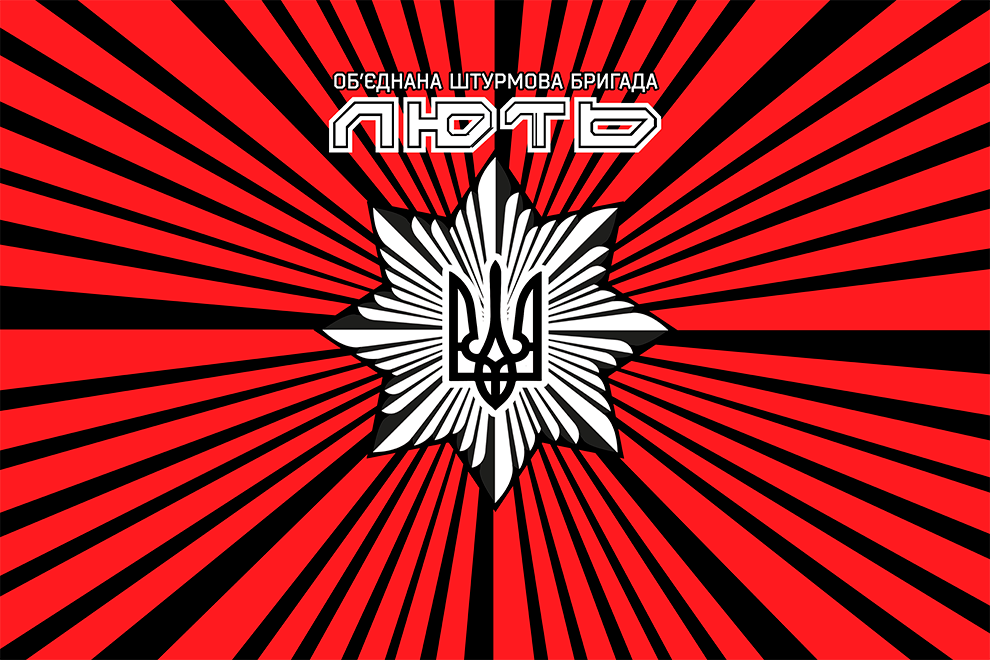
- Flag

The Liut Brigade (Ukrainian: бригади Лють, lit. 'Fury Brigade', also spelled Lyut; formally the Special Purpose Police Department "United Assault Brigade of the National Police of Ukraine 'Liut'"; Департамент поліції особливого призначення «Об'єднана штурмова бригада Національної поліції України „Лють“», abbr. ОШБ НПУ «Лють») is an assault brigade of the National Police of Ukraine formed on January 13, 2023, as a merger of three Special Purpose units from the War in Donbas.

== History ==
=== Formation ===
During the War in Donbas, Ukraine turned local police, militias, paramilitaries and volunteers from the Donetsk and Luhansk Oblasts that remained loyal to Ukraine into impromptu military formations called special purpose units, that specialized in assault operations. These units were technically part of the National Guard of Ukraine, however, largely operated independently. During outbreak of the Russian Invasion of Ukraine, Denys Monastyrsky, then Minister of Internal Affairs, sought to restructure these units shortly before his death. Many of these units were merged into newer, more professional units, named the Offensive Guard. Three special purpose units, the Safari Regiment, Tsunami Regiment, and Luhansk-1 Battalion, which were made up of policemen, were merged to form the basis of the Liut Brigade, which would be subordinated to the National Police of Ukraine (NPU), and later joined by the Myrotvorets, Skif, Zakhid, and Enei Battalions. The NPU views the Liut Brigade, and other units based on police formations as a necessary patch, with NPU chief, Ivan Vyhivskyi, stating in an interview with The Washington Post on 17 November 2023, that: "I hope... that with time there will be no need for such a brigade." The brigades first, and so far only, commander is Police Colonel Oleksandr Netrebko, who, at the start of the invasion, was a veteran during the War in Donbas who then was an officer on deputation with the Patrol Police branch in Kyiv City.

=== Irpin ===
The unit first saw combat during the Battle of Irpin. The nascent brigade was rushed into creation to stop a Russian advance on Kyiv, and Netrebko noted that their presence shocked many members of the Ukrainian military, with one soldier coming up to him and asking "The police are at war? How is that possible?" The unit at that point was exclusively police officers, namely from Kyiv's Rapid Operational Response Unit (KORD) unit and largely wore a mismatch of police uniforms and surplus camouflage and used armored cars on loan from local banks as they "became military within a day."

The units were also open to new recruitment, seeing a surge of civilian enlistment during and after the Battle of Kyiv, and the Brigade is noted as having a higher concentration of woman soldiers when compared to other Ukrainian military formations. Prior to being sent to the front, their training was directly supervised by Dmytro Nazarenko, head of the Kyiv Oblast State Administration.

As with other NPU military formations, recruitment targets former members of the police, and members of the Liut Brigade can either use traditional military ranks, or if they were an active or former police officer, could either retain or be restored to their police rank. Members are also promised post-war employment as police officers, and active police members that joined are promised pay raises.

=== Klishchiivka ===
The brigade shifted towards the Eastern front and has taken part in the 2023 Ukrainian counteroffensive, seeing front line combat on the Donetsk oblast. Notably being involved in the liberation of Klishchiivka on September 16, 2023, and receiving praise from President Volodymyr Zelenskyy for their role in freeing the village.

=== Odesa airstrike ===
On 15 March 2024, an airstrike on Odesa killed 21 individuals, including Lieutenant Colonel Alexander Gostischev, the commander of the Tsunami regiment.

=== Toretsk ===
The Brigade was heavily deployed in the defence of Toretsk. Fierce street to street combat broke out. In September 2024 The Lyut Brigade blew up a bridge to stop the Russian advance. In November 2024 the Brigade intercepted Russian radio signals and ambushed the enemy.

== Structure ==
- Brigade Headquarters and Headquarters Company
- Safari Regiment
- Tsunami Regiment
  - 1st Battalion
  - 2nd Battalion
  - 3rd Battalion
  - 4th Tavr Battalion
- Luhansk Regiment
- Dnipro-1 Regiment
  - 1st Armored Company
  - 2nd Infantry Company
  - 3rd Aerorozvidka Group
  - 4th Kryvbas Company
  - 5th Donetsk-1 Company
  - 6th Krym Company
- Myrotvorets Battalion
  - 1st Company
  - 2nd Kyivschyna Company
  - 3rd Harpoon Company
- Skif Battalion
- Zakhid Battalion
  - 1st Company
  - Svitiaz Company
  - Bohdan Company
- Enei Battalion
  - Sviatoslav Company
- Shtorm Battalion
- Ivano-Frankivsk Company

== Equipment and Training ==
The Brigade, as the police of the trenches, have utilized a variety of equipment from Ukraine and allies especially armored personnel carriers. This has included Roshel Senator armored vehicles. and M113 armored carriers. In January 2024 the Brigade received BMR M-600 armored personnel in a medical configuration from Spain. In June 2025 the BMR M-600 armored personnel was seen deployed in action by the Brigade.

Elite marksman of the Liut Brigade were trained by the Come Back Alive Foundation. The Charity trained 40 men in the use of new optics. They also donated Tand helped customize 32 optical and 8 thermal imaging sights, observation optics, rangefinders, weather stations, silencers, and other equipment.

In 2024, the unit received Oncilla armored vehicles and T-64BV tanks.

== Gallery ==
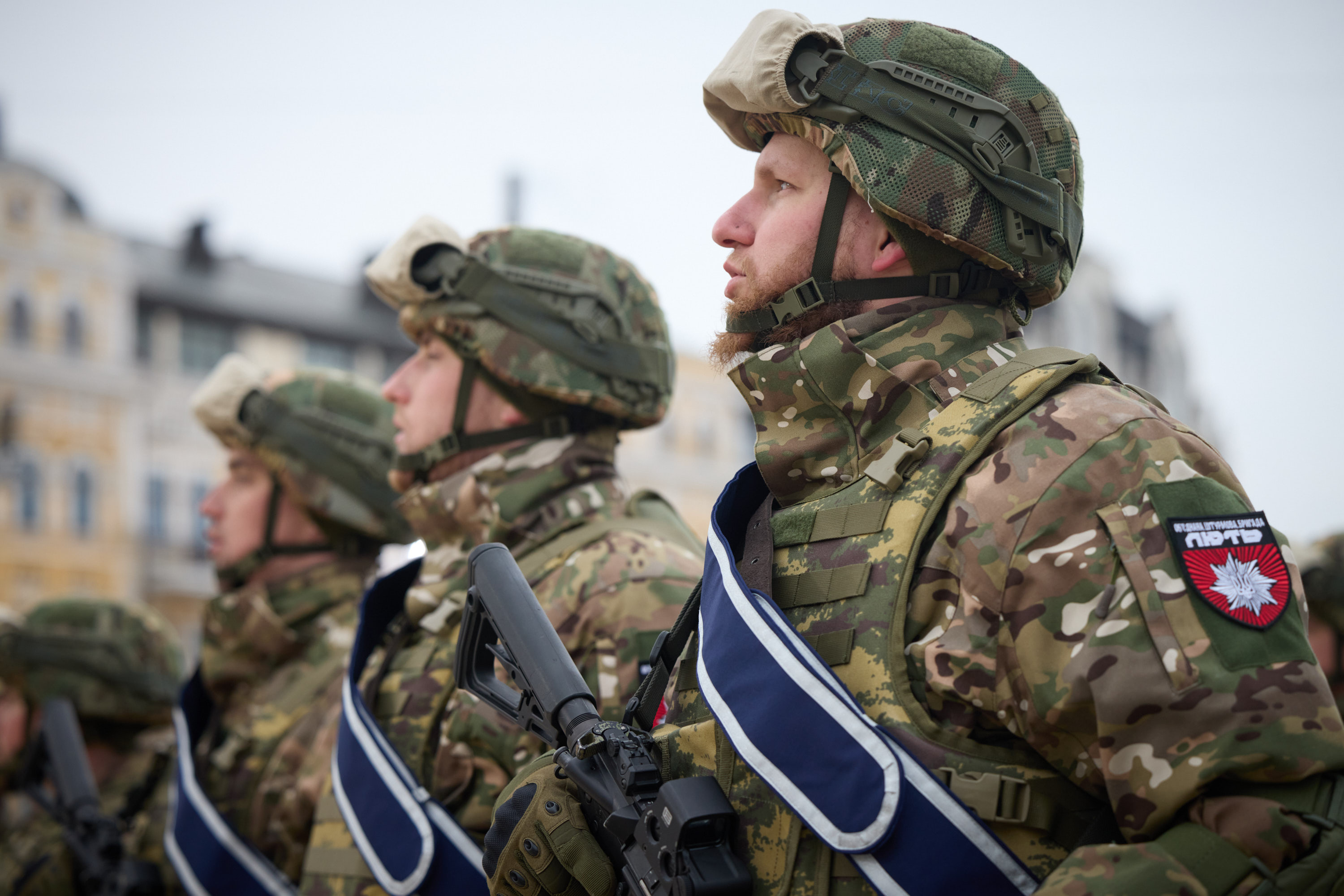
Members of the Brigade on February 24, 2023

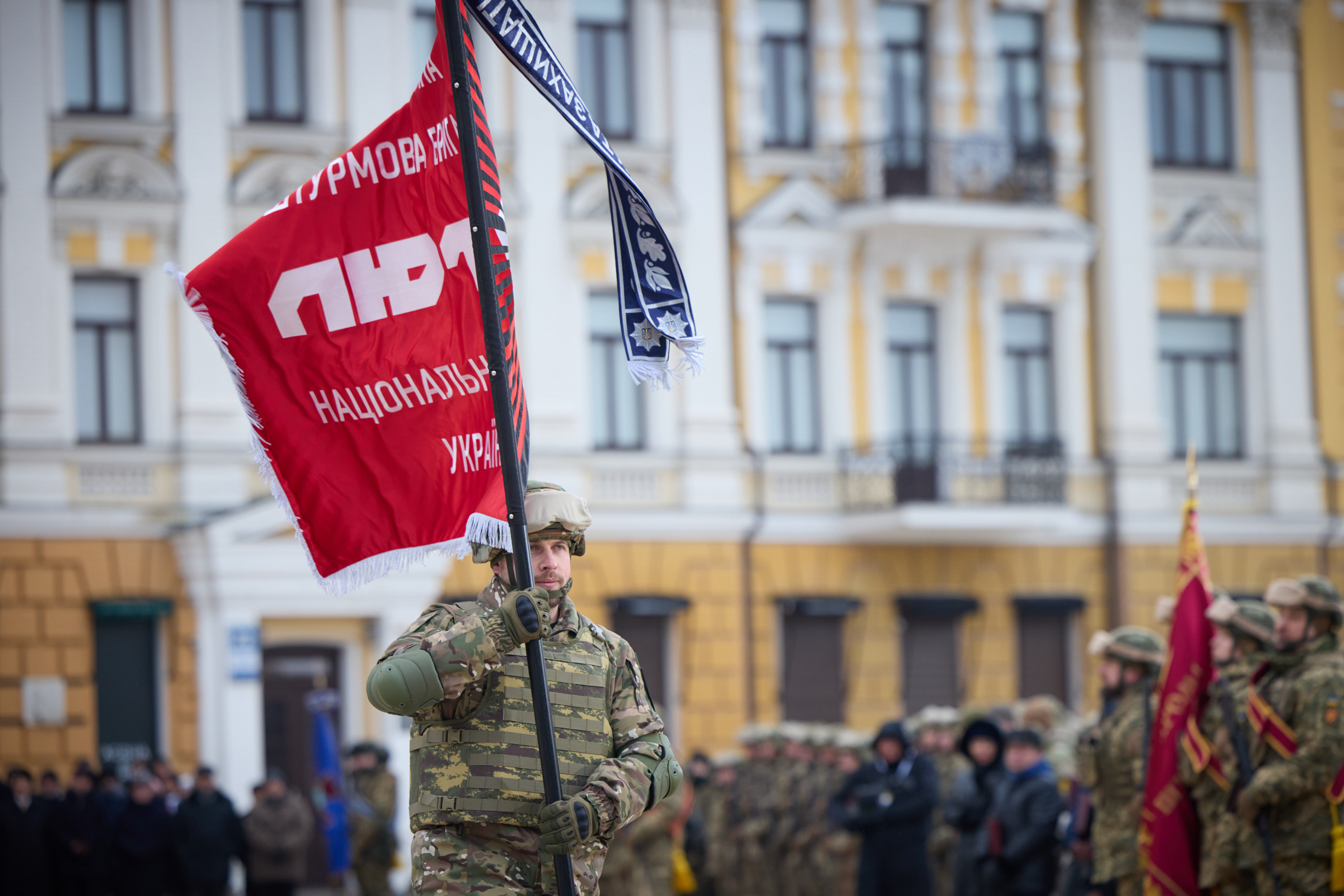
Presentation of the Brigade's Colors

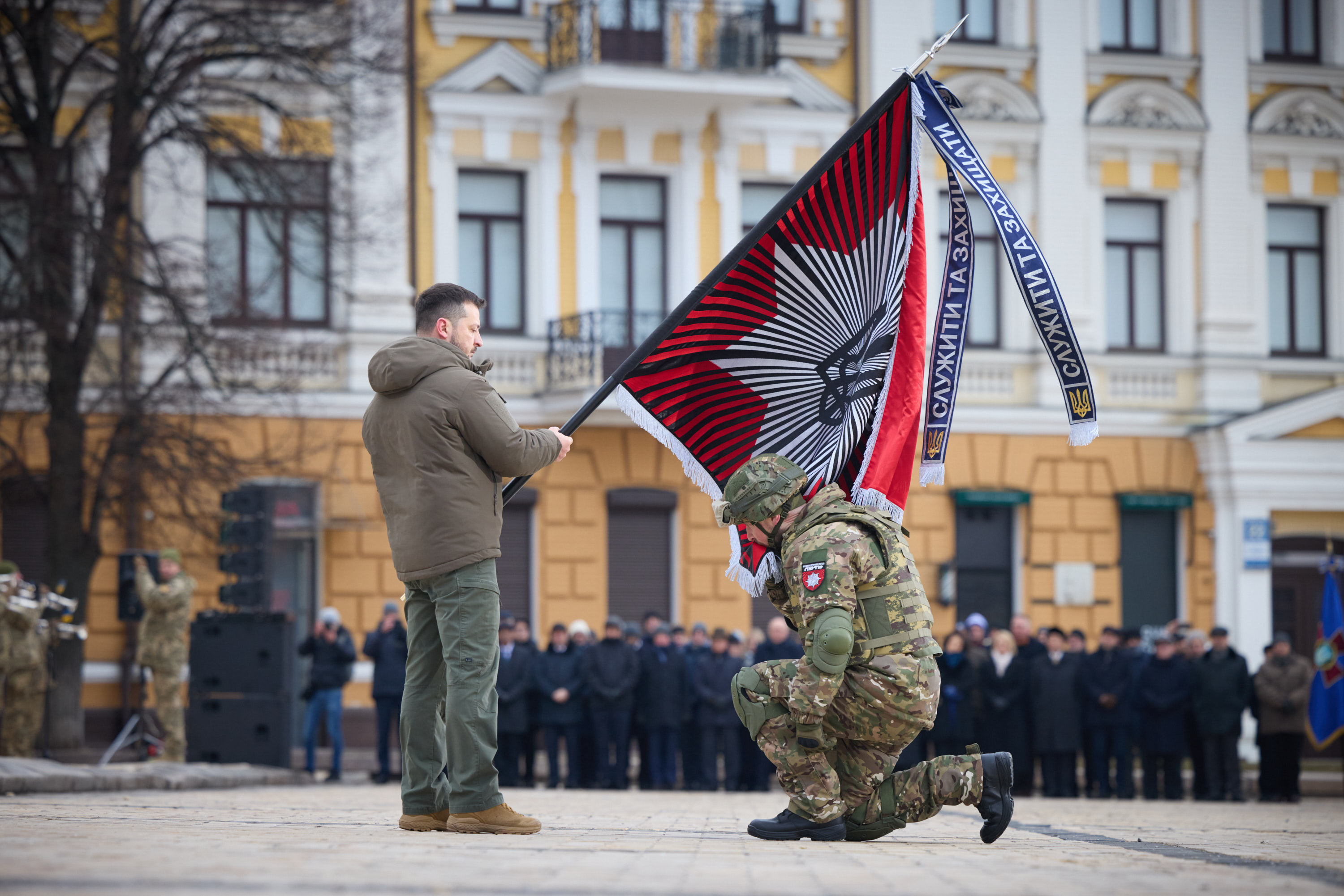
President Volodymyr Zelenskyy at the Brigade's oath swearing

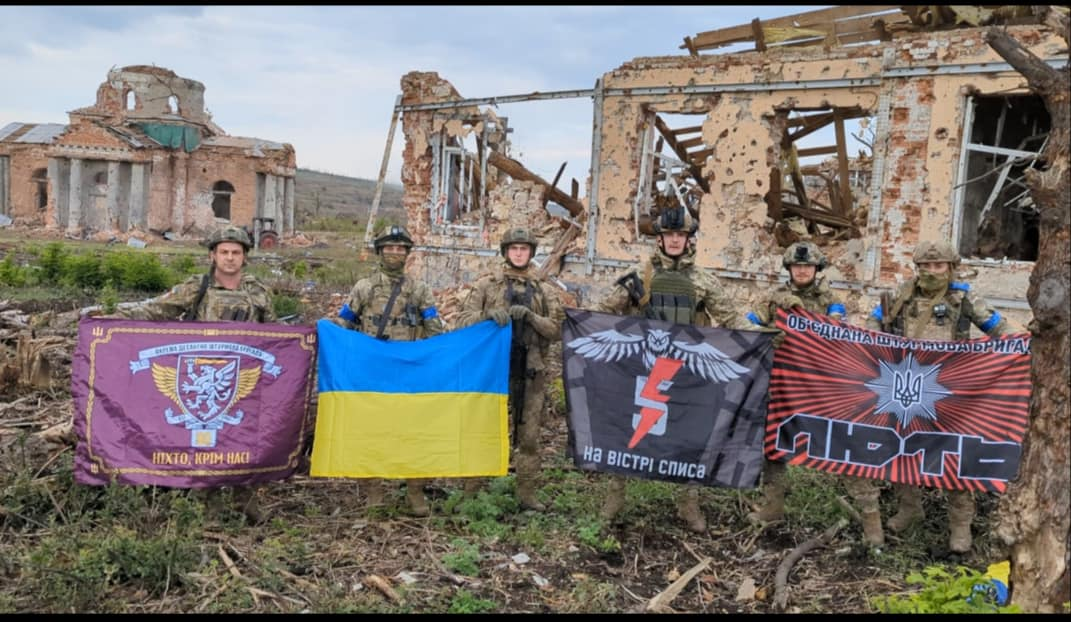
A member of the unit posing with the Brigade's flag after the liberation of Klishchiivka on September 17, 2023
