= Safari Regiment (Ukraine) =

- Ukrainian: Штурмовий полк «Сафарі»
- Safari Regiment Insignia
- Active: 2022–present
- Country: Ukraine
- Branch: Ministry of Internal Affairs
- Type: Special Tasks Patrol Police
- Role: #Tasks
- Part of: Liut Brigade
- Garrison/HQ: Kyiv
- Engagements: Russo-Ukrainian War; Russian invasion of Ukraine; Northern Ukraine campaign; Battle of Kyiv (2022); Battle of Bucha; Battle of Irpin; Battle of Okhtyrka; Battle of Makariv; Battle of Sumy; Battles in Zhytomyr Oblast; Southern Ukraine campaign; Dnieper campaign; Eastern Ukraine campaign; Battle of Kharkiv; Battle of Bakhmut; Battle of Toretsk

Commanders
- Current commander: Lieutenant Colonel Maksym Ihorovych Kochenko

Insignia
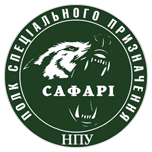
- Former Insignia

The 1st Special Purpose "Safari" Assault Police Regiment is a regiment of the Liut Brigade of the Special Tasks Patrol Police subordinated to Ministry of Internal Affairs of Ukraine. The regiment is based in Kyiv. It was established in 2022 in the wake of the Russian invasion of Ukraine and has, since then seen regular combat on the frontlines.

== History ==
=== 2022 ===
In February 2022, following the Russian invasion of Ukraine, the National Police of Ukraine established the Special Purpose Regiment "Safari" to take part in the Northern Ukraine campaign, especially in the Battle of Kyiv, the regiment included KORD and TOR fighters, as well as explosive specialists. On 2 April 2022, the Russian forces retreated from Kyiv, and the Safari regiment was deployed to conduct a clearance operation to eliminate all remaining Russian forces in the aftermath of the Battle of Bucha. In April 2022, the regiment was taking part in the Battle of Kharkiv facing its first casualties. On 22 May 2022, the base of Safari regiment in Zaporizhzhia Oblast was hit by a Russian missile strike killing 23 servicemen and wounding multiple more. However, the identity of only two fallen servicemen in the missile strike (Oleiynyk Vitaly Viktorovych and Vladyslav Ihorovych Klischuk) was disclosed. In August 2022, the regiment's positions were shelled by Russian BM-21 Grads. In October 2022, the regiment's personnel captured the village of Yampil. Throughout 2022, the regiment was deployed in Kyiv Oblast, Irpin, Zhytomyr Oblast, Makariv, Sumy Oblast, Kharkiv Oblast and Okhtyrka.

=== 2023 ===
On 2 February 2023, the Safari regiment was reorganized into the 1st Special Purpose "Safari" Assault Police Regiment of the consolidated Liut Brigade. The Safari regiment HQ is located in Kyiv but in March 2023, a secondary base was established in Zhytomyr Oblast. In July 2023, the Safari regiment was deployed to take part in the Eastern Ukraine campaign conducting assault operations in Kurdyumivka, Andriivka, and Klishchiivka. In August 2023, the regiment captured a settlement from the Russian troops successfully killing 5 Russian soldiers and wounding 10 more and then conducted a clearance operation in the area.

=== 2024 ===
In September 2024, the regiment was fighting against Russian troops during the Battle of Toretsk facing some wounded. The regiment's soldiers also destroyed several buildings in Toretsk to halt the Russian assault.

== Tasks ==
- Working in cooperation with units of the Armed Forces of Ukraine, the Main Directorate of Intelligence (Ukraine), the National Guard of Ukraine, the State Border Guard Service of Ukraine and other components of Ukrainian defense forces in repelling and deterring armed aggression against Ukraine
- Carrying out Shock and awe assault and reconnaissance operations
- Stabilization of the situations during an armed conflict or an emergency
- Organization and implementation of measures for Search and Rescue operations
- Protection of Ukrainian territorial integrity
- Detection and diffusion of explosives
- Countersabotage operations
- Aerial reconnaissance and artillery strikes on the territories occupied by "enemy" forces
- Ground maneuvers to support simultaneous and consecutive strikes on "enemy" positions using a variety of equipment.
- Destruction of "enemy" equipment and manpower
- Conducting clearance and stabilization operations in captured territory
- Tactical assaults to break the "enemy" defensive lines

== Commanders ==
- Lieutenant Colonel Maksym Ihorovych Kochenko
