= Enei Battalion (Ukraine) =

- Ukrainian: Батальйон спеціальних операцій «Еней»
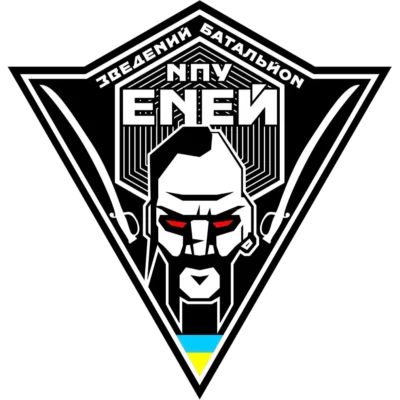
- Enei Battalion Insignia
- Active: 2022–present
- Country: Ukraine
- Branch: Ministry of Internal Affairs
- Type: Special Tasks Patrol Police
- Size: Classified
- Part of: Liut Brigade
- Garrison/HQ: Kyiv Oblast
- Engagements: Russo-Ukrainian War: Russian invasion of Ukraine; Northern Ukraine campaign; Battle of Kyiv (2022); Eastern Ukraine campaign; Battle of Bakhmut; Battle of Toretsk

The Special Operations Enei Battalion is a battalion of the Liut Brigade of the Special Tasks Patrol Police subordinated to Ministry of Internal Affairs of Ukraine. The regiment is based in Kyiv. It was established in 2022 in the wake of the Russian invasion of Ukraine and has, since then seen regular combat on the frontlines.

== History ==
In February 2022, following the Russian invasion of Ukraine, the Enei Battalion was established as a part of a united police command against Russian forces. The battalion was composed of former volunteer units of the National Police of Ukraine and immediately took part in the Battle of Kyiv and then deployed to fight in the Battle of Bakhmut. In 2023, the battalion became part of the Liut Brigade as the Enei Special Operations Company, fighting in Bakhmut. On 30 July 2023, the company conducted an assault on Russian positions in Bakhmut capturing 5 Russian soldiers. In January 2024, the company was expanded to a Battalion. On 1 March 2024, the Battalion received commendation for its actions during the Russo-Ukrainian war. On 6 March 2024, the heads of the regional departments of the Estonian Police and the Estonian Border Guard, Tarvo Kruup and Vallo Koppel visited the battalion headquarters, and observed its training, armament and commended the Battalion over its tactics and operations. On 28 April 2024, the second season of the "Kyiv Nezlamny" sports tournament was held in the capital's Muromets park, in which more than 180 veterans from different regions of Ukraine, cadets of military and police universities, and about 150 representatives of various law enforcement agencies, including fighters of the battalion, took part. The Enei Battalion won the most prizes in the competition. The battalion then took part in the Battle of Toretsk engaging Russian troops in Pivnichne. During the Battle of Toretsk, the Battalion conducted an operation to capture a strategic building in the city by using two Roshel Senator armored vehicles, the five story building was captured, mined and detonated, opening up the right flank of the Russian forces for direct strikes.

=== Structure ===
- Sviatoslav Company

== Tasks ==
- Special covert operations
- Targeted assaults
- Counterterrorism
- Counter sabotage
- Counterinsurgency
- Counter reconnaissance
- Mining operations
