= Rubizh Brigade =

National Guard of Ukraine unit

4th Brigade of Operational Assignment
- 4-та бригада оперативного призначення
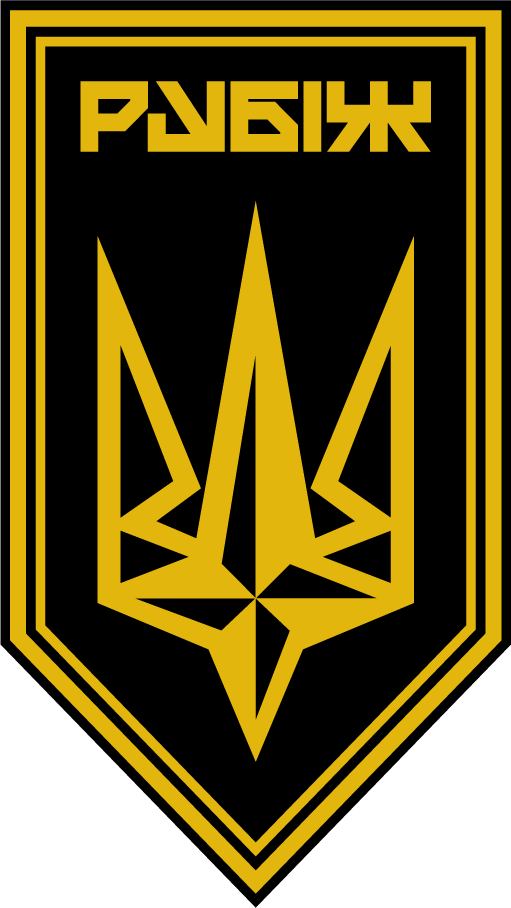
- Shoulder Sleeve Insignia
- Active: 4 January 2016 - present
- Country: Ukraine
- Branch: National Guard of Ukraine
- Type: Offensive Guard
- Role: Rapid reaction force
- Part of: 2nd Khartia Corps
- Garrison/HQ: Hostomel, Kyiv Oblast
- Nickname: Rubizh ("Frontier")
- Patron: Sergeant Serhii Mykhalchuk
- Engagements: Russo-Ukrainian War: Battle of Antonov Airport; Battle of Sievierodonetsk; Battle of Bakhmut
- Decorations: For Courage and Bravery
- Website: https://www.facebook.com/RapidReactionBrigade

Commanders
- Current commander: Artem Ilyukhin

Insignia
- Insignia (2016 – 2026)

The 4th Brigade of Operational Assignment named after Serhiy Mykhalchuk (Ukrainian: 4-та бригада оперативного призначення), also known as the 4th Rapid Reaction Brigade "Rubizh" (Ukrainian: Бригада швидкого реагування НГУ «Рубіж») is a brigade of the National Guard of Ukraine formed in 2016.

The brigade was established as an elite unit trained and organized under NATO standards. The unit would receive expert support, high-quality selection of fighters and technical equipment. In 2023, the unit was reorganized as one of the National Guard's new Offensive Guard units and renamed as the "Rubizh Brigade".

== History ==
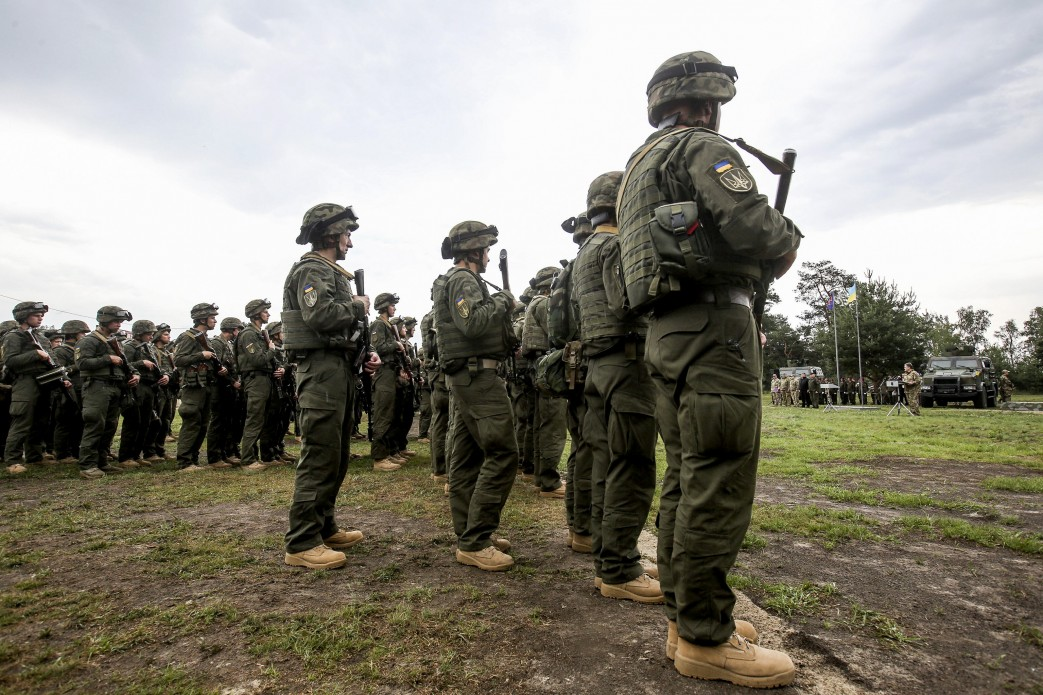
Soldiers of the Brigade in 2016

Although the brigade was established on 2 June 2015, actual recruitment of personnel to the brigade started in October 2015. The unit was trained by foreign military advisers and veterans in conformity with NATO standards, including by Canadian soldiers as part of Operation UNIFIER, most recently in summer 2021. According to Ukrainian Interior Minister Arsen Avakov the creation of the brigade should become the first step towards converting the National Guard into a professional army.

On 2 June 2016, the formation was presented its colours. According to pro-Russian website Essence of Time, on 19 June 2016 President of Ukraine Petro Poroshenko decided to send the Brigade to Donbas. On 11 August 2020, the brigade was awarded the honorific of Sergeant Serhii Mykhalchuk, who died in combat in December 2019 in Bakhmut Raion and was awarded the title 'Hero of Ukraine' posthumously.

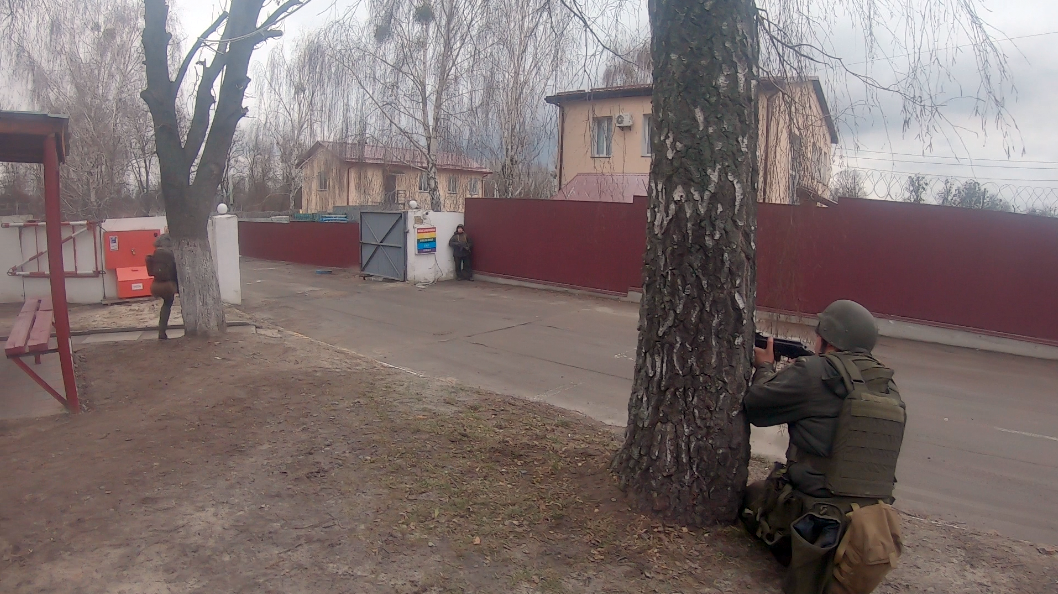
4th Brigade units at the Battle of Antonov Airport

The Brigade was reportedly involved in fighting against a Russian Airborne Troops air assault in the Battle for Antonov Airport, located at outskirts Kyiv in Hostomel, on 24 February 2022, during the Russian invasion of Ukraine. The 4th Brigade's fast reaction and counter-attack prevented the airport from being captured by the Russian forces on the first day, and helped to prevent the airport being used to airlift more troops and capture the capital Kyiv. As a result, the Kyiv offensive turned into a slog fought in the city's northwestern metropolitan areas in Hostomel, Bucha and Irpin.

After the retreat of Russian forces from the Kyiv axis, the 4th Rapid Reaction Brigade was redeployed to the East Ukraine, to fight at the Eastern Ukraine offensive. In the east, unit was involved at the Battle of Severodonetsk, where they fought a month-long defense of the city. And later in the year, the unit was deployed at Bakhmut to fight in the Battle of Bakhmut.

In January 2023 it was announced that the 4th Brigade of Operational Purpose was granted the nickname 4th "Rubizh" Brigade as part of the Offensive Guard program of the MIA of Ukraine.

On 1 July 2024, scouts from the Ukrainian Rubizh Brigade captured “several dozen Russian soldiers”, mostly mobilised conscripts, in an unspecified location.

In November 2024, elements of the brigade were deployed near the village of Stelmakhivka in the Luhansk Oblast.

In February 2025, Danylo Borysenko, a representative of the brigade, said that its battalions were responsible for areas on the Siversk front near the village of Bilohorivka, on the Lyman front near the villages of Yampolivka and Kolodiazi, and on the Kupiansk front near the villages of Zahryzove and Petropavlivka. The next month, he said the brigade's units remained responsible for areas near Bilohorivka, Yampolivka, Zahryzove and Petropavlivka.

As of June 2025, units of the 4th National Guard Brigade were still operating both on the Pokrovsk front and the Siversk front.

On November 4, 2025, Volodymyr Zelenskyy posted a video on his own Twitter account in which he meets with service members of the Rubizh brigade, in the video however the service members can visibly be seen with patches bearing iconography similar to the Schutzstaffel insignia. Additionally a flag can be seen bearing the same logo. This has been since been contested by Ukrainian officials, claiming that while similar, the letters merely depict the number 44, indicating that the soldiers are from the 4th battalion of the 4th brigade.

== Structure ==
As of 2023 the brigade's structure is as follows:

- 4th "Rubizh" Brigade
  - Headquarters & Headquarters Company
  - 1st Battalion of Operational Assignment
  - 2nd Battalion of Operational Assignment
  - 3rd Battalion of Operational Assignment "Svoboda"
  - 4th Guardsmen Battalion
  - 5th Operational Battalion
  - 6th Guardsmen Battalion
  - Special Intelligence Company
  - Snipers Company
  - Tank Company
  - 4th Field Artillery Regt
  - Anti-Aircraft Defense Battalion
  - Signals Company
  - Combat Service Support Battalion
  - Medical Company
  - Brigade Band
