= Shtorm Battalion (Ukraine) =

- Ukrainian: Батальйон поліції «Шторм»
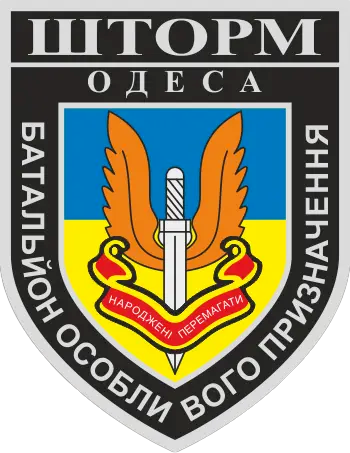
- Skif Battalion Insignia
- Active: 2014–present
- Country: Ukraine
- Branch: Ministry of Internal Affairs
- Type: Special Tasks Patrol Police
- Part of: Liut Brigade
- Garrison/HQ: Odesa Oblast
- Anniversaries: 14 April
- Engagements: Russo-Ukrainian War: 2014 pro-Russian unrest in Ukraine; 2014 Odesa clashes; War in Donbas; Battle of Mariupol; Russian invasion of Ukraine; Eastern Ukraine campaign; Siege of Mariupol; 2022 Kharkiv counteroffensive; Battle of Bakhmut; Southern Ukraine campaign

Commanders
- Current commander: Colonel Anatoly Budzar

Insignia
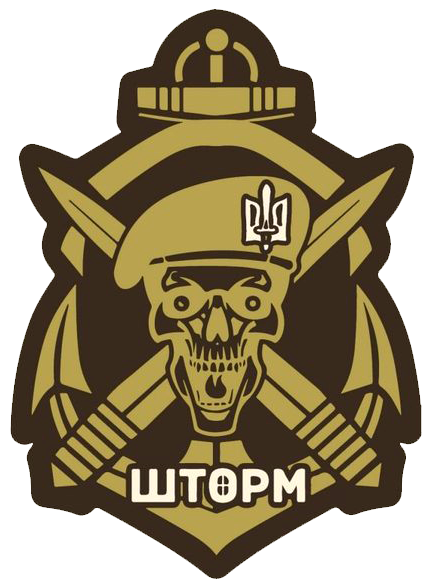
- Former Insignia

The Shtorm Battalion is a regiment of the Liut Brigade of the Special Tasks Patrol Police subordinated to Ministry of Internal Affairs of Ukraine. The regiment is currently based in Odesa. It was established in 2014 and has, since then seen regular combat on the frontlines in addition to special counter-crime operations in Odesa Oblast.

== History ==
The battalion was established on 14 April 2014 in Odesa Oblast consisting of 500 people, which should become the "first echelon of the city's defense" against "fraternal hybrid aggression" in the event of a situation like Mariupol or Sloviansk. The battalion was exclusively composed of volunteers from all over Ukraine including some who joined the battalion immediately after the Revolution of Dignity. There were some difficulties during the battalion's formation but it was deployed to the ATO zone, a month after its establishment. On 20 July 2014, armed with small arms, 50 "Shtorm" soldiers went to the ATO zone. During August 2014, after several days of artillery and mortar shelling, the battalion engaged the Russian 76th Guards Air Assault Division in Heorhiivka capturing two Russian BMD-2s and destroying a tank. On 23 August 2014, the battalion escaped the operational encirclement without casualties and led a column of civilian vehicles to safety, some soldiers returned to Odesa. On 24 August 2014, the battalion's positions in Heorhiivka were attacked by separatists killing two soldiers of the battalion (Petrovsky Stepan Petrovych and Rudnitsky Vadim Volodymyrovych) as well as the destruction of the base and most of the checkpoints in the area as a result of artillery strikes from Lutuhyne leading to the recall of all personnel of the battalion to the ATO zone on 1 September 2014.

External videos
- 1. Батальйон «Шторм» після бою з російськими десантниками // 23 August 2014

Storm battalion operated in Luhansk Oblast till October 2014. On 20 September 2014, on the Nikopol highway in Dnipropetrovsk Oblast, the driver of a bus carrying 34 soldiers of the Shtorm battalion from the ATO zone, fell asleep as he had not rested for the previous two days. The bus drove into a ditch and overturned, two soldiers of the battalion (Oleksandr Borisovych Romanyuk and Oleksandr Yuriyovych Lysokon) died while 30 others were wounded. In late 2014 the battalion was deployed for ensuring security in the Odesa Oblast during the detoriating security situation. Soldiers of the special unit guarded borders, important sites, checkpoints and the sites of separatist attacks. Odesa was struck by six bomb blasts in December 2014, one of which killed one person. In April 2015 it prevented the proclamation of a so-called "Bessarabian People's Republic". The separatist network behind it also wanted to set up a "Odesa People's Republic", "Porto-Franko" and other breakaway entities. In late 2015, the battalion was deployed to Donetsk Oblast. In September 2015, the "Bolgrad" police company became part of the Shtorm battalion as the 3rd company. Its operational service includes 8 districts: Bolhrad Raion, Izmail Raion, Reni Raion, Artsyz Raion, Kiliia Raion, Tatarbunary Raion, Sarata Raion, and Tarutyne Raion. Its tasks included maintaining public order and fighting organized crime and separatism. On 13 April 2016, 60 soldiers of the battalion again went to the ATO zone for three months operating in Mariupol for Demining and guarding operations. On 5 April 2017, some guardsmen from Zhytomyr Oblast, Chernihiv Oblast, and Cherkasy Oblast were relocated to the Shtorm battalion base on order to reduce the increasing crime rate especially the increase in robberies and the issue of hidden separatism. On 19 July 2020, 35 personnel of the battalion went to Mariupol, for defense of strategic sites, duty at checkpoints and law enforcement. On 24 January 2022, the chief of staff of the Shtorm Battalion, Lieutenant Colonel Yevhen Miroshnychenko, became the commander of the Odessa Battalion of the Territorial Defense Forces.

Following the Russian invasion of Ukraine, the battalion took part in the Siege of Mariupol and the Battle of Bakhmut. During the 2022 Kharkiv counteroffensive, the battalion along with Tsunami Regiment capture the village of Lozove and then handed over the village to the Armed Forces of Ukraine, the battalion also conducted clearance operations in Novoselivske following its capture. During these battles two soldiers of the battalion (Serhii Mykhailovych Kuzminov and Dmytro Balan) were killed. The battalion also operated in Kherson Oblast.

== Structure ==
- 1st Company
- 2nd Company
- Separate Bolhrad Company

== Commanders ==
- Colonel Anatoly Budzar

== Sources ==
- Батальйон «Шторм» — волонтерський проєкт
- БПСПОП «ШТОРМ» ГУНП в Одеській області — волонтерський проєкт
- Національна гвардія України та поліцейський батальйон «Шторм» ПОПЕРЕДЖАЮТЬ: «На Бессарабії Одещини сепаратизму і безладів не буде!»
