= Luhansk Assault Regiment =

Luhansk Assault Regiment (2023–present) Luhansk-1 Battalion (2014–2023)
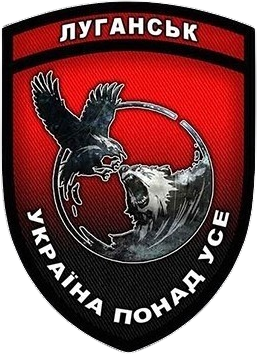
- Coat of arms of the regiment
- Active: May 2014 – present
- Allegiance: Ukraine
- Type: Light infantry
- Role: Offensive actions, Reconnaissance
- Size: ~500
- Garrison/HQ: Shchastia (2014-2022); Dnipro (2022-)
- Mottos: "Україна понад усе!" ("Ukraine above all!")
- Engagements: War in Donbas: Battle of Sievierodonetsk (2014); Russian invasion of Ukraine: Battle of Rubizhne; Battle of Severodonetsk (2022); Battle of Lysychansk; Battle of Bakhmut; Kharkiv counteroffensive; Battle of Chasiv Yar

Insignia
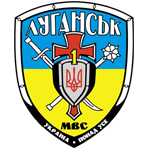
- Former Coat of Arms

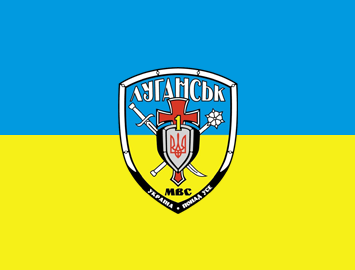
- Former flag

Luhansk Assault Regiment (Ukrainian: Штурмовий полк «Луганськ», romanized: Shturmkvyi polk “Luhansk”), formerly known as the Luhansk-1 Battalion, is a paramilitary unit of the Liut Brigade.

== History ==
=== Creation ===
In April 2014, the Head of the Ministry of Internal Affairs, Arsen Avakov, issued an order to form volunteer battalions from citizens loyal to Ukraine, especially in Eastern Ukraine. On May 8, 2014, the ministry officially created the "Luhansk-1" battalion from volunteer soldiers to fight in the raging war in Donbas.

When the battalion first created, around 80% were residents of Luhansk Oblast. On August 10, another 200 volunteers were added to the battalion.

According to the commander Artem Vitko, the battalion had only light arms in the early months, and only had basic equipment such as pistols, submachine guns, and light machine guns. In September, the battalion's equipment improved, adding weapons such as the RPG-7, AGS-17, and even BRDM-2 armored vehicles.

=== War in Donbas ===
On August 1, 2014, the battalion engaged in battle against pro-Russian militants in Severodonetsk, killing 15 of them. Later on August 27, "Luhansk-1" was part of a military operation to clear areas in Slovianoserbsk Raion, killing in total an estimate of 40 enemy soldiers.

On September 4, public activists donated an armored vehicle to the battalion to support their operations.

On September 8, the battalion captured enemy positions near the city of Pervomaisk.

On October 31, the battalion announced the search for Mykhailo Porechenkov because of his efforts in helping pro-Russian forces in Ukraine.

On May 20, 2020, Colonel Serhii Gubanov, the commander the battalion, received shrapnel wounds due to enemy shelling. He died while on the way to a hospital, near the village of Trokhizbenka.

In September 2020, the personnel of the battalion was called up due to fires from enemy shelling in Luhansk Oblast.

=== Russian invasion of Ukraine ===
On February 24, 2022, the Russian invasion of Ukraine began. The city of Shchastia, where the battalion was stationed in, immediately came under attack. However, their efforts were ultimately unsuccessful, and the city was soon occupied.

The battalion then moved to near the city of Severodonetsk to continue fighting. They also fought in nearby Kreminna and Rubizhne, before both also fell into Russian control.

Following eventual Ukrainian defeats at the battles at Severodonetsk and Lysychansk, the battalion was again redeployed, this time to help Ukrainian forces in the Battle of Bakhmut.

By September 2022, the battalion helped carry out the hugely successful Kharkiv counteroffensive, capturing villages including Balakliya, Verbivka, Novoselivka, and Stelmakhivka.

In March 2023, the Luhansk-1 Battalion became part of the Liut Brigade. Then in October, the battalion was expanded into a regiment, gaining the current name Luhansk Assault Regiment.

On December 28, 2023, Ukrainian president Volodymyr Zelenskyy praised the work of the Liut Brigade, which the regiment is a part of. He specifically praised lieutenant Ivan Krotov and captain Mykhailo Glavatskyi for their battlefield bravery.

In the spring of 2024, the regiment were part of the Ukrainian forces defending the city of Chasiv Yar against Russian assaults.
