= Zakhid Battalion (Ukraine) =

- Ukrainian: Батальйон міліції «Захід»
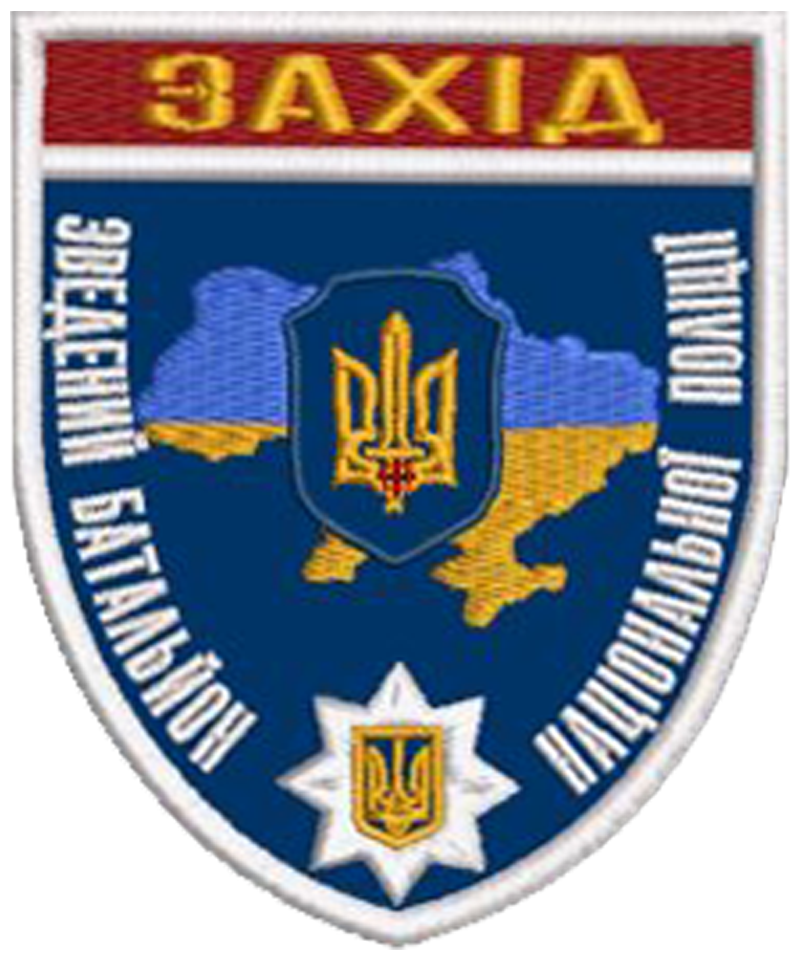
- Zakhid Battalion Insignia
- Active: 2022–present
- Country: Ukraine
- Branch: Ministry of Internal Affairs
- Type: Special Tasks Patrol Police
- Part of: Liut Brigade
- Garrison/HQ: Volyn Oblast
- Engagements: Russo-Ukrainian War: Russian invasion of Ukraine; Eastern Ukraine campaign; 2022 Kharkiv counteroffensive; Battle of Lyman; Battle of Vovchansk; Battle of Kupiansk

Commanders
- Current commander: Colonel Serhiy Kozak

Insignia
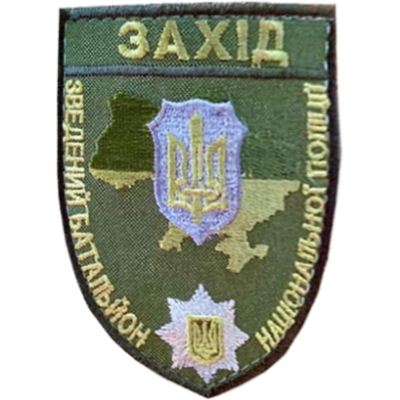
- Field Insignia

The Zakhid (West) Battalion is a battalion of the Liut Brigade of the Special Tasks Patrol Police subordinated to Ministry of Internal Affairs of Ukraine. The regiment is based in Volyn. It was established in 2022 in the wake of the Russian invasion of Ukraine and has, since then seen regular combat on the frontlines.

== History ==
It was established on 14 April 2022 from the police volunteers in Volyn Oblast following the Russian invasion of Ukraine and was deployed to take part in the Eastern Ukraine campaign especially in the 2022 Kharkiv counteroffensive. Firstly, the battalion's troops took part in the Battle of Pytomnyk, then Volokhiv Yar, Battle of Kupiansk and Battle of Lyman. Following the successful counteroffensive in Kharkiv Oblast, it was deployed to Donetsk Oblast taking part in offensive operations. Reconnaissance units of the battalion conducted reconnaissance and sabotage behind Russian lines destroyed four pieces of equipment, a Ural truck with personnel, two BMPs and one tank while the Anti-aircraft unit of the battalion shot down a Russian Su-25 near Kupiansk. The battalion's mortar platoon provided support to other units using 120-PM-43 mortars. Furthermore, an FPV drone strike group, an aerial reconnaissance detachment and an artillery group were also established in the battalion. The Battalion was also deployed to the area of Serebryansky forest. For some time in early 2023, the Battalion also operated in Luhansk Oblast. On 16 May 2023, the Battalion along with other units destroyed a Russian heavy tank after it conducted assaults on the battalion's positions for several days. In total, the battalion destroyed "hundreds" of pieces of equipment worth millions of dollars. On 9 April 2024, the FPV operators of the Battalion conducted a coordinated assault against multiple dugouts of Russian forces in Donetsk Oblast.

== Commanders ==
- Colonel Serhiy Kozak

== Structure ==
- Management & Headquarters
- 1st Company
- Svitiaz Company
- Bohdan Company

== Tasks ==
- Tasks in cooperation with other military units
- Countersabotage
- Counterinsurgency
- Artillery Support
- FPV drone support
- Behind the lines operations
- Reconnaissance operations
- Demining
- Anti-aircraft operations
- Shock and awe assaults
