= TM Militarist =

Militarist
- Native name: Мілітарист
- Industry: Retail
- Founded: 2005; 21 years ago
- Founder: Oleksandr Karasov
- Brands: M-TAC
- Website: militarist.ua

TM "Militarist" (Ukrainian: ТМ «Мілітарист») is a retailer of tactical equipment, clothing and outdoor gear. Initially a retailer of airsoft equipment, the company expanded into a wider range of military equipment following the Euromaidan and the War in Donbas.

The company is best known for its M-TAC line of tactical clothing, prominently worn by Ukrainian President Volodymyr Zelenskyy. However, the company has faced criticism due to its close association with the Azov movement.

== History ==
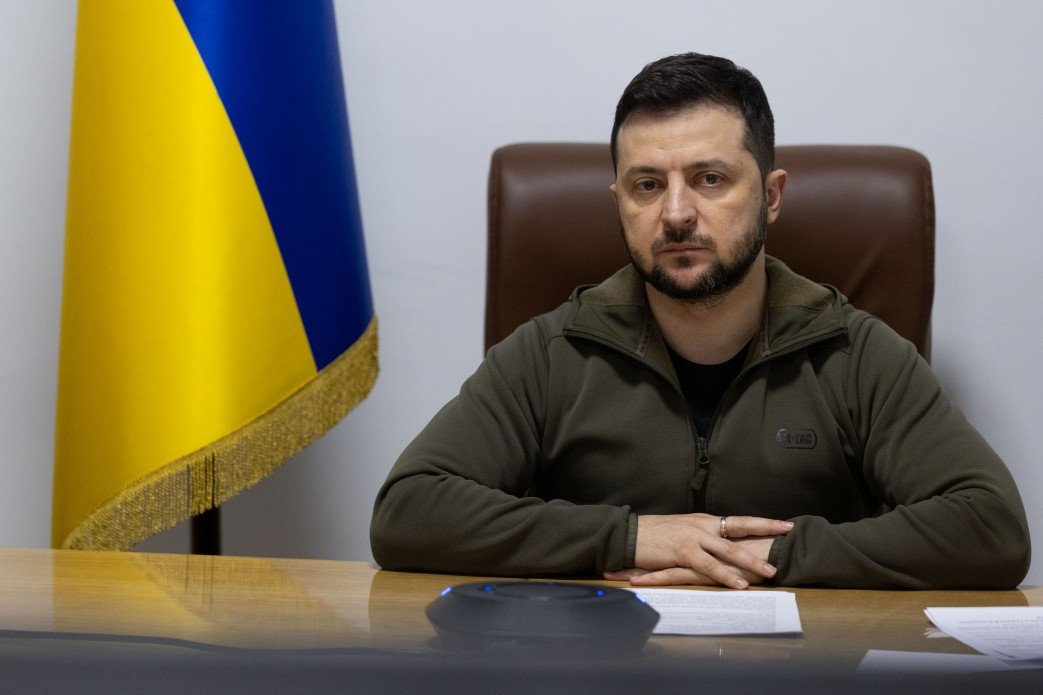
M-TAC Fleece jacket worn by Volodymyr Zelenskyy

The company was founded by Oleksandr Karasov and Denys Holovko.

In 2014, Militarist unveiled its own in-house brand labelled M-TAC, due to demand as a result of the deteriorating situation in the Donbass following the Maidan Revolution.

Subsequently, the brand has adopted the motto "Born of revolution, hardened by war".

On 16 February 2022, during a visit to Mariupol to oversee military exercises, Ukrainian president Volodymyr Zelenskyy was first seen wearing an olive green M-TAC jacket.

In May 2022, an M-TAC fleece jacket worn by Volodymyr Zelenskyy sold at a Christie's auction for £90,000 during the "Brave Ukraine" fundraiser in London, England. The auction was attended by Boris Johnson, the then prime minister of the United Kingdom, personally calling for much higher bids than the starting price.

M-TAC equipment is featured in the 2025 first-person shooter video game Battlefield 6.

== Controversies ==
M-TAC, along with the brand SvaStone and the Third Army Corps sponsor the controversial "Idu Na Vi" MMA competition held in Kyiv. The competition is organised by the singer of neo-Nazi band Sokyra Peruna, member of Right Sector, and owner of SvaStone Arseniy Bilodub.
