= National Police of Ukraine =

National police service of Ukraine

National Police of Ukraine Національна поліція України
- Patch of the National Police

- Emblem of the National Police

- Badge of the National Police

- Flag of the National Police
- Common name: Police of Ukraine
- Abbreviation: NPU
- Motto: To serve and protect (Служити та захищати)

Agency overview
- Formed: 3 July 2015; 11 years ago
- Preceding agency: Militsiya
- Employees: 130,000: 119,000 police officers; 11,000 civil personnel
- Annual budget: ₴35.6 billion (2022)

Jurisdictional structure
- National agency: Ukraine
- Operations jurisdiction: Ukraine
- Area: 603,629 km^{2}
- Population: 44 million (approx.)
- Governing body: Government of Ukraine
- Constituting instrument: Law on "National Police"
- General nature: Civilian police

Operational structure
- Overseen by: Ministry of Internal Affairs
- Headquarters: 10, Academician Bohomolets str., Kyiv, Ukraine
- Agency executive: Police General 2nd Rank Maksym Tsutskiridze (acting), Chief

Facilities
- Patrol cars: Toyota Prius; Hyundai Sonata; Renault Duster; Mitsubishi Outlander; Škoda Rapid; ZAZ Vida; Lada 110; VAZ-21099; UAZ Patriot; Lada Niva; VAZ 2107; ZAZ Forza; VAZ-2113; Fiat Tipo; VAZ-2114; VAZ-2115

Notables
- Anniversary: Police Day, July 4

Website
- npu.gov.ua

The National Police of Ukraine (Ukrainian: Націона́льна полі́ція Украї́ни, romanized: Natsionalna politsiia Ukrainy, IPA: [nɐts⁽ʲ⁾ioˈnɑlʲnɐ poˈl⁽ʲ⁾its⁽ʲ⁾ijɐ ʊkrɐˈjinɪ]; abbr. НПУ/NPU [ˌɛnpeˈu]), often simply referred to as the Politsiia (Поліція, 'Police'), is the national, and only, police service of Ukraine. It was formed on 3 July 2015, as part of the post-Euromaidan reforms launched by Ukrainian president Petro Poroshenko, to replace Ukraine's previous national police service, the Militsiya. On 7 November 2015, all the remaining militsiya were labelled "temporary acting" members of the National Police.

The agency is overseen by the Ministry of Internal Affairs.

== History ==
Prior to 3 July 2015, law enforcement in Ukraine was carried out directly by the Ministry of Internal Affairs as the militsiya. Plans to reform the ministry, which was widely known to be corrupt, had been advocated by various governments and parties, but these plans were never realised.

In the aftermath of the 2013–2014 Euromaidan movement and subsequent revolution, the need for reform was acknowledged by all parties. Parliamentary elections were held in October 2014, after which all five of the parties that formed the governing coalition pledged to reform the ministry and create a new national police service.

As part of the reforms, the Minister of Internal Affairs, Arsen Avakov, presented plans to reduce the number of police officers in Ukraine to 160,000 by the end of 2015. The reform plans started with the combination of the ministry's current State Auto Inspection (DAI) and the patrol service in the country's capital Kyiv in summer 2015. This new police patrol received funding from various countries. 2,000 new policemen and women, picked from 33,000 applicants, were recruited to initiate the new service in Kyiv. Officers were trained in the North American style by police officers from the United States and Canada.

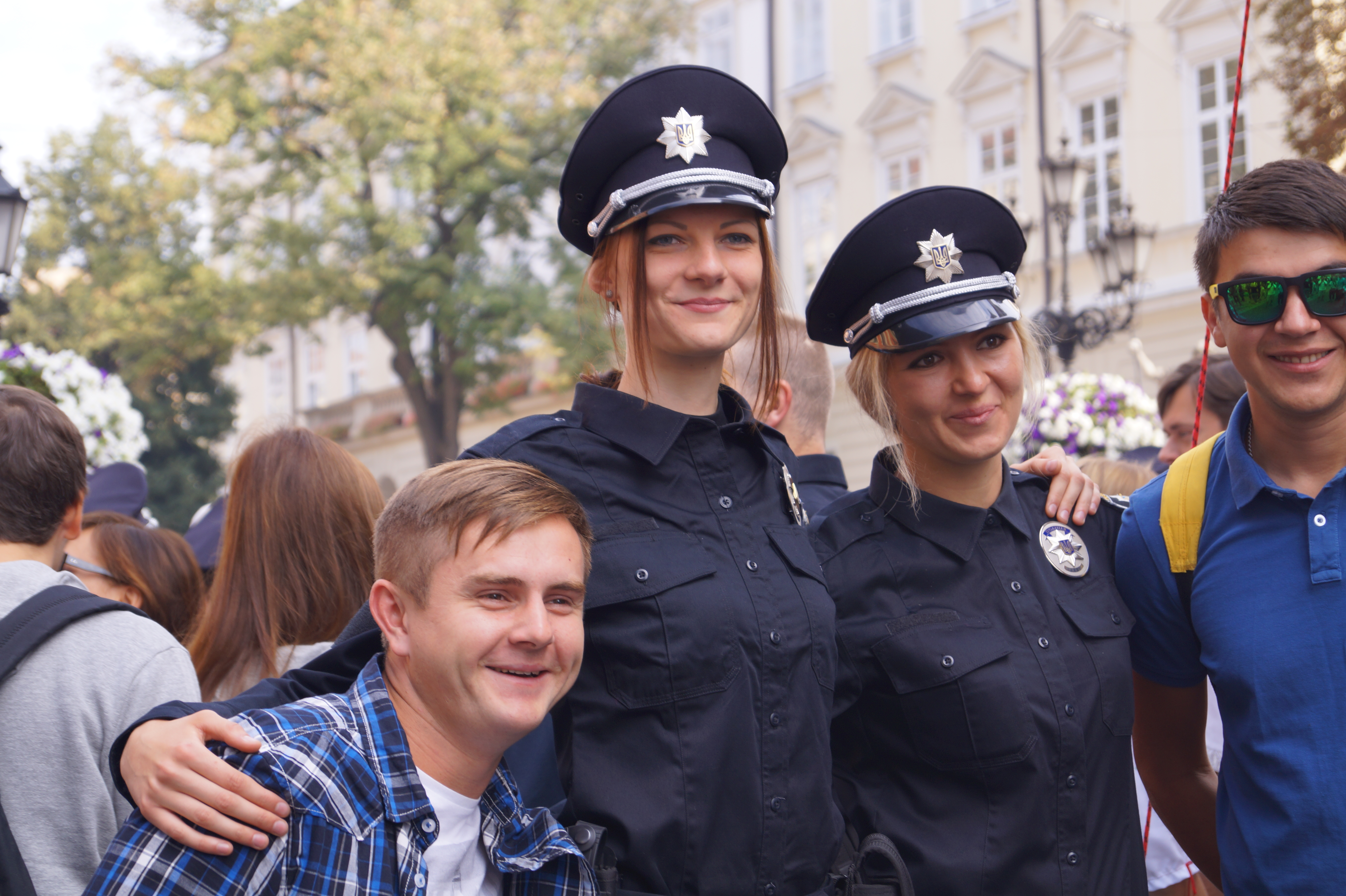
23 August 2015 launch of the new patrol police in Lviv

Upon the launch of Kyiv's new patrol police on 4 July 2015, the militsiya ceased all patrolling but continued working at precincts and administrative offices. After that the new police patrol was rolled out across Ukraine. The organisation was formally established as the National Police on 2 September 2015. By late September 2015, 2,000 new constables were on duty in Kyiv, 800 were on duty in Kharkiv and 1,700 were on duty in the cities of Odesa and Lviv. At this point, the militsiya was 152,000 officers strong, and continued to handle most policing across Ukraine. The basic salary of the new police force (almost $400 a month) is about three times as much the basic salary of the former militsiya; an attempt to decrease corruption.

The new National Police officially replaced the old militsiya on 7 November 2015. On that day, the remaining militsiya were labelled "temporarily acting" members of the National Police. The change allowed for them to become members of the National Police after "integrity checks", but they were only eligible if they met the age criteria and went through retraining. This transition period ended on 20 October 2016. In this transition period 26% of police commanders were dismissed and 4,400 policemen and policewomen demoted and the same number of people promoted.

Ukrayinska Pravda collected (from open sources) 64 crimes allegedly committed by Ukrainian police officers from 1 January 2020 until 30 May 2020. Cases ranged from extortion to rape to killings.

The NPU was assisted by the EU Advisory Mission Ukraine between 2017 and 2022 through the PRAVO Police Programme, implemented by the United Nations Office for Project Services (UNOPS), in an effort to modernize Ukrainian law enforcement to European standards.

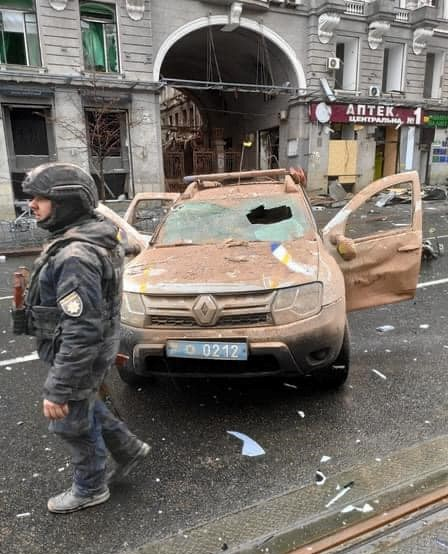
Policeman by a destroyed Renault Duster police car during the Battle of Kharkiv at the Russian invasion of Ukraine

On 14 February 2022, the National Police was transferred to combat alert, as a response to the Russian military buildup and threat of the invasion. The National Police and its tactical unit Rapid Operational Response Unit directly participated in hostilities against the invading Russian Armed Forces at the Kyiv offensive. As the 2022 Russian invasion of Ukraine progressed, the National Police helped in the war effort by maintaining law and order in Ukrainian-controlled areas, escorting prisoners, operating checkpoints, capturing infiltrators and detaining prisoners of war. By 1 March, 17 policemen were killed, 50 injured and 2 missing in action.

In February 2023, the MIA ordered the raising of 8 new assault brigades to support the Ukrainian war effort, one of those new brigades, the Liut Brigade, is the only one so far made up of officers, NCOs and constables of the NPU's Special Police. In 2024, three additional brigades were added as directly reporting under NPU Headquarters.

== Terminology ==
According to Professor Oleksandr Ponomariv of the Kyiv University's Institute of Journalism, the correct Ukrainian language term for a police officer is 'politsiyant' (поліціянт). This is in contrast to the term 'politseysky' (поліцейський), a loan word from the Russian language, commonly used to refer to an officer of the National Police.

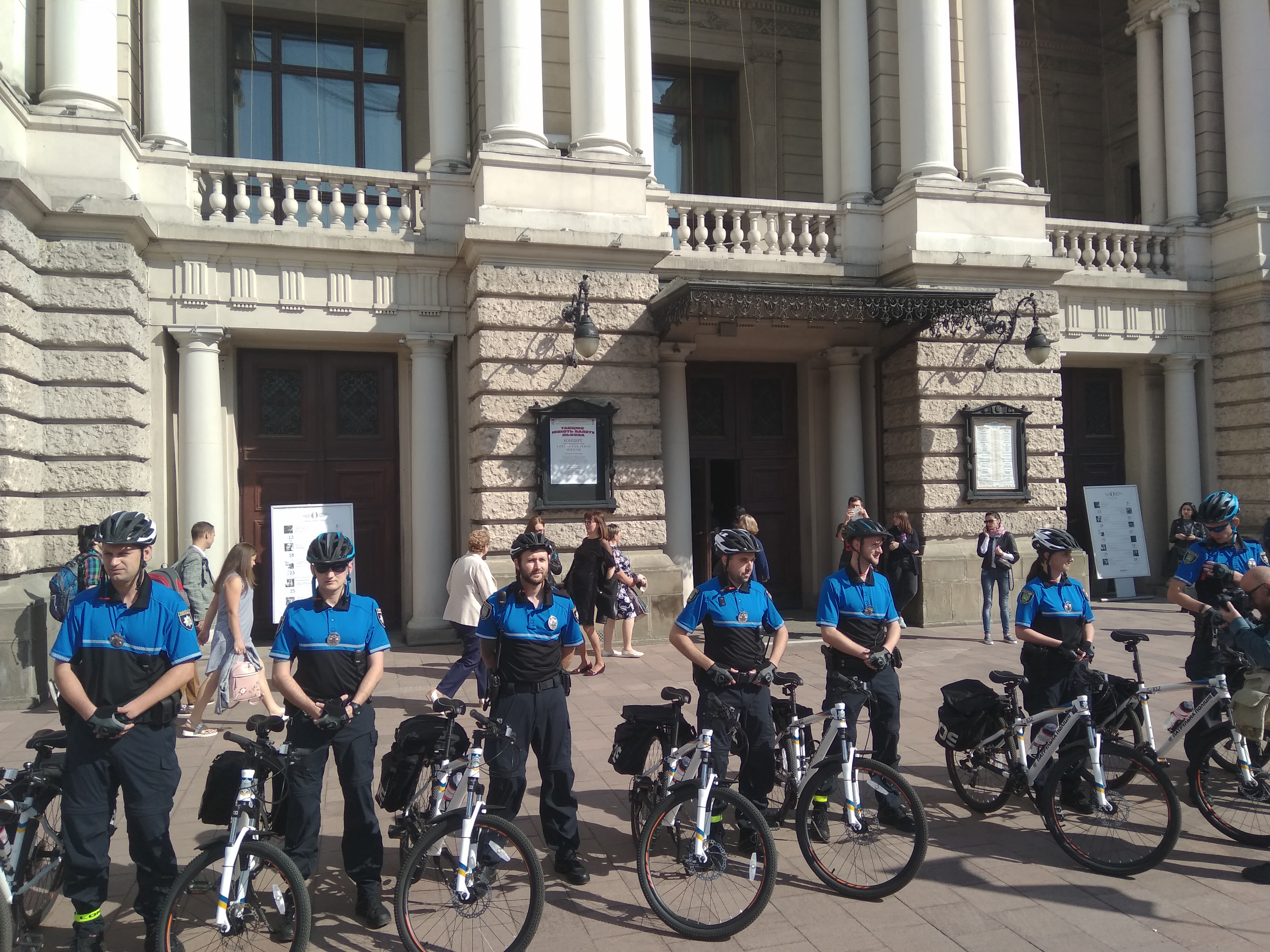
Bicycle police in Lviv

Ranks are rarely used by the public when addressing police officers in Ukraine; it is more common to hear the term Pan (Пан) (female - Pani (Пані) - Ukrainian for mister/miss - used to refer to police officers. Qualifying terms such as 'ofitser' (офіцер) or 'politseiskyi' (поліцейський) may also be used in conjunction with these forms of address.

== Structure and branches ==
The National Police is divided into a number of different services. Each force has internal subdivisions. This leaves the police service with a large number of specialised branches which can more specifically target certain types of crime and apply more expert knowledge in the investigation of cases relating to their area of policing. In addition to these specific groups, all police forces retain a majority of officers for the purpose of patrol duty and general law enforcement.

The police contains the following subdivisions:

- Criminal Police (Кримінальна поліція) – investigation and prevention of serious and violent crime in Ukraine
  - Department in the fight against drug-related crime
  - Department of Cyber Police (Кіберполіція, Департамент кіберполіції) – fighting against cyber crimes
  - Department of Economic Security
- Department of Patrol Police (Патрульна поліція) – general law enforcement operations, traffic policing and patrol duty (includes riot police divisions)
  - number of municipal administrations
- Department of Police Security (Поліція охорони) – Successor to the State Security Service (nothing to do with the State Security Administration)

In addition, the following special units exist:

- Special Police (Спеціальна поліція) – Tasked with keeping order in areas with special status and/or affected by natural or ecological disaster.
- Rapid Operational Response Unit (KORD) (Корпус Оперативно-Раптової Дії) – Tactical response unit, tasked with resolution of stand-off situations involving hostages and/or heavily armed suspects. Also tasked with providing a tactical support function to other divisional officers.
- Pre-trial Investigative Services (Органи досудового розслідування) – Representatives of the National Investigative Bureau, Tax Authorities and Security Services, tasked with investigating crime.

=== Shoulder patches of the regional police subdivisions ===

Territorial force		Date of formation
Oblast / Municipality	Police force	Date of formation
City of Kyiv	Kyiv Patrol Police	4 July 2015
City of Lviv	Lviv Patrol Police	23 August 2015
City of Odesa	Odesa Patrol Police	25 August 2015
City of Kharkiv	Kharkiv Patrol Police	26 September 2015
Kyiv Oblast	Kyiv Oblast Patrol Police	7 October 2015
City of Uzhhorod	Uzhhorod Patrol Police	29 November 2015
City of Mukacheve	Mukacheve Patrol Police	29 November 2015
City of Mykolaiv	Mykolaiv Patrol Police	6 December 2015
City of Lutsk	Lutsk Patrol Police	19 December 2015
City of Khmelnytskyi	Khmelnytskyi Patrol Police	26 December 2015
City of Dnipro	Dnipro Patrol Police	17 January 2016
City of Ivano-Frankivsk	Ivano-Frankivsk Patrol Police	30 January 2016
City of Kherson	Kherson Patrol Police	8 February 2016
City of Chernihiv	Chernihiv Patrol Police	19 February 2016
City of Vinnytsia	Vinnytsia Patrol Police	22 February 2016
City of Kremenchuk	Kremenchuk Patrol Police	27 February 2016
City of Cherkasy	Cherkasy Patrol Police	1 March 2016
City of Poltava	Poltava Patrol Police	5 March 2016
City of Ternopil	Ternopil Patrol Police	12 March 2016
City of Zhytomyr	Zhytomyr Patrol Police	22 March 2016
City of Boryspil	Boryspil Patrol Police	24 March 2016
City of Chernivtsi	Chernivtsi Patrol Police	27 March 2016
City of Zaporizhia	Zaporizhia Patrol Police	16 April 2016
City of Rivne	Rivne Patrol Police	19 April 2016
City of Kropyvnytskyi	Kropyvnytskyi Patrol Police	28 April 2016
City of Sumy	Sumy Patrol Police	12 May 2016
City of Kramatorsk	Kramatorsk Patrol Police	14 May 2016
City of Sloviansk	Sloviansk Patrol Police	14 May 2016
City of Kryvyi Rih	Kryvyi Rih Patrol Police	19 May 2016
Sievierodonetsk	Sievierodonetsk Patrol Police	22 May 2016
Lysychansk	Lysychansk Patrol Police	22 May 2016
Rubizhne	Rubizhne Patrol Police	22 May 2016
Mariupol	Mariupol Patrol Police	30 May 2016

== Rank hierarchy ==
=== Officers ===
Rank group	General / flag officers			Senior officers			Junior officers
	Staff officers			Supervisory officers			Senior officers
National Police of Ukraine
National Police of Ukraine	Генерал поліції 1-го рангу Henerál políciji 1-ho rángu	Генерал поліції 2-го рангу Henerál políciji 2-ho rángu	Генерал поліції 3-го рангу Henerál políciji 3-ho rángu	Полковник; Polkovnyk	Підполковник; Pidpolkovnyk	Майор; Maior	Капітан; Kapitan	Старший лейтенант Starshyi leitenant	Лейтенант; Leitenant	Молодший лейтенант Molodshyi leitenant
National Police of Ukraine	General 1st rank	General 2nd rank	General 3rd rank	Colonel	Lieutenant colonel	Major	Kapitan	Senior lieutenant	Lieutenant	Junior lieutenant

=== Junior officers ===
Rank group	Senior NCOs	Junior NCOs		Enlisted
	Junior officers
National Police of Ukraine
National Police of Ukraine	Старший сержант Starshyi serzhant	Сержант; Serzhant	Капрал; Kaprál	Рядовий; Rjadovýj
National Police of Ukraine	Senior sergeant	Sergeant	Corporal	Private

== Equipment ==
Officers wear a camera that is constantly monitoring their performances. The resulting videos are posted on social media and broadcast on a reality TV show.

=== Vehicles ===
==== Land vehicles ====
Picture	Make and model	Country of origin	Use	Quantity	Notes
	Ataman D093S	Ukraine	Police bus		
	Chery Tiggo 2	China	Patrol car		
	Chevrolet Cobalt	Uzbekistan	Patrol car		
	Chevrolet Niva	Russia	Patrol car		
Fiat Tipo Security Police Ukraine	Fiat Tipo	Turkey	Patrol car	20	Bought for Kyiv security police
	Hyundai Elantra	South Korea	Driver's education		
	Hyundai Sonata	South Korea	Patrol car	110	Highway patrol car. Former taxis operated under the SkyTaxi brand by Kyiv's Boryspil International Airport. Owned by the state and transferred to the police as surplus to SkyTaxi's requirements.
	Hyundai Tucson	South Korea	Patrol car		
	Isuzu D-Max	Japan	Patrol car	38	Procured for the police in the Western Ukrainian region of Volyn.
	Lada Niva	Russia	Patrol car	9	Were bought by Poltava Police in 2016.
	Mazda CX-5	Japan	Patrol car		
	Mitsubishi L200	Japan	Criminalist lab		
Mitsubishi Outlander Ukraine Police	Mitsubishi Outlander	Japan	Patrol car	635	Were bought by in 2017.
	Peugeot 301	France	Patrol car		
Ukraine Police Raketa-Futong FT 150	Raketa-Futong FT 150	(China); China Ukraine	Police motorcycle		
	Renault Dokker	Morocco	Police van	192	Badged as Renault and based on the Dacia Dokker. Assembled in Morocco.
	Renault Duster	Romania	Patrol car	140+	Badged as Renault and based on the Dacia Duster. Assembled in Romania.
	Renault Kangoo	France	Police van		
	Renault Mégane	France	Patrol car		
	Renault Trafic	France	Police van		
	Škoda Octavia	(Czech Republic); Czech Republic Ukraine	Patrol car		
	Škoda Kodiaq	(Czech Republic); Czech Republic Ukraine	Patrol car		
	Škoda Kodiaq	(Czech Republic); Czech Republic Ukraine	Unmarked patrol car		Phantom patrol
Ukrainian police car Skoda Rapid	Škoda Rapid	(Czech Republic); Czech Republic Ukraine	Patrol car	400	First cars delivered in 2018. Assembled in Ukraine.
	Suzuki SV650	Japan	Police motorcycle		
	Tesla Model Y	United States	Patrol car		
	Toyota Corolla	Japan	Patrol car		
	Toyota Hilux	Japan	Criminalist lab		
	Toyota Land Cruiser	Japan	Patrol car		
	Toyota Prius	Japan	Patrol car	1,568	General purpose patrol car. Supplied by Japan in return for Ukrainian emissions permits under the Kyoto Protocol.
	UAZ Patriot	Russia	Patrol car	>20	Were bought before 2014 by former Ukrainian Militsya
	Volkswagen Amarok	Germany	Patrol car	25+	Used by frontline units to evacuate civilians, delivering humanitarian aid, and for demining operations during wartime
	Volkswagen Crafter	Germany	Police van		
	Volkswagen Jetta	Germany	Patrol car		bought in 2019
	Volkswagen Polo	Germany	Patrol car		
	Volkswagen Tiguan	Germany	Patrol car		
	Volkswagen Transporter	Germany	Police van		
	ZAZ Forza	(China); China Ukraine	Patrol car		
	ZAZ Vida	(South Korea); South Korea Ukraine	Patrol car		

==== Aircraft ====
Picture	Make and model	Country of origin	Use	Quantity	Notes
	Eurocopter EC145	France	Helicopter	10	
	Robinson R44	United States	Helicopter	1	Is used to maintain public order during mass events

== Police Day ==
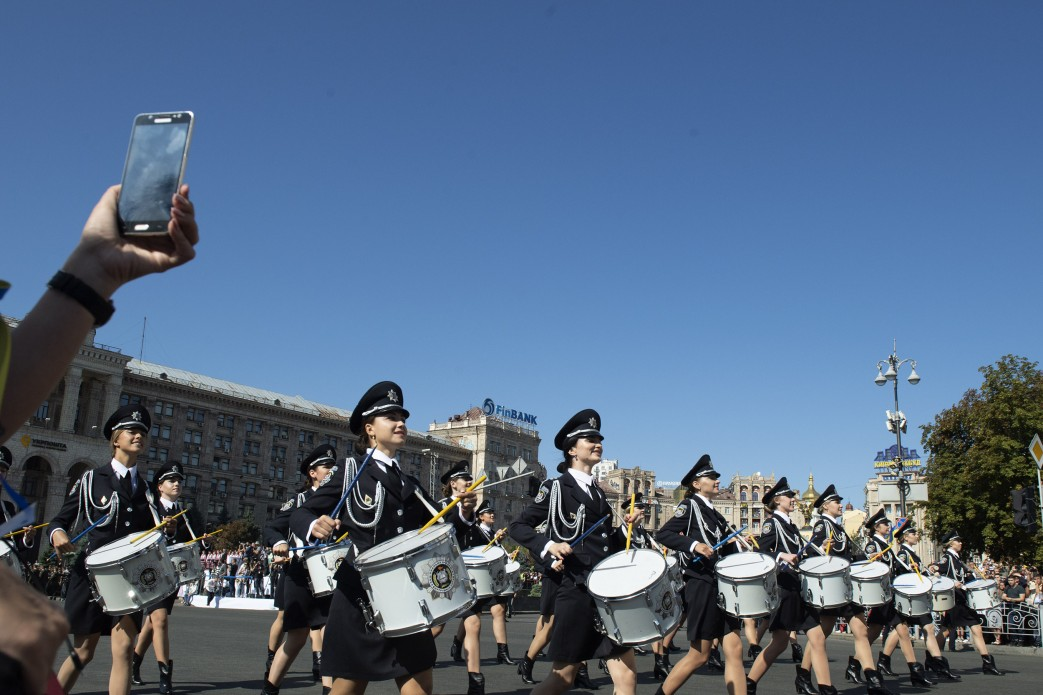
A corps of drums from the National Police.

National Police Day (День Націона́льної полі́ції, Denʹ Nacionálʹnoyi políciyi, Ukrainian pronunciation: [dɛnʲ nɐt͡s⁽ʲ⁾ioˈnɑlʲnoji poˈl⁽ʲ⁾it͡s⁽ʲ⁾iji]) on 4 July is the professional holiday of the Ukrainian Police. It commemorates the suspension of law enforcement duties by the Militsiya and the establishment of the National Police of Ukraine. It also coincides with the first oath of patrol policemen on Kyiv's Sofia Square. The holiday was introduced and first celebrated on 4 August 2015 and was celebrated on that day ever since until President Petro Poroshenko, by decree on 4 April 2018, declared that the holiday should be celebrated annually on 4 July and become a national holiday.

== See also ==
- Law enforcement in Ukraine
- Internal Troops of Ukraine
- National Guard of Ukraine
