= 45th Operational Regiment (Ukraine) =

45th Operational Assignment Regiment
- 45-й полк оперативного призначення НГ (Ukrainian)
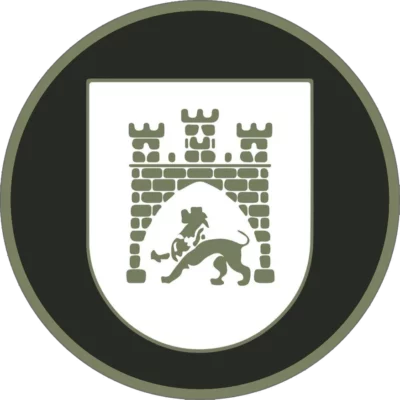
- Regiment Insignia
- Founded: 1992
- Country: Ukraine
- Branch: Internal Troops of Ukraine (1992–2014); National Guard of Ukraine
- Type: Regiment
- Garrison/HQ: Lviv
- Nickname: Lviv Regiment
- Patron: Lieutenant Colonel Oleksandr Krasitskyi
- Engagements: Russo-Ukrainian war: War in Donbas; Russian invasion of Ukraine

Commanders
- Current commander: Colonel Palaguta Oleksandr Oleksiyovych
- Notable commanders: Colonel Stepan Ivanovich Logush

Insignia
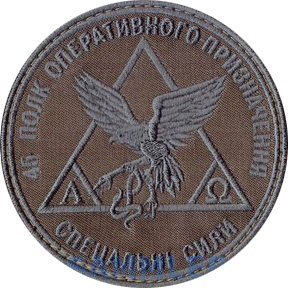
- Former Insignia

The 45th Operational Assignment Lviv Regiment "Lieutenant Colonel Oleksandr Krasitskyi" is a regiment of the National Guard of Ukraine. It was established on the basis of the 10th Operational Regiment of the Soviet Army in 1992. It has taken part in multiple engagements throughout the Russo-Ukrainian war. It is currently headquartered in Lviv City.

== History ==
In 1992, the 10th Operational Ryymnik Order of Kutuzov, Order of Bohdan Khmelnytskyi and the Order of the Red Star Regiment of the Soviet Armed Forces swore allegiance to Ukraine becoming a part of the National Guard of Ukraine. In 1998, it became a part of the 14th Brigade. In January 2000, it was reformed into the 45th Operational Regiment of the Internal Troops of Ukraine.

It was deployed to maintain public order during the 2004 Ukrainian presidential election in Kyiv Oblast amidst allegations of a fraudulent election.

In 2007, the personnel of the unit protected public order when a train carrying phosphorus was derailed in the village of Ozhidiv, Lviv Oblast and was involved in the disaster control operations.

It was then transferred to the National Guard of Ukraine after the disestablishment of the Internal Troops of Ukraine.

After the start of the fighting in Donbas, the soldiers of the regiment guarded military bases, served in ATO zone, at checkpoints in Sloviansk, Popasna, Debaltseve, and took part in battles for Novodruzhesk, Krymske, Toretsk, and Pervomaisk in three deployments. They also cooperated with Azov Brigade, Dnipro-1 Regiment, 14th Chervona Kalyna Brigade, Donbas Battalion, 40th NG Regiment, 5th NG Brigade,27th NG Brigade, Lviv Battalion and Peacemaker Battalion amongst others. Initially the brigade was deployed to Donetsk, and from there to Mariupol to take part in the 2014 Battle of Mariupol. On the morning of 9 May 2014, the commander of the Lviv regiment, Colonel Valery Smolov, received information that people in balaclavas carrying weaponry were attacking the Mariupol city police department and the first floor of the department had already been captured by the separatists, so multiple units of the National Guard of Ukraine, including the 45th regiment were sent as reinforcement to help the besieged police officers. The National Guardsmen were moving in two groups, when they went to Georgiivska Street, the separatists attacked them from automatic rifles and machine guns killing a soldier of the regiment (Shlemkevich Bohdan Vasyliovych) and wounding four. The regiment participated in the Battle of Debaltseve and on 7 August 2014, the Ukrainian troops including those of the brigade were ambushed near Debaltseve killing a soldier of the regiment (Maksym Dmytrovych Kochura).

On 29 August 2019, following the collapse of a four-story building in Drohobych, around 60 personnel of the regiment were involved in search and rescue operations. In March 2019, the regiment received the honorary name of "Lieutenant Colonel Oleksandr Krasitskyi", a Lieutenant Colonel of the Ukrainian Galician Army who participated in the Ukrainian War of Independence.

The regiment saw combat during the Russian invasion of Ukraine from the early days of the invasion but however endured few casualties. On 2 May 2024 a soldier of the regiment (Yury Samoilichenko) was killed whilst serving on the frontlines.

== Structure ==
- 45th Operational Assignment Regiment
  - Management and Headquarters
  - 1st Patrol Battalion
    - 1st Patrol Company
    - 2nd Patrol Company
    - 3rd Patrol Company
  - 2nd Patrol Battalion:
    - 1st Patrol Company
    - 2nd Patrol Company
    - 3rd Patrol Company
  - Automobile Company
  - Combat and Logistical Support company
  - Canine group
  - Training Grounds

== Commanders ==
- Colonel Stepan Ivanovich Logush (2014-2019)
- Colonel Palaguta Oleksandr Oleksiyovych (2019-)

== Sources ==
- Школярі Львова побували в гостях у нацгвардійців
