= 3rd Operational Brigade =

3rd Operational Spartan Brigade
- 3-тя бригада оперативного призначення НГ (Ukrainian)
- Brigade Insignia
- Founded: 2014
- Country: Ukraine
- Allegiance: Ministry of Internal Affairs
- Branch: National Guard of Ukraine
- Type: Brigade
- Part of: 2nd Khartiia Corps
- Garrison/HQ: Kharkiv
- Nickname: Spartans
- Patron: Petro Bolbochan
- Engagements: Russo-Ukrainian war: War in Donbass; Battle of Debaltseve; Russian invasion of Ukraine; Battle of Kharkiv; 2022 Kharkiv counteroffensive; Eastern Ukraine campaign; Battle of Bakhmut; 2023 Ukrainian counteroffensive
- Decorations: For Courage and Bravery

Commanders
- Current commander: Lieutenant Colonel Oleksiy Vasyliovych Khilchenko

Insignia
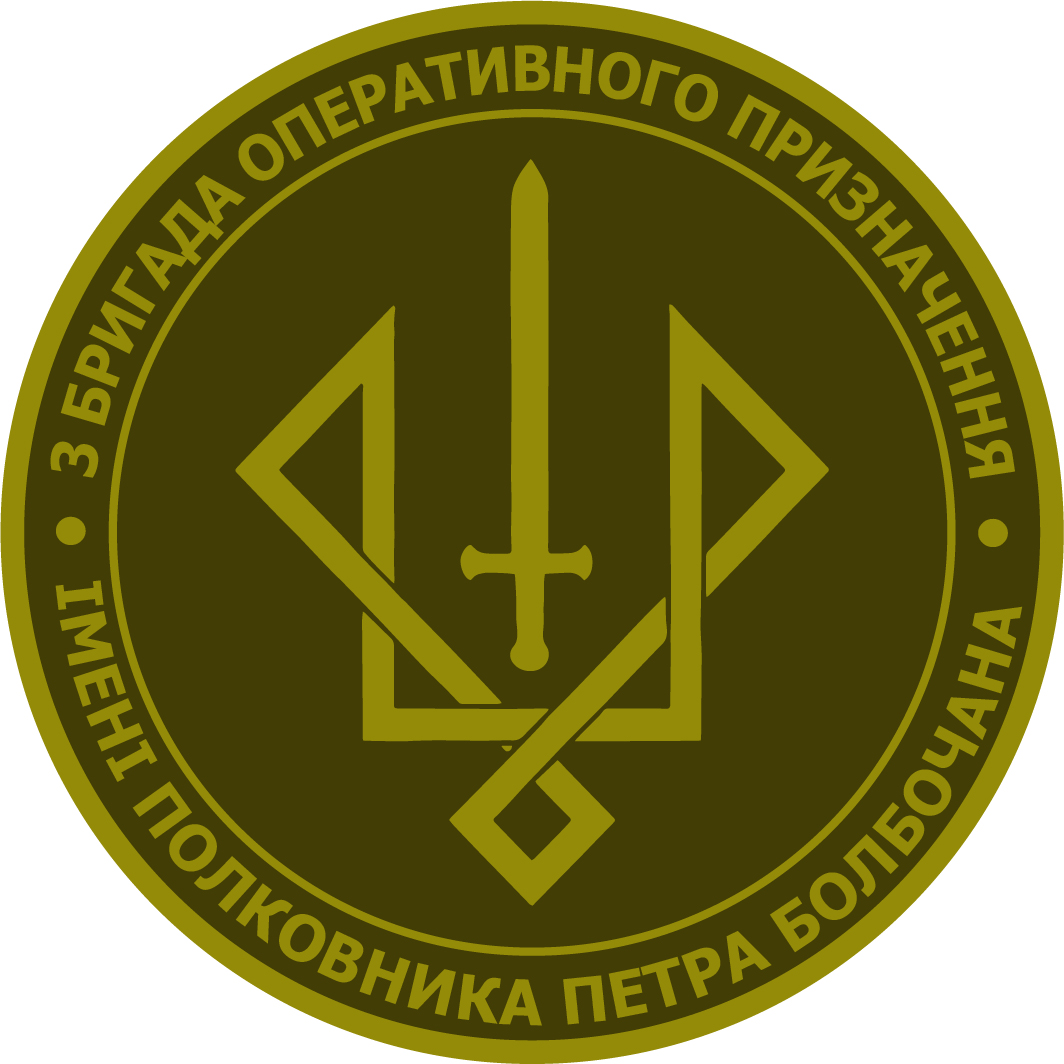
- Field Insignia

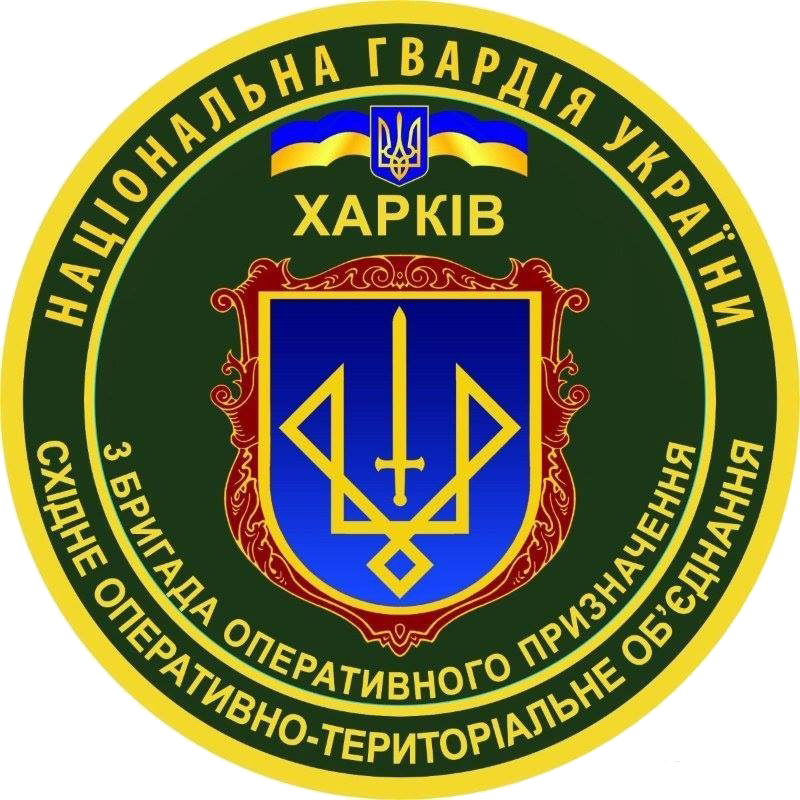
- Former Insignia

The 3rd Operational Assignment Spartan Brigade "Petro Bolbochan" is a brigade of the National Guard of Ukraine. It is a part of the Ukrainian Offensive Guard and was established in 2014 in Kharkiv. It has taken part in multiple engagements throughout the Russo-Ukrainian war and is currently deployed on the frontlines.

== History ==
The brigade was created by order of the Ministry of Internal Affairs on 11 June 2014 amidst the backdrop of the War in Donbass. It was established in the Kharkiv Oblast and its staffing was completed in October 2014.

The brigade took part in the 2014 Battle of Bakhmut carrying out supply missions during which on 25 December 2014, during a routine combat mission to deliver fuel and ammunition, a KrAZ-255 truck of the brigade was hit by separatist explosives in the Popasna Raion killing a soldier of the brigade (Andrunyk Petro Petrovych) and seriously wounding another.

The brigade took part in the Battle of Debaltseve in February 2015, on 14 February 2015, the brigade was sent to Debaltseve to carry out the task of repelling a separatist attack. On 18 February, the brigade along with other Ukrainian forces withdrew from Debaltseve when it was ambushed and fired upon by small arms and heavy artillery. Four soldiers of the brigade (Bohdan Ihorovych Vovk, Khoroshkovsky Vyacheslav Dmytrovych, Shepherd Serhii Petrovych, and Vasyl Mykolayovych Hrytsenko) were killed in the ambush. Furthermore, a medic of the brigade (Orest Petryshyn) was also captured by the separatist forces during the ambush. On 19 June 2015, a soldier of the Brigade (Yury Viktorovych Sokol) was killed in Volnovakha under undisclosed conditions.

On 20 January 2016, a soldier of the Brigade (Oleksiy Oleksiyovych Lisanets) was killed whilst on duty under unknown circumstances. The brigade continued to operate in Luhansk Oblast in the second line of defense throughout 2016.

On 2 April 2017, a soldier of the brigade (Vitaliy Viktorovych Slautskyi) was killed whilst serving in Donetsk Oblast. On 27 September 2017, the calculation of the combined anti-aircraft artillery battery of the brigade won the competition for the best calculation of ZU-23-2 between different branches of the Armed Forces of Ukraine.

At the beginning of September 2018, a new training complex "Team Building" was established and went operational at the base of the brigade.

During the War in Donbass, the brigade had seen deployments in Debaltseve, Mariupol, Popasna and Krymske.

On 14 October 2020, the brigade was awarded the honorary name of Petro Bolbochan, a Colonel of the UPR who led the successful Crimea Operation (1918) against the Bolsheviks.

From the beginning of the Russian invasion of Ukraine in 2022, the brigade has participated in the Battle of Kharkiv destroying four Russian tanks and a Su-25 aircraft capturing its pilot, on the first day of the full-scale invasion. On February 24, 2022, on the first day of Russia's large-scale invasion of Ukraine, the brigade's conscripts destroyed an enemy column on the district road near Kharkiv for which an officer (Yevgeny Olegovych Gromadskyi) was awarded the Hero of Ukraine. The brigade defended three roads of the city: to Pyatikhatky, to Tsirkuny, and to Vovchansk. On 27 February, two soldiers of the brigade (Rayenko Volodymyr Andreyovych and Maksym Oleksandrovych Kharchenko) were killed in a battle with Russians in Kharkiv and another soldier of the brigade (Vladyslav Viktorovych Shubin) was killed the next day. On 1 March 2022, four soldiers of the brigade (Maksymchyk Volodymyr Volodymyrovy, Vasyl Ivanovych Konets, Berezenko Vladyslav Leonidovych. and Artem Valeriyovych Sarkisian) were killed in the battle of Kharkiv. On 7 March 2022, three soldiers of the brigade (Viktor Anatoliyovych Pecherskyi, Viktor Serhiyovych and Oleksandr Vasylovich Shekhovtsov) were killed in Kharkiv Oblast. Another soldier of the brigade (Samorok Vladyslav Oleksandrovych) was killed on 11 March and two more (Diranchuk Vladyslav Olegovych and Nagorniuk Vyacheslav Petrovych) on 15 March. On 24 March 2022, another soldier of the brigade (Dovhan Mykola Yuriyovych) was killed in action on the frontlines. Following the successful defense of Kharkiv, the brigade participated in the liberation of Mala Rohan, Tsyrkuny and Kutuzivka, Kharkiv Oblast. During these battles, the brigade destroyed about 2 companies of Russian servicemen, 2 tanks, 8 BMPs, 2 ZU-23-2 installations, 22 vehicles and a Multiple Rocket Launcher. On 7 April 2022, a soldier of the brigade (Denis Valeryovych Babichev) was killed in combat in Kharkiv Oblast. Then the brigade took part in the 2022 Kharkiv counteroffensive, engaging the Russians in the battles for Slatine, Kozacha Lopan, Dementiivka. On 4 July 2022, a soldier of the brigade (Oleksandr Ivanovych Pazushchan) died as a result of wounds sustained on the battlefield and another soldier (Vitaly Yuriyovych Bukhanchenko) was killed in battle on 11 July. On 27 July 2022, the brigade was awarded the honorary award "For Courage and Bravery". On 29 August 2022, a soldier of the brigade (Ihor Oleksandrovych Pugach) was killed in combat in Kherson Oblast and was posthumously awarded the Hero of Ukraine the highest military award for Ukrainian personnel.

In January 2023, the brigade was deployed to Bakhmut to strengthen the defensive lines during the Battle of Bakhmut. The commander of the brigade's second company (Koval Vitaly Borisovych) was killed on 6 January during the battle and was awarded the Hero of Ukraine. Another soldier of the brigade (Yevhen Udovyka) was killed in action on 26 January 2023. During the battle a sniper of the brigade (Mykyta Stanislavovich Kolisnyk) distinguished himself by personally killing 39 Russian soldiers including a group of paratroopers in an armored personnel carrier as well as destroying a BTR-82A and a BMP whilst saving the lives of wounded. On 15 January 2023, during the Battle of Bakhmut, the sniper (Mykyta Stanislavovich Kolisnyk) was besieged but still managed to kill eleven Russian soldiers and destroyed two BMPs but was mortally wounded leading to his death, for his actions during the battle he was posthumously awarded the Hero of Ukraine, which is the highest military award for Ukrainian personnel. In March 2023, the brigade was still taking part in the Battle of Bakhmut. On 1 June 2023, an officer of the brigade (Mykola Dmytrovych Bomko) was killed in combat in Spirne and was posthumously awarded the Hero of Ukraine. Since July 2023, the brigade operated in Zaporizhzhia Oblast for the 2023 Ukrainian counteroffensive destroying multiple pieces of Russian equipment. During the counteroffensive, on 19 August 2023, a soldier of the brigade (Eduard Basiuk) was killed in action in Robotyne as a result of artillery strikes. On 17 October 2023, a soldier of the brigade (Mykola Mykolayovych) died in a hospital in Kharkiv from the wounds sustained on the frontlines. On 28 October 2023, Russian forces attempted to storm a stronghold, in Robotyne during which an officer of the brigade (Andriy Ihorovych Syadristy) destroyed a Russian infantry fighting vehicle killing nine Russian soldiers and evacuated two wounded Ukrainian soldiers from the battlefield. While returning to the battlefield, his vehicle was hit by a Russian ATGM killing him. He was awarded the Hero of Ukraine for his actions. The brigade served in Novoprokpivka in November 2023, and on 5 November 2023, a soldier (Artem Oleksandrovich Zabolotny) was killed there and another soldier (Volchuk Volodymyr Volodymyrovych) on 8 November 2023. In 2023, the brigade operated in Kharkiv Oblast, Luhansk Oblast, Donetsk Oblast and Zaporizhzhia Oblast. As part of the recruiting campaign, the brigade was named "Spartan" in 2023.

The brigade continued to operate in Robotyne and on 7 February 2024, a soldier of the brigade (Serhiy Montresor) was killed in Robotyne, followed by another soldier (Demianchuk Ruslan Anatoliyovych) on 11 February, another soldier (Ruslan Ivakhnenko) on 17 February and an officer (Pankov Serhii Vitaliyovych) on 23 March 2024.

== Commanders ==
- Colonel Osipov Serhii Volodymyrovych (2014–2015)
- Colonel Dmytro Viktorovych Protsenko (2015–2019)
- Colonel Oleksandr Anatoliyovych Buravkov (2019–2022)
- Colonel Oleksandr Sergeyevich Pivnenko (2022–2023)
- Lieutenant Colonel Oleksiy Vasyliovych Khilchenko (2023-)

== Structure ==
- 1st Operational Battalion
- 2nd Operational Battalion
- 3rd Operational Battalion
- 4th Operational Battalion
- Anti-aircraft Missile Division
- Medical Center
- Tank Company
- Special Intelligence and Reconnaissance Company
- Support Battalion
- Reserve Rifle Battalion

== Sources ==
- 3-я бригада оперативного призначення імені полковника Петра Болбочана
- У військовій частині 3017 Східного оперативно-територіального об'єднання НГУ нагородили нагрудним знаком «Гідність та Честь» керівника землевпорядної служби Харківщини Євгена Оберемка
- Військову частину 3017 перевірили за 2015 навчальний рік
- У Нацгвардії тривають навчання підрозділів протиповітряної оборони
- У Східному оперативно-територіальному об'єднанні триває інспектування
- Військова частина 3017 використовує польовий комплекс для ремонту техніки
- Присяга у військовій частині 3017
- Зенітники Нацгвардії і їх «дівчата»
- Як у військовій частині 3017 відкрили погруддя полковнику Петру Болбочану // ВІДЕО
