= Zoloti Vorota Company (Ukraine) =

- Компанія Золоті Ворота (Ukrainian)
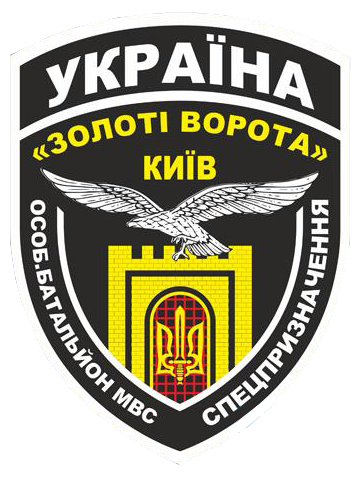
- Zoloti Vorota Company Insignia
- Active: 2014–present
- Country: Ukraine
- Branch: Ministry of Internal Affairs
- Type: Special Tasks Patrol Police
- Size: 250-300
- Part of: Kyiv Regiment
- Garrison/HQ: Kyiv Oblast
- Engagements: Russo-Ukrainian War; War in Donbas; Battle of Shchastia; 2022 Russian invasion of Ukraine; Northern Ukraine campaign; Battle of Kyiv; Eastern Ukraine campaign

Commanders
- Current commander: V.A. Provolovskyi

The Third Company of the Special-Purpose Kyiv Regiment (Ukrainian: 3-ша рота полку особливого призначення «Київ», romanized: 3-sha rota polku osoblyvoho pryznachennia «Kyiv»), formerly known as the Zoloti Vorota Battalion (Ukrainian: Батальйон Золоті Ворота, lit. 'Batalion «Golden Gate»') is a battalion of the Kyiv Regiment of the National Police of Ukraine's Special Police Forces. It was established in 2014 and since then, has seen regular combat.

== History ==
The battalion included mostly the participants of Euromaidan including Mykhailo Havryliuk, with the commander being Shvalya Mykola. On 3 July 2014, the battalion, together with other units took part in the security of the Verkhovna Rada of Ukraine during consideration of changes to the Constitution of Ukraine. At the end of July 2014, the fighters of the battalion declared that they were not allowed into the ATO zone. On 9 August 2014, the battalion was deployed to the ATO zone. On 10 August 3014, the battalion took part in clearing operations in Krasnyi Yar. On 11 August 2014, the 2nd platoon of the Battalion, composed of 29 personnel, was sent to the aid of the 128th Mountain Infantry Brigade to Lutuhyne and Lenino for direct combat operations. It performed clearing operations in surrounding villages and duty at checkpoints ensuring the safe passage of the 80th Brigade to the Luhansk Airport and the exit of the 80th Air Assault Brigade from the airport at the end of August. The Battalion also prepared for an assault on Luhansk but the plan was scrapped following the entry of Russian Armed Forces at the front. On 12 August 2014, the battalion came under artillery fire. From 14 to 22 August 2014, the battalion cleared villages near Luhansk. On 17 August 2014, the battalion was attacked by separatists in Sabivka. Battalion commander, Mykola Shval and intelligence officer, Oleh Byshevsky were severely wounded. On August 25, the main forces of the battalion retreated to Svatove while its second Platoon retreated to Novoaidar. The 2nd platoon continued to carry out the combat operations in Shchastya, serving at the checkpoints, conducting patrols and covert operations on the canal and countersabotage at the Grechaninove-Oknino road. The 2nd Platoon withdrew from its positions only after completing its mission on 29–30 September 2014. On 18 October 2014, soldiers of the battalion, together with soldiers of the Armed Forces of Ukraine took part in the capture of Krymske. At the end of November 2014, Mykola Shval was removed from his post due to his health condition after being wounded and the new battalion commander V. Provolovsky took up duties on 25 November 2014. On 16 June 2015, near Lopaskyno, a detachment of the Battalion was ambushed and engaged in a battle with a sabotage and reconnaissance group of separatists as a result of which three fighters of the battalion were wounded. In late 2015, it became a part of the Kyiv Regiment as its 3rd Company.

== Commanders ==
- Mykola Mykolayovych Shvalya (2014)
- V.A. Provolovskyi (2014-)
