= Battle of Sevastopol (1918) =

Battle during the Crimean Operation (1918)

- Part of the Crimean Operation (1918)
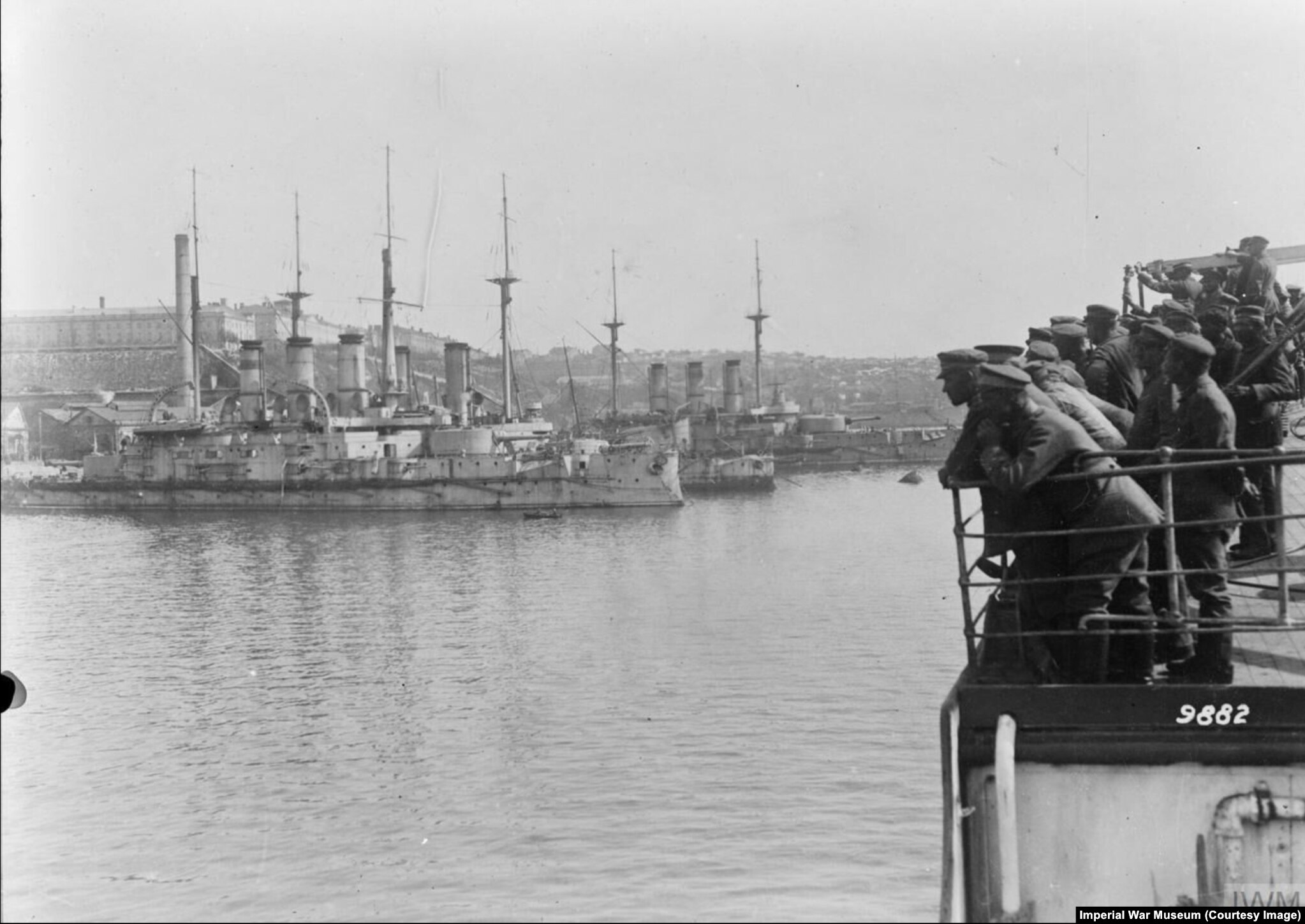
- German troops looking at newly captured Russian ships in Sevastopol
Date	19 April 1918 – 1 May 1918
Location	Sevastopol, Russian Empire
Result	German-Ukrainian victory

Belligerents
Germany; Ukraine	Bolsheviks

Commanders and leaders
(German Empire) Robert von Kosch (Ukrainian People's Republic) Petro Bolbochan	Unknown

Units involved
German 15th Division; Zaporozhian Corps	Unknown

The Battle of Sevastopol (1918) took place during the Crimean Operation of World War I.
