= Bars (special unit) =

Special police unit of Ukraine

14th Special Purpose Brigade "Bars"
- Полк спеціального призначення «Барс»
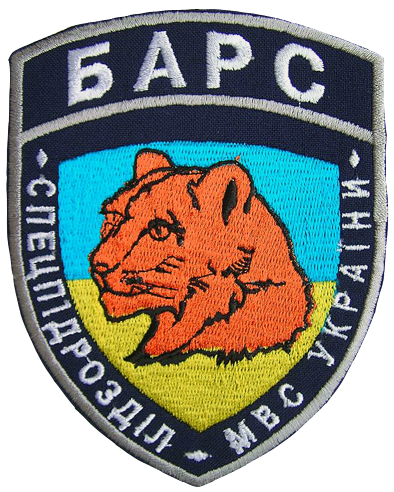
- Active: 1994–2014
- Disbanded: 2014
- Allegiance: Ukraine
- Type: Special forces
- Role: Protection of public order
- Size: 500
- Part of: Internal Troops of Ukraine
- Garrison/HQ: Novi Petrivtsi
- Engagements: Euromaidan; Russo-Ukrainian War; War in Donbas
- Commander: Colonel Volodymyr Hryhorovych Musienko

The 14th Special Purpose Regiment "Bars" is a special unit of the Internal Troops of Ukraine, which existed from 1994 to 2014. In July 2014, the 1st Operational Brigade of the National Guard was created on the basis of the formation.

== Composition ==
"Bars" included the "Omega" special-purpose and counter-terrorism unit, a highly disciplined, mobile unit that is highly versatile and has combat experience. "Bars" units are able to solve law enforcement tasks of any degree of complexity: from neutralizing armed criminals to eliminating the consequences of man-made and ecological accidents. The brigade was stationed in the city of Irpin, Kyiv Oblast. The training center "Barsu" was located near Kyiv in the forest in the village of Novi Petrivtsi. The number of "Bars" is more than 500 servicemen. The personnel is distinguished by a black uniform. The heraldic symbol and name of this formation of power structures is based on the snow leopard. The "Bars" brigade was subordinated to the Northern Territorial Command of the National Guard of the Ministry of Internal Affairs of Ukraine.

== History ==
The special purpose brigade (bSpP) "Bars" originates from the special purpose brigade (Russian: ОБрСН) of the Internal Troops of the Ministry of Internal Affairs of the Ukrainian SSR (Kyiv), military unit No. 3027 (military unit 3027). On 13 November 1990, according to the order of the Minister of Internal Affairs of the Ukrainian SSR No. 421, special purpose units (SpP) began to be created in the GUVP system. Their main task was to suppress mass disturbances - protesting students, political dissenters, etc., as well as participating in special law enforcement activities.

In 1994, three special purpose regiments were formed as part of the Internal Troops of Ukraine: "Bars" (Kyiv), "Jaguar" (Kalynivka), and "Cheetah" (Zaporizhzhia). In May 2004, the fourth special purpose regiment "Tiger" was established in the Autonomous Republic of Crimea. Military unit 3027 of the updated Internal Troops of Ukraine was created on 27 March 1994 as the 7th Special Purpose Regiment (pSpP VV) by Resolution of the Cabinet of Ministers of Ukraine dated 11 March 1994 No. 158 "On the creation of special purpose units within the VV and the Ministry of Internal Affairs of Ukraine"; place of deployment — village Vita Postova, Kyiv-Svyatoshyn Raion, Kyiv Oblast. In 1995, the regiment moved to the city of Irpin, Kyiv region. An aviation unit of twelve servicemen, based at the Zhuliany airfield, was added to the structure of the special forces regiment "Bars". On 16 December 2002, by order of the Ministry of Internal Affairs of Ukraine No. 1314, the 7th Special Purpose Regiment of the Internal Affairs Ministry of Ukraine was reformatted into the 14th Special Purpose brigade "Bars" of the Internal Affairs Ministry of Ukraine. By the order of the commander of the Internal Troops of 7 March 2003 No. 83, an elite unit was formed within the brigade - the special purpose unit "Omega", military unit 3027, which was staffed exclusively by officers and assigned to perform the most difficult tasks.

Based in Irpin since 1999, the Bars special purpose brigade has built a solid training base in the village of Novi Petrivtsi. The base composes of a barracks, office premises, a psychological rehabilitation office, a training class, a medical diagnostic center, sports halls for hand-to-hand combat and athleticism. For special training classes and to improve combat skills, the department's employees built an assault obstacle course.

=== Euromaidan ===
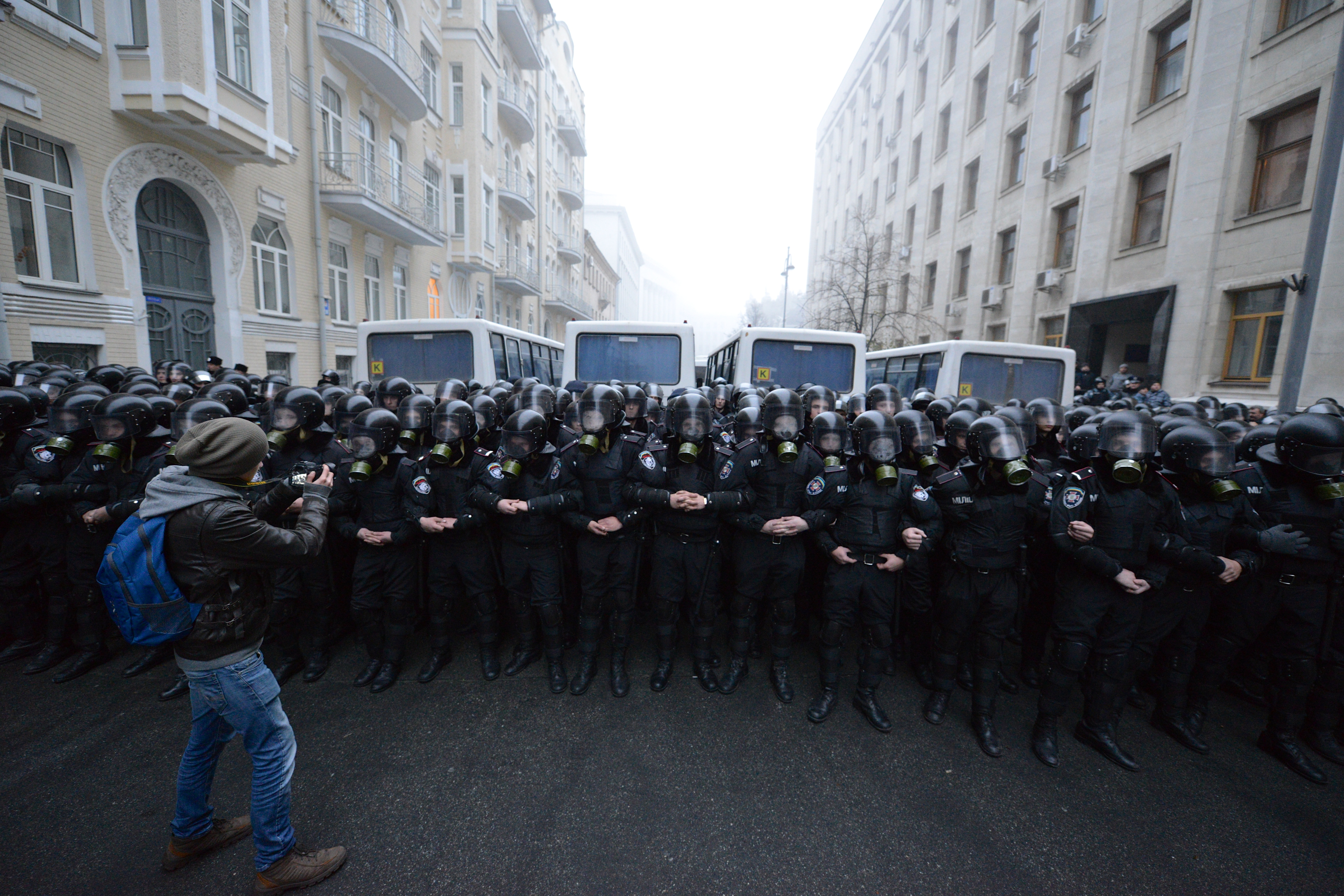
The "Bars" unit blocks access to the Presidential Administration in Kyiv, 24 November 2013

In 2014, the "Bars" brigade as part of the Internal Troops was involved in suppressing Euromaidan activists.

=== Participation in the ATO ===
Subsequently, the special unit was integrated into the restored National Guard and took an active part in the liberation of Ukrainian cities and villages from separatists during the anti-terrorist operation in the Donbas, among the dead was Lieutenant Volodymyr Serhiyovych Kravchuk.

== Commanders ==
- Colonel Oleh Demyanovych Harchu – commander of the "Bars" brigade, 2008–2011;
- Colonel Vasyl Vasyliovych Chumak – commander of military unit 3027, 2011–2013;
- Colonel Oleksandr Romanovych Lilyavsky – commander of military unit 3027 from 2013 to 2014;
- Colonel Volodymyr Hryhorovych Musienko – commander of military unit 3027 in 2014.

== Equipment ==
Vepr, Elf-2, AKM, AK-74, AK-47, Makarov, APS, PBS, Fort-12, Fort-17, Fort-21.03, SVD, SKS, RPK-74, KS-23, PP-90, PP-91, AKS-74U, AK-74M, AKMS, RPK, PC, TSK, RPG-7V, AK-103, OSV-96, AGS-30, 6G-30, GSh-18, stun and tear gas grenades of the "Dawn" and "Plumya" types, combat knives, trench shovels, police shields, police batons, etc.
