= Kyiv Regiment (Ukraine) =

- Ukrainian: Київський полк
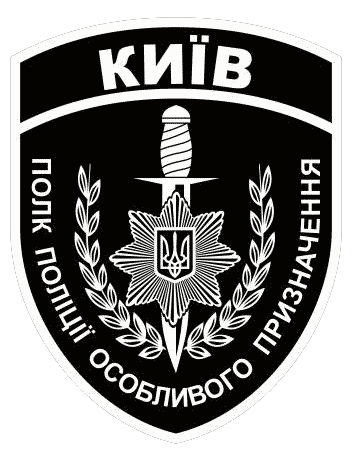
- Kyiv Regiment Insignia
- Active: 2015–present
- Country: Ukraine
- Branch: Ministry of Internal Affairs
- Type: Special Tasks Patrol Police
- Size: 600
- Garrison/HQ: Kyiv Oblast
- Engagements: Russo-Ukrainian War; War in Donbass; First Battle of Avdiivka; 2022 Russian invasion of Ukraine; Northern Ukraine campaign; Battle of Kyiv; Battle of Irpin; Eastern Ukraine campaign; 2022 Kharkiv counteroffensive; Second Battle of Avdiivka; Battle of Bakhmut

Commanders
- Current commander: Lieutenant Colonel Vitaly Volodymyrovych Satarenko

The Kyiv Police Regiment is a regiment of the Special Tasks Patrol Police subordinated to Ministry of Internal Affairs of Ukraine. The regiment is based in Kyiv. It was established in 2014 following the start of the War in Donbass and has, since then, seen regular combat on the frontlines.

== History ==
It was established in Kyiv on 21 October 2015 consisting of "Kyiv-1" Battalion, "Kyiv-2" Battalion, "Golden Gate" Battalion, "Sich" Battalion and "St. Mary" Battalion. It conducted law enforcement operations in Kyiv Oblast especially on 28 and 29 December 2015. On the night of 23–24 March 2016, the Kyiv Regiment saw its first combat against separatists in Avdiivka. On 14 April 2016, the regiment guarded strategic sites in Avdiivka. On 22 June 2016, the "St. Mary" battalion was disbanded and its fighters were transferred to other units. On 9 July 2016, it was deployed to Stanytsia Luhansk where they discovered another drug den, 520 opium poppy bushes and 124 hemp bushes were discovered and destroyed. On 11 July 2016, a monument was opened for a volunteer soldier of the Russo-Ukrainian war in Kyiv by the regiment. In the summer of 2016, the regiment constantly carried out active counter-subversive operations in Avdiivka. On 31 January 2017, the curator of the unit, Yevhen Deidei reported that 50 personnel of the regiment were performing operations in Avdiivka, which had been shelled by separatists for three consecutive days, they protected private property from criminals, evacuated civilians to bomb shelters, and carried out rescue operations as well as collecting aid from the citizens of Kyiv to help the civilians in Avdiivka. On 25 October 2017, a soldier of the regiment (Kushnir Ruslan Valerievich) was killed as a result of a bomb explosion in Kyiv.

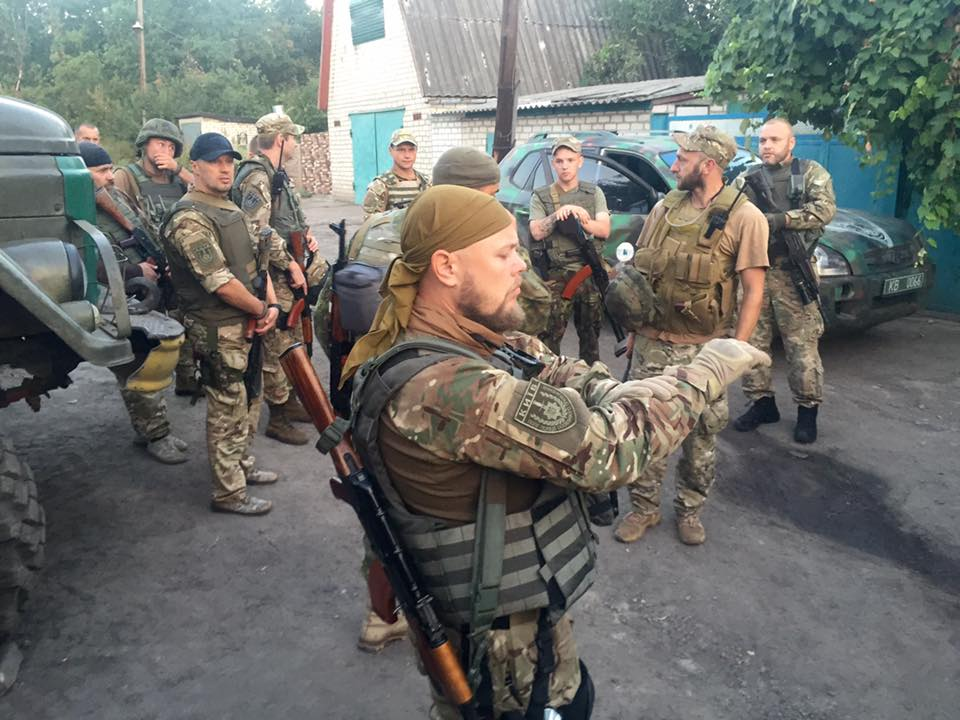
Kyiv Regiment operating in Avdiivka

During February–March 2022, the regiment took part in the Northern Ukraine campaign especially the Battle of Kyiv. On 25 February 2022, a soldier of the 4th "Sich" company (Tsvila Iryna Volodymyrivna) was killed while repelling a tank attack during the Battle of Irpin. Following the victory in the Battle of Kyiv, the regiment was deployed to fight in the Battle of Avdiivka during which on 25 June 2022, a soldier of the regiment (Berezhnyk Ivan Mykolayovych) was killed in combat. On 16 September 2022, it was deployed to fight in the 2022 Kharkiv counteroffensive conducting assault operations in Verbivka and Balakliya. It was then deployed to Donetsk Oblast and during this deployment a soldier of the regiment (Oleksandr Oleksandrovich Lemak) was killed in combat on 21 October 2022 and another (Grama Ruslan) was killed on 18 March 2023 during the Battle of Bakhmut.

== Tasks ==
Main tasks and functions of the regiment are:

- Law enforcement
- Operations in the ATO zone regarding counterterrorism independently or in coordination with Security Service of Ukraine, other units of the National Police of Ukraine, the National Guard of Ukraine, Armed Forces of Ukraine, state authorities, local government bodies, to ensure public safety and order in streets, squares, parks, squares, stadiums, train stations, airports, sea and river ports, other public places and during public gatherings.
- Safety of persons under protection, their family members, the protection of administrative and state buildings and other strategic sites.
- Protecting convicts from life threats.
- Escort and transport of convicted criminals.
- Ensuring public order and safety in the area around the presence of high level officials.
- Search and rescue operations during natural disasters, accidents, fires and disasters.
- Performing designated tasks during martial law or state of emergency, in the zone of emergency ecological situation or war.

== Structure ==
The structure of the regiment is as follows:

- 1st "Kyiv-1" Company
- 2nd "Kyiv-2" Company
- 3rd "Zoloti Vorota" Company
- 4th "Sich" Company

== Equipment ==
=== Armament ===
The regiment operates large-caliber machine guns, automatic grenade launchers, disposable anti-tank hand grenade launchers, including predominately the DShK and Degtyaryov machine guns produced from 1950s-1970s.

=== Uniform ===
Most combat variations of their uniforms vary considerably being purchased on private expense but the most common is the standard black uniform of the Ministry of Internal Affairs of Ukraine.

== Commanders ==
- Bohdan Oleksandrovych (2015–2016)
- Satarenko Vitaly Volodymyrovych (2016-)

== Sources ==
- Полк особливого призначення «Київ» (Facebook)
- Полк Київ. Тактичні навчання.
