= Petro Bolbochan =

Ukrainian colonel (1883–1919)

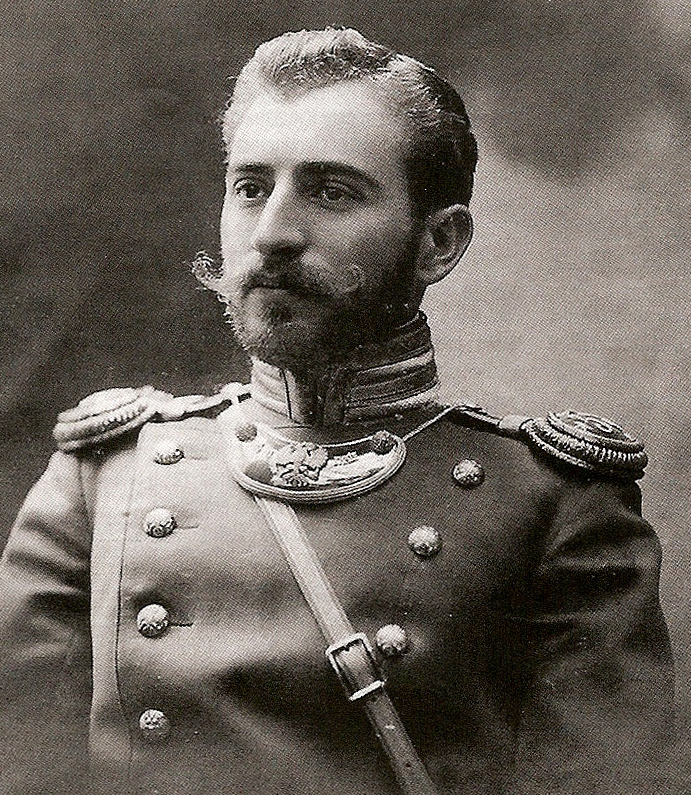
- Native name: Петро Федорович Болбочан
- Born: 5 October 1883; Yarivka, Bessarabia Governorate, Russian Empire (now Ukraine)
- Died: 28 June 1919 (aged 35) Balyn, Ukrainian People's Republic
- Allegiance: Russian Empire; Ukrainian People's Republic
- Branch: Imperial Russian Army; Ukrainian People's Army
- Service years: 1909–1917; 1917–1919
- Commands: Second group of the Separate Zaporizhia Detachment; Crimean group of the Army of the Ukrainian People's Republic
- Conflicts: World War I; Lake Naroch Offensive; Crimea Operation; Battle of Sevastopol (1918); Ukrainian War of Independence; Soviet–Ukrainian War

Petro Fedorovych Bolbochan (Note: Ukrainian: Петро́ Фе́дорович Болбоча́н; Romanian: Petru Bolbocean) (5 October [O.S. 17 October] 1883 – 28 June 1919) was a Ukrainian military figure of Moldovan descent who was a colonel of the Ukrainian People's Army. Recognized as a good organizer and masterful strategist, he led Ukrainian forces in the 1918 Crimea Operation against the Bolsheviks, leading to the establishment of Ukrainian control over the peninsula and transfer of the Black Sea Fleet to Ukraine. From November 1918 to January 1919, during the Soviet-Ukrainian War, Bolbochan headed the defense of Northeastern Ukraine.

== Early life and career ==
Petro Fedorovych Bolbochan was born on 5 October 1883 in the village of Yarivka (Romanian: Hâjdeul de Sus), in the Bessarabia Governorate of the Russian Empire (now in the Chernivtsi Oblast of Ukraine) in the family of a Moldovan Orthodox priest, Fedir Oleksiyovych Bolbochan. Fedir, also from the family of a priest, was born in the village of Lipnik, in the Bessarabia Governorate (now Lipnic, Moldova). His name came from the Romanian word Bulboacă.

In 1905, he graduated from the Chișinău Theological Seminary. In 1909, he graduated from the Chuhuiv Infantry Junker School. In the same year he married Yelisavetgrad-born Maria Popescu. During the First World War, he was an officer of in Imperial Russian Army's 38th Tobolsk Regiment.

== Ukrainian People's Army ==
After the Russian Revolution, Bolbochan actively began organizing Ukrainian military units and helped form the 1st Bohdan Khmelnytsky Ukrainian Regiment from Russian army units. On 22 November 1917, Bolbochan was appointed commander of the regiment. In early December 1917 the 1st Ukrainian Regiment was liquidated by order of the Bolsheviks. Despite Bolbochan's resistance, the regiment was disarmed and the barracks blown up, killing a number of soldiers.

In January 1918 Bolbochan created a new military formation that became the 2nd Zaporizhzhia infantry group, later regiment. On 2 March 1918, the 2nd Zaporozhian Regiment, led by Bolbochan, was the first to enter Kyiv, ahead of the Imperial German Army, and took control of the city without Bolshevik resistance. The Zaporozhians then took control of Hrebinka, Lubny, Romodan, and Poltava. He collaborated with the Ukrainian Party of Socialist Independists.

As commander of the 1st Zaporozhian Division, part of the 1st Zaporozhian Corps, Bolbochan commanded Ukrainian forces subordinate to the Central Rada during the Crimean campaign of 1918. During the period of Hetmanate he commanded the 2nd Zaporozhian Regiment. On the order of Directory, in late 1918 Bolbochan headed Zaporozhian Corps, serving as commander of all Ukrainian troops in Left-bank Ukraine. From November 1918 to January 1919, Bolbochan headed the defense of Northeastern Ukraine.

Following the withdrawal of Ukrainian forces to Right-bank Ukraine, Bolbochan was relieved from all command posts. During that time he started criticizing the inconsistent policies of the Ukrainian People's Republic's government. On 9 June 1919 Bolbochan made an unsanctioned attempt to take command over troops of Zaporozhian Corps stationed in Proskuriv, but failed. As a result, he was convicted by a court-martial and shot near the railway station of Balyn in Podillia. At the time of his death, he was 35 years old.

== Legacy ==
A street in Pechersk District of Kyiv was named after Bolbochan in 2015.

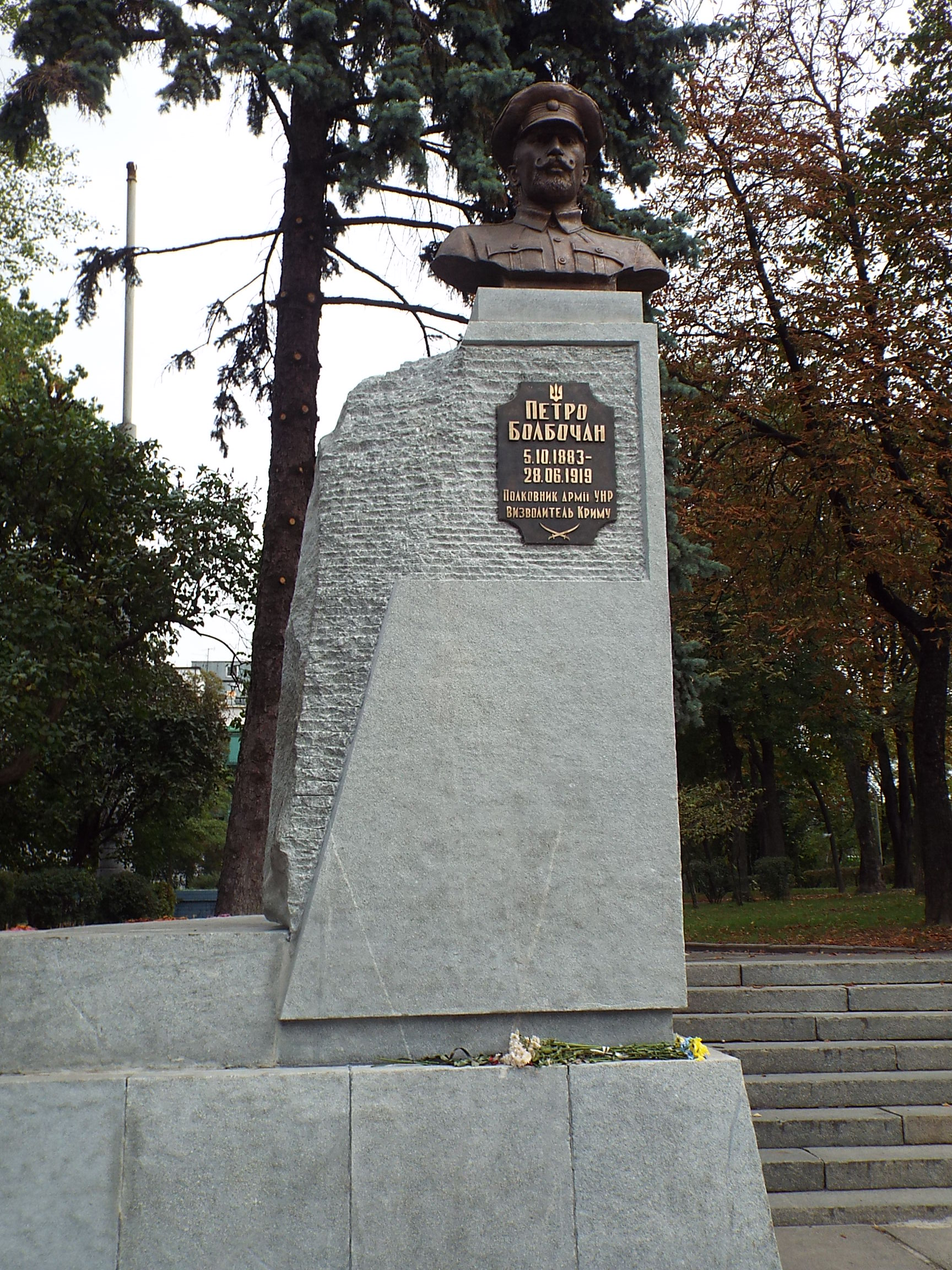
Statue of Bolbochan in Kyiv

A bust in his memory was unveiled in Petro Bolbochan Square at 86 Sichovykh Striltsiv Street in Kyiv's Shevchenkivskyi District on 5 October 2020. At the time it was the first monumental sculpture in his honor in Ukraine and the world.

The 3rd Operational Brigade (Ukraine) is named in honor of Bolbochan.
