= Sich Battalion =

Ukrainian nationalist paramilitary battalion

- Ukrainian: батальйон патрульної служби міліції особливого призначення "Сiч"
- Active: June 2014 – present
- Country: Ukraine
- Branch: VO Svoboda (2014–2015); Ministry of Internal Affairs (2015–present)
- Type: Special Tasks Patrol Police (2015–present)
- Part of: Kyiv Regiment
- Engagements: War in Donbas: Battle of Marinka; Battle of Avdiivka; Russo-Ukrainian war (2022–present)

The Sich Battalion (Ukrainian: Батальйон "Сiч"), officially known as the 4th Sich Company of the Kyiv Regiment (Note: The battalion was inducted into the Special Tasks Patrol Police on 21 December 2015.) (4-та рота «Січ» полку «Київ», 4-ta rota "Sich" polku "Kyiv"), is a Ukrainian special police battalion consisting of volunteers from Kyiv. The unit was formed in June 2014 by volunteers from the far-right party Svoboda at the start of the war in Donbas.

In 2015, the Sich Battalion cut their ties with Svoboda after a ruling by the Ministry of Internal Affairs banned people registered in political parties from enlisting in their units. The unit was reformed as the 4th Company of the Kyiv Regiment.

== History ==
=== Foundation and early operations ===
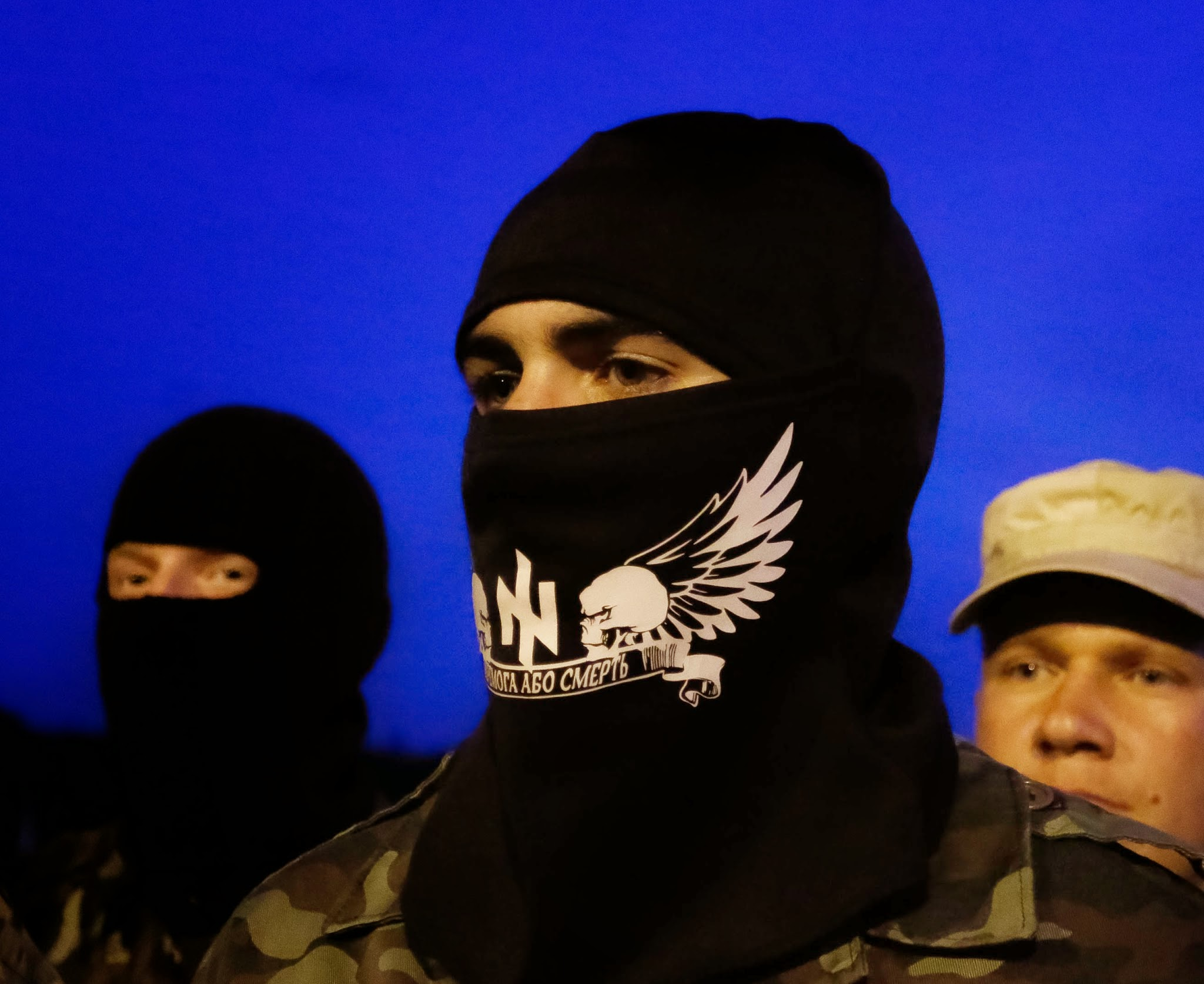
Member of the Sich Battalion wearing a balaclava with the National Idea symbol.

The Sich Battalion was formed by the far-right Svoboda party in June 2014. The unit is one of several Ukrainian paramilitary volunteer battalions formed at the start of the war in Donbas in 2014, along with the Svyatyi Mykolai Battalion and the Donbas Battalion, to fight against pro-Russian separatists in the Donbas region of Ukraine. The Sich Battalion officially became an active unit of Ukraine's Ministry of Internal Affairs following its oath taking ceremony on 26 August 2014, and is composed of around 50 volunteers, some of whom have prior military service. Like other volunteer units, Sich Battalion members underwent two months of basic training before activation. They began engaging separatist forces with minimal training or equipment. While the Sich Battalion was much smaller than other volunteer units, it was designed for the specific purpose of combating insurgents in the 2014 pro-Russian unrest in Ukraine.

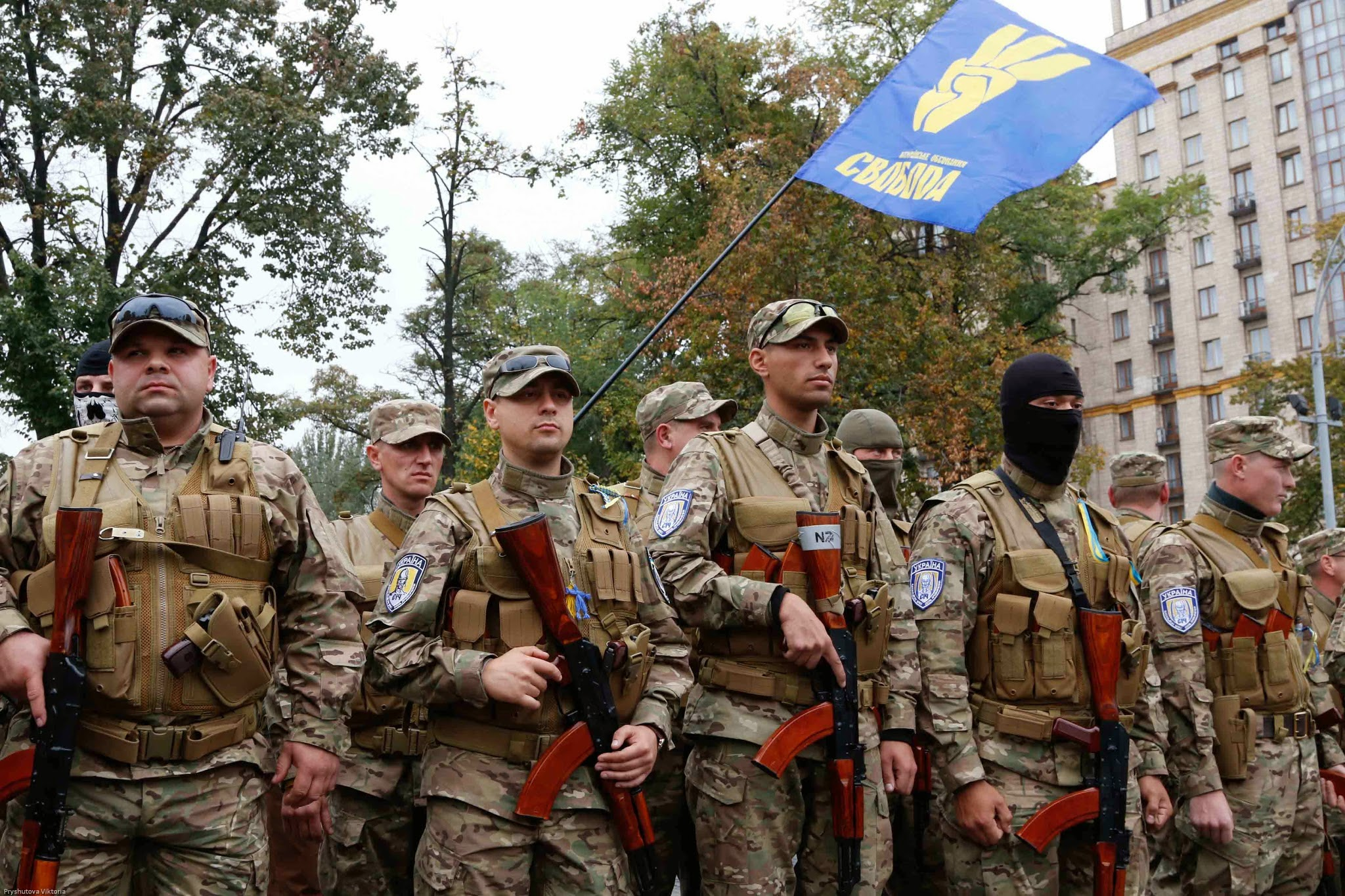
Volunteers of the Sich Battalion, behind them is the flag of Svoboda.

On 26 August 2014, about 100 battalion soldiers took the Oath of Allegiance to the people of Ukraine, after which about 50 soldiers went to the ATO zone. Solemn farewells took place on Instytutska Street in Kyiv, where the Heavenly Hundred had died.

Together with the soldiers, seven people's deputies of the 7th convocation from 2012 to 2014 from the Svoboda party went to the East: Yuriy Syrotiuk, Oleksiy Kaida, Oleh Osukhovskyi, Oleh Gelevey, Oleksandr Myrnyi, Andriy Tyagnybok, and Oleksiy Furman. They took turns accompanying the fighters during their stay in the anti-terrorist operation zone.

On 27 September, the battalion's fighters returned from the anti-terrorist operation to their place of deployment. On 30 September, after a solemn ceremony, a new special unit of the battalion left for eastern Ukraine.

According to the press service of the battalion, part of the unit is located in the Donetsk region near Kurakhovo, where it performs tasks to protect the dam of the Kurakhiv TPP. The battalion's base camp is located in Sloviansk, where special forces protect peace in the city and maintain law and order.

=== Operations as police unit ===
By 2015, the Ministry of Internal Affairs banned people registered in political parties from enlisting in their units. The Sich Battalion cut their official ties with Svoboda and on 21 December 2015. The Sich Battalion was reformed into the 4th Company "Sich" of the Kyiv Regiment, as part of the Kyiv city special police, with Maxim Morozov as its commander.

Arsen Avakov, the head of the Ministry of Internal Affairs, said that a member of the Sich Battalion was arrested after a member of the National Guard of Ukraine was killed during rioting in Kyiv on 31 August 2015.

== See also ==
- S14 (Ukrainian group)
- Azov Battalion
- Aidar Battalion
