= Jaguar (special unit) =

Special police unit of Ukraine

8th Special Purpose Regiment "Jaguar"
- Окремий полк спеціального призначення «Ягуар»
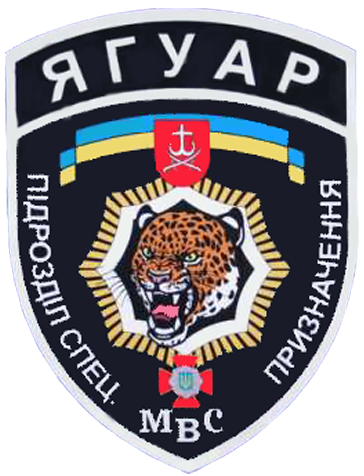
- Active: 1994–2014
- Disbanded: 2014
- Allegiance: Ukraine
- Branch: Internal Troops of Ukraine
- Role: Prison security Border guard
- Garrison/HQ: Kalynivka
- Engagements: Euromaidan; Russo-Ukrainian War; War in Donbas
- Commander: Colonel Ivan Myropolskyi

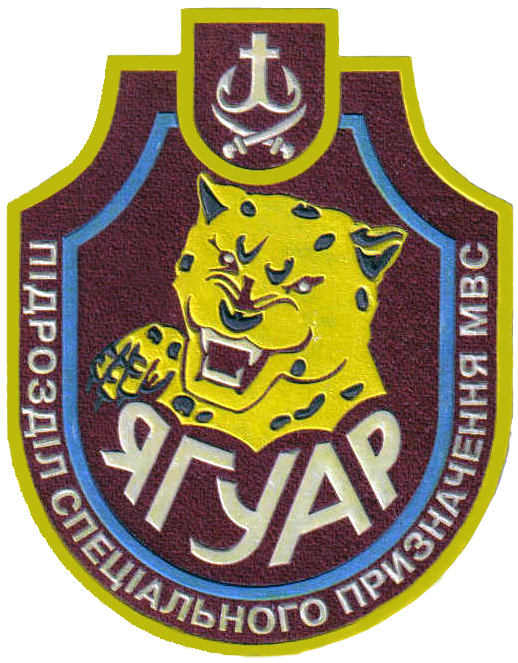
Sleeve patch of the special purpose regiment "Jaguar"

The 8th Special Purpose Regiment "Jaguar" (military unit 3028) is a formation of the Internal Troops of Ukraine, which existed from 1994 to 2014 and was stationed in the city of Kalynivka. Since 2014, the regiment belonged to the Western Territorial Command of the National Guard of Ukraine. The commander of the special unit is Colonel Ivan Myropolskyi.

Since 2015, the regiment has been reformed as the 8th operational regiment of the NSU which became the 14th Chervona Kalyna Brigade of the Offensive Guard.

== History ==
A special purpose regiment of the Internal Troops of the Ministry of Internal Affairs of Ukraine was founded in accordance with the order of the Ministry of Internal Affairs of Ukraine No. 25 dated 1 June 1994 on the basis of the training center of the military unit 3008 of the Internal Affairs Forces of the Ministry of Internal Affairs in the village of Tyutky, Vinnytsia Raion, Vinnytsia Region. Since 14 October 1995, the unit has been stationed in the city of Kalynivka, Vinnytsia Oblast.

The unit participated in the ATO, particularly the defense of the Kramatorsk Airport and the battles for Semenivka near Slovyansk, where it suffered its first losses.

During Euro-2012 in Ukraine, the Jaguars ensured the protection of public order and the safety of citizens in Lviv.

=== Euromaidan ===
In 2014, the Vinnytsia Jaguars were involved in the protection of law and order during the Maidan in Kyiv. Unarmed policemen were on duty on Hrushevsky Street in Kyiv. During the confrontation, 73 Jaguar servicemen were wounded.

Jaguar activity gained particular resonance after the statement of People's Deputy of Ukraine Oleh Liashko about the involvement of the unit's employees, whom he gave by name, in bullying Euromaidan self-defense Cossack Mykhailo Havryliuk during the 2014 Hrushevskoho Street riots in Kyiv in January 2014. Previously, the lieutenant general of the police, the former head of the Main Department of the Ministry of Internal Affairs of Ukraine in Kyiv, People's Deputy of Ukraine Vitaly Yarema stated that Havrylyuk was abused by the employees of the special purpose unit "Omega". The group of public relations and mass media of the Western Territorial Command of the Armed Forces of the Ministry of Internal Affairs of Ukraine denied information about the named names.

=== Release of the Kharkiv Regional State Administration ===
On the morning of 8 April 2014, Jaguar servicemen liberated the building of the Kharkiv regional administration, in which pro-Russian separatists barricaded themselves. 70 violators were detained without a single shot or casualties.

=== Participation in the ATO ===
In April 2011, Jaguar soldiers were on operational and preventive duty on the streets of Donetsk.

According to Major Serhii Didyk, in 2005–2011, the Jaguars made almost thirty trips to different parts of the country. Every summer the Jaguars go to Odesa, where they protect the peace of vacationers during the holiday season. However, there is enough urgent work for special forces in other regions as well. Thus, in 2005, in addition to the already mentioned Black Sea coast, Jaguar servicemen took part in operational and preventive exercises in Donetsk Oblast, Cherkasy Oblast, and in Kyiv. In 2006, special forces had to protect public order in Kharkiv, Lviv, and on the territory of Chernivtsi Oblast. In 2007, in addition to Odesa, the Jaguars visited Chernivtsi, Kyiv and Zhytomyr. In 2008, the Special Forces of the Armed Forces met in Donetsk Oblast, Zakarpattia, Odesa Oblast, in 2009 - again in Donetsk and South Palmyra. Jaguar servicemen visited Kyiv twice, and during June–August they again guarded public order in the resorts of Odesa Oblast.

With the reestablishment of the National Guard of Ukraine, the special unit was reorganized into the 8th Regiment of Operational Assignment of the NSU.

== Roles ==
Intended for establishing law and order during group hooliganism, stopping mass riots, and suppressing prison riots.

In the event of an aggravation of the situation at the state border, it can be used for coordinated actions with units of the State Border Guard Service of Ukraine.

In the conditions of a military conflict, the unit functions as an assault squad. The unit is suitable for both defensive and offensive operations.

In domestic duties, the unit is engaged in official combat training, and carries out patrol duty to protect public order.

== Equipment ==
The unit possesses small arms in its arsenal.

== Symbolism ==
A jaguar was taken as the basis of heraldic symbols and the name of this formation of power structures.
