= Viacheslav Kutovyi =

Ukrainian politician

- Вячеслав Кутовий
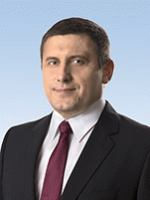

People's Deputy of Ukraine
- In office 12 December 2012 – 27 November 2014
- Preceded by: Constituency re-established
- Succeeded by: Mykhailo Havryliuk
- Constituency: Kyiv Oblast, No. 95

Personal details
- Born: 24 April 1971 (age 55) Boiarka, Ukrainian SSR, Soviet Union
- Party: Batkivshchyna (until 2013)
- Education: Ivano-Frankivsk National Technical University of Oil and Gas; Taras Shevchenko National University of Kyiv
- Website: kutovyi.org.ua

Viacheslav Hryhorovych Kutovyi (Ukrainian: Вячесла́в Григо́рович Кутови́й; born 24 April 1971) is a Ukrainian politician who served as a People's Deputy of Ukraine from 2012 to 2014, representing Ukraine's 95th electoral district.

== Early life ==
Viacheslav Kutovi was born 24 April 1971, in Boiarka, in Ukraine's central Kyiv Oblast. His father, Hryhorii Mykhailovych, was a builder and his mother Nadiia Mykolaievna was an accountant.

Kutovyi served in the Ukrainian Ground Forces from 1992 to 1995.

Following his military service, Kutovyi studied at the Ivano-Frankivsk National Technical University of Oil and Gas and later at Taras Shevchenko National University of Kyiv, where he received a Ph.D. in 2005.

== Political activity ==
From 2010 to 2012, he served as a deputy of the Vyshneve City Council in the Kyiv-Sviatoshyn Raion, Kyiv Oblast.

From 12 December 2012 to 27 November 2014, he was a People's Deputy of Ukraine from the Batkivshchyna party, representing Ukraine's 95th electoral district. He received 26.90% of the vote. He was Chairman of the Subcommittee on Gas Industry Issues within the Committee of the Verkhovna Rada on Fuel and Energy Complex, Nuclear Policy, and Nuclear Safety.

In June 2013, Kutovyi left Batkivshchyna, a move described by the Razumkov Centre as Kutovyi being "poached" by the Yanukovych government to weaken the parliamentary opposition.

Additionally, in 2013 Kutovyi, along with 148 other people's deputies of Ukraine, signed an appeal by deputies from the Party of Regions and Communist Party of Ukraine to the Polish Sejm, asking to "recognize the Volhynia tragedy as genocide against the Polish population and condemn the criminal acts of Ukrainian nationalists." This action was criticized by the first president of Ukraine, Leonid Kravchuk, as national treason.

== Sources ==
- Viacheslav Hryhorovych Kutovyi dovidka.com.ua
- Official website of Viacheslav Kutovyi
