= Kyiv-1 Police Battalion =

Military unit

First Company of the Kyiv Regiment
- 1-ша рота полку «Київ»
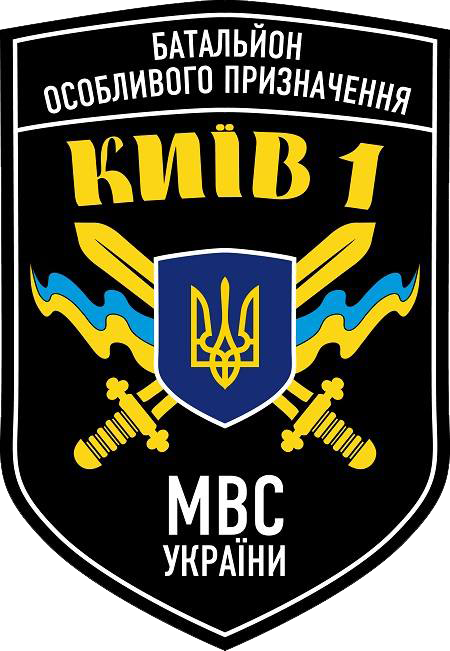
- Active: 2014 – present
- Country: Ukraine
- Branch: National Police of Ukraine (Special Police Forces)
- Size: 150 (June 2014)
- Part of: Kyiv Regiment
- Engagements: 2014 pro-Russian unrest in Ukraine; 2014 Odesa clashes; Russo-Ukrainian War; War in Donbas (2014–2022); Siege of Sloviansk

Commanders
- Current commander: Vitaliy Satarenko
- Notable commanders: Yevhen Deidei

The First Company of the Special-Purpose Kyiv Regiment (Ukrainian: 1-ша рота полку особливого призначення «Київ», romanized: 1-sha rota polku osoblyvoho pryznachennia «Kyiv»), formerly known as the Kyiv-1 Battalion (Ukrainian: Батальйон «Київ-1», romanized: Batalion «Kyiv-1») is a company of the National Police of Ukraine's Special Police Forces.

== History ==
The Kyiv-1 Police Battalion was founded in April 2014 as a part of the Special Police Forces (then known as the Special Tasks Patrol Police). By June 2014, 150 recruits, including women, had joined the battalion.

During the 2014 Odesa clashes, the Kyiv-1 Battalion was sent to the city in order to re-establish order, preventing an attempt to storm the Odesa Oblast State Administration building during its duties. Afterwards, it was moved to Kyiv, where it protected the city centre before being sent to the Anti-Terrorist Operation Zone in the Donbas on 1 July 2014.

In the Donbas, the Kyiv-1 Battalion participated in the recapture of Mykolaivka from the Donetsk People's Republic and announced a hunt for separatist leader Igor Girkin. On 8 July 2014, eight soldiers of the battalion who had partaken in the Siege of Sloviansk were awarded watches engraved with their names by Minister of Internal Affairs Arsen Avakov in a public ceremony in Sloviansk.

During the 7 August 2014 clashes between the Maidan Self-Defence and the Kyiv municipal authorities trying to remove barricades, the Kyiv-1 Battalion provided support to the authorities.

In November 2015, the battalion merged with the Kyiv-2, Zoloti Vorota, Sich, and Svyata Mariya battalions to make the Kyiv Regiment.

During the 2022 Russian invasion of Ukraine, the battalion fought in the Battle of Kyiv and the Battle of Avdiivka.
