= Kyiv-2 Company (Ukraine) =

- Ukrainian: Компанія Київ-2
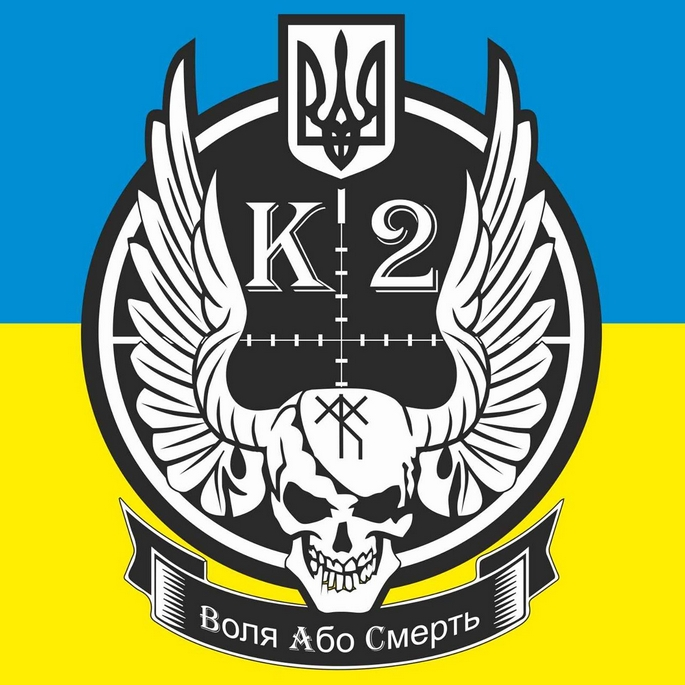
- Kyiv-2 Company Insignia
- Active: 2014–present
- Country: Ukraine
- Branch: Ministry of Internal Affairs
- Type: Special Tasks Patrol Police
- Size: 250-300
- Part of: Kyiv Regiment
- Garrison/HQ: Kyiv Oblast
- Motto: Will or Death!
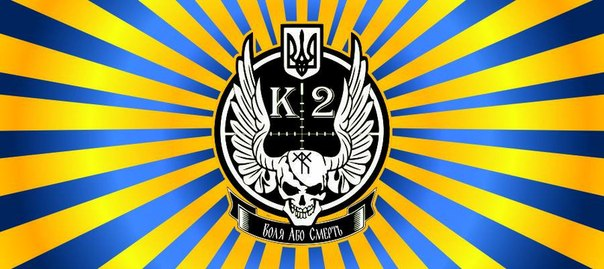
- Colors
- Engagements: Russo-Ukrainian War; War in Donbass; Siege of Sloviansk; Battle of Debaltseve; 2022 Russian invasion of Ukraine; Northern Ukraine campaign; Battle of Kyiv; Eastern Ukraine campaign

Commanders
- Current commander: Bohdan Wojciechovsky

The Second Company of the Special-Purpose Kyiv Regiment (Ukrainian: 2-ша рота полку особливого призначення «Київ», romanized: 2-sha rota polku osoblyvoho pryznachennia «Kyiv»), formerly known as the Kyiv-2 Battalion (Ukrainian: Батальйон «Київ-2», romanized: Batalion «Kyiv-2») is a battalion of the Kyiv Regiment of the National Police of Ukraine's Special Police Forces. It was established in 2014 and since then, has seen regular combat.

== History ==
The "Kyiv-2" battalion was formed from the members of Maidan Self-Defense with most personnel being the veterans of the Soviet Afghan war and activists of the S14 organization and Svobada party as well as volunteers from Kyiv Oblast and Eastern Ukraine.

We are a team. We were building cathedral Ukraine long before the war. And fraternal income and support, a surge of care have worked more than once before. Only relatives and volunteers help out the soldier. And volunteers are warmed by the society that we have been building for a long time.

It was initially deployed to fight in the Battle of Debaltseve. On 4 September 2014, the battalion retreated to Sloviansk.

The ring near Debaltseve almost closed, so we were forced to retreat from Debaltseve to Sloviansk.

Whilst operating in Sloviansk, the battalion destroyed four separatist sabotage and reconnaissance groups. Teg battalion continued to operate in Chornukhyne where on 18 August 2014, the battalion raided a house where separatists were staying. There were also civilians in the building, so during the operation sk the fighters of the "Kyiv-2" battalion did not use grenades, during the battle a soldier of the battalion (Serhii Anatoliyovych Podgornyi) was killed in action. On 10 October 2014, Hennadiy Moskal alleged that the battalion had left its positions in Chornukhyne and withdrew from the ATO zone without an order. The commander of the "Kyiv-2" battalion Bohdan Voytsekhovsky rejected the allegation:

We have everything according to plan. Yes, we left the village of Chornukhyne, where we stayed for exactly three weeks ... but we did not leave the ATO zone ... We went to our base, reformed, received additional heavy weapons, which the Ministry of Defense finally allowed us to allocate. .. We have been in the ATO zone for more than two months.

Anton Gerashchenko confirmed this withdrawal to be according to plan. It continued operations in Volnovakha* during which it provided security during the elections of People's Deputies to the Verkhovna Rada of Ukraine on 26 October 2014. Personnel of the battalion, together with the local police, freed the head of the district election commission of UHC No. 60, who had been taken hostage, and detained two kidnappers. Arsen Avakov said:

A few hours after the appointment of a new head of the district election commission No. 60 in the city of Volnovakha, Donetsk region, instead of the one who refused, the police received a report of her disappearance. As a result of operational measures carried out by the fighters of the special battalion of the Ministry of Internal Affairs "Kyiv-2", the location of the missing woman was established, she was released, and the kidnappers were detained.

On 16 November 2014, the "Kyiv-2" battalion conducted a joint operation with the Security Service of Ukraine uncovering a group of separatists near Volnovakha, of which three were captured.

== Armament ==
When the "Kyiv-2" battalion was formed, only light small arms were provided to its personnel. In September and October 2014, it received heavy weaponry such as large-caliber machine guns, automatic grenade launchers, disposable anti-tank hand grenade launchers, including predominately the DShK and Degtyaryov machine guns produced from 1950s-1970s.

== Awards and honours ==
On 24 October 2014, the soldiers of the "Kyiv-2" battalion were awarded with badges "For bravery in the service" and thanks, as well as branded firearms. 70 policemen from the "Kyiv-2" battalion were assigned special ranks. On 19 December 2014, two soldiers of the Battalion were awarded "Orders for Courage, 3rd degree".

== Command ==
External image
- Богдан Войцеховский у Сухолуччі

- Commander: Bohdan Voytsekhovsky
- Deputy Commander: Yevhenii Herod

== Sources ==
- Під Києвом відбулась презентація добровольчого батальйону «Київ 2» - Громадське Телебачення on YouTube
- Батальйон «Київ-2» готується до виїзду в зону АТО - 5 канал on YouTube
- Бійці батальйону «Київ-2» патрулюють Чорнухино - Радіо Свобода on YouTube
- Батальйон «Київ-2» в зоні АТО on YouTube
- Сторінка батальйону «Київ-2» в Facebook
- Бойцы батальона «Киев-2» нашли авто, которое украли у их товарища
