= Mykhailo Havryliuk =

Ukrainian activist and politician

- Михайло Гаврилюк
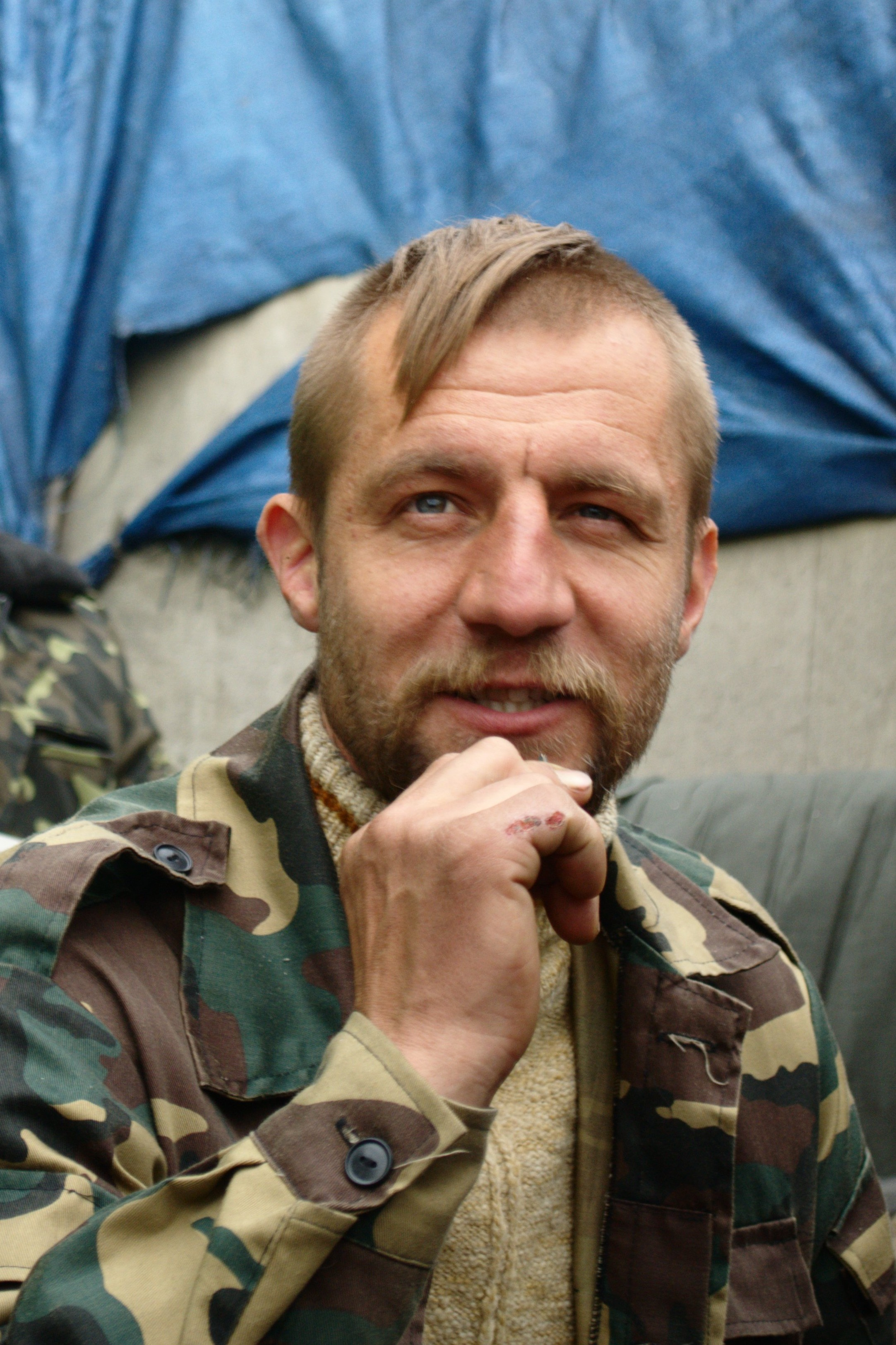
- Havryliuk in April 2014

People's Deputy of Ukraine
- In office 27 November 2014 – 29 August 2019
- Preceded by: Viacheslav Kutovyi
- Succeeded by: Oleksandr Horobets
- Constituency: Kyiv Oblast, No. 95

Personal details
- Born: 15 August 1979 (age 46) Yarivka, Ukrainian SSR, Soviet Union
- Party: People's Front

Military service
- Allegiance: Ukraine
- Branch/service: Territorial defence battalions Special Police Forces
- Unit: Zoloti Vorota Battalion
- Battles/wars: War in Donbas

Mykhailo Vitaliiovych Havryliuk (Ukrainian: Миха́йло Віта́лійович Гаврилю́к; born 15 August 1979) is a Ukrainian activist and politician who served as a People's Deputy of Ukraine from 2014 to 2019, representing Ukraine's 95th electoral district in Kyiv Oblast. He participated in the 2014 Euromaidan protests and was publicly tortured by Berkut officers, later serving in the war in Donbas.

== Biography ==
Mykhailo Vitaliyovych Havryliuk was born 15 August 1979, in the village of Yarivka, in Ukraine's western Chernivtsi Oblast. He has a son, Maxim. On 22 May 2016, he married a student of one of Kyiv's universities, Yaryna Khemii, a native of Kolomyia, whom he met on Kyiv's Maidan during the Revolution of Dignity, with whom he has a daughter.

== Euromaidan and torture ==
The events of the Euromaidan opened on 21 November 2013, with a protest in Maidan Nezalezhnosti (Independence Square) in Kyiv, sparked by the Ukrainian government's sudden decision to not sign the European Union–Ukraine Association Agreement. These were followed by further large protests, condemning Russophile Ukrainian President Viktor Yanukovych and calling for his resignation. On 30 November 2013, the protests were violently dispersed, with students, many of them women, severely beaten and injured. Havryliuk came to Euromaidan to condemn this violence, joining one of the many sotnias, or hundreds, the unarmed units responsible as an informal policing force for protecting protesters from police and providing security within the city.

On 22 January 2014, a march on Hrushevsky Street degenerated into a melee. Soldiers of the Berkut and other members of the state security services forced Havryliuk to strip naked to only his shoes and socks, despite the day's weather (about -10°C or 15°F, with wind speeds of about 5 m/sec or 15 mph). He was then paraded naked among these officers, who mocked him and took turns posing him for photos and videos on their mobile phones while subjecting Havryliuk's already heavily bruised body to further physical abuse. This game, insofar as the picture taking went, ended with Havryliuk, still undressed, loaded onto an unheated bus with other prisoners.

Police Captain Anton Gusev released a video of this incident on 23 January.

Havryliuk retained a remarkable composure throughout, which, as much as the abuse, lent this incident its viral quality. The Berkut had subjected other protestors similar treatment; on 20 January it had been reported that this security force had "undressed two men, doused them with cold water, and then forced them to run naked through barricades on the Maidan."

=== Reaction ===
The video of the cold, naked Havryliuk being publicly mocked brought a quick response, and was decried as "scandalous". Church Patriarch Filaret admired Mykhailo Havryliuk's courage. In early February 2014, Maidan participants set up a billboard in Rava-Ruska with a painted portrait of Havryliuk and the inscription: "A nation exists as long as there are PEOPLE ready to defend it. Glory to Ukraine! Glory to the heroes!" and a care effort was raised to support Havryliuk's needs and enable him to continue his participation in Euromaidan.

The videos of Havryliuk's dignified composure under torture were subsequently used in documentaries by film director Evgeny Afineevsky, including Pray for Ukraine (2015) and the 2016 Oscar and Emmy nominated Winter on Fire (2015),

The Yanukovych government's response was less strong. The Minister of Internal Affairs V. Zakharchenko called generally for "compliance with the law and morality", but made no call for dismissals. while the Commissioner for Human Rights Valeria Lutkovska gave an equally generalized rebuke to the Berkut as to why the incident was unacceptable. Ukrainian lawyer Mykola Siriy, in a legal analysis of the actions of the soldiers of the Special Forces of the Internal Troops, stated:

"In international criminal law, torture is recognized as acts aimed at inciting the victim or a third party to take certain active actions, as well as acts without a specific purpose for arbitrary reasons. According to the practice of application of the norms of international criminal law, the commission of torture by officials of law enforcement agencies in this form with the presence of these signs in relation to only one person falls under the definition of a crime not covered by the statute of limitations. Law enforcement officials have tortured Mykhailo Havryliuk, ie taken actions that are considered a crime against humanity under international criminal law"

=== Criminal inquiry ===
The Kyiv Prosecutor's Office opened a criminal case under Article 365 of the Criminal Code of Ukraine (Excess of power or official authority). The former head of the Kyiv police, Vitaliy Yarema, identified the security officers on the video as members of unit 3027 "Omega", stationed in Novy Petrivtsi (Mezhyhirya) On 2 February, Oleh Lyashko, in turn, stated that Havryliuk had been detained, undressed and tortured in the cold by soldiers of special unit No. 3028, individually identifying the principal bad actors as Serhiy Khortyuk, Maksym Kostyuk, Major Ihor Firak (who Lyashko identified as the man who had opened a wound on Havryliuk's forehead). Commands to these soldiers were given by Colonel Oleg Nikolaevich Plakhotnyuk. The video itself shows the helmet of one of the security officers with the number of unit 228]. Havryliuk himself seemed to feel that the on-the-ground participants in the incident required no further punishment. When the responsible warrant officer stood trial for his crimes, facing eight years in prison, Havryliuk said he was dropping all charges against the man:

"I do not have any claim to this man and I want him to get released, do his own business and raise his children. Why should his child become an orphan, why should his dad be taken away from him? I think that it will be a much better lesson than 8 years in prison. I don't want the father to be taken away from the kiddies, I withdraw my complaints against him. It's better to let him raise his children, so that such things are never repeated again."

== Military service ==
During the war in Donbas, Havryliuk was engaged in the delivery of humanitarian goods to Donetsk Oblast. He announced the creation of the Cossack Battalion of Volunteers of the National Guard. He acted as commander of one of the branches of Zoloti Vorota Battalion, part of the Special Police Forces. Havryliuk was a member of the territorial defense battalion.

== In the Verkhovna Rada ==
On 10 September 2014, at the congress of the People's Front party, together with the commanders of the volunteer battalions, Havryliuk was included in the Military Council, a special body that will develop proposals to increase Ukraine's defense capabilities as the nation prepared for its first parliamentary elections following Yanukovych's flight to Russia.

On 26 October 2014, Havryliuk was elected to the Verkhovna Rada (parliament of Ukraine) during the Ukrainian parliamentary election as a candidate of People's Front, receiving 19.43% of the votes (17.382 votes). He served as People's Deputy in Ukraine's 95th electoral district, representing Irpin and part of Kyiv-Sviatoshyn Raion. In 2015, Havrilyuk initiated a bill to save the historic Vorzelsky House of Composers' Creativity in Kyiv from decline. This bill was considered by committees, but for unknown reasons was not put to the vote. Interviewers found Havryliuk's aggressive demeanor on the house floor perplexing, it was not clear if he expected to be taken seriously when he insulted the press corps or fellow parliamentary members.

In the 2019 Ukrainian parliamentary election, this time as a self-nominated candidate, and again in the 95th electoral district, Havryliuk failed to regain his parliamentary seat. 512 people voted for him, thus he gained 0.56% of the (2019) votes of the district.
