= Oleksandr Horobets =

Ukrainian politician

- Олександр Горобець
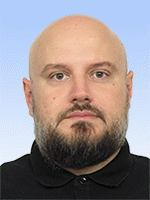
- Official portrait, 2019

People's Deputy of Ukraine
- Incumbent
- Assumed office 29 August 2019
- Preceded by: Mykhailo Havryliuk
- Constituency: Kyiv Oblast, No. 95

Personal details
- Born: 15 February 1978 (age 48) Bila Tserkva, Ukrainian SSR, Soviet Union (now Ukraine)
- Party: Servant of the People
- Other political affiliations: Independent
- Education: Kyiv National Economic University; National Academy for Public Administration; Interregional Academy of Personnel Management

Oleksandr Serhiiovych Horobets (Ukrainian: Олександр Сергійович Горобець; born 15 February 1978) is a Ukrainian politician currently serving as a People's Deputy of Ukraine representing Ukraine's 95th electoral district as a member of Servant of the People since 2019.

== Early life and career ==
Oleksandr Serhiyovych Horobets was born on 15 February 1978 in the city of Bila Tserkva, in Ukraine's central Kyiv Oblast. He is a graduate of the Kyiv National Economic University, specialising in finance, as well as the National Academy for Public Administration. He also is a master in economics and law, and holds a doctorate of philosophy from the Interregional Academy of Personnel Management.

Prior to being elected, Horobets worked at the information centre of the Ministry of Justice for five years, rising through the ranks from a computer operator to head of the centre's Kyiv Oblast branch. He also worked in the fields of land resources, architecture, and urban planning. He worked at several businesses, including as deputy general director of Sfera Zhilebybud, founder of Perukar, and deputy director of the state-owned Ukrspirt. He also worked as a legal advisor to the Makariv Raion government from 2016 to 2017.

Horobets was one of the developers of electronic services for the State Geocadastre of Ukraine regarding land ownership.

== Political career ==
Before becoming a People's Deputy of Ukraine, Horobets served as an assistant to two other People's Deputies: Yevhenii Suslov in the 5th Ukrainian Verkhovna Rada and Yurii But in the 6th Ukrainian Verkhovna Rada.

In the 2019 Ukrainian parliamentary election, Horobets was the candidate of Servant of the People for People's Deputy of Ukraine in Ukraine's 95th electoral district. At the time of the election, he was an independent. His main opponent was independent Volodymyr Karpliuk, a local businessman who also brought several candidates with similar names to Horobets onto the ballot in an effort to decrease his share of the vote. The election marked the largest share of the vote ever obtained by a singular clone candidate in Ukrainian history.

In the Verkhovna Rada (parliament of Ukraine), Horobets joined the Servant of the People faction. He is a member of the Verkhovna Rada Energy, Housing, and Communal Services Committee. In 2022, he voted for Draft Law 5655, a bill on Ukraine's reconstruction following the Russian invasion of Ukraine. The bill, as well as Horobets' support, was criticised by anti-corruption advocates for being in the interests of urban developers.
