= 14th Chervona Kalyna Brigade =

Ukrainian special police unit

Chervona Kalyna Brigade
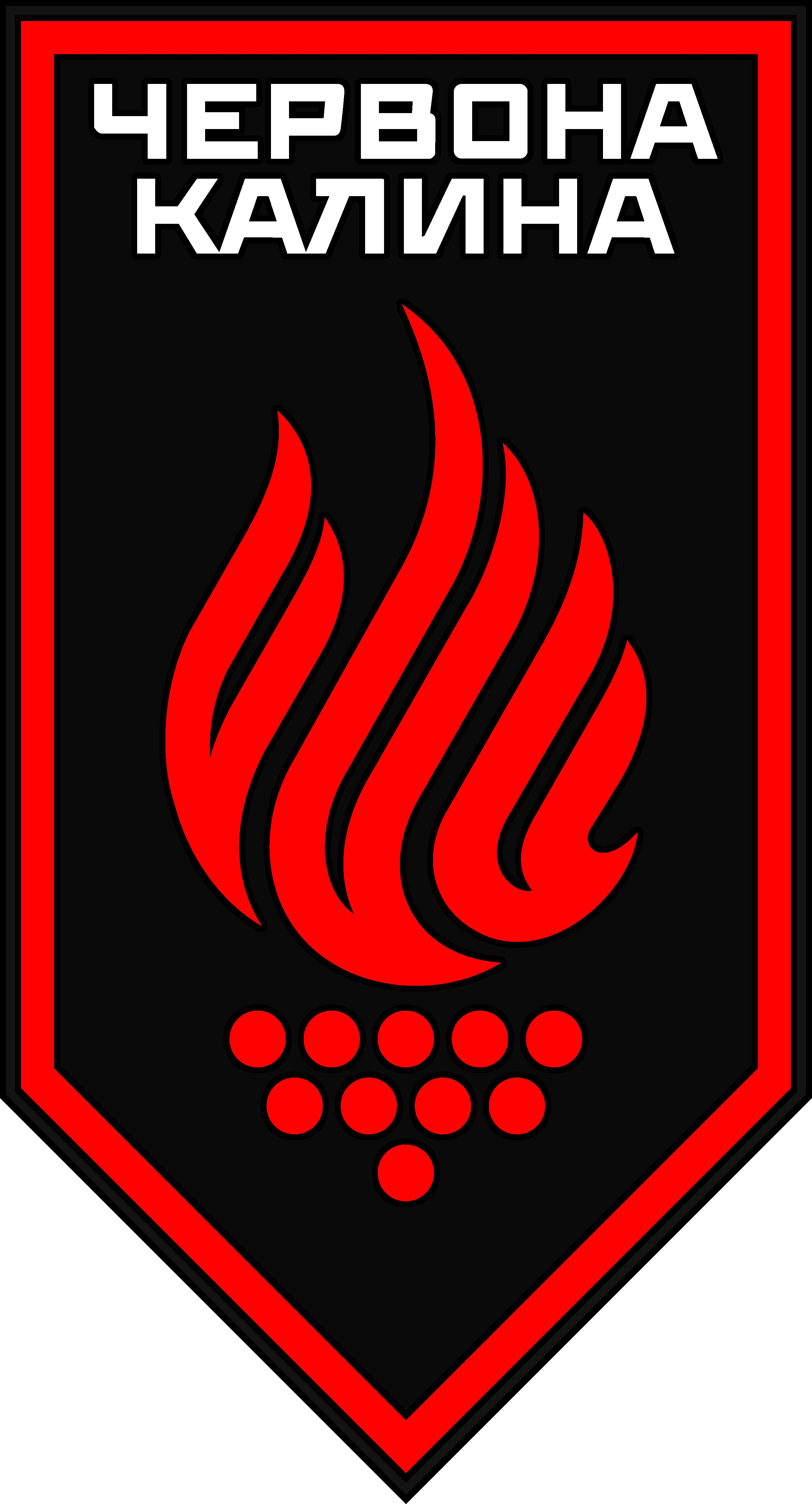
- Active: November 2, 2014 – Present
- Country: Ukraine
- Branch: National Guard of Ukraine
- Role: Offensive Guard
- Part of: 1st Azov Corps
- Garrison/HQ: Kalynivka, Vinnytsia Oblast
- Nickname: named after Ivan Bohun
- Patron: Ivan Bohun
- Motto: The Enemy Smolder Where the Viburnum Turns Red
- Engagements: Russo-Ukrainian war: War in Donbas; Full scale invasion; Zaporizhzhia front; 2023 Ukrainian counteroffensive; Pokrovsk offensive
- Decorations: For Courage and Bravery

Commanders
- Current commander: Colonel Oleksandr Okhrimenko

Insignia
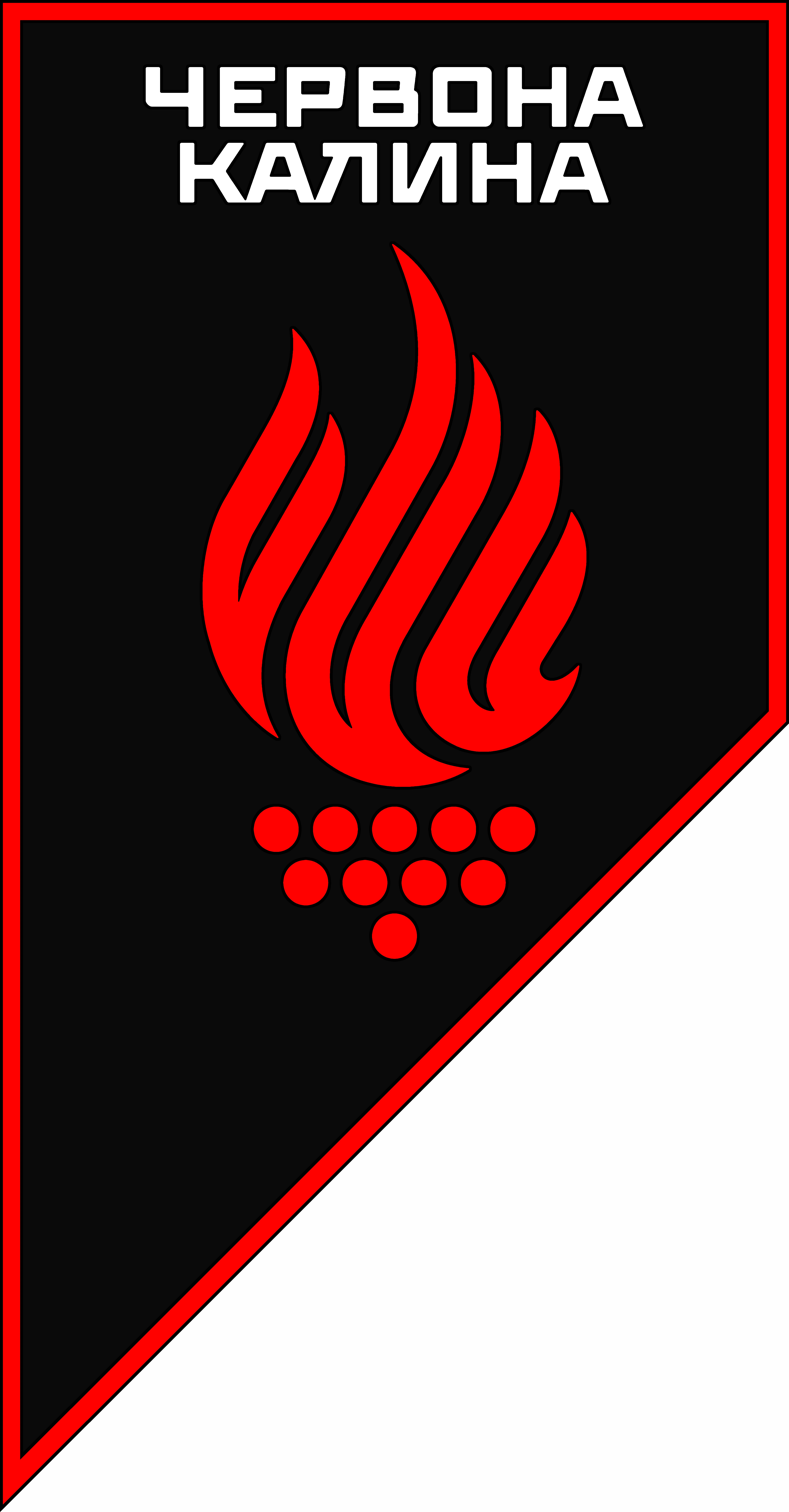
- Flag

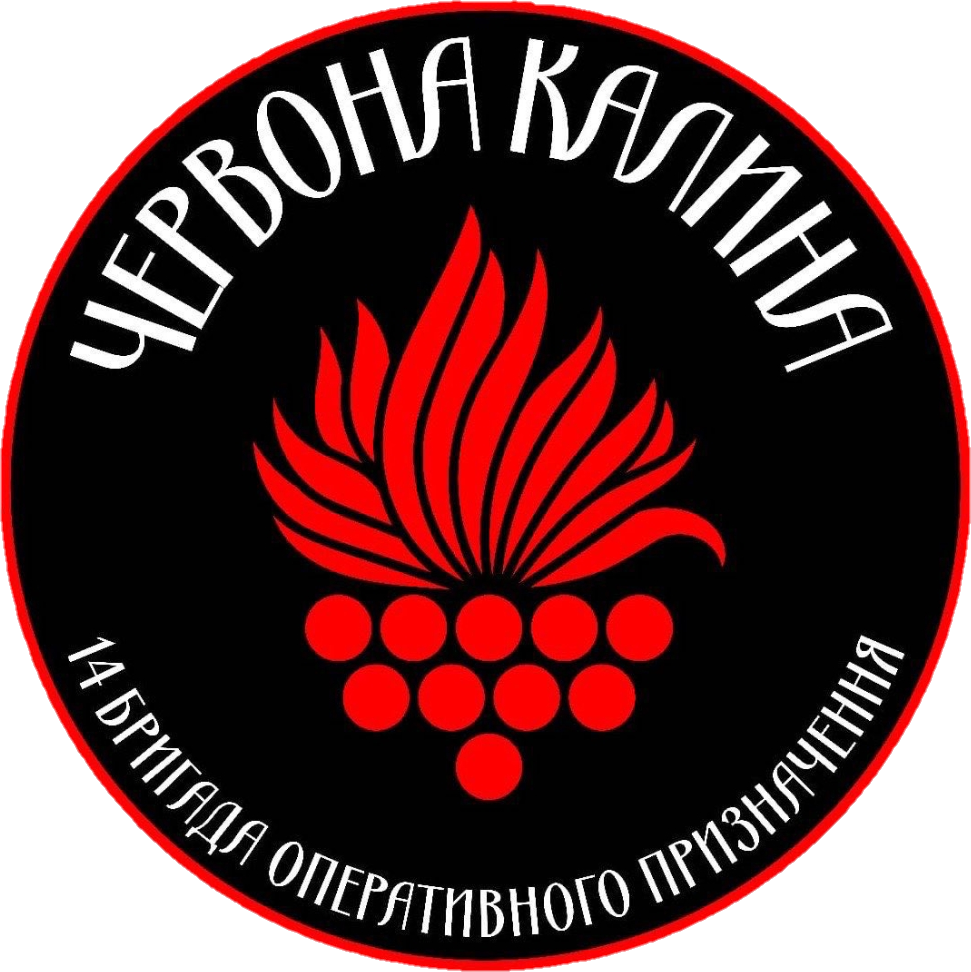
- Old Insignia (until 2026)

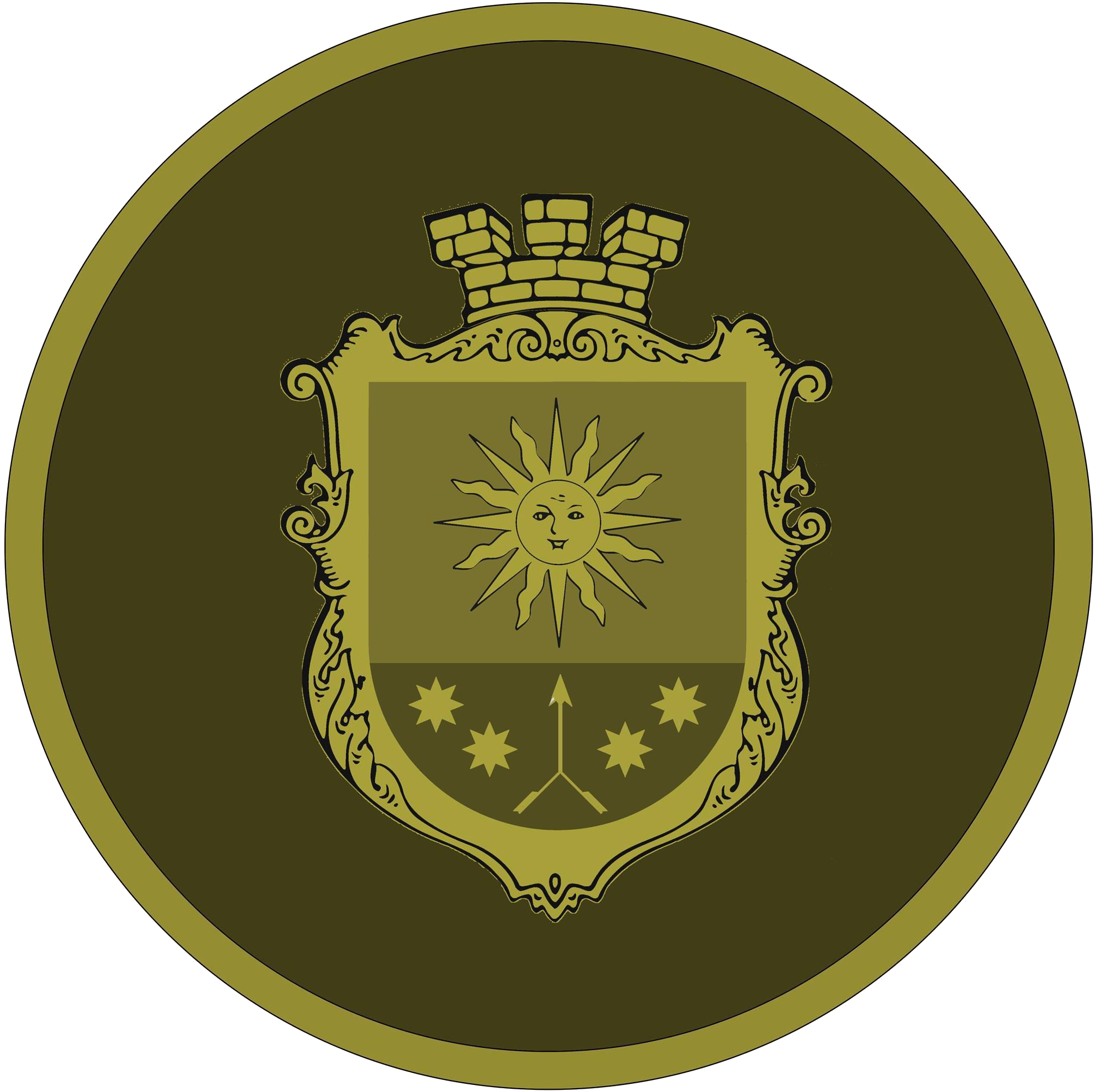
- Old Insignia

The 14th Chervona Kalyna Brigade named after Ivan Bohun (MUN 3028) (Ukrainian: Червона Калина, lit. 'Red Guelder Rose') is an assault brigade of the National Guard of Ukraine formed on the basis of the 8th operational regiment.

== History ==
In January 2024 the unit, in conjunction with The New Voice of Ukraine had a fundraiser for the creation and equipment of a sniper unit. As with most units of the offensive guard, one of the primary sources for personnel are volunteers from the Kyiv Oblast. The unit has primarily seen combat along the Zaporizhzhia front, performing defensive actions there alongside reconnaissance activities in July 2024. Namely, the unit has been repelling Russian assaults on Mala Tokmachka and Shcherbaky and primarily combat Russian drones to assist other unit along the front, as well as more traditional defensive efforts. The unit has also seen combat in the Pokrovsk offensive in August 2024.

== Structure ==
=== Before 2026 ===
UNit headquarters

- 1st Battalion of Operational Assignment
- 2nd Operational Battalion
- 3rd Operational Battalion “Tyhr”
- 4th Guardsmen Battalion
- 5th Guardsmen Battalion
- 6th Guardsmen Battalion
- Unmanned Aerial Vehicle Battalion
- Tank Company
- Artillery Group
- Anti-Aircraft Defense Battalion
- Reconnaissance Company
- Engineering Battalion
- Logistic Battalion
- Signal Company

=== After 2026 ===
Unit Headquarters

- Unit Headquarters
- 1st Operational Battalion "Yahuar"
- 2nd Operational Battalion "Feniks"
- 3rd Operational Battalion "Tyhr"
- 5th Operational Battalion "Pravytsia Sirka"
- Tank Company "Vovcha Zhraya" (T-72M1 e T-80BV)
- Unmanned Systems Battalion "Starfall"
- Artillery Battalion
- Support Battalion
- Battaglione logistico
- Anti-Aircraft Drone Interceptor Battery "Harpun"
- Compagnia ricognizione
- Engineering Battalion
- Signal Company
