= Yevhen Deidei =

Ukrainian politician and lieutenant colonel (1987–disappeared 2022)

- Євген Дейдей
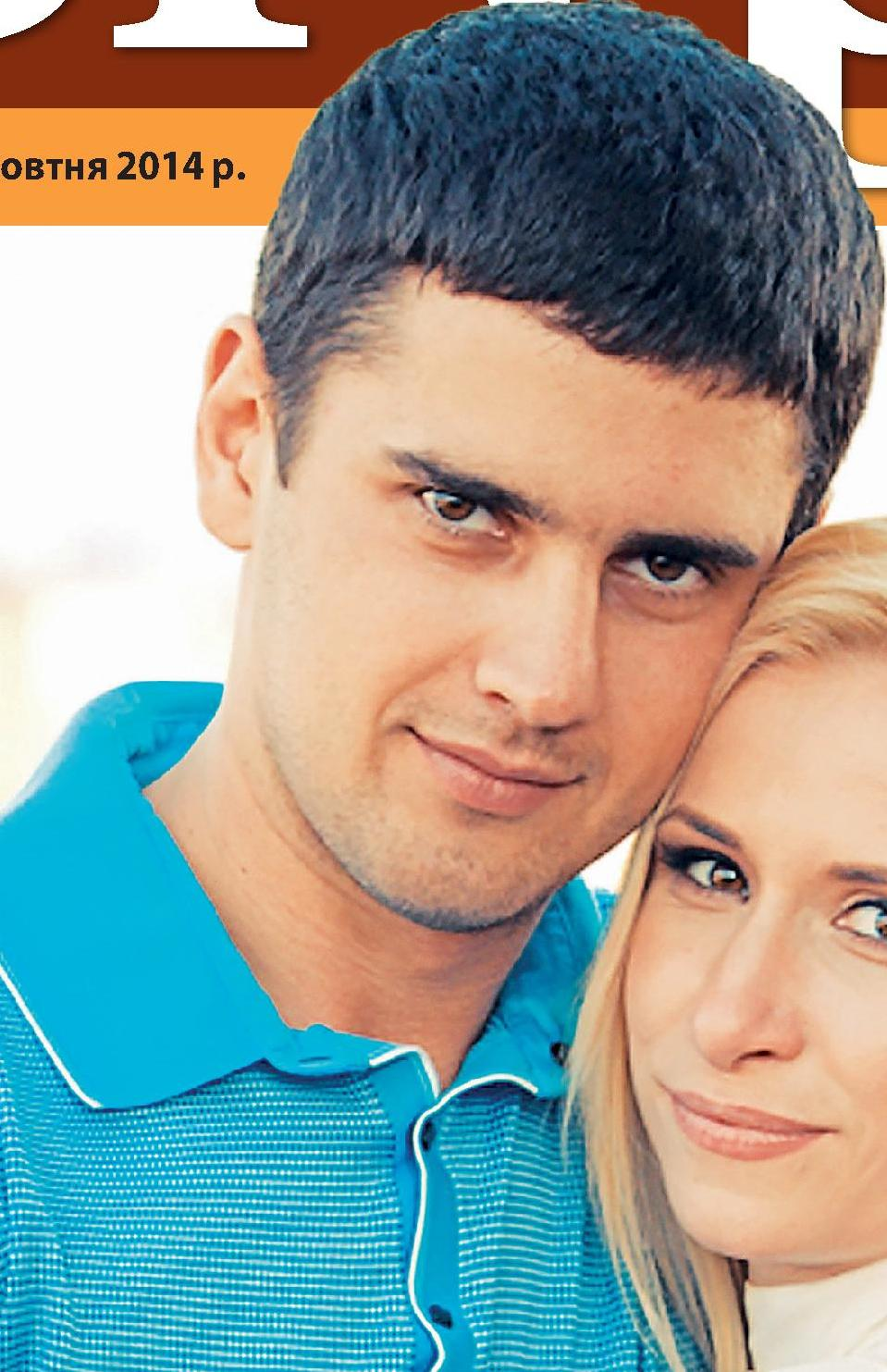
- Deidei in 2014

People's Deputy of Ukraine
- In office 27 November 2014 – 29 August 2019
- Constituency: People's Front, No. 32

Personal details
- Born: 12 July 1987 Reni, Ukrainian SSR, Soviet Union (now Ukraine)
- Party: People's Front
- Spouse(s): Inga Deidei (m. 2008; div. 2018) Daryna Lyedovskykh (m. 2018)
- Children: 1
- Education: National University Odesa Law Academy

Military service
- Allegiance: Ukraine
- Branch/service: National Police of Ukraine
- Years of service: 2014–2022
- Rank: Lieutenant colonel
- Commands: Kyiv-1 Police Battalion
- Battles/wars: Russo-Ukrainian War; War in Donbas

Yevhen Serhiyovych Deidei (Ukrainian: Євген Сергійович Дейдей; 12 July 1987) is a Ukrainian politician and lieutenant colonel who served as a People's Deputy of Ukraine from 2014 to 2019. Previously, he served as coordinator of the Kyiv-1 Police Battalion of the Special Tasks Patrol Police under the Ministry of Internal Affairs.

In 2012, he was sentenced to five years in prison for robbery but was later released from the punishment.

Deidei's current whereabouts are unknown. Initial reports indicated that he was killed during the 2022 Russian invasion of Ukraine, but other sources have subsequently claimed that he clandestinely left the country via smuggling routes.

== Early life and career ==
Deidei was born on 12 July 1987 in the small town of Reni, Odesa Oblast, which lies on the left bank of the Danube. His father, a deputy of the town council of Reni, Serhiy Yakovych Deidei, in 2011 he was convicted of fraud by the decision of Izmailsky District Court of Odesa Oblast. His mother was Olha Mykolayivna Deidei (née Volkova), he has a brother Serhiy.

In 2004, at the age of 17, he participated in protests during the Orange Revolution in Ukraine.

Deidei was convicted of robbery in 2012. The verdict was pronounced by the Suvorov district court of Odesa on 23 March 2012. Deidei received five years for robbery without confiscation of property. His accomplice Oleksiy Lyakhovolsky (later he became his assistant in Verkhovna Rada) received the same term of imprisonment - 5 years without confiscation of property. According to the court decision, Deidei acquired a hunting shotgun "TOZ" without any permit, later he sawed off the shoulder stock and barrel of the shotgun, which he kept with him without any legal rights. On 2 February 2011, Deidei and Lyakhovolsky made the first robbery attack on A. Trandasir and S. Trandasir on the 1st Student Lane in Odesa. They beat citizens and took their mobile phone and money. In the evening of the same day, Deidei and Lyakhovolsky attacked two men, A. Khmuryy and I. Sakal, at the corner of Krasnoslobodskaya Street and Yasha Gordienko Street. On the night of 3 February, near the house No. 3 along Ostrovsky Street, the criminals committed the third attack - on S. Syvoplyasov, D. Shevchuk and V. Rudkovska. Accomplices began to beat the men, when they were noticed by militsiya officers. Lyakhovolsky was arrested while trying to escape from the crime scene. On 11 February, after the opening of the criminal case, Deidei was also arrested.

Deidei and Lyakhovolsky fully admitted their guilt in the above explained crimes. On 23 March 2012, the Suvorov District Court of Odesa sentenced Deidei and Lyakhovolsky for robbery to five years in prison without confiscating of property (with a delay of three years). According to the decision of the Liubashivka District Court of the Odesa Oblast of 6 April 2015, Lyakhovolsky was released from the punishment. From the end of 2013, Deidei began to hide from the authorities, but was not wanted. After the beginning of the protests in Ukraine, Deidei became the Sotnik of the 7th Sotnia of “Self-Defense of the Maidan”.

=== War in Donbas ===
In 2014, Deidei became the coordinator of the battalion of the Special Tasks Patrol Police "Kyiv-1" of the Main Directorate of the Ministry of Internal Affairs of Ukraine in Kyiv. In November 2014, he became a people's deputy of the 8th convocation of the Verkhovna Rada on the list of the "People's Front" party.

In the same year, Deidei became the coordinator of the battalion of the Special Tasks Patrol Police "Kyiv-1" of the Main Directorate of the Ministry of Internal Affairs of Ukraine in Kyiv. On 10 September 2014, along with other commanders of volunteer battalions he was included in the Council of war of Ukraine during the congress of the party "People's Front".

On 24 February 2015, the car in which Deidei was travelling was shot from an RPG-7 rocket-propelled grenade launcher in the area of Marinka, Donetsk Oblast. Deidei managed to escape from the scene of the shelling, along with two soldiers of the "Kyiv-1" battalion, and got to the Kurakhove district department.

On 14 July 2017, Deidei received a shrapnel wound in a foot with an 82-mm shell in Avdiivka. This was reported by his comrade-in-arms in the "Kyiv-1" battalion. The Prosecutor's Office of Ukraine opened criminal proceedings. According to Ukrainian journalists, at the time when Deidei was in Avdiivka, no heavy shelling was recorded.

=== Political life ===
During Euromaidan, Deidei met a number of politicians who occupied or subsequently occupied high posts in the Ukrainian authorities - Arseniy Yatsenyuk, Arsen Avakov, and Oleksandr Turchynov. Deidei spoke about his decision to become a parliamentarian as follows: "I decided to go to the Verkhovna Rada because I saw people there [in Maidan Nezalezhnosti] who were different from those politicians who were there before us. [Previous politicians] did nothing, but robbery and theft. And I saw a perspective in these people, so I decided to follow them."

On 6 February 2015, a number of media published photos of correspondence between the deputy of the "People's Front" Oleksandr Kodola and Deidei. The latter promised $1,500 for Kodola for "asking a question" to the Prosecutor General of Ukraine, Vitaly Yarema, during his speech at the Verkhovna Rada. Kodola asked Yarema about the former First deputy prosecutor of the Pecherskyi District of Kyiv and, at that time, the Prosecutor of the Prymorsky City District of Odesa, Oleksandr Kuzmenko, who opposed the Euromaidan activists.

According to police sources, in 2015, Deidei together with his wife Inga flew four times on a private charter plane AHO633J of Denys Dzenzersky, whose assistant Ihor Linchevsky loaned Inga Deidei ₴3.5 million. Together with them, deputies Tetyana Donets and Andriy Pavelko flew to Berlin and returned to Kyiv from Paris, Cannes, and Budapest. During those flights, Deidei and Dzenzersky used diplomatic passports, which is strictly prohibited, since the purpose of their trip was leisure.

In March 2016, the head of the largest Ukrainian gas producer UkrGasVydobuvannya Oleh Prokhorenko appealed to the National Anti-Corruption Bureau, the Prosecutor General's Office, and the National Police to investigate the activities of deputies Maxym Polyakov and Deidei, who, according to Prokhorenko, was putting pressure on the company. Deidei protested against the appointment of Andrey Tokar to the post of Director of logistics of UkrGasVydobuvannya due to the fact that he previously worked at the Saratov Oil Refinery in Russia: "How can such a strategic object as UkrGasVydobuvannya be under the leadership of Putin's lapdogs?! It can't be allowed to happen," - Deidei wrote on his Facebook page on 3 March 2016. Deidei also participated in a protest action close to the UkrGasVydobuvannya's Office, and he gave to the company management a letter demanding to dismiss Tokar. UkrGasVydobuvannya's COO Oleksandr Romanyuk noted that such a position of the deputy frightens away foreign workers who speak Russian or English and have experience that Ukrainian citizens don't have.

In July 2016, the Governor of Odesa Oblast and the third President of Georgia, Mikheil Saakashvili, accused Deidei of blocking the attraction of Latvian investments in the port of Reni on behalf of Arsen Avakov. Saakashvili also expressed outrage at Deidei's criminal past: "A Latvian investor could invest €6 million in the Reni port, several hundred Renians could get a job. This is a depressive port. But deputy Deidei, who was convicted four times, calls me and on behalf of the Ministry of Internal Affairs, says that the Latvians should not be allowed. What does the MIA have to do with the port of Reni? And why a four times convicted person is sitting in the parliament and allowing himself to call and discussing such topics with me?"

In May 2017, the Prosecutor General of Ukraine, Yuriy Lutsenko, sent to the Verkhovna Rada a request for the removal of parliamentary immunity from Deidei. He was suspected of violating Article 368-2 of the Criminal Code of Ukraine ("illegal enrichment"). On 3 July, Lutsenko, during a meeting of the Rada's Regulatory Committee, showed recordings of telephone conversations about Inga Deidei's loan of ₴3.5 million from businessman Ihor Linchevsky. These records do not confirm the origin of the money through the loan. The materials of the Prosecutor's Office, sent in July 2017 to the Verkhovna Rada, stated the following:

1. According to the State Fiscal Service of Ukraine, from 1 June 2009 to 31 December 2016 Deidei received a total income of ₴241,883.3.
2. His ex-wife Inga Deidei from 14 September 2007 to 31 December 2016 received a total income of ₴1,198,822.50.
3. Total income of the Deidei family was ₴1,440,705.84.
4. In the declaration of Yevhen Deidei, it was stated that Inga had financial obligations to Ihor Linchevsky in the amount of ₴3.5 million.
5. During the pre-trial investigation, it was established that the loan agreement between Inga Deidei and Ihor Linchevsky was not executed, and the money was not transferred.
6. With a total income of ₴1,440,705.84, Deidei officially indicated assets of ₴6,133,690.95 - an apartment in Kyiv worth ₴2,893,993.06, two Audi Q7 cars (worth ₴1,574,818.67 and ₴1,664,879.22).

On 1 November 2018, Deidei was included in the Russian sanctions list in connection with Ukraine's unfriendly actions towards citizens and legal entities of the Russian Federation.

== Awards ==
- Order For Courage, 3rd class (2 August 2014). On 19 September 2018, a message appeared in the official government newspaper Uryadovy Kuryer, in which the Order For Courage (together with the order book) received by Deidei was declared lost.
- Honorary weapon – Glock-17 pistol (11 March 2015).
- 25 Years of Independence of Ukraine Medal (19 August 2016).

== Earnings ==
In 2013, Deidei did not declare any income. He owned a 15-year-old Toyota Corolla, and his wife Inga had a five-year-old Subaru Tribeca. In 2014, Inga Deidei, who earned ₴14,500 (USD 539) in a year, acquired a 2013 Chevrolet Camaro. On 18 and 19 October 2012, Inga purchased two apartments in Odessa, with areas of 43.2 square metres (465 sq ft) and 76 square metres (820 sq ft). The Camaro was sold next year for ₴700,000, and two Audi Q7 were bought for a total of ₴3.5 million. According to the declaration, the money came from a loan given to Inga.

In 2015, Deidei declared expenses in the amount of ₴2.737 billion for the construction of an apartment – without specifying the source of this money. In this regard, National Anti-Corruption Bureau opened criminal proceedings under article No. 368-2 of the Criminal Code of Ukraine ("Illegal enrichment"). At the end of 2015, Deidei declared US$30,000 in cash, and his former spouse – US$41,000 and ₴350,000. At the same time, the deputy's salary for 2015 was ₴70,600, he also received ₴80,500 as compensation for the exercise of powers, as well as ₴180,000 as compensation for rental housing, while Inga Deidei earned ₴39,000. Thus, Deidei paid ₴15,000 per month for renting an apartment of 137 square metres (1,470 sq ft).

According to an investigation of independent journalist Volodymyr Boyko, Deidei owned a luxury car park, consisting of Infiniti FX35 (2009), Chevrolet Camaro (2012), Audi A7 (2011), Toyota Land Cruiser 200 (2013), Porsche Cayenne (2011), as well as the two above-mentioned Audi Q7 (2015).

== Alleged death ==
On March 10, 2022, Deidei's wife announced his death, though she did not specify the circumstances. She later clarified that she had been informed of her husband's death, but did not specify by whom. Several sources from the Ukrainian border service and police have claimed that Deidei is in fact alive and illegally left the country into Romania via smuggling routes, and that a man who assisted him has been detained.
