= Oleksandr Okhrimenko =

Ukrainian serviceman

- Олександр Охріменко

Personal details
- Born: Oleksandr Viktorovych Okhrimenko

Military service
- Allegiance: Ukraine
- Branch/service: National Guard of Ukraine
- Rank: Colonel
- Battles/wars: Russo-Ukrainian War
- Awards: Order of Bohdan Khmelnytsky

Oleksandr Viktorovych Okhrimenko (Ukrainian: Олександр Вікторович Охріменко) is a Ukrainian serviceman, colonel of the 14th Operational Brigade of the National Guard of Ukraine, a participant in the Russian-Ukrainian war.

== Biography ==
In 2019, he was appointed First Deputy Commander and Chief of Staff of the 8th Operational Regiment of the National Guard of Ukraine.

In April 2023, he was appointed to the coordination group of the Anti-Terrorist Center under the Security Service of Ukraine's Directorate in Vinnytsia Oblast, in his capacity as commander of military unit 3028 of the National Guard of Ukraine.

Currently, he is the commander of the 14th Operational Brigade.

== Awards ==
- Order of Bohdan Khmelnytsky, 2nd class (27 December 2022)
- Order of Bohdan Khmelnytsky, 3rd degree (7 September 2022)
- Diploma of Koziatyn City Council (25 October 2019)
