= Crimea Operation (1918) =

1918 German-Ukrainian-Crimean offensive of World War I and the Ukrainian–Soviet War

- Part of the Eastern Front of World War I, the Southern Front of the Russian Civil War and the Ukrainian–Soviet War
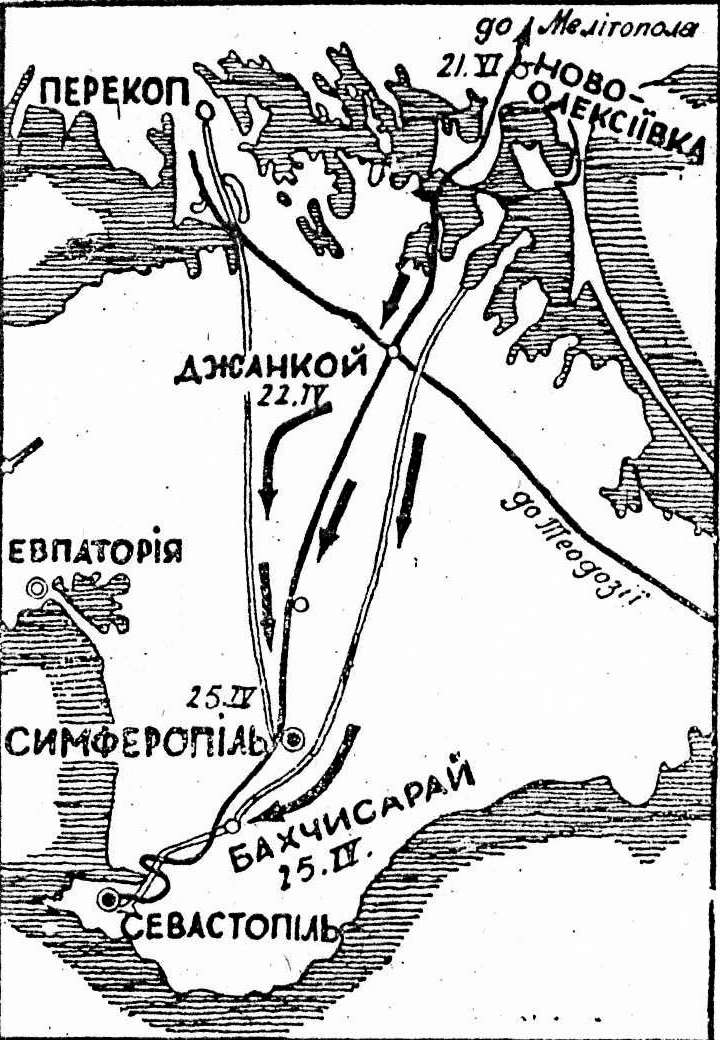
- German and Ukrainian advances from Novooleksiivka to Sevastopol from 21 April to 25 April 1918
Date	13–25 April 1918
Location	Crimea
Result	German–Ukrainian–Crimean victory; Dissolution of the Taurida Soviet Socialist Republic

Belligerents
(German Empire) Germany; Ukraine; Crimea	Taurida Soviet Socialist Republic

Commanders and leaders
(German Empire) Robert Kosch; (Ukrainian People's Republic) Mikhail Sablin; (Ukrainian People's Republic) Petro Bolbochan	Anton Slutsky (executed); Jan Tarwacki (executed)

Strength
Unknown	4,500

The Crimea Operation was a combined military offensive by Imperial German and Ukrainian forces in April 1918 against the Taurida Soviet Socialist Republic.

== Background ==
Following the Russian Revolution in December 1917, the Crimean People's Republic was declared which encompassed the entire territory of Crimea. However, this proclamation was challenged by Bolshevik forces and by January 1918, Crimea was overrun and the Taurida Soviet Socialist Republic was declared. Upon seizing Crimea, Bolshevik forces enacted a campaign of terror upon the Crimean Tatar population, killing Muslim clerics and wealthy landowners with the express goal of eliminating the Tatarian "bourgeois nationalists". In addition to the internal campaign of terror, Bolshevik forces attacked Ukrainian and German forces in the neighboring Ukrainian People's Republic.

== Operation ==
The Taurida Soviet Socialist Republic was quickly overrun by German and Ukrainian forces under command of Petro Bolbochan during the Crimean Offensive. The relatively quick pace of the operation was due to desertion and widespread demoralization amongst the forces of Taurida, in addition to simultaneous peasant revolts across Crimea. By the end of April 1918, the majority of the members of the Central Executive Committee and the Council of People's Commissars, including council leader Anton Slutsky and local Bolshevik chief Jan Tarwacki, were arrested and shot in Alushta by insurgent Crimean Tatars, partially in reaction to the prior killing of Tatar independence leader Noman Çelebicihan by the Bolsheviks earlier in February. On 30 April, the Taurida SSR was abolished and former Chief of Staff Mikhail Sablin raised the colours of the Ukrainian People's Republic on 29 April 1918.

== Aftermath ==
Despite the offensive violating the terms of the Treaty of Brest-Litovsk, German forces immediately set up a military administration in Crimea against the wishes of the local Tatar population. General Erich Ludendorff began plans to set Crimea up as a German colony and used the territory as a stepping stone for German offensives in the Caucasus region.

== See also ==
- Operation Faustschlag
- Navy of the Ukrainian People's Republic
