= Krymske =

Krymske (Ukrainian: Кримське) may refer to the following places in Ukraine:

- Krymske, Crimea, village in Saky Raion
- Krymske, Donetsk Oblast, settlement in Bakhmut Raion
- Krymske, Luhansk Oblast, village in Shchastia Raion
