= Danylo Halytsky Lviv National Medical University =

Public medical university in Lviv, Ukraine

Coordinates: 49.836°N 24.049°E

King Danylo Lviv National Medical University
- Львівський національний медичний університет імені Короля Данила
- University emblem
- Latin: Universitatis Medicinalis Leopoliensis
- Former names: Lviv State Medical Institute; Lviv State Medical University; Danylo Halytsky Lviv National Medical University
- Motto: Aliis Inserviendo Ipse Consumor
- Motto in English: In serving others, I am consumed
- Type: Public medical university
- Established: 16 November 1784 (medical faculty); 1939 (independent institute)
- Rector: Orest Chemerys
- Academic staff: 1,339 (research and teaching staff)
- Students: 5,153 (degree students)
- Postgraduates: 2,520 (medical interns)
- Location: Lviv, Ukraine
- Campus: Urban
- Language: Ukrainian, English
- Website: new.meduniv.lviv.ua
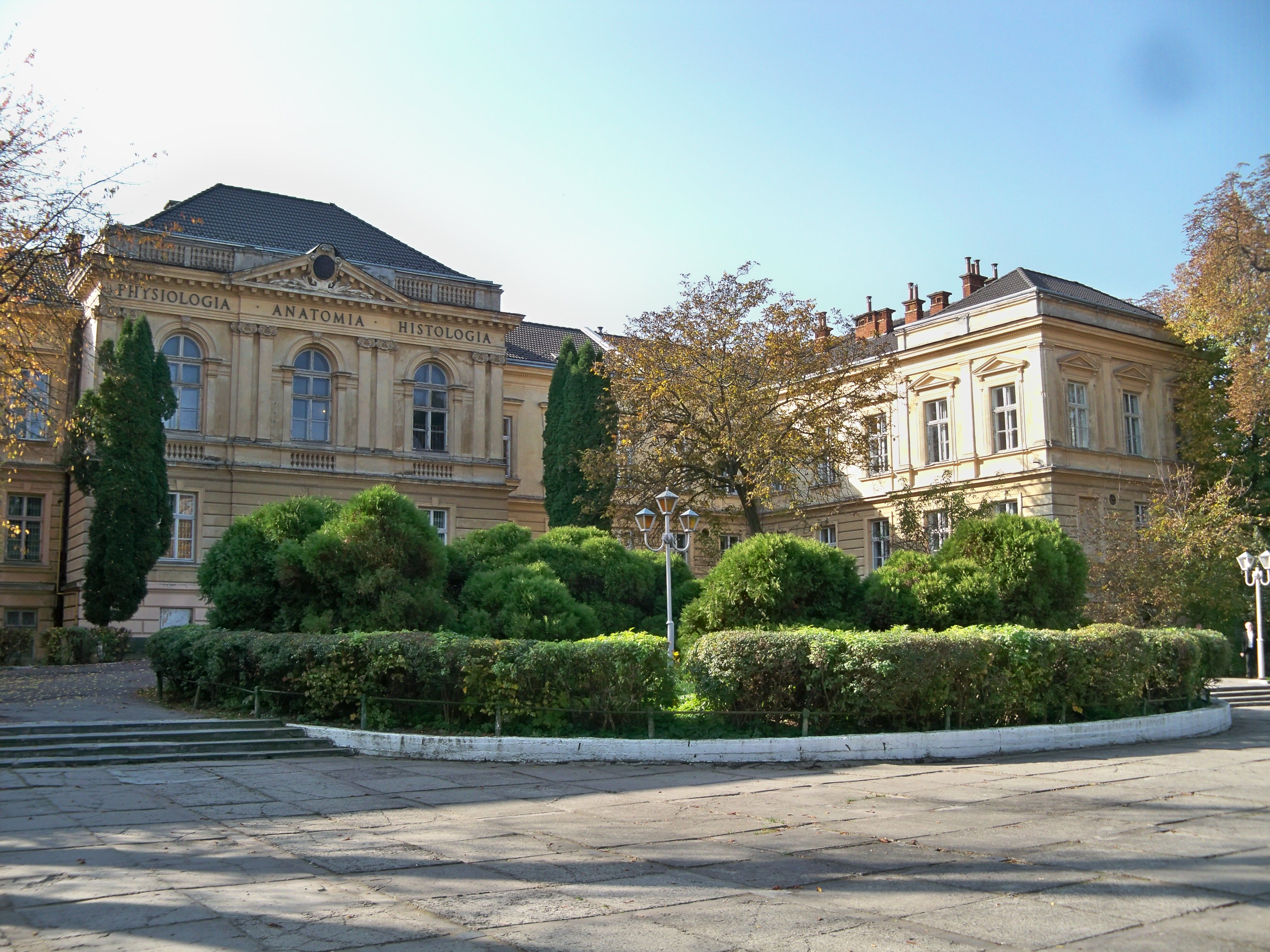

King Danylo Lviv National Medical University (Ukrainian: Львівський національний медичний університет імені Короля Данила; LNMU) is a public medical university in Lviv, Ukraine. Its origins are traced to the medical faculty established in 1784 at the University of Lviv under Emperor Joseph II. The medical faculty was revived as a full university faculty in 1894 and became an independent institution in 1939. It is named after Daniel of Galicia, the thirteenth-century ruler of the Principality of Galicia–Volhynia and the first crowned king of Ruthenia.

The university's historical academic community contributed to neurophysiology, biochemistry, infectious disease research, surgery and dentistry. Physiologist Adolf Beck, professor in Lviv from 1895, was among the pioneers of experiments on electrical activity in the brain, which preceded modern electroencephalography. Biochemist Jakub Karol Parnas established an influential research school in carbohydrate metabolism and lent his name to the Embden–Meyerhof–Parnas pathway. Microbiologist Rudolf Weigl developed an effective vaccine against epidemic typhus, a major advance in the prevention of a disease responsible for devastating epidemics.

Other notable members of the historical medical faculty included Ludwik Rydygier, a pioneer of gastric surgery who later served as rector of Lviv University; Antoni Cieszyński, associated with the development of dental radiography and the isometric technique; Edmund Biernacki, an early investigator of the erythrocyte sedimentation rate; and Henryk Kadyi, an anatomist who helped develop medical education in Lviv.

Among the institution's graduates and former students are Ludwik Fleck, the microbiologist and philosopher of science whose theory of thought collectives influenced the study of scientific knowledge; Stanisław Lem, the author of Solaris and The Cyberiad, who studied at the Lviv Medical Institute during the Second World War; and Volodymyr Ivasiuk, the physician, composer and songwriter associated with the Ukrainian popular song Chervona Ruta. Lem subsequently continued his medical studies in Kraków and did not graduate in Lviv.

The institution comprises six faculties, including two faculties of medicine, dentistry, pharmacy, postgraduate education and international students. Its educational and research facilities include teaching hospitals, medical laboratories, museums, a scientific library and a botanical garden. Its principal nineteenth-century medical buildings stand on Pekarska Street in the city's historic academic landscape. The university reports 5,153 degree students and 1,339 academic and teaching staff.

In the 2026 Osvita.ua national university rankings, it placed first among Ukraine's specialist medical universities.

== History ==
=== Origins of academic medicine in Lviv ===
The university traces its academic heritage to the history of medicine at the University of Lviv, one of the older centres of higher learning in Eastern Europe. On 20 January 1661, King John II Casimir Vasa granted the Jesuit college in Lviv the title of an academy. Although the privilege envisaged a university with several faculties, a fully developed medical faculty was not established before the suppression of the Society of Jesus and the closure of the college in 1773. The present medical university developed from the faculty created in 1784.

Under the reforms of Emperor Joseph II, the university in Lviv was reorganized in 1784 with faculties of theology, law, philosophy and medicine. The formal opening on 16 November 1784 is used as the conventional beginning of the medical university's institutional chronology. The history of medical education in the city, however, also includes the earlier Collegium Medicum, an institution established in 1773. Medical instruction was reorganized several times during the nineteenth century.

In 1805 the university was reduced to a lyceum, while specialist medical and surgical instruction continued in changing institutional forms. A university was re-established in 1817, but its comprehensive medical faculty was not fully restored at that date. For much of the nineteenth century, the training of physicians and pharmacists in Lviv involved arrangements distinct from those of a modern medical faculty. The restoration of full medical teaching became an important project for the city and the Galician authorities.

=== Re-establishment of the medical faculty, 1891–1918 ===
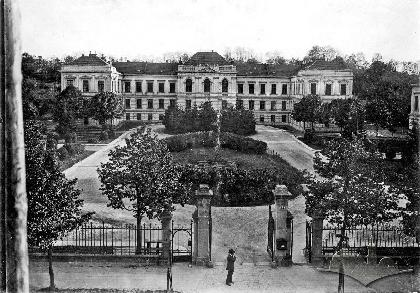
The medical faculty's principal building in a historical photograph from 1894.

A major reorganization began in 1891, when the imperial authorities approved the restoration of a complete medical faculty in Lviv. The project was supported by the governor of Galicia, Count Kazimierz Feliks Badeni, as well as the city's authorities and academics in Lviv and Kraków. The full medical faculty was ceremonially inaugurated in September 1894, during the reign of Emperor Franz Joseph I.

The university's medical complex was constructed on Pekarska Street. Architect Józef Braunseis designed an ensemble of buildings for descriptive anatomy and physiology, forensic medicine, pathology, chemistry and pharmacology. The three original buildings, with their façades arranged around an open courtyard, were constructed in a Neo-Renaissance style. Construction involved the architect and builder Ivan Levynsky. Later extensions provided facilities for clinical disciplines such as surgery, internal medicine, obstetrics and gynaecology. In March 1900, the faculty recorded its first group of sixteen medical graduates after the restoration of full medical education.

The faculty drew lecturers from other Central European medical schools, particularly Kraków, Vienna and Heidelberg. Anatomist Henryk Kadyi played a prominent part in the development of the restored medical faculty. Surgeon Ludwik Rydygier became professor and head of its surgical clinic in 1897; Adolf Beck, previously associated with the Jagiellonian University and the physiologist Napoleon Cybulski, was appointed professor of physiology in 1895. Their laboratories and clinics exemplified the development of experimental and specialist medical teaching around the turn of the century.

=== The Second Polish Republic, 1918–1939 ===
Following the dissolution of Austria-Hungary in 1918, Lviv became the subject of the Polish–Ukrainian War. Teaching was disrupted during the fighting and by subsequent regional instability. After the conflict, the medical faculty became part of Jan Kazimierz University, the name used by the University of Lviv during the Second Polish Republic. The faculty was not yet an independent medical university; its professors, clinics and students were affiliated with Jan Kazimierz University.

The restored medical faculty developed departments of internal medicine, surgery, paediatrics, dermatology, ophthalmology, otolaryngology, obstetrics and gynaecology, psychiatry, neurology, pathology, anatomy and forensic medicine. Its pre-clinical teaching included physiology, histology, pharmacology, medical chemistry, medical microbiology and hygiene. A separate pharmaceutical teaching division developed in the interwar period. During the 1930s the faculty operated a substantial network of departments and clinics, with research increasingly organized around specialist laboratories and clinical centres.

Researchers who worked in interwar Lviv included biochemist Jakub Karol Parnas, microbiologist Rudolf Weigl, dental surgeon Antoni Cieszyński, surgeons Roman Rencki and Władysław Dobrzaniecki, physiologist Leon Popielski, and others. Their research and clinical training formed part of a wider scientific environment that included the university's faculties of science and humanities, local hospitals, medical societies and the Polish and Ukrainian professional communities of the city. The interwar years saw the emergence of notable Lviv-based scientific schools in biochemistry, infectious diseases and clinical specialities.

==== Ukrainian-language medical education ====
Ukrainian-language higher education in interwar Lviv was constrained by the educational policies of the Polish state. In response, Ukrainian academics and students developed the underground Ukrainian Secret University between 1921 and 1925. Its medical faculty was separate from the officially recognized Jan Kazimierz University and operated despite the lack of adequate laboratory and clinical teaching facilities. Contemporary histories record ten medical departments and approximately 185 students. Lecturers included physician Marian Panchyshyn, as well as Ivan Kurovets and Maksym Muzyka. Some students subsequently pursued medical training abroad to complete clinical requirements.

=== The Second World War ===
After the Soviet invasion of Poland in September 1939, the medical faculty was separated from Lviv University to form the Lviv State Medical Institute, initially organized around medical and pharmaceutical education. This created the independent institution from which the present medical university developed. The institute was reorganized again following the German invasion of the Soviet Union in June 1941. Academic life in Lviv experienced severe repression and the destruction of much of its pre-war professional community.

In early July 1941 German forces carried out the Massacre of Lwów professors, murdering professors, physicians and members of their families. Victims connected to the medical faculty and its clinics included Antoni Cieszyński, Władysław Dobrzaniecki, Roman Rencki, Jan Grek, Włodzimierz Sieradzki, Tadeusz Ostrowski, Witold Nowicki and others. The killings destroyed an important part of Lviv's academic and clinical community. The destruction of Lviv’s Polish and Jewish academic communities profoundly affected the medical faculty.

The German occupation authorities permitted restricted medical and natural-sciences vocational courses from 1942, known officially as the Staatliche Medizinisch-Naturwissenschaftliche Fachkurse. The courses provided limited medical education during the occupation. Marian Panchyshyn and other physicians were associated with their organization. Some of the medical faculty's institutions and library collections were looted or destroyed, while other books and teaching materials were saved by staff.

Rudolf Weigl's institute continued work on a vaccine against epidemic typhus during the occupation. Its vaccine-production programme employed members of Lviv's intelligentsia, including some individuals otherwise threatened by Nazi persecution. The history of this institution has become an important subject in the study of medicine, science and survival under occupation.

=== Soviet period, 1944–1991 ===
After the return of Soviet rule in 1944, the Lviv State Medical Institute reopened and was integrated into the educational and healthcare systems of the Ukrainian Soviet Socialist Republic. The academic staff and student body changed considerably as a result of the war, post-war population transfers and Soviet higher-education policies. The institute expanded medical and pharmaceutical teaching while continuing the use of pre-war buildings and developing new clinical bases. Ukrainian and Russian languages were used in academic and professional life, with Russian dominant in the training of international students during parts of the Soviet period.

The institute developed research and clinical teaching in internal medicine, surgery, obstetrics, paediatrics, infectious diseases, pathology, public health and several laboratory disciplines. Soviet-era departments also contributed to the institute's present facilities and collections, including the scientific library, medical museums and teaching laboratories. In 1961 the institute began expanding programmes for students from other countries, establishing an international-education tradition that continued after Ukrainian independence.

=== Independent Ukraine ===
Following Ukraine's independence in 1991, the institute remained an important medical-training institution in western Ukraine. It obtained university status in 1996, adopted the name of Daniel of Galicia in 1998 and was awarded national-university status in 2003.

From the late 1990s, English-medium instruction for international medical students became a significant part of the university's education programme. The institution also expanded postgraduate medical education and relationships with clinical facilities. Its teaching structure came to include separate faculties of medicine, dentistry, pharmacy, international students and postgraduate education, alongside research laboratories, a medical college and a scientific library.

After the beginning of the full-scale Russian invasion of Ukraine in February 2022, university staff and students participated in emergency medical education, volunteer assistance, patient care and support for displaced people and military personnel. The institution describes cooperation with hospitals and military medical services in the western part of the country, including involvement of surgical and trauma departments in treating casualties and providing rehabilitation support.

In October 2026 it adopted the name King Danylo Lviv National Medical University. The university is administered under the Ukrainian Ministry of Health, with Orest Chemerys serving as rector.

== Campuses ==
=== Historic medical campus ===
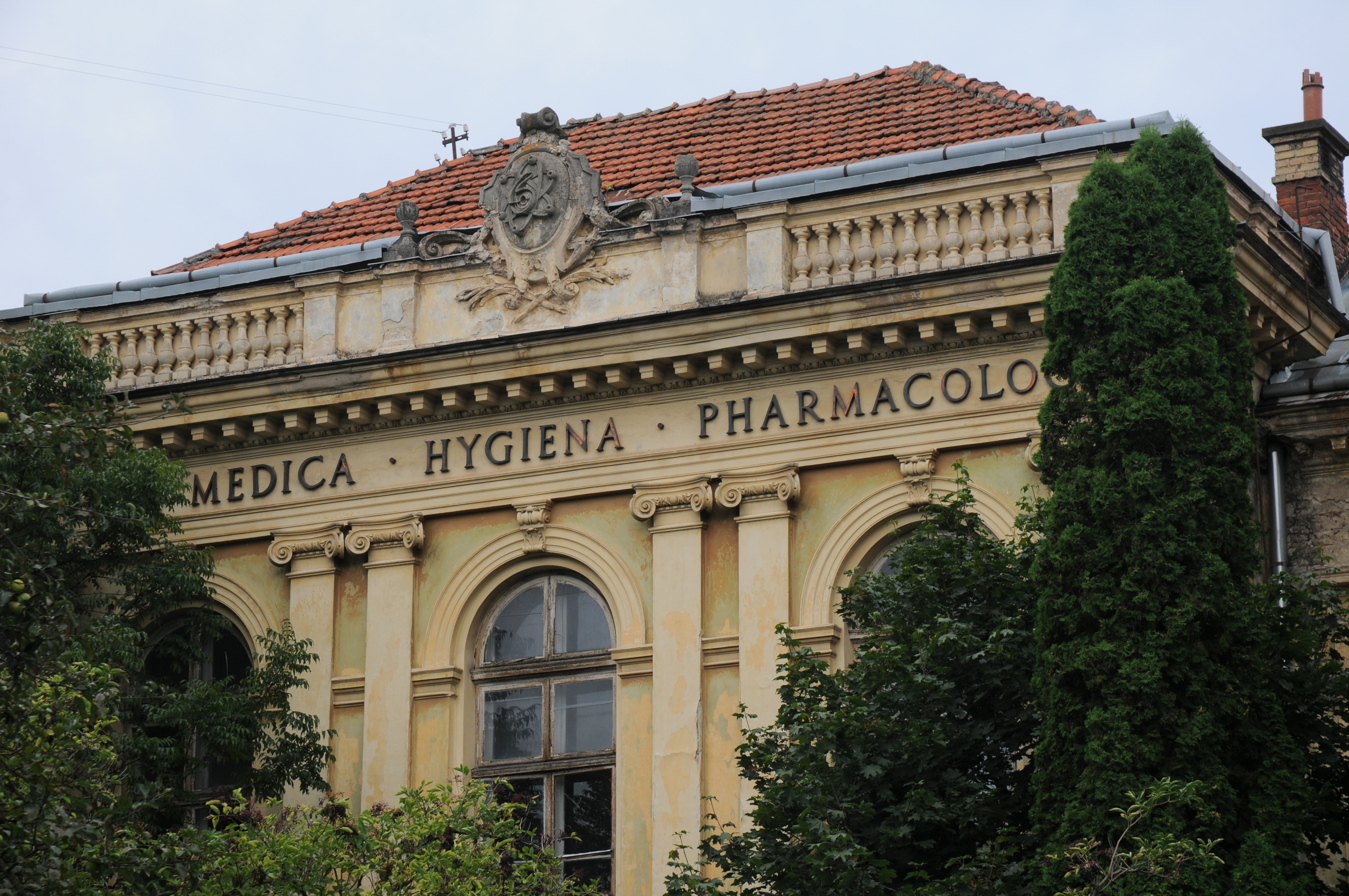
Part of the nineteenth-century medical faculty complex on Pekarska Street.

The university's historic buildings stand on Pekarska Street, east of central Lviv. The ensemble at number 52 was built for the re-established medical faculty during the 1890s, according to plans by architect Józef Braunseis. The anatomy building forms the central element of the complex, flanked by buildings historically dedicated to pathology and pharmacology. The three buildings enclose a forecourt, while the façades incorporate elements of Neo-Renaissance historicism. The complex is an example of late nineteenth-century purpose-built university architecture in Galicia.

The central teaching building included lecture halls and specialist anatomy and physiology facilities. Historical descriptions emphasize the principal stairway and large amphitheatre-style lecture theatre. Other medical facilities developed along the same street as new clinics and departments were established, and the surrounding grounds retained elements of a landscaped academic precinct. A monument to physicians killed during the Second World War was erected in front of the oldest university building in 1975.

The present university uses a wider range of teaching and administrative buildings, including premises at Pekarska Street 69. An institutional profile lists 15 university educational buildings and nine student residences, alongside research, clinical and social infrastructure.

=== Teaching hospitals and clinical facilities ===
The university's medical and health-sciences education is closely linked to healthcare institutions in Lviv and the surrounding region. Its faculties operate clinical departments in hospitals, outpatient facilities and specialist medical centres. The university's own institutional profile lists 49 clinical departments using a large network of affiliated healthcare institutions, as well as specialist facilities for dentistry and clinical training.

The university also operates a university hospital and a dental medical centre, and its clinical base includes general medicine, surgery, obstetrics and gynaecology, paediatrics, psychiatry, neurology and other specialties. Hospital-based learning forms part of undergraduate medical curricula, medical internships, residency and continuing professional education. Facilities for simulation-based teaching, laboratory diagnostics and pharmaceutical practice supplement instruction at clinical departments.

=== Botanical garden ===
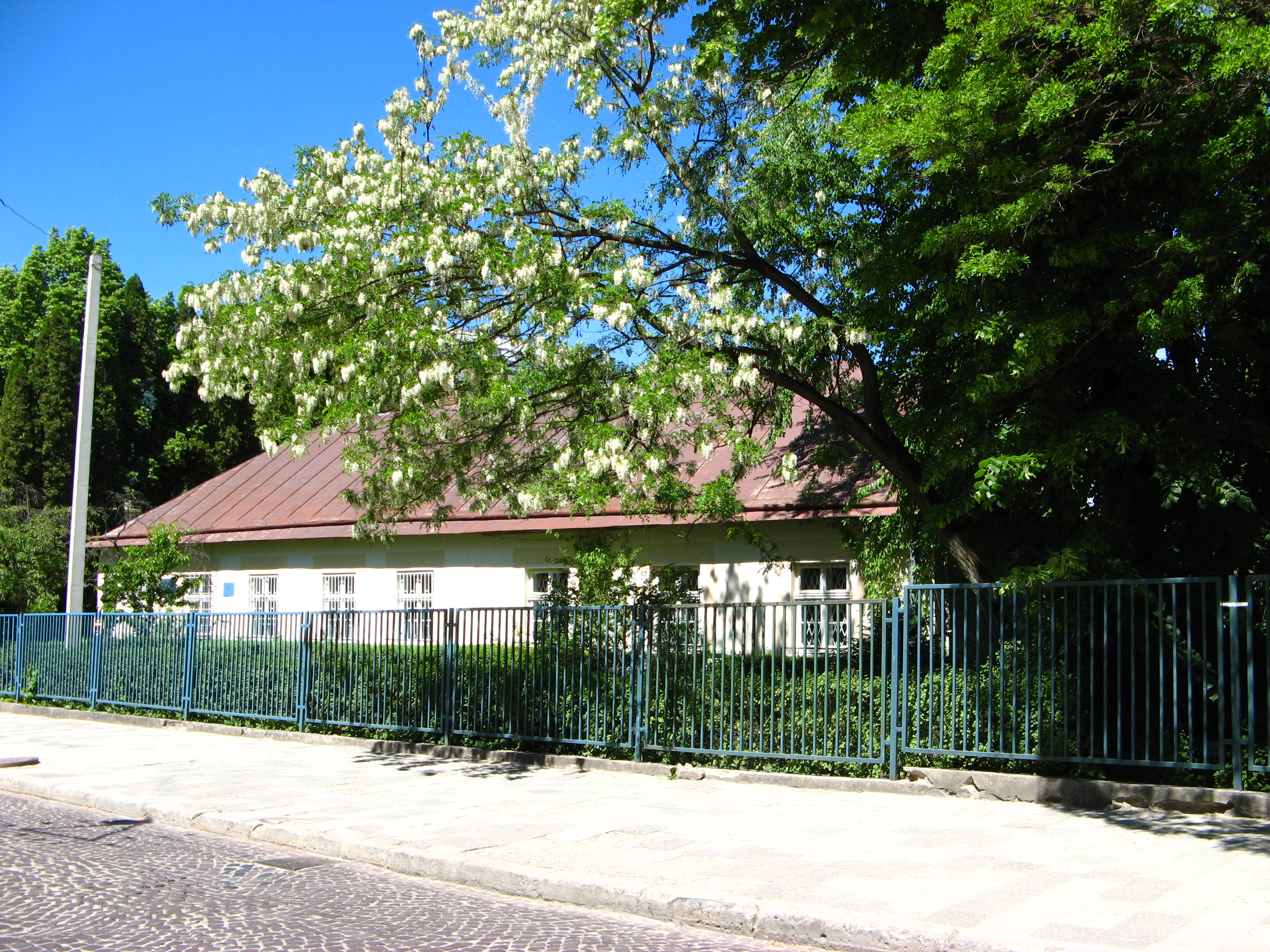
Educational facilities at the university's botanical garden.

The university's botanical garden was established by botanist Tadeusz Wilczyński, who developed its first collections of medicinal plants in 1929–1930. Its two principal areas are situated near the medical faculty buildings on Pekarska Street. Originally intended to support education in pharmacognosy and medicinal botany, the garden grew into a teaching and research collection and was later granted environmental protection.

The garden occupies approximately 1.5 hectares and includes an educational building, research plots, a greenhouse, trees and shrubs, and areas devoted to medicinal flora. A university description reports more than 900 taxa of higher plants, including approximately 200 species cultivated under glass. Students of pharmacy and other disciplines use the collections to study plant identification, ecology, cultivation methods and the origins of medicinal substances. Visits are organized by prior arrangement.

=== Scientific library, collections and museums ===
The scientific library was established as part of the independent medical institute in 1939. Its initial holdings included approximately 27,000 volumes transferred from the library of Lviv University, including medical texts in Polish, German, English and French. World War II disrupted library activities and caused the destruction or dispersal of some collections. After 1944 the collections were gradually rebuilt and expanded for clinical teaching and research.

The university's institutional profile describes a library collection of approximately 650,000 items, combining historical medical works, contemporary textbooks, periodicals and electronic resources. It maintains educational and scientific information services for students, staff and healthcare professionals. The institution also maintains medical museums and teaching collections, including displays of human anatomy, pathology, the history of medicine and dentistry.

== Organization and administration ==
=== Governance ===
The university is administered by a rector, vice-rectors and an Academic Council under the jurisdiction of the Ministry of Health of Ukraine. The state education registry identifies Orest Chemerys as rector of the university in November 2026.

=== Faculties and academic units ===
The university currently lists six faculties:

- Faculty of Medicine No. 1;
- Faculty of Medicine No. 2;
- Faculty of Dentistry;
- Faculty of Pharmacy;
- Faculty of Postgraduate Education;
- Faculty of International Students.

The two medical faculties provide professional medical education, while the dentistry and pharmacy faculties train students for their respective clinical and pharmaceutical professions. The faculty for international students coordinates aspects of programmes for students admitted from abroad. The postgraduate faculty provides continuing education and other training for qualified medical practitioners. The university additionally includes a medical college and departments and centres for clinical research, education and public health.

The institute's older disciplinary organization featured more than twenty medical and scientific fields, including internal medicine, surgery, neurology, psychiatry, dentistry, pharmacology, pathology and anatomy. During the interwar period departments and laboratories were organized within the medical faculty of Jan Kazimierz University, whereas later Soviet and independent-Ukrainian structures developed the present network of faculties and clinical departments.

=== Academic community ===
The university reports 1,339 research, teaching and educational staff, including 197 holders of higher doctorates and 823 holders of candidate-level research qualifications, with 154 professors and 469 associate professors.

The university reported 5,153 students in degree programmes, 2,520 medical interns and approximately 10,070 participants in continuing professional education. The profile also stated that more than 800 international students from almost 30 countries attended the university, with many taking English-medium programmes.

== Academics ==
=== Education and degrees ===
The university provides programmes in medicine, dentistry, pharmacy and other health-related disciplines, together with postgraduate training, doctoral studies and professional education. Clinical teaching is integrated with affiliated hospitals and university facilities. Medical students undertake preclinical instruction in anatomy, physiology, pathology, biochemistry and pharmacology before clinical rotations across internal medicine, surgery, paediatrics, obstetrics and other specialties.

In addition to professional medical and pharmacy training, the university offers doctoral study, postgraduate clinical education and continuing professional development. English-language programmes have attracted students from Europe, Asia, Africa and the Americas.

=== Research and scientific legacy ===
The historical medical faculty developed research traditions in experimental physiology, biochemistry, infectious diseases, surgery and dentistry.

==== Neurophysiology and the beginnings of electroencephalography ====
Adolf Beck was appointed professor of physiology at the medical faculty in Lviv in 1895. While working previously at the Jagiellonian University under Napoleon Cybulski, Beck had recorded spontaneous and stimulus-related electrical phenomena in animal brains, including changes following sensory stimulation. These experiments, undertaken in Kraków during the late 1880s and early 1890s, became part of the early history of the electroencephalogram and the investigation of cerebral localization. His subsequent professorship in Lviv helped establish a school of experimental physiology focused on the nervous system and other physiological processes.

Beck's research used electrical responses to investigate the functional organization of the cerebral cortex and the relationship between stimulation and nervous-system activity. He trained younger scholars, developed laboratory teaching and advanced the institutional presence of physiology in Lviv. His earliest experimental recordings were made in Kraków before his appointment in Lviv, where he developed experimental physiology and medical teaching.

==== Biochemistry and the study of glycolysis ====
Jakub Karol Parnas became professor and head of the department of biochemistry in Lviv in 1922. He established an influential biochemical school concerned with muscle metabolism, enzymatic reactions, ammonia production and carbohydrate transformations. His laboratory studied the mechanisms through which cells obtain and transfer energy, making Lviv an important interwar centre of biochemical research.

Parnas's research contributed to the pathway of glucose breakdown now commonly known as the Embden–Meyerhof–Parnas pathway, named in part for his work. The discoveries of the Lviv group were linked to broader international developments in enzymology and intermediary metabolism. Parnas's subsequent academic career and the fate of his laboratory were profoundly affected by the Second World War and Soviet political repression.

==== Infectious diseases, microbiology and the typhus vaccine ====
Rudolf Weigl developed one of the first effective vaccines against epidemic typhus, an infectious disease spread by lice and caused by Rickettsia prowazekii. His work built on methods for studying the pathogen in laboratory hosts and provided an important advance in preventive medicine. The Lviv research and production facility became widely known for its work on typhus during the interwar period and the Second World War.

During the German occupation, the Weigl Institute's programme was connected with efforts to preserve scientific activity and to protect members of Lviv's intellectual community from persecution through work at the institute. Vaccine research and production took place under coercive wartime conditions, and the institute's history has been examined in research on medicine under totalitarian rule.

Ludwik Fleck, a graduate of the Lviv medical faculty in 1922, pursued research in microbiology, immunology and infectious diseases, including work connected with typhus. Beyond laboratory medicine, he became internationally influential through his theory that scientific facts develop within historically conditioned thought collectives and thought styles. His 1935 book Genesis and Development of a Scientific Fact is regarded as an important work in the philosophy and sociology of science.

==== Surgery, clinical medicine and haematology ====
Ludwik Rydygier became professor of surgery in Lviv in 1897 and later served as rector of Lviv University. He had previously earned a reputation for pioneering operations on the stomach, including procedures associated with the development of modern gastrointestinal surgery. In Lviv he contributed to surgical teaching, clinical practice and the training of surgeons.

Edmund Biernacki joined the medical faculty in Lviv in the early twentieth century and became an associate professor of general and experimental pathology. He was one of the pioneers of using the erythrocyte sedimentation rate as a clinical laboratory test. His early research on erythrocyte sedimentation preceded his appointment in Lviv.

Among other notable medical academics associated with the faculty were internist Antoni Władysław Gluziński, surgeons Antoni Jurasz and Władysław Dobrzaniecki, pathologist Witold Nowicki, and other researchers working in surgery, internal medicine, paediatrics and pathology.

==== Dentistry and radiology ====
Antoni Cieszyński, head of dentistry in Lviv from 1913, was an influential figure in the emergence of modern dentistry as an academic discipline. He developed the principle of isometry in dental radiography, designed to reproduce the actual dimensions of teeth in radiographs, and authored technical studies and teaching materials. He also led the development of dental clinical instruction at Lviv University and served in academic administration. He subsequently helped establish dentistry as a clinical teaching discipline in Lviv.

=== Reputation and rankings ===
In the 2026 Osvita.ua national rankings, Lviv National Medical University placed first among specialist medical universities in Ukraine.

=== Contemporary research infrastructure ===
The university maintains research activities in clinical and preventive medicine, pharmacy, biological and medical sciences and related disciplines. Its research infrastructure includes central scientific laboratories, pharmaceutical and toxicological facilities, a research institute for epidemiology and hygiene, and services for electronic microscopy, biostatistics, clinical simulation and digital health. University publications and the national research-organization portal identify work in clinical medicine, public health, microbiology, molecular research and medical education.

The research institute for epidemiology and hygiene operates or coordinates scientific facilities addressing epidemiological threats, vector-borne and bacterial infections, vaccine-preventable diseases, immunology and toxicology. Clinical departments and affiliated hospitals also provide opportunities for research related to diagnosis, patient management, rehabilitation and the health of populations affected by war.

=== Publications and scientific library ===
University-associated journals include Acta Medica Leopoliensia (Lviv Medical Journal), Lviv Clinical Bulletin, medical law and preventive-medicine periodicals, and publications covering clinical specialties. The university's research profile additionally lists the Proceedings of the Shevchenko Scientific Society: Medical Sciences among its associated publications. The institutional printing and publishing facilities support textbooks, research publications, conference proceedings and educational materials.

The scientific library supports these activities with medical monographs, journal collections, textbooks and electronic information services. Its historical holdings, formed partly from the medical collection of the older University of Lviv, are also a resource for the study of the history of medicine in Galicia and Eastern Europe.

=== International cooperation ===
International teaching and research collaboration forms part of the university's institutional activities. Its published profile identifies cooperative relationships with medical universities in Wrocław, Warsaw, Poznań, Lublin and Gdańsk, as well as with Maastricht University and other international partners. A university partnership agreement with the University of Glasgow was concluded in 2022 through a programme linking Ukrainian and British medical institutions.

The university participates in international academic mobility, research collaborations and medical training through Erasmus+ and other programmes.

== Student activities ==
=== Student organizations and scientific societies ===
The university has a student council and other representative organizations involved in student affairs, extracurricular activities and communication with the administration. Student scientific societies and a council of young scientists organize seminars, academic meetings and research presentations.

Student clubs have historically included music, choral singing, traditional dance and creative workshops. Earlier institutional descriptions identified the folk-dance ensemble Horytsvit, the student choir Muses of Hippocrates and the folk ensemble Medicus.

=== International student life ===
The university has offered education to international students since the Soviet period and expanded English-language instruction from 1997. Its faculty for international students helps organize academic matters for students admitted from abroad. The university provides education in Ukrainian and English.

=== Volunteering and community engagement ===
Students and faculty have participated in volunteer, healthcare and social-support activities. After February 2022, the university described involvement in medical aid, emergency-care training, assistance to internally displaced people and support for hospitals treating military and civilian casualties. Academic departments contributed through clinical services, rehabilitation and training in emergency medicine.

== Athletics ==
The university has clubs, sports facilities and a department of physical education and sports medicine. Its sports and recreation infrastructure has included the camp Medyk.

University sports activities include student tournaments in team sports, chess and table tennis, alongside recreational events.

== Notable people ==
=== Alumni and former students ===
The following individuals studied at the medical faculty of Lviv University or at the subsequent independent medical institute and university.

- Ludwik Fleck (1896–1961), Polish–Israeli physician, microbiologist and philosopher of science. He graduated from the medical faculty in 1922, later developing a theory of scientific knowledge centred on thought styles and thought collectives.
- Volodymyr Ivasiuk (1949–1979), Ukrainian composer, poet and physician, whose music, particularly "Chervona Ruta", became widely known in Ukrainian popular culture; he completed medical education in Lviv.
- Oleh Bereziuk (born 1969), Ukrainian psychiatrist, psychotherapist and politician; graduate of the Lviv Medical Institute.
- Oleh Tyahnybok (born 1968), Ukrainian physician and politician, known as the leader of the far-right Svoboda party; graduated from the Lviv State Medical Institute in 1993.
- Stanisław Lem (1921–2006), Polish novelist and essayist known for philosophical science fiction, including Solaris. He studied at the Lviv Medical Institute in 1940–1941 and resumed his studies in 1944, but completed neither his medical education nor a medical degree at Lviv.

=== Notable historical faculty and researchers ===
- Adolf Beck (1863–1942), professor of physiology from 1895, one of the pioneers in the recording of electrical activity of the brain.
- Edmund Biernacki (1866–1911), clinician and professor of pathology, associated with the development of the erythrocyte sedimentation rate as a clinical test.
- Antoni Cieszyński (1882–1941), professor of dentistry, associated with the development of radiographic techniques in dentistry.
- Henryk Kadyi (1851–1912), anatomist influential in the restoration of the medical faculty in the 1890s.
- Jakub Karol Parnas (1884–1949), biochemist whose Lviv school contributed to the biochemical understanding of glycolysis.
- Marian Panchyshyn (1882–1943), physician and Ukrainian medical educator who participated in medical teaching under changing regimes.
- Ludwik Rydygier (1850–1920), surgeon and professor at Lviv from 1897, previously known for pioneering gastric surgery.
- Rudolf Weigl (1883–1957), biologist and microbiologist who developed an effective vaccine against epidemic typhus.
- Władysław Dobrzaniecki (1897–1941), surgeon and academic among those murdered in July 1941.
- Witold Nowicki (1878–1941), physician and pathologist murdered during the German occupation.
- Włodzimierz Sieradzki (1870–1941), forensic-medicine professor killed during the massacre of Lwów professors.
- Antoni Jurasz (1882–1961), surgeon associated with the medical faculty in the interwar period.

== In popular culture ==
Polish science-fiction author Stanisław Lem described his admission to the Lviv Medical Institute and his experiences studying medicine during the Second World War in autobiographical accounts associated with his memoir Highcastle. Lem later became internationally known for works including Solaris, The Cyberiad and Summa Technologiae.

== See also ==
- University of Lviv
- Massacre of Lwów professors
- Scientific Library of Danylo Halytsky Lviv National Medical University
- List of medical universities in Ukraine
- List of universities in Ukraine

== Bibliography ==
- "Lviv National Medical University". Internet Encyclopedia of Ukraine. Canadian Institute of Ukrainian Studies.
- "Львівський національний медичний університет" [Lviv National Medical University]. Encyclopedia of Modern Ukraine (in Ukrainian).
- Coenen, Anton; Zayachkivska, Oksana (2013). "Adolf Beck: A pioneer in electroencephalography in between Richard Caton and Hans Berger". Advances in Cognitive Psychology. 9 (4): 216–221. doi:10.2478/v10053-008-0148-3. PMC 3902832.
- Kucharz, Eugeniusz J. (2017). "Sesquicentennial of the birth of Edmund Faustinus Biernacki, a discoverer of the erythrocyte sedimentation rate". Reumatologia. 55 (1): 24–28. doi:10.5114/reum.2017.66684. PMC 5380769.
