= Wachholz =

Wachholz and Wacholz are German surnames. Notable people with the surnames include:

- Antoni Wachholz (1814–1873), a Polish historian and rector of Jagiellonian University
- Kevin Wacholz (born 1958), American wrestler, ring name Nailz
- Leon Wachholz (1867–1942), Polish scientist and medical examiner
- Steve Wacholz (born 1962), American heavy metal drummer

== See also ==
- 8501 Wachholz
- Wachholtz
