= National and University Library =

National and University Library or National University Library may refer to:

- Australian National University Library
- National and University Library "St. Kliment of Ohrid", North Macedonia
- National and University Library of Bosnia and Herzegovina
- National and University Library of Iceland
- National and University Library of Slovenia
- National and University Library of the Republika Srpska, Bosnia and Herzegovina
- National and University Library in Zagreb, Croatia
- Turin National University Library, Italy

== See also ==
- Academic library
- National library
- Society of College, National and University Libraries
- National Academic Library (Strasbourg)
- Scientific Library of Danylo Halytsky Lviv National Medical University
