= Kazimiera Bujwidowa =

Polish social activist, publisher, feminist and atheist

- Born: 16 October 1867; Warsaw, Congress Poland, Russian Empire
- Died: 8 October 1932 (aged 64); Kraków, Poland
- Occupation(s): Feminist, suffragette, writer, and Laboratory Technician
- Spouse: Odo Bujwid

Kazimiera Bujwidowa, née Klimontowicz, (16 October 1867 – 8 October 1932) was a Polish feminist and social activist.

== Life ==
Bujwidowa was born on 16 October 1867 in Warsaw, Congress Poland, the illegitimate child of Ludwika and Kazimierz Klimontowicz. Her father acknowledged her and supported her financially, but she was raised by her mother and then by her aunt, Karolina Petronella Klimontowicz, after her mother's death. She attended a private boarding school and qualified as a private tutor after graduation. Women were not allowed to attend the University of Warsaw at that time so Bujwidowa enrolled in a dressmaking course and attended courses at the underground Flying University in the late 1880s. She married the bacteriologist and social worker Odo Bujwid in 1886 and became her husband's assistant and laboratory technician. They had four daughters and two sons together. When Bujwid was appointed as a professor at Jagellonian University in 1893, they moved to Kraków in Austrian Poland and she became an administrator at the Institute for the Production of Sera and Vaccines, headed by her husband. During World War I, she and her husband operated a hospital for Polish soldiers in Austro-Hungarian service. In 1918 Bujwidowa became manager of the institute, retaining her position until her death on 8 October 1932 in Kraków.

== Work ==
Bujwidowa was initially involved in campaigns to improve education and literacy in both Warsaw and Kraków; she was a member of the board of directors of the Society of Elementary Schools (Polish: Towarzystwo Szkół Ludowych) from 1899 to 1901, having been involved since her arrival in Kraków. She also organized the Kraków Reading Room for Women (Polish: Czytelnia dla kobiet) and became its chairwoman. "Bujwidowa considered the roles of mothers and schools crucially important in the creation of a better society. Women, therefore, were to be professionally trained in pedagogy, psychology and hygiene." Bujwidowa is credited with starting the first junior school for girls and for campaigning to see women entering Jagiellonian University as they did in 1897.
