= Henryk Hilarowicz =

Polish surgeon

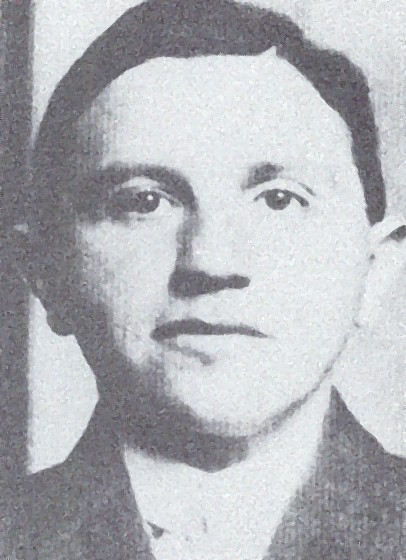
Henryk Hilarowicz

Henryk Hilarowicz (1890 – 3 or 4 July 1941) was born in Warsaw, Congress Poland, Russian Empire. He was a Polish surgeon and professor at the Jan Kazimierz University in Lwów. He was murdered by the Nazis in the Massacre of Lwów professors on 3 or 4 July 1941 in Lwów, Nazi-occupied Poland.
