= Lviv National Stepan Gzhytsky University of Veterinary Medicine and Biotechnology =

University in Ukraine

Coordinates: 49°50′13″N 24°02′34″E

Stepan Gzhytskyi National University of Veterinary Medicine and Biotechnologies Lviv
- Львівський національний університет ветеринарної медицини та біотехнологій імені Степана Ґжицького
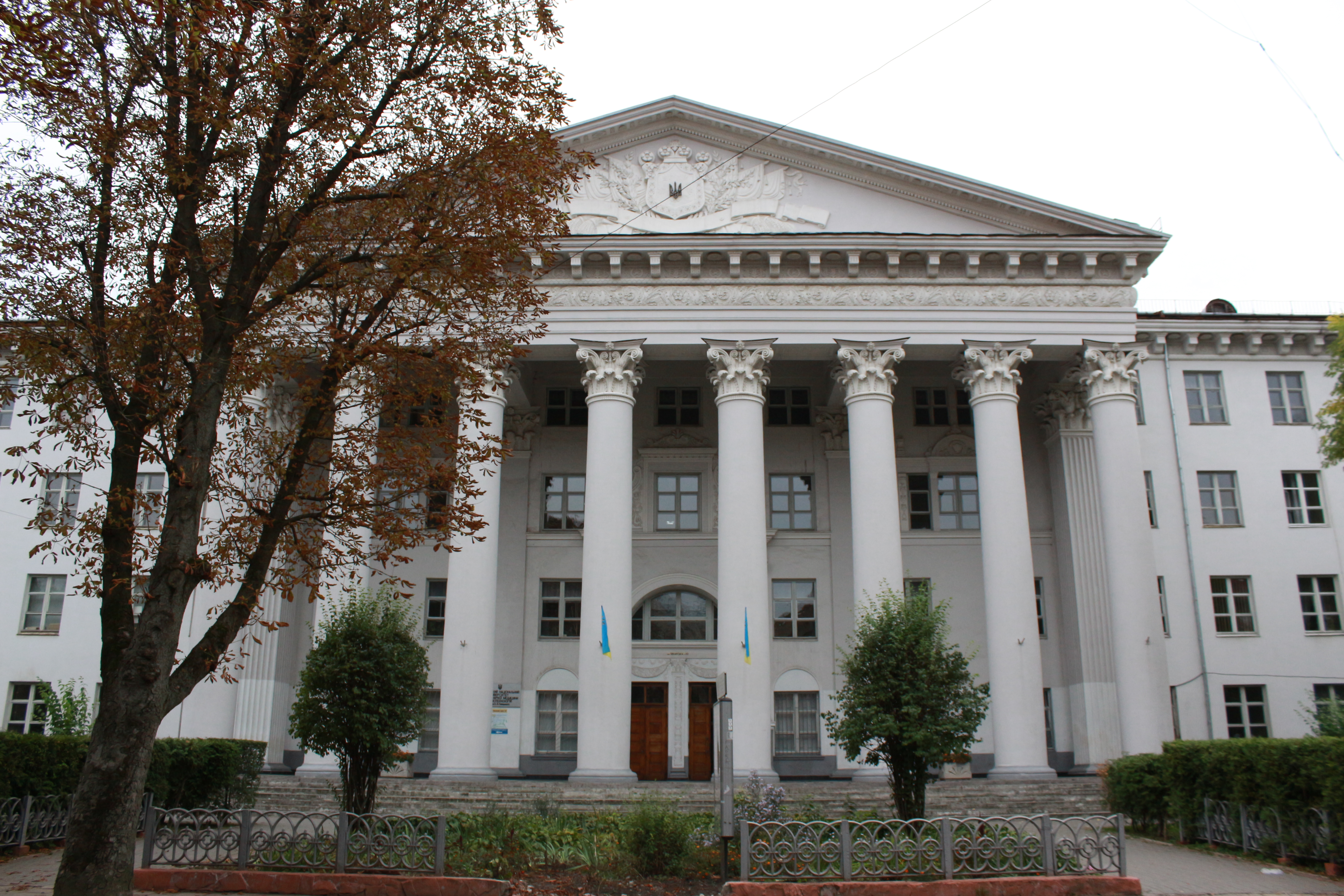
- Motto: Hominum animaliumque saluti (Latin)
- Established: 1784
- Accreditation: Ministry of Education and Science of Ukraine
- Chancellor: Volodymyr Stybel
- Students: 3014 in full-time tuition, 1358 in tuition by correspondence
- Location: Pekarska Street, 50, Lviv, Ukraine
- Website: lvet.edu.ua/en/
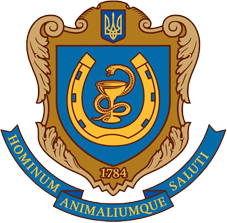

The Stepan Gzhytskyi National University of Veterinary Medicine and Biotechnologies Lviv is a public university located in Lviv, Ukraine.

== Overview ==
Stepan Gzhytskyi National University of Veterinary Medicine and Biotechnologies, located in Pekarska street, 50, Lviv is a complex of education, science, close cooperation with agricultural production and education of future specialists in the spirit of patriotism and cultural wealth. The major structural unit in the system of providing professional educational services is a Department. The University has 31 departments. Moreover, the structural unit providing educational services, including second higher education, advance training and retraining of personnel is the Institute of Extended Training and retraining of AIC Specialists.

There are more than four thousand full-time and extramural students studying in the University. Training of masters is carried out in five specialities. There are four faculties of full-time education, Faculty of Distance Education, Institute of Extended Training and Retraining AIC Specialists. The University continues its work concerning official recognition of diplomas of Ukrainian agricultural universities by the universities of developed countries.

The University provides educational services in such areas: veterinary science, food technology and engineering, technology of producing and processing livestock products, fish industry and aquaculture, specific categories (quality, standardization and certification), economics and business, management and administration, ecology, environment protection and law.

The other major units, which facilitate the educational process, are: scientific library, scientific and production complexes "Davydivsky" and "Komarnitsky", Department of Practise, Information Technology Centre with the technical and educational services. The University implemented a program of integration science and educational process. 59 branches of departments were established, based on the best scientific institutions and production units (companies, enterprises, associations). The University provides training of specialists for the state budget, preferential government loans, funds of individuals and entities. The percentage of state orders is 65% in full-time department and 35% in extramural studies.

The main aim is to strengthen the cult of knowledge. Recently, it has become a good tradition to refer the best students of the University for Practice to United Kingdom, Germany, Netherlands, and Ireland.

== History ==
Stepan Gzhytskyi National University of Veterinary Medicine and Biotechnologies Lviv (alternative spelling: Grzycki) is one of the oldest higher educational institutions in Ukraine.The roots of the University go to 1784 when a veterinary department was set up at Lviv University.

In Austria, Emperor Joseph II introduced educational reform, according to which there were only three universities on the territory of empire: in Vienna, Prague and Lviv. Lviv University received the status of university in October, 1784 and began to teach veterinary medicine and then started the development of veterinary medicine as a science in Galicia. At first they wanted to establish Veterinary school in Lviv like in Vienna but founded only the fifth university chair, the chair of veterinary medicine at the Medical Faculty of the University. The first professor and chairman was Georg Chmel (1747–1805) graduator of Vienna Veterinary School. He was an author of first veterinary works in Lviv. In 1881–1882 academic year the Veterinary School was founded in Lviv. Its full name was Kaiser-King Veterinary School together with school of forging horses and clinic for animals in Lviv. The Director of that school was Piotr Seifman (October 1, 1881), the former director of Warsaw Veterinary School and a director of Kazan's Veterinary Institute. At the same time Henryk Kadyi and Antoni Barański became professors. In four years (February 19, 1885) the school gave the first five diplomas of veterinary doctors.

According to resolution from December 1896 Lviv Veterinary School received status of High School (Academy) (October 1, 1897) In September 1908 the Academy received the right to give the scientific degree – the doctor of veterinary medicine and for special services – honorary doctorate (doctor honoris causa). From 1909 Rector was elected among the professors of the Academy for two years. Józef Szpilman (1855–1920) was the first rector of Lviv Veterinary Academy.

Before World War I at the Academy worked such famous professors as Stanisław Królikowski, Włodzimierz Kulczycki (Volodymyr Kulchytskyj), Zygmunt Markowski, Paweł Kretowicz and Teofil Hołobut. In 1917 Volodymyr Kulchytskyj became the Rector. He was the first Ukrainian rector of the Academy, a man of the encyclopedic knowledge, well-known anatomist and orientalist.

On December 12, 1922 the Academy received the name Academy of Veterinary Medicine in Lwów (Polish: Akademia Medycyny Weterynaryjnej we Lwowie) that lasted till the outbreak of World War II (1939). Professor Wacław Moraczewski (1867–1950) took a special place in the history of the Academy. He was a famous Polish biochemist, talented academic and public figure, literature critic, expert in arts and music and a sportsman. He had a great impact on the Ukrainian writer Vasyl' Stefanyk. He also made a great influence on scientific progress of Ukrainian scientist S. Gzhytskyj (1900–1976) and the University was named in his honour.

In the aftermath of the Soviet invasion of Poland (1939) the Academy of Veterinary Medicine in Lwów was renamed Lviv Veterinary Institute. Professor Ivan Chynchenko (1905–1993) became the first Soviet director of the institute. He was a famous scientist. Both important and dramatic was war and post war times. German administration turned Lviv higher schools into professional courses to lower the quality of Slavic specialists. After the completion of these courses a certificate was given instead of a diploma. The directors of these courses were Otto Habersang and Prof. Uergen Witte.

After the unsuccessful Lwów uprising (1944) and the subsequent incorporation of the territories of Poland by the Soviet Ukraine (1945) the institution of higher education resumed its scientific activity as a Soviet institute. In 1945 the Academy of Veterinary Medicine in Lwów was transferred from Lwów to Wrocław, Poland, and nowadays it operates as Wrocław University of Environmental and Life Sciences. In 1949 the second faculty was opened – Zootechnical (since 1956 – Zooingineering, since 2003 – the faculty of Biology and Technology). In times of an independent Ukraine such faculties were founded: in 1991 – Sanitary and Technological Faculty, in 2004 – the Faculty of Food Technologies, in 2002 – the Faculty of Economics and Management. Furthermore, these the Faculty of Extramural Education, the centre of artistic selfactivity and the institute of Post-Graduate education are actively working here.

In 1992 Lviv Academy of Veterinary Medicine regained its former name. In 2003 the Academy assumed the status "National" and was named after its student and then worker – the chief of Biochemistry Department, prominent scientist, and corresponding member of NAS and an academician of Ukrainian Agricultural Academy professor Stepan Gzhytskyj (1994). An academic council regained its right to assign the honorary status of a doctor (1998).

== Campuses and buildings ==
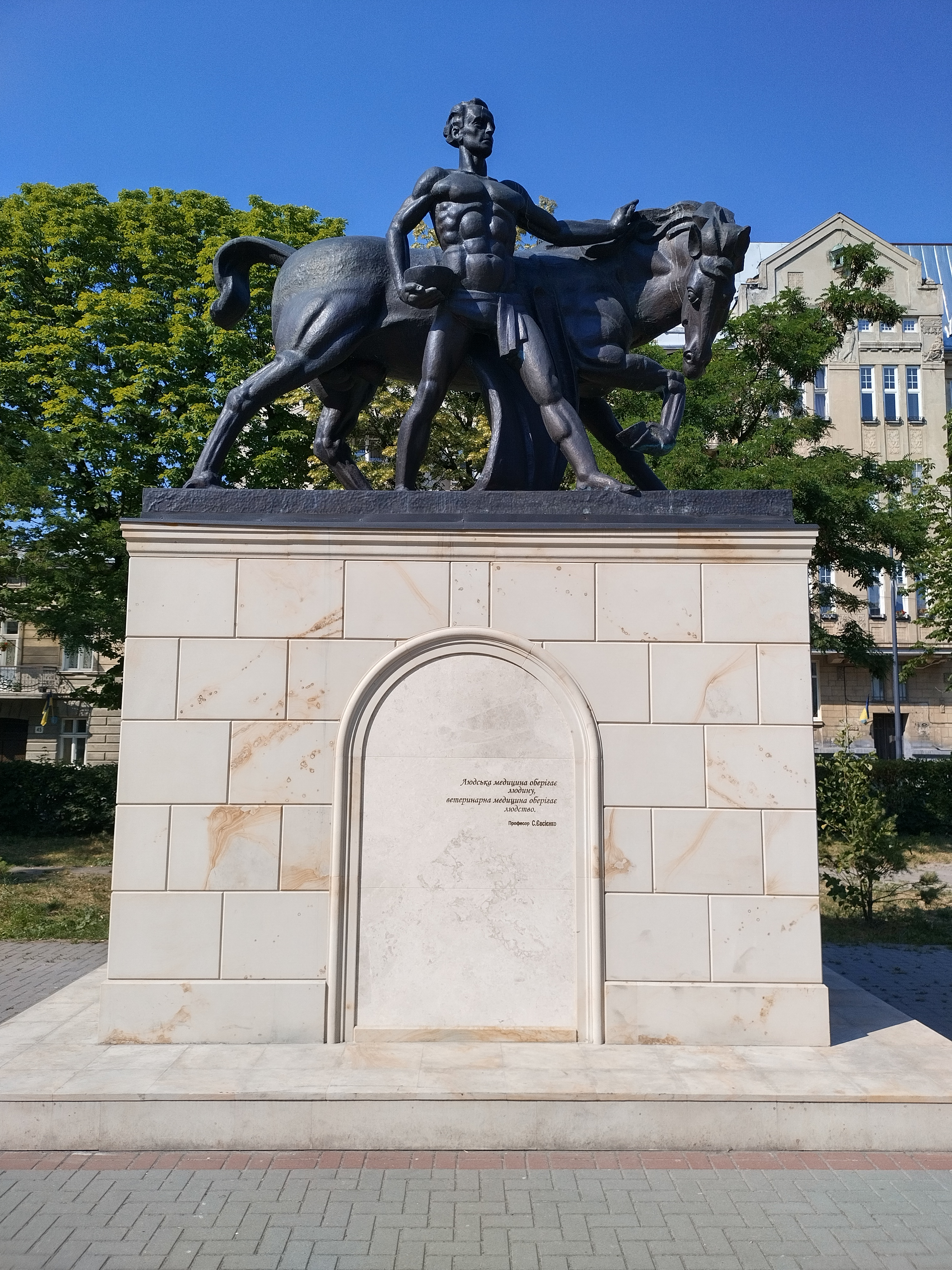
A monument to veterinarians

All buildings of the university (main building, housing departments, research library, sports complex and 4 campus dormitories with a dining room) are compactly located in the central part of the city.

Educational research and production centers of the University are located in farming towns of Lviv region: ERPC "Komarnivskyj" – in Horodok' district at a distance of 50 km from the city, ERPC "Davydivskyj" – in Pustomyty' district at a distance of 10 km from the city.

=== Institutes and faculties ===
Nowadays there are 5 faculties at the University:

- Veterinary Medicine with the following specializations: veterinary pharmacy; quality, standardization and certification of agricultural products, ichthyology, diseases of small animals, laboratory affairs, veterinary ecology.
- Biology and Technology Faculty – specialty: technology of production and processing of animal production with the following specializations: apiculture, fur farming, poultry raising, fish-breeding, management and water bio resources.
- Faculty of Food Technology and Ecology with the following specializations; technology of meat preservation and processing, technology of milk preservation and processing, technology of fat and fat substitutes, ecology and environmental protection quality, economic of environment, standardization and certification with the following specializations: veterinary sanitation, technology of hide and fur, ecosecurity of food products.
- Faculty of Economics and Management in specialties: marketing, management and organizational management;
- Faculty of extramural study which trains technologists of production and processing of animal products, marketers, managers, ecologists.

A centre of artistic amateur performances is a separate structural unit, which is the basis of specialists training in the field of organization and conducting of cultural, sporting and educational actions. The Institute of Post – Diploma Studies and Retraining of AIC cadres re-educates specialists providing them with a second diploma of state higher education. Six research institutes are functioning at the university now:

- Research Institute of Biotechnological Monitoring;
- Research Institute of Biotechnological Principles of Animals Productivity Increase;
- Research Institute of Cattle Breeding, Horse Breeding and Immunogenetics;
- Research Institute of Physiology and Ecoimmunology of Animals and Birds;
- Institute of Management and Information Technologies;
- Research Institute of Ichthyopathology Introduction and Intensive Technologies in fish breeding.

Three Specialized Scientific Councils work at the University. They work in 10 fields; physiology of people and animals, veterinary obstetrics and biotechnology of reproduction, veterinary sanitation and hygiene, veterinary expertise, veterinary pharmacology, and toxicology, animals feeding and feeds technology, breeding and selection of animals, and ecology. Post-graduate students are trained in 25 specialties. Doctoral studies were opened in 9 specialties in 2001.

== See also ==
List of universities in Ukraine
