= Gustaw Bikeles =

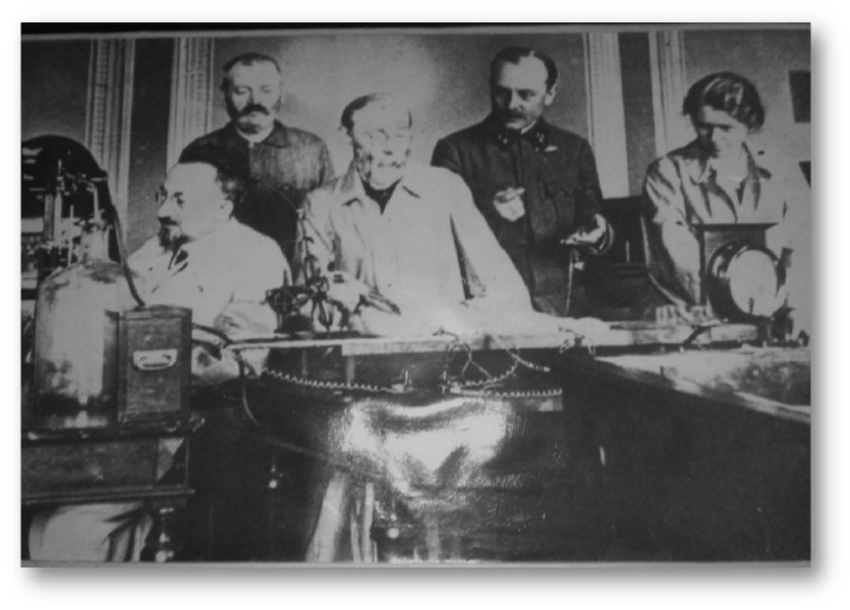
Adolf Beck (left most) and Bikeles (middle, front row) conducting experiments in the University of Lviv

Gustaw Bikeles (September 1, 1861 – November 4, 1918) was an Austro-Hungarian physician and pioneer of neurophysiology. Bikeles sign is a clinical test used for determining neurological damage in the upper arm.

Bikeles was born in Lemberg (then part of Austro-Hungary, now Lviv in Ukraine) in a Jewish family. He studied locally before going to Berlin to study philosophy but quit to study medicine in Vienna. Graduating in 1890 he began to work with Richard von Krafft-Ebing and Heinrich Obersteiner. He then moved to the Jan Kazimierz University working on neurology. He became a lecturer in 1900, associate professor in 1906 and full professor in 1913. During World War I he moved to Vienna.

Bikeles studied nervous disorders particularly involving neurodegeneration such as multiple sclerosis. He noted inflammatory changes during the course of the disease. He collaborated with Adolf Beck with experiments on dogs, cats and rabbits to examine nerve tissue using electrical signals. Bikeles sign is an established orthopaedic and neurological test to detect damage in the nerves of the upper arm and spine. One of his students was Eufemiusz Herman.

Bikeles was killed by a stray bullet during the battle of Lviv.
