= Wachholtz =

Wachholtz is a surname. Notable people with the surname include:

- Jorge Wachholtz (1889–1981), a Chilean industrialist, businessman and politician
- Kyle Wachholtz (born 1972), an American former professional football player

== See also ==
- Wacholz
- Wachholz
