= Stefan Horoszkiewicz =

Polish pathologist and forensic pathologist

- Born: August 12, 1874; Lviv
- Died: March 12, 1945 (aged 70); Kraków
- Military career
- Branch: Land forces
- Rank: Lieutenant colonel doctor
- Unit: 7th Sanitary Battalion
- Conflicts: World War I
- Other work: Professor at Poznań University

Stefan Horoszkiewicz (August 12, 1874 – March 12, 1945) was a Polish forensic pathologist, professor at Poznań University, and a Lieutenant colonel doctor in the Polish Army.

== Biography ==
He was the son of the imperial-royal railway official Józef Horoszkiewicz (1841–1922) and Olga née Werner (1845–1911). He completed high school in Lviv and medical studies in Kraków, where he obtained his doctorate in 1898. Until 1921, he worked at the Department of Forensic Medicine at Jagiellonian University and simultaneously practiced in hospital departments of surgery, internal medicine, and psychiatry. He passed the examination for government doctors in Galicia in 1902, then habilitated in forensic medicine in 1904, and became an associate professor in 1909. During World War I, he served in the Austrian army.

On November 18, 1918, Brigadier General Bolesław Roja "in recognition of extraordinary merits in military medical service" promoted him to the rank of Lieutenant colonel doctor, effective from December 1 of that year. On January 8, 1924, he was confirmed as a lieutenant colonel with seniority from June 1, 1919, and the 34th position in the corps of reserve medical officers, group of doctors. He was then assigned to the reserve of the 7th Sanitary Battalion in Poznań.

In 1921, he was appointed full professor and organizer and head of the Department of Forensic Medicine at the Faculty of Medicine at Poznań University. He quickly organized one of the best forensic medical facilities in Poland, which was equipped with modern scientific apparatus, creating chemical, serological, and forensic laboratories. This allowed for the preparation of a forensic medicine and criminology course in Poznań for the training of court clerks and assessors. He raised the level of forensic medical expertise in Greater Poland, enabling all kinds of expert opinions to be issued.

He was the Dean of the Medical Faculty at UP in the years 1922/23 and 1923/24. He was the author of 29 dissertations in various fields of forensic medicine. He moved to Lviv after the outbreak of the war and worked there in the neurological clinic. He moved to Kraków in 1940 and from 1941 for 2 years was the head of the Polish Welfare Committee for the Kraków district, then ran a medical analysis laboratory. He was buried at Rakowicki Cemetery in Kraków.

He was married since 1916 to Olga Rubin, a pediatrician, who was murdered by the Gestapo in 1942. He had a daughter, Maria, and a son, Andrzej.

He made a significant contribution to the development of forensic entomology. He also conducted experimental research with Prof. Leon Wachholz on the mechanism of drowning.

== Awards ==
- Knight of the Order of Franz Joseph – Austria-Hungary (1916).

== Bibliography ==
- Officers' Yearbook 1923. Warsaw: Ministry of Military Affairs. 1923.
- Gąsiorowski, Antoni; Topolski, Jerzy (1981). Wielkopolski Biographical Dictionary. Warsaw-Poznań: State Scientific Publishing House. p. 257. ISBN 83-01-02722-3.
- Heads of the Department and Institute of Forensic Medicine in Poznań 1921–2009
- Marcinkowski, T. (September 8, 1975). "[Professor Stefan Horoszkiewicz (1874-1945), founder of the Chair and Department of Forensic Medicine in Poznań]". Polski Tygodnik Lekarski (Warsaw, Poland: 1960). 30 (36): 1505–1507. ISSN 0032-3756. PMID 1099556.
