= Władysław Dobrzaniecki =

Polish physician and surgeon (1897–1941)

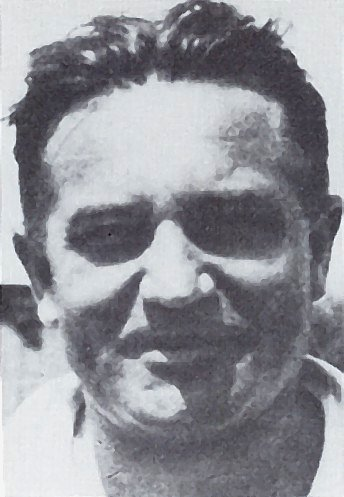
- Władysław Dobrzaniecki
- Born: September 24, 1897; Zielinka, near Borszczów, Poland
- Died: July 4, 1941 (aged 43); Lemberg, District of Galicia
- Occupations: Physician, Surgeon
- Known for: Precursor of plastic surgery in Poland
- Title: Titular Professor of Surgery

Władysław Dobrzaniecki (24 September 1897 – 4 July 1941) was a Polish physician and surgeon. He is known for his contribution to the study of otorhinolaryngology.

== Life ==
Władysław was since 1936 head of the Saint Zofia Children Hospital in Lwów, and since 1938 titular professor of surgery at the Lviv University. He was a precursor of plastic surgery in Poland.

== Death ==
He was murdered by the Germans in Lviv during the Massacre of Lvov professors.

== See also ==
Massacre of Lvov professors
