= Massacre of Lwów professors =

1941 mass murder of Polish academics by Nazi forces in present-day Lviv, Ukraine

Coordinates: 49.8285°N 24.0135°E

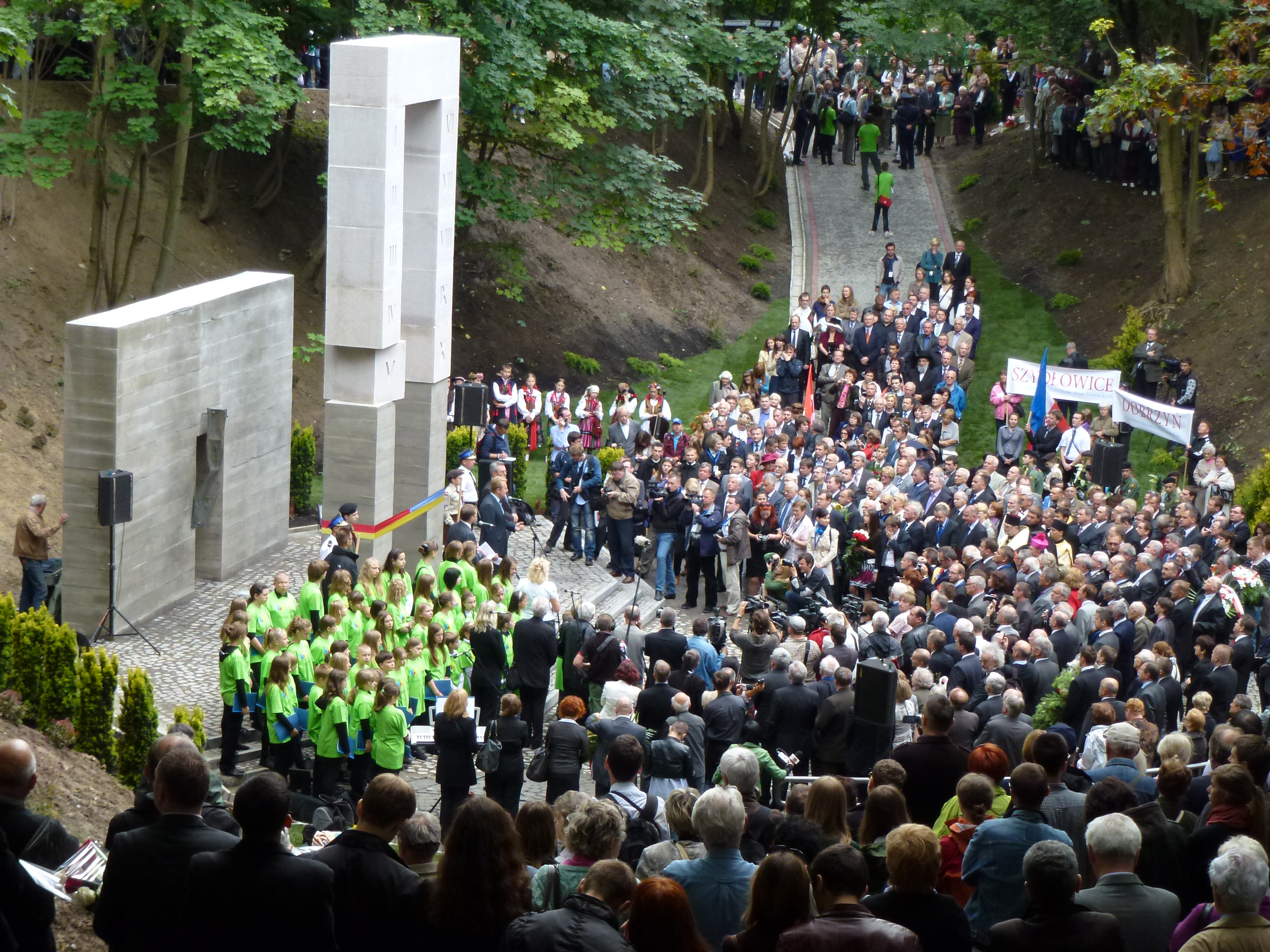
Unveiling of a new monument at the place of execution at Wuleckie Hills on 3 July 2011

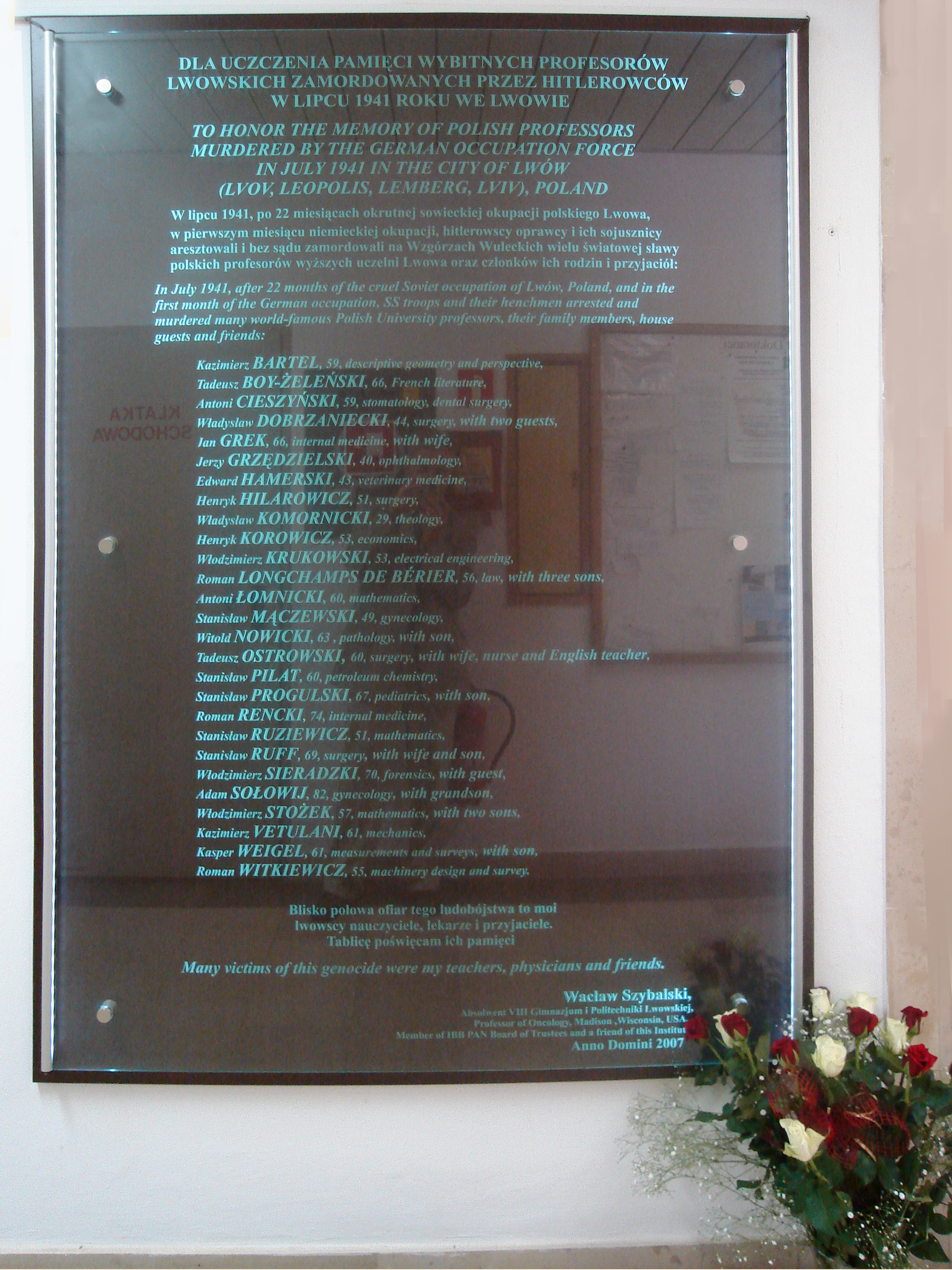
Plaque in IBB PAN in Warsaw

In July 1941, 25 Polish academics from the city of Lwów (now Lviv, Ukraine) along with 25 of their family members, were killed by Nazi German occupation forces and Ukrainian auxiliaries. By targeting prominent citizens and intellectuals for elimination, the Nazis hoped to prevent anti-Nazi activity and to weaken the resolve of the Polish resistance movement. According to an eyewitness the executions were carried out by an Einsatzgruppe unit (German: Einsatzkommando zur besonderen Verwendung) under the command of Karl Eberhard Schöngarth with the participation of Ukrainian translators in German uniforms.

== Background ==
Before September 1939 and the German invasion of Poland, Lwów, then in the Second Polish Republic, had 318,000 inhabitants of different ethnic groups and religions, 60% of whom were Poles, 30% Jews and about 10% Ukrainians and Germans. The city was one of the most important cultural centers of interwar Poland, housing five tertiary educational facilities, including Lwów University and Lwów Polytechnic. It was the home for many Polish and Polish Jewish intellectuals, political and cultural activists, scientists and members of Poland's interwar intelligentsia.

After Lwów was occupied by the Soviet Union in September 1939, Lwów University was renamed in honor of Ivan Franko, a major Ukrainian literary figure who lived in Lwów, and the language of instruction was changed from Polish to Ukrainian. Lwów was captured by German forces on 30 June 1941 after the German invasion of the Soviet Union. Along with German Wehrmacht units, a number of Abwehr and SS formations entered the city. During the German occupation of Poland, almost all of the 120,000 Jewish inhabitants of the city were killed, within the city's ghetto or in Bełżec extermination camp. By the end of the war, only 200–800 Jews survived.

To control the population, prominent citizens and intellectuals, particularly Jews and Poles, were either confined in ghettos or transported to execution sites such as the Gestapo prison on Pełczyńska Street, the Brygidki Prison, the former military prison at Zamarstynów and to the fields surrounding the city — in the suburb of Winniki, the Kortumówka hills and the Jewish Cemetery. Many of those killed were prominent leaders of Polish society: politicians, artists, aristocrats, sportsmen, scientists, priests, rabbis and other members of the intelligentsia. This mass murder is regarded as a pre-emptive measure to keep the Polish resistance scattered and to prevent Poles from revolting against Nazi rule. It was a direct continuation of the infamous German AB-Aktion in Poland, after the German invasion of the Soviet Union and the eastern half of prewar Poland fell under German occupation in place of that of the USSR. One of the earliest Nazi crimes in Lwów was the mass murder of Polish professors together with some of their relatives and guests, carried out at the beginning of July 1941.

== Killings ==
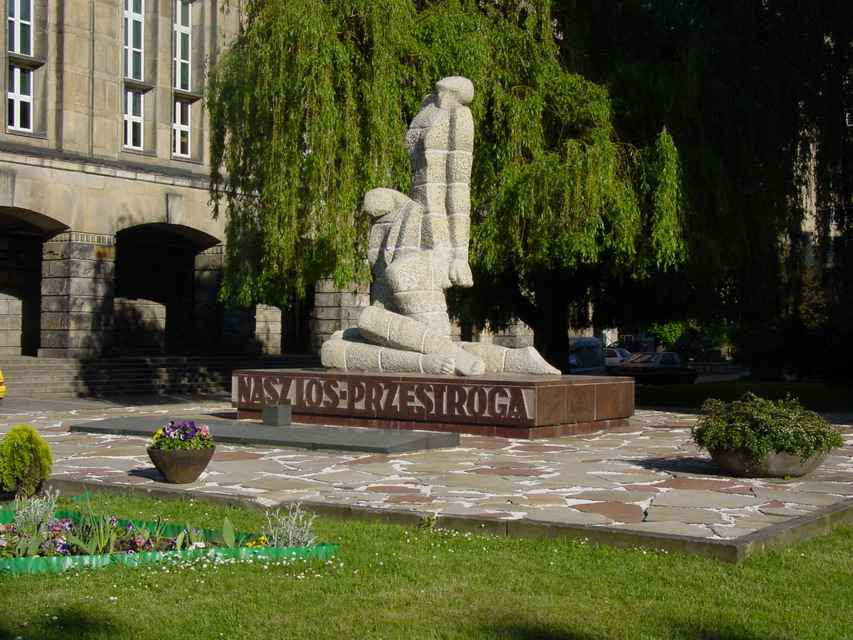
Monument to the victims in Wrocław, Poland

By 2 July 1941, the individual, planned executions continued. At approximately 3 o'clock in the afternoon, Professor Kazimierz Bartel was arrested by one of the Einsatzgruppen operating in the area. During the night of 3/4 July, several dozen professors and their families were arrested by German detachments – each one consisting of an officer, several soldiers, Ukrainian guides and interpreters. The lists were prepared by their Ukrainian students associated with OUN. Some of the professors mentioned on the lists were already dead, specifically Adam Bednarski and Roman Leszczyński. Among those arrested was Roman Rencki, a director of the Clinic for Internal Diseases at Lwów University, who was kept in an NKVD prison and whose name was also on the list of Soviet prisoners sentenced to death. The detainees were transported to the Abrahamowicz's dormitory, where despite the initial intention to kill them, they were tortured and interrogated. The head of the department in the Jewish hospital, Adam Ruff, was shot during an epileptic attack.

In the early morning of 4 July, one of the professors and most of his servants were set free while the rest were either brought to the Wulka hills or shot to death in the courtyard of the Bursa Abrahamowiczów building. The victims were buried on the spot, but several days after the massacre their bodies were exhumed and transported by the Wehrmacht to an unknown place. There are accounts of four different methods used by the German troops. The victims were either beaten to death, killed with a bayonet, killed with a hammer, or shot to death. The professors themselves were shot to death.

== Responsibility ==
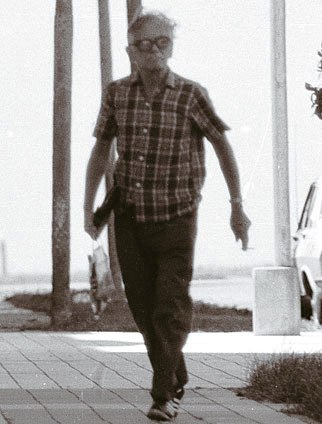
Walter Kutschmann in Miramar, Argentina, 26 December 1975

The decision was made at the highest level of Nazi Germany's leadership. The direct decision maker of the massacre was the commander of the Sicherheitspolizei (Befehlshaber der Sicherheitspolizei und des SD- BdS) in Krakau District of the General Government, Karl Eberhard Schöngarth. The following Gestapo officers also participated: Walter Kutschmann, Felix Landau, Heinz Heim (Chief of Staff Schöngarth), Hans Krueger and Kurt Stawizki. None of them were ever punished for their roles in the Lwów massacre, although Schöngarth, Landau, and Krueger were punished for other crimes, with Schöngarth being executed in 1946. Kutschmann lived under a false identity in Argentina until December 1975, when he was found and exposed by journalist Alfredo Serra in the resort town of Miramar. He was arrested ten years later in Florida, Buenos Aires, by Interpol agents but died of a heart attack in jail before he could be extradited to then West Germany, on 30 August 1986.

Some sources contend that members of the Ukrainian auxiliaries from the Nachtigall Battalion were responsible for the murders. According to the Canadian Institute of Ukrainian Studies, this claim originated with the Soviet sources and has been disputed. Memorial has published documents which claim to document the Nachtigall participation in those events as a KGB disinformation. Stanisław Bogaczewicz, of the Polish Institute of National Remembrance said that Nachtigall soldiers took part in the arrests, but not in the murders, and that their role in this event needs further investigation. Sociologist Tadeusz Piotrowski noted that while the Nachtigall role is disputed, they were present in the town during the events, their activities are not properly documented, and that at the very least they are guilty of the passive collaboration in this event, for not opposing the atrocities. According to a Lviv historian, Vasyl Rasevych, the claims that Ukrainians participated in the July 1941 massacre are untrue and that no archival evidence exists to support this contention.

== Aftermath ==
After World War II the leadership of the Soviet Union made attempts to diminish the Polish cultural and historic legacy of Lwów. Crimes committed east of the Curzon line could not be prosecuted by Polish courts. Information on the atrocities that took place in Lwów was restricted. In 1960, Helena Krukowska, the widow of Włodzimierz Krukowski, launched an appeal to a court in Hamburg. After five years the West German court closed the judicial proceedings. A West German public prosecutor claimed the people responsible for the crime were already dead; however, Hans Krueger, commander of the Gestapo unit supervising the massacres in Lwów in 1941, was being held in a Hamburg prison, having been sentenced to life imprisonment for the mass murder of Polish Jews of the Stanisławów Ghetto committed several weeks after his unit was transferred from Lwów. As a result, nobody has ever been held responsible for the killings of the academics.

In the 1970s, Abrahamowicz Street in Lviv was renamed Tadeusz Boy-Żeleński Street. Various Polish organisations have made deputations to remember the victims of the atrocity with a monument or a symbolic grave in Lviv. The case of the murder of the professors is currently under investigation by the Institute of National Remembrance. In May 2009, the monument to the victims in Lviv was defaced with red paint bearing the words "Death to the Lachs [Poles]". On 3 July 2011, a memorial dedicated to the Polish professors murdered by the Gestapo on 4 July 1941 opened in Lviv.

== Victims ==
Abbreviations used:

- UJK = Uniwersytet Jana Kazimierza (Lwów University, now Ivan Franko National University of Lviv)
- PSP = Państwowy Szpital Powszechny (National Public Hospital)
- PL = Politechnika Lwowska (Lwów Polytechnic, now Lviv Polytechnic National University)
- AWL = Akademia Weterynaryjna we Lwowie (Academy of Veterinary Sciences in Lwów)
- AHZ = Akademia Handlu Zagranicznego we Lwowie (Academy of Foreign Trade in Lwów)

=== Murdered in the Wulka hills ===
1. Prof Dr Antoni Cieszyński, Professor of Stomatology UJK
2. Prof Dr Władysław Dobrzaniecki, head of the ord. Oddz. Chirurgii PSP
3. Prof Dr Jan Grek, Professor of Internal Medicine, UJK
4. Maria Grekowa, wife of Jan Grek
5. Doc Dr Jerzy Grzędzielski, head of the Institute of Ophthalmology, UJK
6. Prof Dr Edward Hamerski, Chief of Internal Medicine, AWL
7. Prof Dr Henryk Hilarowicz, Professor of Surgery, UJK
8. Rev Dr Władysław Komornicki, theologian, a relative of the Ostrowski family
9. Eugeniusz Kostecki, husband of Prof. Dobrzaniecki's servant
10. Prof Dr Włodzimierz Krukowski, Chief of the Institute of Electrical Measurement, PL
11. Prof Dr Roman Longchamps de Bérier, Chief of the Institute of Civil Law, UJK
12. Bronisław Longchamps de Bérier, son of Prof. Longchamps de Bérier
13. Zygmunt Longchamps de Bérier, son of Prof. Longchamps de Bérier
14. Kazimierz Longchamps de Bérier, son of Prof. Longchamps de Bérier
15. Prof Dr Antoni Łomnicki, Chief of the Institute of Mathematics, PL
16. Adam Mięsowicz, grandson of Prof. Sołowij
17. Prof Dr Witold Nowicki, Dean of the Faculty of Anatomy and Pathology, UJK
18. Dr Med Jerzy Nowicki, assistant at the Institute of Hygiene, UJK, son of Prof. Witold Nowicki
19. Prof Dr Tadeusz Ostrowski, Chief of the Institute of Surgery, UJK
20. Jadwiga Ostrowska, wife of Prof. Ostrowski
21. Prof Dr Stanisław Pilat, Chief of the Institute of Technology of Petroleum and Natural Gases, PL
22. Prof Dr Stanisław Progulski, pediatrician, UJK
23. Andrzej Progulski, son of Prof. Progulski
24. Prof Dr Roman Rencki, Chief of the Institute of Internal Medicine, UJK
25. Dr Med Stanisław Ruff, Chief of the Department of Surgery of the Jewish Hospital
26. Anna Ruffowa, Dr Ruff's wife
27. Inż. Adam Ruff, Dr Ruff's son
28. Prof Dr Włodzimierz Sieradzki, Dean of the faculty of Court Medicine, UJK
29. Prof Dr Adam Sołowij, former Chief of the Department of Gynaecology and Obstetrics of the PSP
30. Prof Dr Włodzimierz Stożek, Dean of the Faculty of Mathematics, PL
31. Inż. Eustachy Stożek, assistant at the Politechnika Lwowska, son of Prof Włodzimierz Stożek
32. Emanuel Stożek, son of Prof Włodzimierz Stożek
33. Dr. Tadeusz Tapkowski, lawyer
34. Prof Dr Kazimierz Vetulani, Dean of the Faculty of Theoretical Mechanics, PL
35. Prof Dr Kasper Weigel, Chief of the Institute of Measures, PL
36. Mgr Józef Weigel, son of Prof Kasper Weigel
37. Prof Dr Roman Witkiewicz, Chief of the Institute of Machinery, PL
38. Prof Dr Tadeusz Boy-Żeleński, writer and gynaecologist, Chief of the Institute of French Literature

==== Murdered in the courtyard of Bursa Abrahamowiczów, a former school in Lviv, now a hospital ====
1. Katarzyna Demko, English language teacher
2. Dr Stanisław Mączewski, head of the Department of Gynaecology and Obstetrics of the PSP
3. Maria Reymanowa, nurse
4. Wolisch (forename unknown), merchant

==== Murdered on 12 July ====
1. Prof Dr Henryk Korowicz, Chief of the Institute of Economics, AHZ
2. Prof Dr Stanisław Ruziewicz, Chief of the Institute of Mathematics, AHZ

==== Murdered on 26 July in Brygidki Prison ====
1. Prof Dr Kazimierz Bartel, former Prime Minister of Poland, former Rector of PL, Chairman of the Department of Geometry, PL

== See also ==
- Janowska concentration camp
- Intelligenzaktion
- Sonderaktion Krakau
- Ponary massacre
- NKVD prisoner massacres
- Anti-Polonism
- Jakub Karol Parnas
- Czarny Las Massacre
