= Antoni Cieszyński =

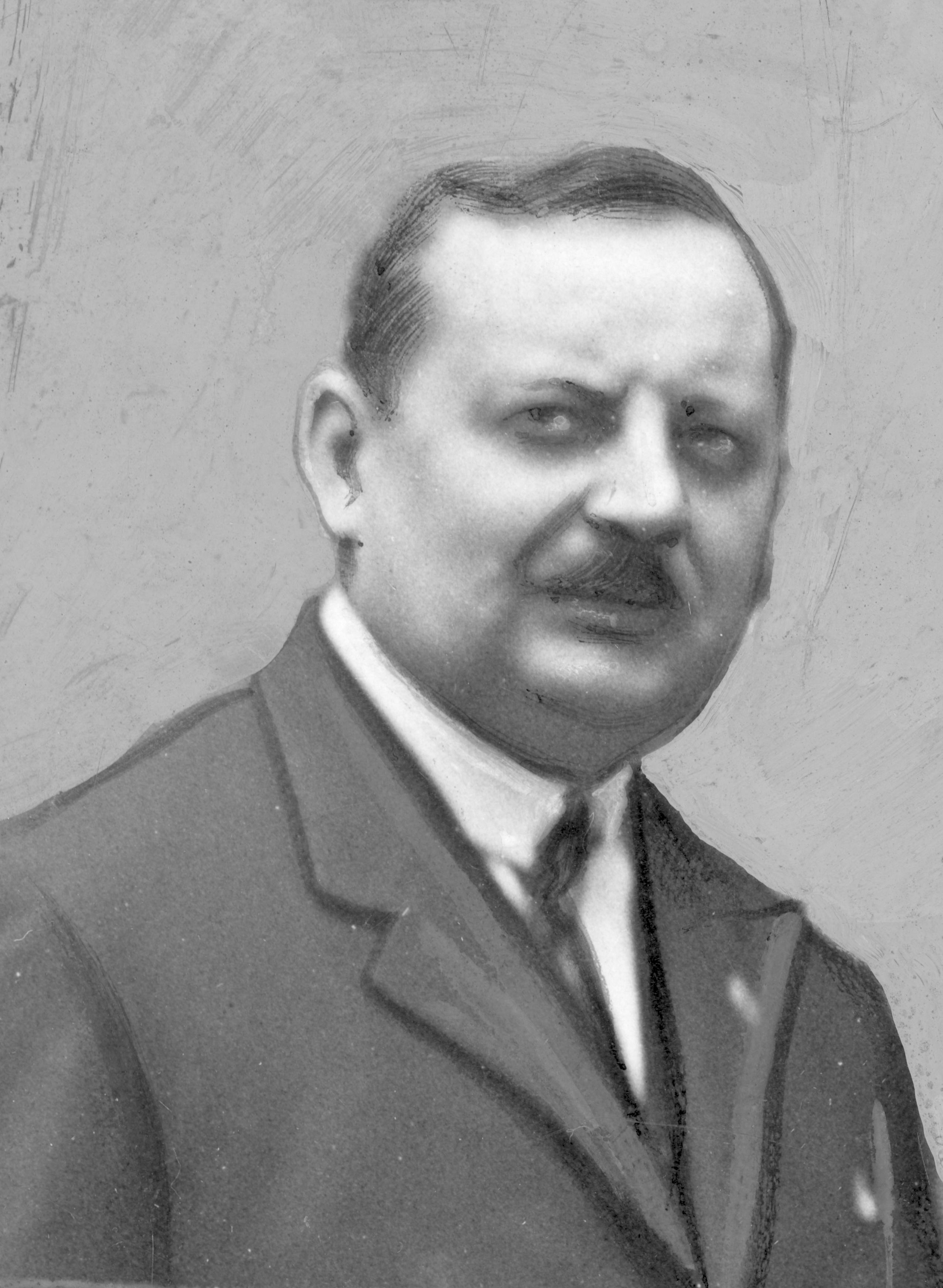
Antoni Cieszyński

Antoni Cieszyński (31 May 1882 in Oels (Oleśnica), Silesia, Germany – 4 July 1941 in Lwów, Poland) was a Polish physician, dentist and surgeon.

Cieszyński was a professor and head of the Institute of Stomatology at Lviv University. He became the editor and publisher of Polska Dentystyka in 1930; the journal was renamed Polska Stomatologia (Polish Stomatology) and Słowiańska Stomatologia (Slavic Stomatology). Among his contributions to dentistry are the rules of isometry that allow for the bisecting angle to accurately reproduce dimensions in x-radiology, and extraoral anæsthetising techniques.

During the WW2 in 1941 Cieszyński with a number of other Polish university professors was summarily executed by the invading German forces in Lviv during the massacre of Lviv professors.
