= Antoni Wachholz =

Polish historian

- Born: 6 February 1814; Biała, Austrian Empire
- Died: 18 July 1873 (aged 59); Kraków, Austria-Hungary
- Known for: Rector of Jagiellonian University and University of Lviv
- Children: Leon Wachholz
- Scientific career
- Fields: History
- Workplaces: Jagiellonian University, University of Lviv

Antoni Wachholz (or Anton Wacholz; 6 February 1814 in Biała – 18 July 1873 in Kraków) was a Polish historian and rector of Jagiellonian University in 1865. He was also a member of the Galician Diet during its first term.

After completing his studies, he worked at a school in Chernivtsi. In 1847, he was appointed to the Chair of General History at Jagiellonian University, but in 1848, he moved to the University of Lviv, where he served as dean and later as rector from 1857 to 1858. In 1860, he returned to Kraków, but due to his limited proficiency in Polish, he conducted lectures in German. He was appointed by Austrian authorities as rector of Jagiellonian University for the term 1864–1865.

He was married to Joanna Zagórska, and his son, Leon Wachholz, was a professor at Jagiellonian University. Antoni Wachholz was buried at Rakowicki Cemetery (section IX, south side).
