= Adolf Beck (physiologist) =

Polish physiologist

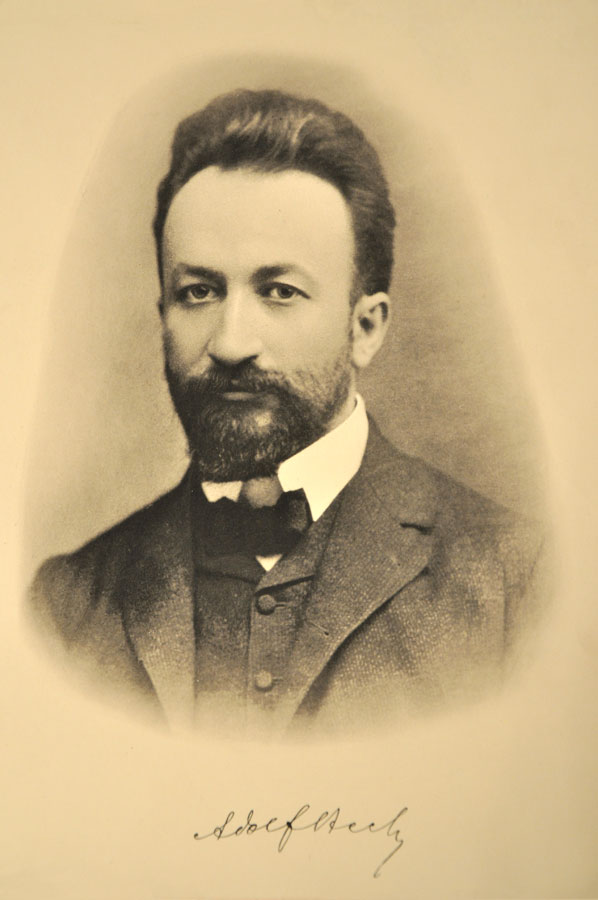
- Born: 1 January 1863; Kraków, Austrian Empire
- Died: August 1942 (aged 79); Lviv
- Education: Jagiellonian University
- Known for: Pioneer of electroencephalography (EEG)
- Scientific career
- Fields: Physiology
- Workplaces: Jagiellonian University; Lviv Academy of Veterinary Medicine; University of Lviv

Adolf Abraham Beck (1 January 1863, Kraków – August 1942, Lviv) was a Polish physician and professor of physiology at the University of Lviv. He is considered one of the pioneers of electroencephalography (EEG).

== Life and career ==
He was born on 1 January 1863, in Kraków, Galicia, into a poor Jewish family. During his academic career, Beck supported himself as a private tutor. Upon graduating with distinction from the gymnasium of his native city in 1884, he entered the Jagiellonian University in Kraków. In 1888, while still a medical student, Beck gained the prize of the university by a paper on the excitability of a nerve, afterward published under the title, "O pobudliwości różnych miejsc tego samego nerwu" (On the Excitability of a Nerve at Different Points). In 1889 he began to work with Napoleon Nikodem Cybulski (1854-1919).

In 1890 he received the degree of M.D., and in the same year published the results of his extensive research on electrical processes in the brain. His papers on this subject, "Die Bestimmung der Localisation des Gehirn- und Rückenmarksfunctionen Vermittelst der Electrischen Erscheinungen," 1890, and "Weitere Untersuchungen über die Electrischen Erscheinungen des Hirnrinde der Affen und Hunde," 1891 (in collaboration with Napoleon Cybulski), attracted wide attention in Germany, France, and England, and won for him a prominent position among students of physiology.

In 1889 Beck was appointed assistant in the physiological laboratory of the Jagiellonian University and he remained in this position until 1894, when he became privatdocent on the presentation of his thesis "Ueber die Physiologie der Reflexes." In the following year he was offered a chair of physiology as associate professor in the newly created medical department of the University of Lviv and in 1897 was appointed professor in the same institution.

Beck is considered one of the pioneers of electroencephalography (EEG).

Beck has received many marks of distinction from medical societies in recognition of his scientific investigations. His numerous contributions, published in German and in Polish, belong almost exclusively to the domain of physiology. To the investigations represented by these publications should be added the extensive work of research conducted on similar lines in the Physiological Institute of the University of Lviv under Beck's immediate supervision.

Beck was a member of the Polish Academy of Learning in Kraków. He was the first physiologist awarded with the Medal and a title of an Honorary Member of the Polish Physiological Society (Polskie Towarzystwo Fizjologiczne).

Beck was a Jew and after several Lviv professors were killed in the Wuleckie Hills, Zdzisaw Bieliski, took Beck and his son Henryk to a hiding place. Just before his 80th birthday Beck became unwell and had to be taken to a hospital. He was however revealed as a Jew and his son Henryk managed to provide his father a cyanide capsule so that he would not suffer in a gas chamber. He committed suicide at an unrecorded date in August 1942 in the Janowska concentration camp. Henryk became a gynaecologist, survived the war and became a chair of obstetrics in Wroclaw in 1946 but died shortly after. The only family member to survive well after World War II was Beck's daughter Jadwiga Beck-Zakrzewska.

== Works ==
- "Researches on the Sense of Taste in a Tongueless Human Being" (with Napoleon Cybulski) (in Polish) 1887
- "Die Ströme der Nervencentren," 1890
- "On the Present State of the Theory of Localizing the Functions of the Brain," (in Polish), 1892
- "Hermann Helmholtz " 1894
- "On the Vital Processes and Methods for Their Investigation," (in Polish), 1895; with Cybulski
- "Further Investigations on the Electrical Processes in the Brain" (in Polish), 1896
- "Dreams and Their Causes" in Polish, 1896
- "Die Erregbarkeit Verschiedener Nervenstellen" 1897
- "Zur Untersuchung der Erregbarkeit der Nerven" 1898
- "On Color-Blindness, Artificially Produced," in Polish and in German, 1899.
- "Zur Lehre Munk's über Beginn und Reihenfolge in der Ausbreitung der Bewegungen bei Rückenmarksreflexen, wie bei Tätigkeit der sogenannten „Prinzipalzentren“" 1910 (with Gustav Bikeles)
- "Die sogenannten Berührungsreflexe Munk's und die reflektorische Zehenbeugung bei Reizung der Fusssohle" 1910 (with Gustav Bikeles).

== See also ==
- List of Polish physiologists
- Timeline of Polish science and technology
