= Edmund Biernacki =

Polish physician

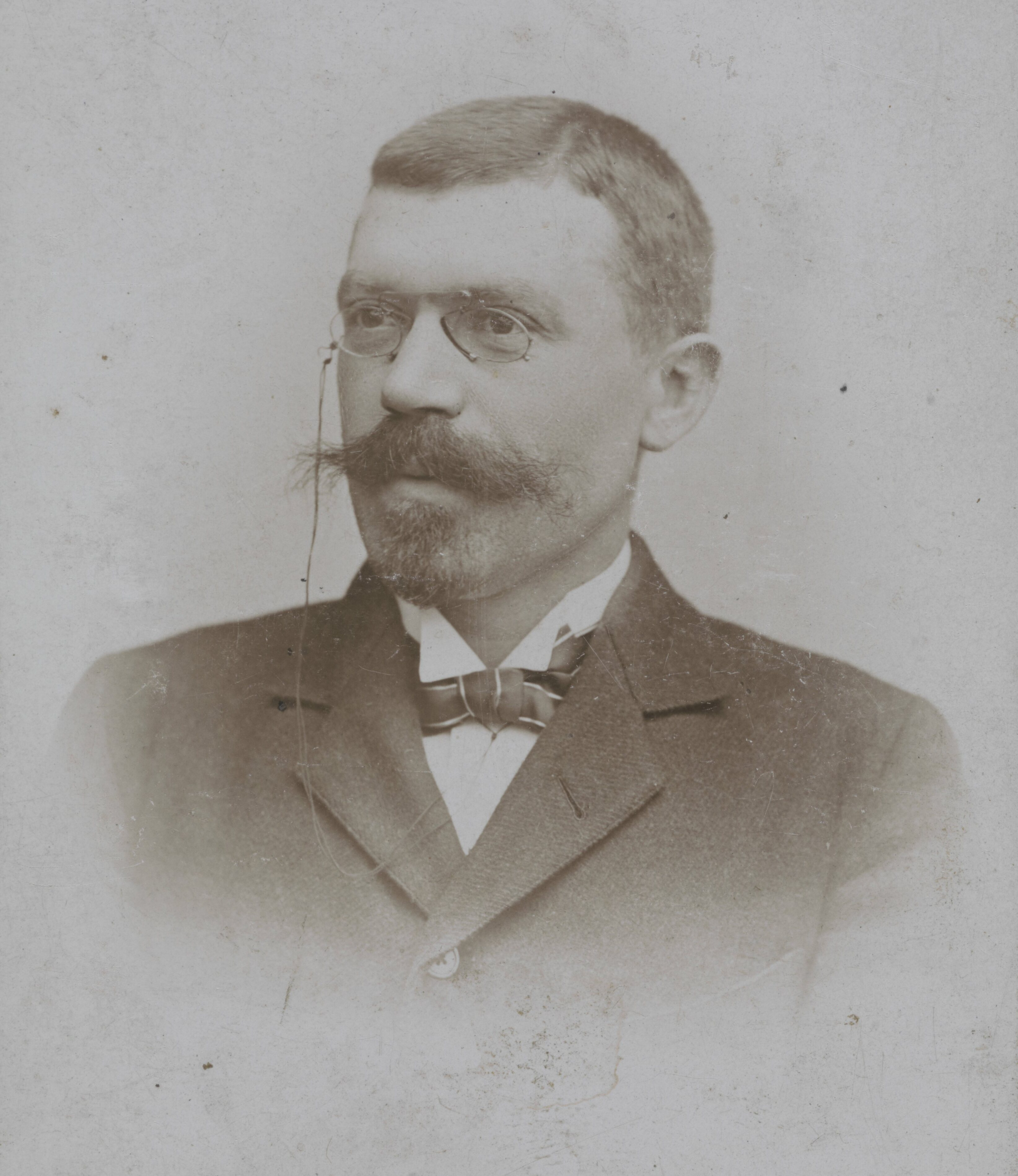
Edmund Biernacki

Edmund Faustyn Biernacki (19 December 1866 in Opoczno – 29 December 1911 in Lwów) was a Polish physician.

Biernacki was the first one to note a relationship between the sedimentation rate of red blood cells in a human blood sample and the general condition of the organism. This method, known as the Biernacki Reaction, is used worldwide to assess erythrocyte sedimentation rate (ESR), which is one of the major blood tests.

== See also ==
- Pathology
- List of pathologists
