= Włodzimierz Sieradzki =

Polish physician

Włodzimierz Jan Sieradzki
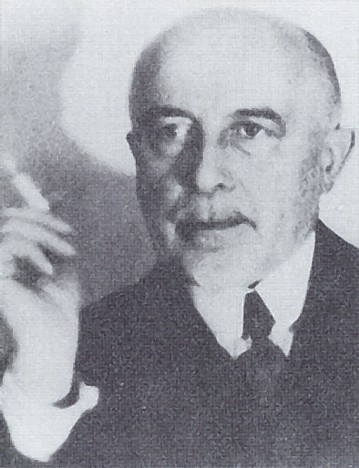
- Born: October 22, 1870; Wieliczka, Poland
- Died: July 4, 1941 (aged 70); Lviv, Ukraine
- Occupations: Physician, professor

Włodzimierz Jan Sieradzki (October 22, 1870, in Wieliczka – July 4, 1941, in Lviv) was a Polish physician, specializing in forensic medicine. He was a professor at Jan Kazimierz University and served as its rector during the academic year 1924–1925.

== Biography ==
Włodzimierz Sieradzki was born on October 22, 1870, in Wieliczka, to parents Apolinarego and Zofii z Boratyńskich. From 1881, he attended St. Anne's Gymnasium in Krakow, later in Rzeszow, but completed his final years of high school at the gymnasium in Jaslo, where he graduated in 1888. He began his medical studies in 1888 at the Medical Faculty of Jagiellonian University, where he received the golden scholarship of Emperor Francis Joseph and Empress Elizabeth. On July 11, 1894, he obtained a doctorate in medical sciences. From November 10, 1895, to July 10, 1896, he pursued supplementary studies in forensic medicine and toxicology in Paris, thanks to the Kasperk scholarship under a resolution of the Academic Senate of Jagiellonian University.

On July 15, 1896, he was appointed a forensic expert for the Krakow district by the Regional Court in Krakow. On October 1, 1898, he was entrusted with the organization of the Department of Forensic Medicine at the University of Lviv and its management. He served as the head of the department continuously for 42 years until 1941. In 1899, he obtained the title of associate professor of forensic medicine. From 1904, he was a full professor and head of the Department of Forensic Medicine at Jan Kazimierz University. He served as dean of the Faculty of Medicine several times (1908–1909, 1919–1920) and rector of Jan Kazimierz University during the academic year 1924–1925. He was a member of the Supreme Health Council and the Health Council of the Lviv Region, president (later honorary member) of the Lviv Medical Society, honorary member of the Vilnius Medical Society, co-founder of the Polish Society of Forensic and Criminal Medicine, and a member of the board of the People's School Society and the Polish Gymnastic Society "Sokół".

He authored numerous publications on forensic medicine. In his research, he focused on the influence of carbon monoxide on various blood pigments such as hemoglobin, alkaline and acid hematin, acid and alkaline hematoporphyrin. Together with Leon Wachholz, he developed a new method for determining carbon monoxide hemoglobin – the "Wachholz-Sieradzki test", which became part of forensic literature worldwide. At his initiative, a laboratory for chemical-toxicological research was established at the Department of Forensic Medicine at the University of Lviv in 1927.

He perished in the Massacre of Lwów professors, murdered by the Germans on the night of July 4, 1941.

== Orders and decorations ==
- Commander's Cross of the Order of Polonia Restituta (November 10, 1938)
- Haller Swords (before 1926)
- Knight of the Legion of Honour (France)

== Family ==
Since 1898, he was married to Karolina (Lina) née Zaremba (1878–1955), with whom he had a son Jerzy, who died defending Lviv, and a daughter Aleksandra (1900–1978), the wife of Polish Army Captain Kazimierz Nieżychowski. He was the grandfather of actor and journalist Jacek Nieżychowski.
