= Henryk Kadyi =

Polish comparative anatomist and histologist

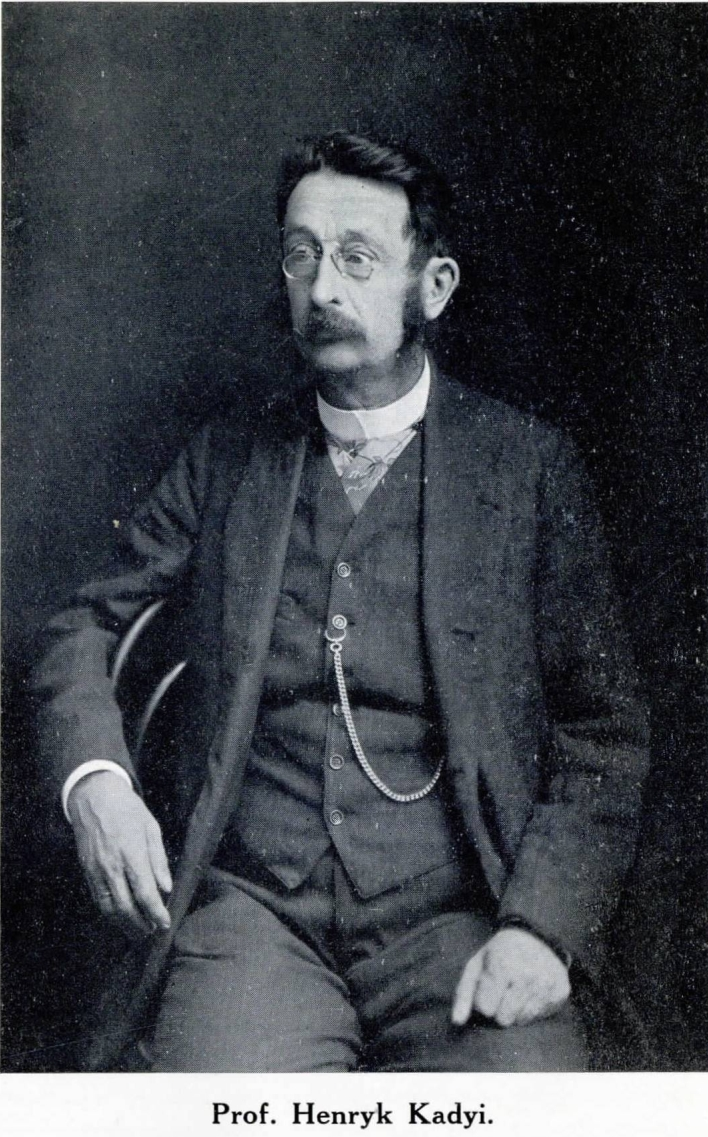
Henryk Kadyi

Henryk Karol Klemens Kadyi (23 May 1851 – 25 October 1912) was a Polish comparative anatomist and histologist from the Austro-Hungarian Empire. He made significant contributions to the study of the thyroid gland and the vascular system of the spinal cord. Kadyi was also notable for pioneering the use of heavy metal salts, such as uranyl acetate, for staining nerve and brain tissues.

== Biography ==
Kadyi was born in Przemyśl into an intellectual family. His father, Ludwik Kadyi, was a clerk, and his mother was Klementyna. His brother Józef became a physician, while another brother, Juliusz, served as a court counselor (Hofrat). Kadyi attended the Lviv Gymnasium before beginning medical studies in 1870 at the Jagiellonian University. He later transferred to the University of Vienna, where he graduated in 1875.

From 1873 to 1875, he served as an anatomy demonstrator at the Josephinum under Karl Langer. His early research focused on the venous system of the arm. He also trained in ophthalmology under Carl Ferdinand Ritter von Arlt and in surgery under Theodor Billroth. Returning to Kraków, he worked under Ludwik Karol Teichmann.

In 1878, Kadyi became a professor after defending his dissertation on the comparative anatomy of the mole’s eye. He was widely recognized for his skill in anatomical specimen preparation, which earned him scholarships to study in Austria and Germany. His studies included work with Carl Friedrich Wilhelm Claus in Vienna, Carl Toldt in Prague, and both Rudolf Leuckart and Wilhelm His Sr. in Leipzig. Although he was unable to attend embryology lectures by Oscar Hertwig and Richard Hertwig, then in Italy, he attended lectures on invertebrates by Carl Chun and vertebrates by Hermann von Ihering.

Kadyi returned to Kraków and later moved to Lviv, where from 1881 to 1890 he helped establish anatomical and histological studies. He played a foundational role in developing veterinary science as an academic discipline, publishing reform proposals in both Polish and German. From 1894 until his death in 1912, he served as professor of descriptive and topographical anatomy at the University of Lviv, where he was elected Rector Magnificus for the academic year 1898–99.

He was also known for supporting the inclusion of women in medical education, collaborating with Adolf Abraham Beck to make this possible. Renowned for his anatomical expertise, he was frequently asked to assist in the embalming of prominent figures, including Polish nobleman Włodzimierz Ksawery Tadeusz Dzieduszycki. Kadyi died in 1912 from an infection contracted while embalming the body of Count Stanisław Badeni. He was succeeded in his university post by Józef Markowski.

Kadyi developed innovative histological staining techniques, including the use of uranyl acetate to stain nerve cells and gray matter. He also organized the 10th Congress of Polish medical doctors.

Kadyi was married to Rozalia, and they had one daughter, Jadwiga, who died in 1917.
