= Scientific Library of Danylo Halytsky Lviv National Medical University =

- Наукова бібліотека Львівського національного медичного університету ім. Данила Галицького
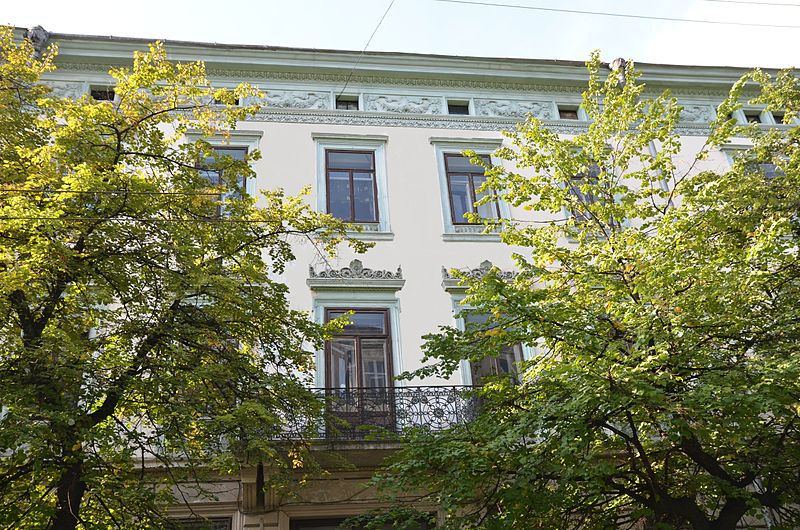
- The Scientific Library of Danylo Halytsky Lviv National Medical University
- 49.84096512841444°N 24.025137963654515°E
- Location: Lviv Oblast, Ukraine
- Type: Scientific library

Other information
- Affiliation: Danylo Halytsky Lviv National Medical University
- Website: http://medlib.lviv.pro/

The Scientific Library of Danylo Halytsky Lviv National Medical University (Ukrainian: Наукова бібліотека Львівського національного медичного університету імені Данила Галицького; transliterated Naukova biblioteka Lʹvivsʹkoho natsionalʹnoho medychnoho universytetu imeni Danyla Halytsʹkoho) is a department of the Danylo Halytsky Lviv National Medical University that provides students with printed materials for education and research work.

== History ==
On 1 December 1939, 27,000 volumes of medical literature were transferred from the library of the Lviv University to the library of Lviv State Medical University, a precursor to the Danylo Halytsky Lviv National Medical University. These items, which were written mainly in Polish, German, English, and French, became the foundational materials of the medical library.

The first library building was located on the street Charnetskoho 30 (formerly Radianska; currently Vynnychenko Street).

The German occupation of Lviv, beginning on 30 June 1941, stopped university activities until 20 May 1942. The spacious library building, which at that time was located on the Radianska Street 30, was repurposed as a hospital for infectious diseases, and the Scientific Library of LSMU was eliminated. During World War II, parts of the library collection were looted, burned, and destroyed. However, thanks to the efforts of LSMU librarians, almost 20,000 volumes were saved and transferred back to the library of Ivan Franko National University of Lviv for safekeeping. Library equipment was only preserved in small quantities; part of it was looted during the war, some of it went to the hospital for infectious diseases, and still other equipment was sent to different libraries across the city, due to the elimination of funding for those institutions.

During the Second World War, the Scientific Library of the Lviv State Medical University, along with other libraries of higher educational institutions of the city, were part of the single administrative system, known as the "National Library" (Staatsbibliothek Lemberg).

On 19 February 1940, according to Decree No. 196 of the Council of People's Commissars of the USSR, the library was recognized as scientific and was given a building on May 3 Street, 6 (formerly 17 of September; currently Sichovykh Striltsiv Street).

The subsequent history of the library is closely connected with Stanislav Henry Badeni, a lawyer and patron, in whose house the current library is situated. The house, which belonged to the Count family, was built in 1860 by the architect E. Kohlera. The house was located in a downtown area of Lviv, and the building was decorated in the style of neo-rococo. By 1941, the library had grown to 35,000 volumes.

On August 20, 1941, after only one month of German occupation, the general reading room of the library opened its doors. Due to the poor upkeep of the library and the looting which had occurred at it, most medical books, mostly literature published before 1939 in Polish, German, French, and English, remained in storage at the library of Ivan Franko National University of Lviv and were not available for public use. The only collection of medical books at Scientific Library of LSMU, at the time, numbered 639 volumes of the most valuable and most used books, including foreign language "Lestorium"; these were transported to the Scientific Library at Lviv University, and became the improvised basis of the general reading room of the library. Following the German occupation, the scientific libraries of LSMU and Lviv University replenished themselves with up-to-date medical books.

Between 1944 and 1945, the Scientific Library at LSMU received 18 medical journals, 7 scientific journals, 4 political journals, and also 23 newspapers in Ukrainian, Polish, and Russian.

Following the occupation, the Scientific Library maintained a close relationship with the Republic Medical Library and the Kharkiv State Medical Library, which contributed to the enriching of its funds. For example, the Kharkiv State Medical Library donated 4,281 volumes of medical and political books, as well as various periodicals to the Scientific Library. AT this time, the Scientific Library itself donated 178 volumes of Polish medical literature to the newly founded Medical University of Lublin.

Between 1944 and 1945, 11,258 visitors benefited from the general reading room services, and library circulation totaled 15,503 books. 4,068 visitors also benefited from the periodicals reading room, with circulation totaling 3,407 items. 7,125 readers also benefited from the loan department services, with 9,936 books checked out. The library is used by faculty, students, and other members of the medical school, as well as doctors and medical professionals from the area. The library has started to use a system of double catalogs, with both alphabetical and systematic catalogs that can be used by both readers and workers.

Following the occupation, some of the other departments of LSMU had their own libraries, providing the faculties of the respectively departments with services. With the occupation over, each library was able to receive more scientific literature and specialized magazines. In 1945, there were 20 departmental libraries, each containing approximately 1,000 volumes. According to the order of the Director of the Scientific Library, Nestor Romanovych Rudnytskyy, the head of each department was appointed to be the head of their department's library. In 1951, the Scientific Library was one of the largest libraries in Lviv with its collection totaling 91,144 items.

In 1952, an interlibrary loan system was established.

In 2001, the Scientific Library of the Medical University achieved the status where it is no longer taxed at the international book exchange.

Since the beginning of its activity until the present, the library managers were skilled professionals with high levels of educational and practical experience. Among them were Vitaliy Levitskyy (1939–1940), Pauline Efymivna Sushko (1940), Ioannina Frantsyshkivna Berger (1940–1941), Nestor R. Rudnytskyy (1941–1952), Abraham Hdalyevych Birman (1952–1961), Iryna Dmytrivna Ivanova (1961–1985), Natalia Mykolaivna Kurnat (1985–2011), and Martha S. Nadraga (2011–2015).

== Collection ==
Since the library's founding the charitable support of numerous donors has contributed to the formation and replenishment of the collection. An important contribution have been made by Professors A. Yurash, H. Kadyy, Professor. L. Rydyher, B. Syeradzki, F. Shteher von Sebenitts, B. Zyembitski, A. Mars, R.C. Weigl, G. Dobzhanska, E. Kamyenski, V. Vladzimirski, V. Seidl, D. Kowalski, A. Dornfest, G. Halleho, J. Hausberh, and many others.

The following medical institutions and societies have also transferred their own private libraries to the Scientific Library: Seminarjum Historji i Filozofii Medycyny U. J. K. we Lwowie, Towarzystwo aptekarskie we Lwowie, Zaklad Historji Medycyny U.J.K. we Lwowie, Biblioteka Kliniki dziecięcej we Lwowie, Zaklad farmakologji Uniwersytetu Jana Kazimierza we Lwowie, Akademia Towarzystwa Medikὸw Ẑydowskich we Lwowie, C.K. Krajowy referent spraw zdrowia, Biblioteka Zygmunta Leszczynskiego we Lwowie, Muzeum Historyi Medycyny w Uniwersytecie Jagiellońskim, and Towarzystwo Lekarzy Galicyjskich.

At last count, the Scientific Library has 582,297 books.

=== Notable and rare books ===
The most important and rare books in the library:

- Octavvs Tomvs In Qvo Insvnt Libri Galeno Ascripti: Artis Totivs Farrago Varia. : eorum catalogum uerfa pagina oftendet. — Basileae, 1549.
- Dispensatorium pharmaceuticum Austriaco-Viennese, in quo hodierna die usualiora medicamenta secundum artis regulas componenda visuntur. Cum Sacræ Cæfareæ Regiæque Catholicæ Majeftatis privilegio. Sumptibus Collegii Pharmaceutici Viennensis. — 1729.
- Pharmacopoeia augustana renovata, revisa et appendice aliquot medicamentorum selectiorum aucta. — 1734.
- Theden, Johann Christian Anton. Neue Bemerkungen und Erfahrungen zur Bereicherung der Wundarzneykunst und Arzneygelahrheit : Zweiter Theil. — Berlin, 1782.
- Barth, Joseph. Anfangsgründe der Muskellehre. — Wien, 1786.
- Vogel, Samuel Gottlieb. Handbuch der praktischen Arzneywissenschaft Zum Gebrauche für angehende Aerzte : Dritter Theil. – 1791.
- Metzger, Johann Daniel. Kurzgefaßtes System der gerichtlichen Arzneywissenschaft. — Wien, 1811.
- Gąsiorowski, Ludwik. Zbiór wiadomości do historyi sztuki lekarskiej w Polsce od czasów najdawniejszych, aż do najnowszych. Т. 1. – Poznań, 1839.

== Scientific research ==
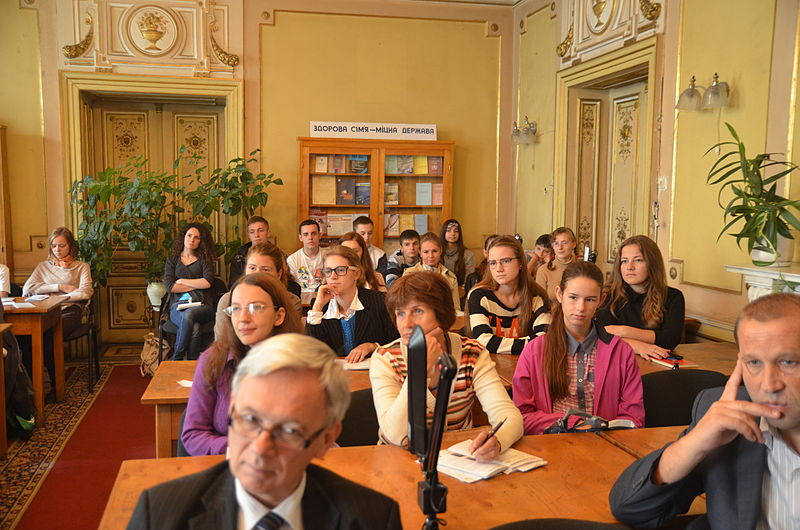
Reading room of the Scientific library of Danylo Halytsky Lviv National Medical University

In 2007, the Scientific Library was the venue of a conference titled "Medical Libraries of Ukraine on the way to the Knowledge Society", which was organized by the Ministry of Healthcare of Ukraine, the National Scientific Medical Library, and the Ukrainian Library Association. The conference discussed the current state of medical libraries in Ukraine, development trends towards the formation of a knowledge society, ways to provide integrated technology in medicine and pharmacy, and the prospects of forming a multifunctional, medical, electronic library.

In 2012, as part of an agreement between Danylo Halytskyi LNMU and the Austrian Academy of Sciences, the universities jointly conducted bibliographic research and eight articles about famous Ukrainian, Austrian, and Polish scientists were published in the Austrian Biographical Lexicon, or the "Österreichisches Biographisches Lexikon 1815–1950", a scientific publication of the Austrian Academy of Sciences.

== Departments ==
An important department of the library is that of educational literature, which was established in 1971, and for students' convenience is situated in the theoretical building of the university on Schimseriv 3 Street (formerly Side Pekarska). With its two reading rooms and two loan departments, the department aims to provide the students of the university with quality textbooks and teaching materials. In September 2002, the loan department of English literature was established. In 2007, the reading room for foreign students started its work, and the library has also expanded its capabilities by providing Internet access.

== Cooperation ==
The library is always looking for partnerships that would contribute to its collection and the lives of its students and employees. The library has also formed partnerships that help to solve its pressing issues and develop its future goals. The Scientific Library is a member of the Ukrainian Library Association, Arbeitsgemeinschaft für Medizinisches Bibliothekswesen, Arbeitsgemeinschaft der Bibliotheken und Dokumentationsstellen der Ost-, Ostmittel-und Südosteuropaforschung (ABDOS), and partner of the Lviv Book Forum, an NGO.

== See also ==
- List of libraries in Ukraine
