= Antoni Jurasz =

Polish laryngologist (1847–1923)

Antoni Stanisław Jurasz
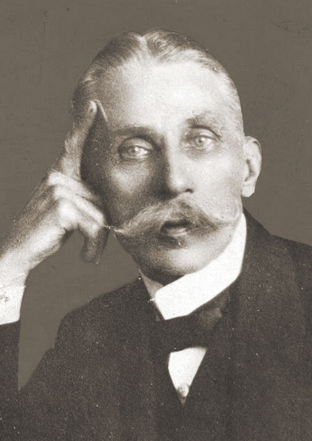
- Image of Antoni Stanisław Jurasz taken before 1923
- Born: 24 November 1847; Poznań
- Died: 12 August 1923 (aged 75); Poznań
- Resting place: Poznań
- Citizenship: German Empire (Polish)
- Education: University of Greifswald and University of Würzburg
- Occupation: Laryngologist
- Employer(s): Lviv University and University of Würzburg
- Children: Antoni Tomasz Jurasz

Antoni Stanisław Jurasz (24 November 1847 – 12 August 1923) was a Polish laryngologist who was a native of Spławie (Posen). He spent most of his life living and working in what was then the German Empire. He was the father of surgeon Antoni Tomasz Jurasz (1882–1961).

He studied medicine at the universities of Greifswald and Würzburg, and in 1872 became a clinical assistant at Heidelberg. Here, he worked with pediatric illnesses, and diseases of the pharynx, nose and throat. In 1881 Jurasz was appointed associate professor at the university.

In 1908 he relocated as a full professor to the University of Lviv, where he was also director of the otolaryngology clinic. In 1920 he moved to the recently founded University of Poznań.

Jurasz is remembered for his pioneer work in rhinoscopy, and is credited with the construction and modification of a number of medical instruments used in the field of rhinolaryngology, including a specialized tool known as a nasopharynx forceps.

== Selected publications ==
- Das systolische Hirngeräusch der Kinder, 1877.
- Über die Sensibilitätsneurosen des Rachens und des Kehlkopfes ("On nerve sensitivity of the pharynx and larynx").
- Über die Sondirung der Stirnbeinhöhle, 1887.
- Die Krankheiten der oberen Luftwege ("Diseases of the upper airways").
- Handbuch der Laryngologie und Rhinologie ("Textbook of laryngology and rhinology"), 1898.
