= Jakub Karol Parnas =

Polish-Soviet biochemist (1884–1949)

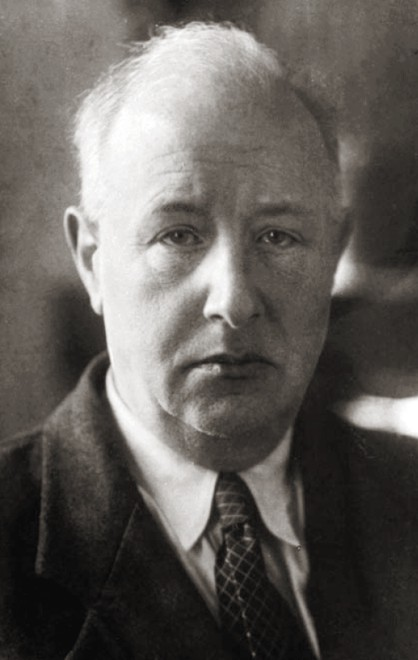
- Born: January 16, 1884; Tarnopol, Austria-Hungary
- Died: January 29, 1949 (aged 65); Moscow, Soviet Union
- Education: Königlich Technische Hochschule Charlottenburg; ETH Zurich
- Known for: Embden–Meyerhof–Parnas pathway
- Scientific career
- Doctoral advisor: Richard Willstätter

Jakub Karol Parnas, also known as Yakov Oskarovich Parnas (Russian: Яков Оскарович Парнас; January 16, 1884 – January 29, 1949) was a prominent Polish–Soviet biochemist who contributed to the discovery of the Embden–Meyerhof–Parnas pathway, together with Otto Fritz Meyerhof and Gustav Embden. He became a Soviet activist after the annexation of Western Ukraine in 1939. He was arrested during the Jewish Anti-Fascist Committee affair in 1949 and died in the prison, reportedly of heart attack.

== Biography ==
Parnas was born in 1884 in Tarnopol, at that time part of Austria-Hungary, in the province of Galicia (now split between Poland and Ukraine), to Jewish parents. He graduated from the Königlich Technische Hochschule Charlottenburg in 1904. From 1920 to 1941, he was head of the Institute of the Medical Chemistry at Lviv University. He traveled across Europe, collaborating with universities in Cambridge, Naples, Strasbourg, Ghent and Zürich. He was a member of the German Academy of Sciences Leopoldina, Corresponding Member of the Polish Academy of Sciences, as well an honorary doctor of Sorbonne University and the University of Athens.

After the Soviet invasion of Poland and annexation of Western Ukraine in 1939 by the Soviet Union, Parnas remained in Lviv to continue his work in the institute. He also started collaborating with the Soviet authorities by taking on a political role in the communist District Soviet Worker's Delegation. In 1941, after the German invasion of the Soviet Union, Parnas was evacuated deeper into the USSR and remained there for the rest of his life. Only a few days after his departure, Lviv (Lwów) was occupied by the Nazi Germany army, who massacred approximately 45 Lwów professors. Parnas was a member of the Union of Polish Patriots.

In the Soviet Union, Parnas met Joseph Stalin, and received his own laboratory. He became an Academician of the Academy of Sciences of the Soviet Union and a founding member of the USSR Academy of Medical Sciences.

Despite his achievements and popularity, Parnas was falsely accused of being a spy of the West and arrested by the KGB on January 28, 1949. According to KGB's archives, he died during his first interrogation at Lubyanka prison "from a heart attack" on January 29, 1949.

== Achievements ==
Parnas's major work was the study of the mechanisms of carbohydrate metabolism in muscle tissue. Together with Władysław Baranowski, he discovered the process of phosphorolysis. Parnas also made a major contribution to the theoretical analysis of glycolysis. He is the author of about 180 scientific works in German, Polish, English, French, Russian, Ukrainian.

== Legacy ==
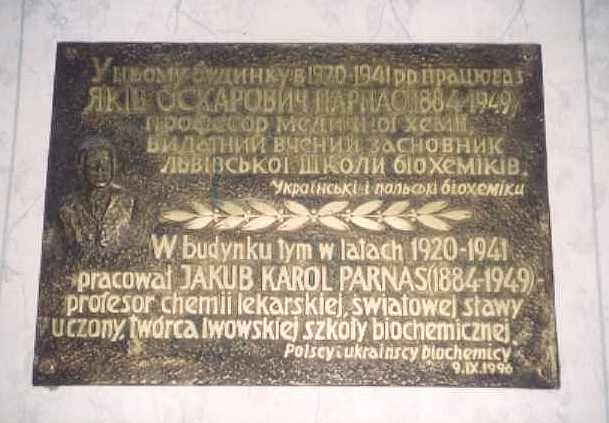
Jakub Parnas memorial

Parnas is honored by the Polish–Ukrainian Parnas Conference organized by the Polish and Ukrainian Biochemical Societies, which has been held every two years since 1996.

In 2009, Prof. Andrzej Dżugaj, the President of the Polish Biochemical Society, suggested to include Israeli biochemists to the Conference organizers to acknowledge the roots of J.K. Parnas and his co-workers. Thanks to his efforts, the VIII Parnas Conference took place in 2011, in Poland, for the first time, with the joint organization by three national Societies, Polish, Ukrainian and Israel. In 2013 the conference took place in Jerusalem (organized by Israeli Society for Biochemistry and Molecular Biology). The next Parnas conference took place in Poland at 10–12 July 2016, (Wrocław University).
