= Leon Wachholz =

Polish scientist and medical examiner

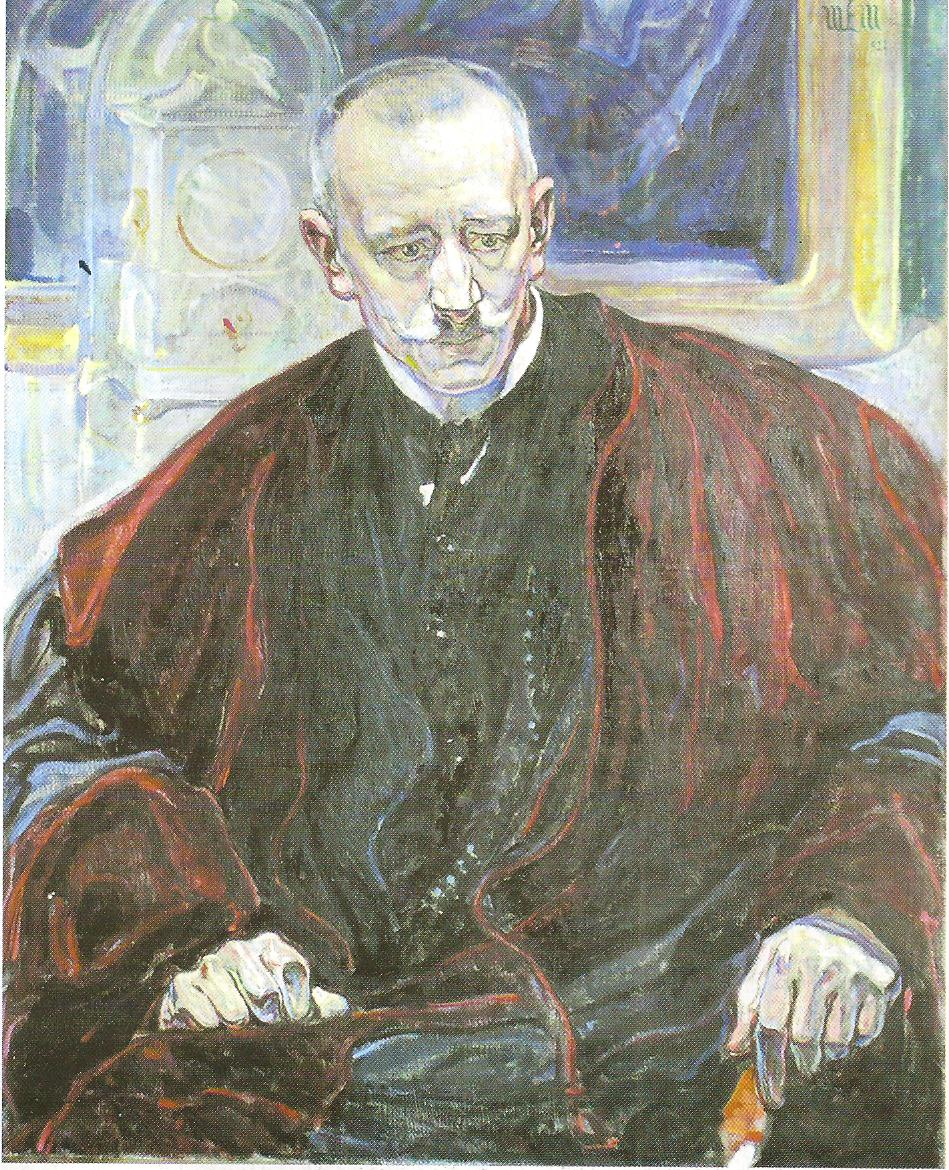
- Portrait of Leon Wachholz by the painter Leon Wyczółkowski
- Born: June 20, 1867; Kraków, Congress Poland
- Died: December 1, 1942 (aged 75); Kraków, General Government
- Education: Jagiellonian University
- Spouse: Józefa Sariusz Jelita – Małecka
- Children: Wilhelm Szczęsny Wachholz
- Scientific career
- Fields: Forensic medicine Social medicine
- Notable students: Włodzimierz Sieradzki; Stefan Horoszkiewicz; Wiktor Grzywo-Dąbrowski

Leon Jan Wachholz (Wacholz) (June 20, 1867 – December 1, 1942) was a Polish scientist and medical examiner. He researched and taught as a professor of forensic and social medicine at the Jagiellonian University between 1896 and 1933 and published formative works on forensics.

He is considered to be one of the most important representatives of forensic medicine in Poland in the 20th century and creator of the modern Polish forensic medical school. He authored over 200 papers in forensic medicine and medical history both in German and Polish.

== Life ==
Wachholz was born June 20, 1867 in Kraków to Antoni Wachholz (1814–1873), who was a professor of universal history at Jagiellonian University, and Joanna née Zagórska.

He studied at Jagiellonian University, which he graduated with a doctorate in medical sciences in 1890. Then he completed supplementary studies at universities in Copenhagen, Berlin, Paris and Vienna.

After returning to Kraków, in 1894, he received his postdoctoral degree in forensic medicine at the Faculty of Medicine of the Jagiellonian University, and then in the years 1894–1895 he was the head of the Department of Forensic Medicine. In 1895, he was appointed head of the Department of Judiciary and Medicine at the Jagiellonian University, which he held until 1923. He was appointed associate professor in 1896, and full professor in 1898. In the academic year 1901/1902 he was the dean of The Faculty of Medicine of the Jagiellonian University, and in 1908/1909 the dean of the Faculty of Law of the Jagiellonian University. In 1930, he became a member of the Polish Academy of Arts and Sciences. In 1934 he was appointed honorary professor of the Faculty of Medicine of the Jagiellonian University.

His students included Włodzimierz Sieradzki, Stefan Horoszkiewicz, and Wiktor Grzywo-Dąbrowski.

=== Imprisonment and death ===
On November 6, 1939, he was arrested by the Germans. After three weeks in prisons in Kraków and Wrocław, he ended up in the Sachsenhausen concentration camp. His stay in the camp had a bad effect on his health, and he was placed in the camp hospital. He was released from the camp on February 8, 1940, and returned to Kraków seriously ill. He never recovered and died there December 1, 1942.

=== Personal life ===
He was married to Józefa Sariusz Jelita – Małecka.

Wilhelm Szczęsny Wachholz (1897–1957), professor for administrative law at Jagiellonian University, was his son.
