= Odo Bujwid =

Polish bacteriologist (1857–1942)

Odo Feliks Kazimierz Bujwid
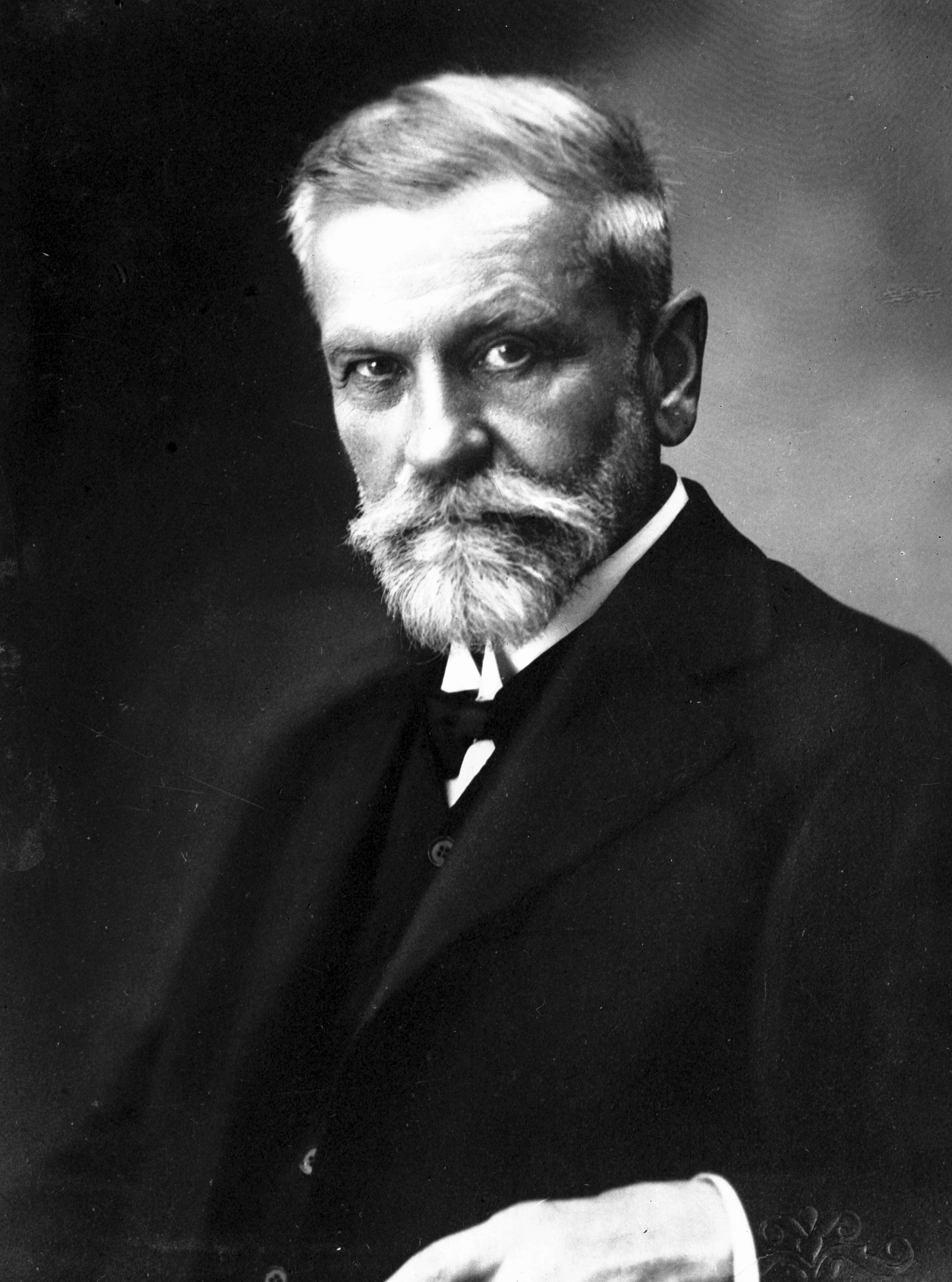
- Born: 30 November 1857; Vilnius, Lithuania-Vilnius Governorate, Russian Empire
- Died: 26 December 1942 (aged 85); Kraków, Nazi-occupied Poland

Odo Feliks Kazimierz Bujwid (30 November 1857 in Vilnius – 26 December 1942 in Kraków) (sometimes referred to as Odon Bujwid) was a Polish bacteriologist, recognized as the founder of bacteriology in Poland.
