= List of universities in Ukraine =

The following is a list of universities in Ukraine organized by region (oblast, autonomous republic, or city with special status). Higher education in Ukraine is regulated by the Ministry of Education and Science of Ukraine.

== Universities by region ==
=== Autonomous Republic of Crimea and Sevastopol ===
The following universities are in Crimea. Autonomous Republic of Crimea was illegally occupied by the Russian Federation in 2014 as part of the ongoing Russo-Ukrainian War. These Universities are either under occupational control or are closed.

==== Sevastopol ====
- Sevastopol National Technical University

==== Simferopol ====
- Crimean University of Culture, Arts and Tourism
- Medical Academy Named after S.I. Georgievsky of V.I. Vernadsky (aka Crimea State Medical University)
- Tavrida National V.I. Vernadsky University (TNU, currently operating in Kyiv)

==== Dzhankoi ====
Dzhankoi National University

=== Cherkasy Oblast ===
The following universities are located in the Cherkasy Oblast.

==== Cherkasy ====
- Cherkasy National University
- Cherkasy State Business College
- Cherkasy State Technological University
- East European University of Economics and Management
- Rauf Ablyazov East European University

==== Uman ====
- Pavlo Tychyna Uman State Pedagogical University
- Uman National University of Horticulture

=== Chernihiv Oblast ===
The following universities are located in the Chernihiv Oblast.

==== Chernihiv ====
- T.G.Shevchenko 'Chernihiv Collegium' National University (Note: Національний університет «Чернігівський колегіум» імені Т. Г. Шевченка)
- Chernihiv Polytechnic National University

==== Nizhyn ====
Nizhyn Gogol State University

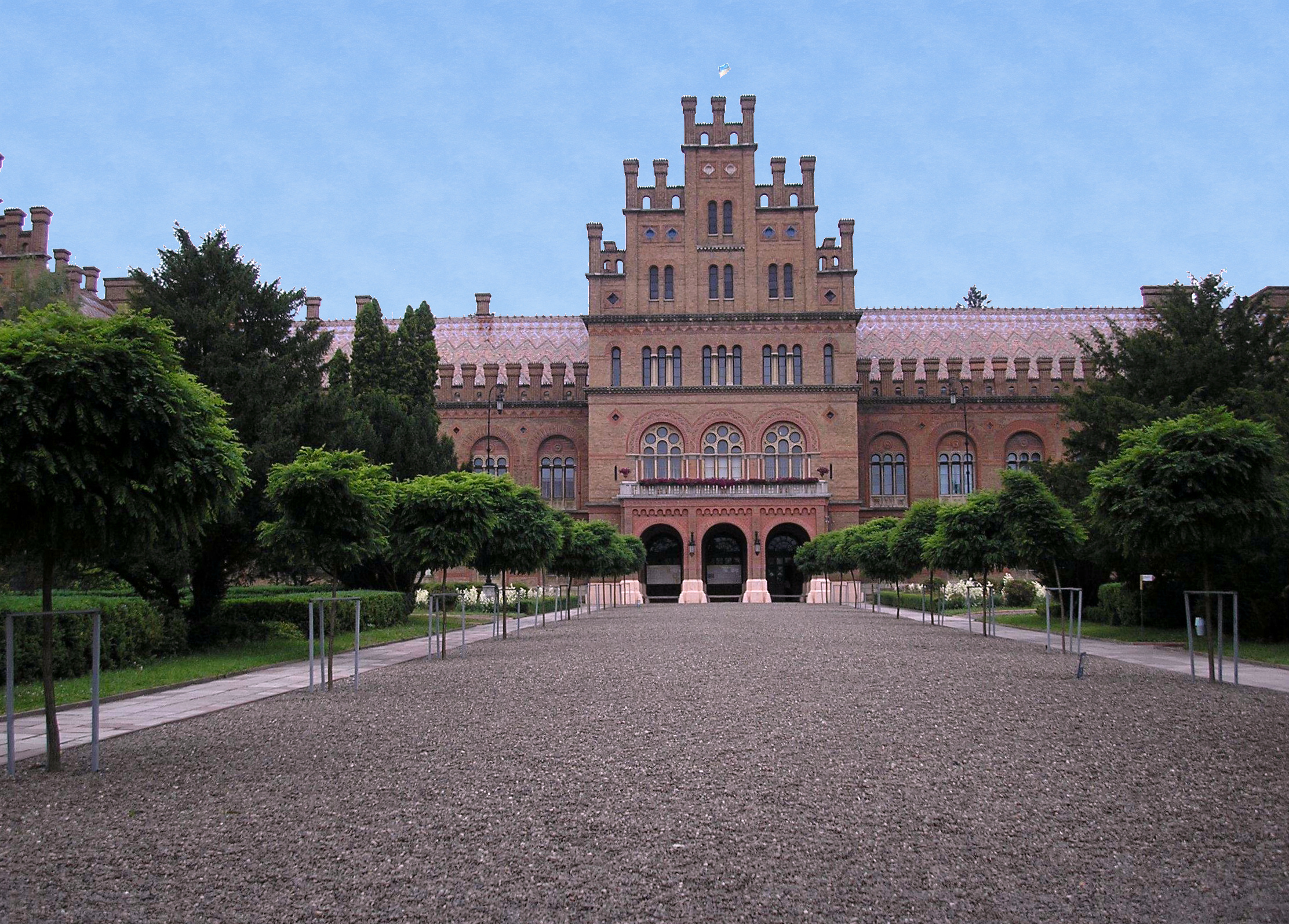
Chernivtsi University

=== Chernivtsi Oblast ===
The following universities are located in the Chernivtsi Oblast.

==== Chernivtsi ====
- Chernivtsi University
- Bukovinian State Medical University

=== Dnipropetrovsk Oblast ===
The following colleges and universities are in the Dnipropetrovsk Oblast.

==== Dnipro ====
- Alfred Nobel University
- Dnipro Academy of Continuing Education
- Dnipro Institute of Medicine and Public Health
- Dnipro Medical Institute of Conventional and Alternative Medicine
- Dnipro Polytechnic
- Dnipro State Agrarian and Economic University
- Dnipro State Medical University
- Dnipro State University of Internal Affairs
- International Humanitarian and Pedagogical Institute “Beit-Hana”
- Interregional Academy of Personnel Management
- Oles Honchar Dnipro National University
- Ukrainian State University of Science and Technologies
  - Dnipro Institute of Infrastructure and Transport (DIIT)
  - Dnipro State Academy of Physical Culture and Sports
  - National Metallurgical Academy of Ukraine
  - Prydniprovska State Academy of Civil Engineering and Architecture
  - Ukrainian State University of Chemical Technology
- University of Customs and Finance

==== Kamianske ====
Dniprovskyi State Technical University

==== Kryvyi Rih ====
- Donetsk National University of Economics and Trade named after Mykhailo Tugan-Baranovsky (DonNUET)
- Kryvyi Rih National University (KNU)
- Kryvyi Rih Professional College of National Aviation University
- Kryvyi Rih State Pedagogical University
- State University of Economics and Technology

=== Donetsk Oblast ===
The following universities are located in the Donetsk Oblast.

==== Donetsk ====
- Donetsk National Technical University
- Donetsk State University of Management

==== Mariupol ====
- Mariupol State University
- Pryazovskyi State Technical University

==== Sloviansk ====
Donbas State Pedagogical University

==== Kramatorsk ====
Donbas National Academy of Civil Engineering and Architecture (DonNABA)

==== Lysychansk ====
Donbas State Technical University

=== Ivano-Frankivsk Oblast ===
The following colleges and universities are in the Ivano-Frankivsk Oblast.

==== Ivano-Frankivsk ====
- Ivano-Frankivsk National Medical University
- Ivano-Frankivsk National Technical University of Oil and Gas
- Ivano-Frankivsk Professional College
- Ivano-Frankivsk Vocational College of Technology and Business
- King Danylo University
- Vasyl Stefanyk Precarpathian National University

=== Kharkiv Oblast ===
The following colleges and universities are located in the Kharkiv Oblast.

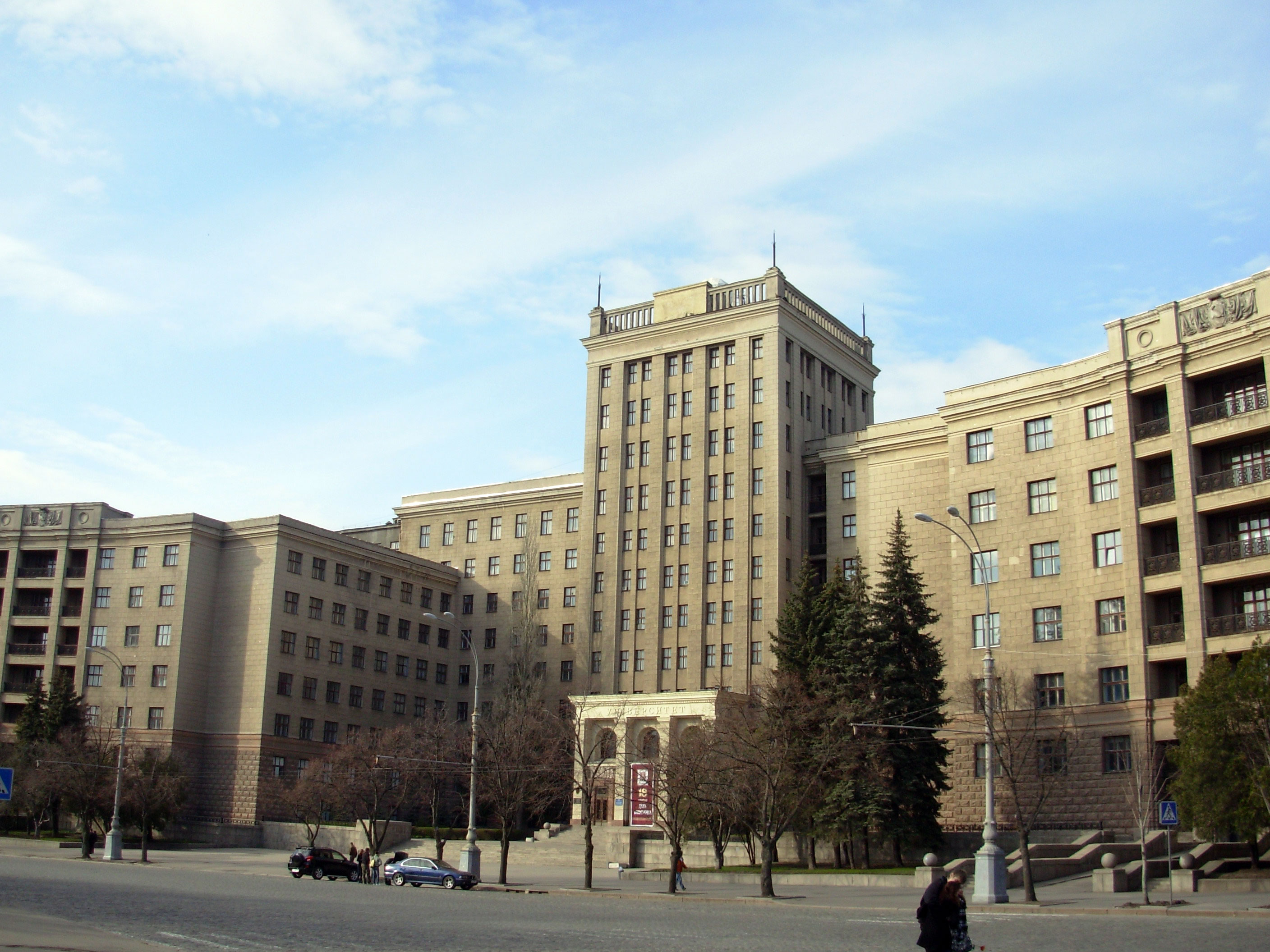
V. N. Karazin Kharkiv National University

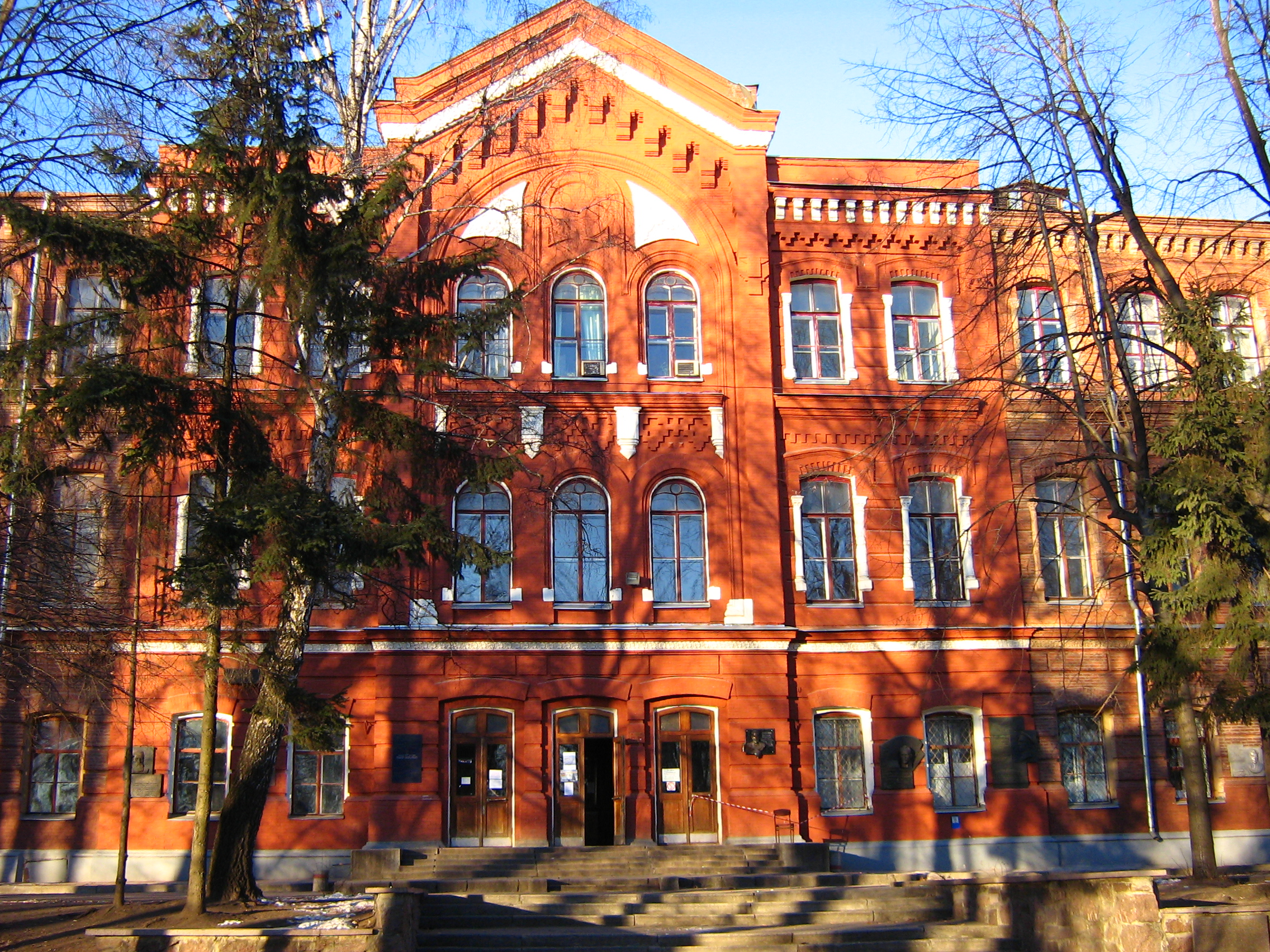
Kharkiv Polytechnical Institute

==== Kharkiv ====
- H.S. Skovoroda Kharkiv National Pedagogical University
- Interregional Academy of Personnel Management
- Ivan Kozhedub National Air Force University
- Kharkiv College of Textiles and Design (I–II accreditation level only)
- Kharkiv I.P. Kotlyarevsky National University of Arts
- Kharkiv Institute of Trade and Economics
- Kharkiv International Medical University
- Kharkiv Medical Academy of Postgraduate Education
- Kharkiv National Academy of Urban Economy
- Kharkiv National Automobile and Highway University
- Kharkiv National Kotlyarevsky University of Arts
- Kharkiv National Medical University
- Kharkiv National University of Civil Engineering and Architecture
- Kharkiv National University of Economics
- Kharkiv National University of Internal Affairs
- Kharkiv National University of Radioelectronics
- Kharkiv Polytechnic Institute
- Kharkiv Regional Medical College
- Kharkiv State Academy of Culture
- Kharkiv State Academy of Design and Arts
- Kharkiv State Academy of Physical Culture
- Luhansk National Agrarian University
- National Aerospace University – Kharkiv Aviation Institute
- National Scientific Center Hon. Prof. M. S. Bokarius Forensic Science Institute
- National University of Civil Defense of Ukraine
- National University of Pharmacy
- O.M. Beketov National University of Urban Economy
- People's Ukrainian Academy
- SHEI Banking University
- Simon Kuznets Kharkiv National University of Economics
- Ukrainian State University of Railway Transport
- State University of Biotechnology (since 2021):
  - Kharkiv State University of Food Technology and Trade
  - V. Dokuchaev Kharkiv National Agrarian University
  - Kharkiv Petro Vasylenko National Technical University of Agriculture
  - Kharkiv State Zooveterinary Academy
- V. N. Karazin Kharkiv National University
  - Ukrainian Engineering Pedagogics Academy
- Yaroslav Mudryi National Law University

=== Kherson Oblast ===
The following colleges and universities are located in the Kherson Oblast.

==== Kherson ====
- International University of Business and Law
- Kherson National Technical University
- Kherson State Agro-Economic University
- Kherson State Maritime Academy
- Kherson State University

=== Khmelnytskyi Oblast ===
The following universities are located in the Khmelnytskyi Oblast.

==== Kamianets-Podilskyi ====
- Kamyanets-Podilsky Ivan Ohienko National University
- Podilsky State Agrarian Technical University

==== Khmelnytskyi ====
- Khmelnytskyi National University
- Khmelnytskyi University of Management and Law named after Leonid Yuzkov

=== Kirovohrad Oblast ===
The following universities are located in the Kirovohrad Oblast.

==== Kropyvnytskiy ====
- Central Ukrainian National Technical University
- Donetsk National Medical University
- Flight Academy of the National Aviation University
- Volodymyr Vynnychenko Central Ukrainian State University

==== Oleksandriia ====
Classic Private University

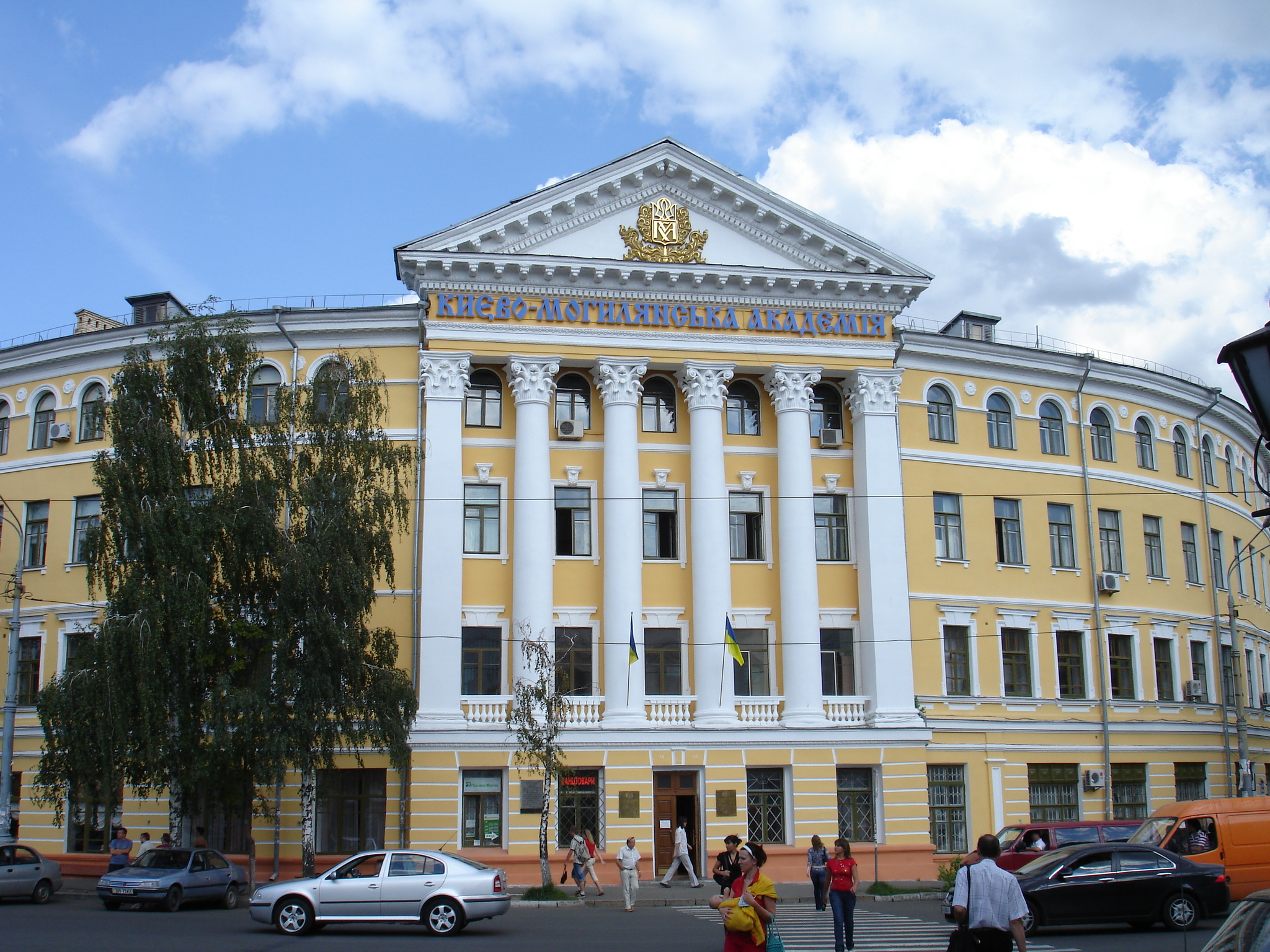
National University of Kyiv-Mohyla Academy in Kyiv

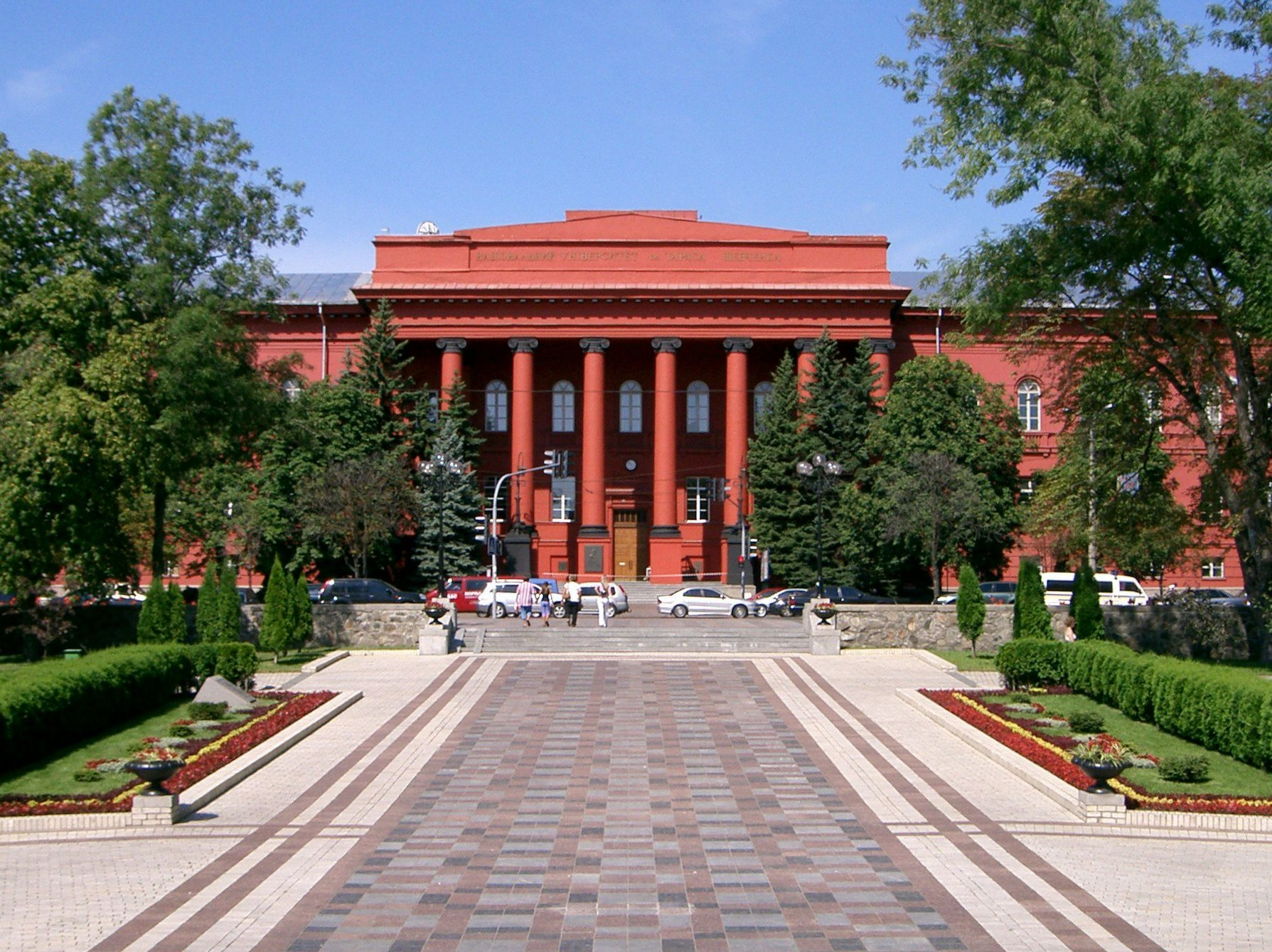
Taras Shevchenko National University of Kyiv

=== Kyiv Oblast and Kyiv ===
The following colleges and universities are in Kyiv or the Kyiv Oblast.

==== Bila Tserkva ====
Bila Tserkva National Agrarian University

==== Kyiv ====
- Academy of Advocacy of Ukraine
- Academy of Labour, Social Relations and Tourism
- American University Kyiv
- Banking University Institute of Banking Technologies and Business (Kyiv)
- Bogomolets National Medical University
- Borys Grinchenko Kyiv Metropolitan University
- Diplomatic Academy of Ukraine named after Hennadiy Udovenko
- European University
- Financial-Legal College
- Igor Sikorsky Kyiv Polytechnic Institute (KPI, a.k.a. National Technical University of Ukraine)
- Institute of Ecology of Economy and Law
- Institute of Neurosurgery named after Acad. A .P. Romodanov National Academy of Sciences of Ukraine
- International Academy of Ecology and Medicine
- International Christian University – Kyiv
- International European University
- International Institute of Business
- International Scientific and Technical University
- International Solomon University
- International University of Finances
- Interregional Academy of Personnel Management
- KROK University
- Kyiv Academy of Hairdressing Art
- Kyiv College of Communication
- Kyiv Institute of Business and Technology
- Kyiv International University
- Kyiv Medical University
- Kyiv Municipal Academy of Circus and Variety Arts
- Kyiv National I. K. Karpenko-Kary Theatre, Cinema and Television University
- Kyiv National Linguistic University
- Kyiv National University of Construction and Architecture
- Kyiv National University of Culture and Arts
- Kyiv National University of Technologies and Design
- Kyiv National University of Trade and Economics
- Kyiv School of Economics
- Kyiv Slavonic University
- Kyiv State Choreographic College
- Lviv State University of Internal Affairs
- Military Institute of Telecommunications and Information Technologies
- Mykhailo Boichuk Kyiv State Academy of Decorative Applied Arts and Design
- National Academy of Fine Art and Architecture
- National Academy of Internal Affairs
- National Academy of Management
- National Academy of Statistics, Accounting and Auditing
- National Academy of Visual Arts and Architecture
- National Aviation University
- National Defense University of Ukraine
- National Pedagogical Drahomanov University
- National Transport University
- National University of Food Technologies
- National University of Kyiv-Mohyla Academy
- National University of Life and Environmental Sciences of Ukraine
- National University of Ukraine on Physical Education and Sport
- Open International University of Human Development "Ukraine"
- Open University of Taras Shevchenko National University of Kyiv
- P. L. Shupyk National Healthcare University of Ukraine
- R.Glier Kyiv Institute of Music
- Salvador Dali Academy of Contemporary Arts
- State University of Information and Communication Technologies
- State University of Infrastructure and Technologies
- Taras Shevchenko National University of Kyiv (KNU)
- Taurida National V.I. Vernadsky University (TNU)
- University Education Management
- University of the State Fiscal Service of Ukraine
- Ukrainian-American Concordia University
- Ukrainian Institute of Arts and Sciences
- Ukrainian National Tchaikovsky Academy of Music
- Ukrainian State Employment Service Training Institute
- Vadym Hetman Kyiv National Economic University

==== Pereiaslav ====
Hryhorii Skovoroda University in Pereiaslav

=== Luhansk Oblast ===
The following universities are located in the Luhansk Oblast.

==== Luhansk ====
- East Ukrainian Volodymyr Dahl National University
- Luhansk State Academy of Culture and Arts
- Luhansk State Medical University
- Luhansk Taras Shevchenko National University

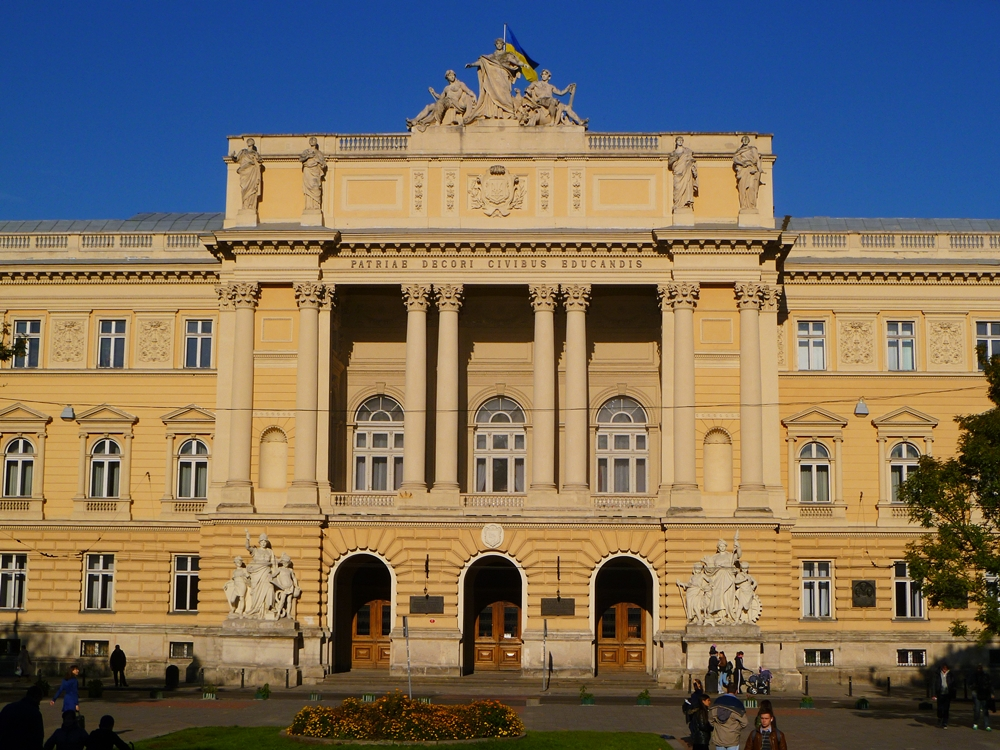
Ivan Franko National University of Lviv

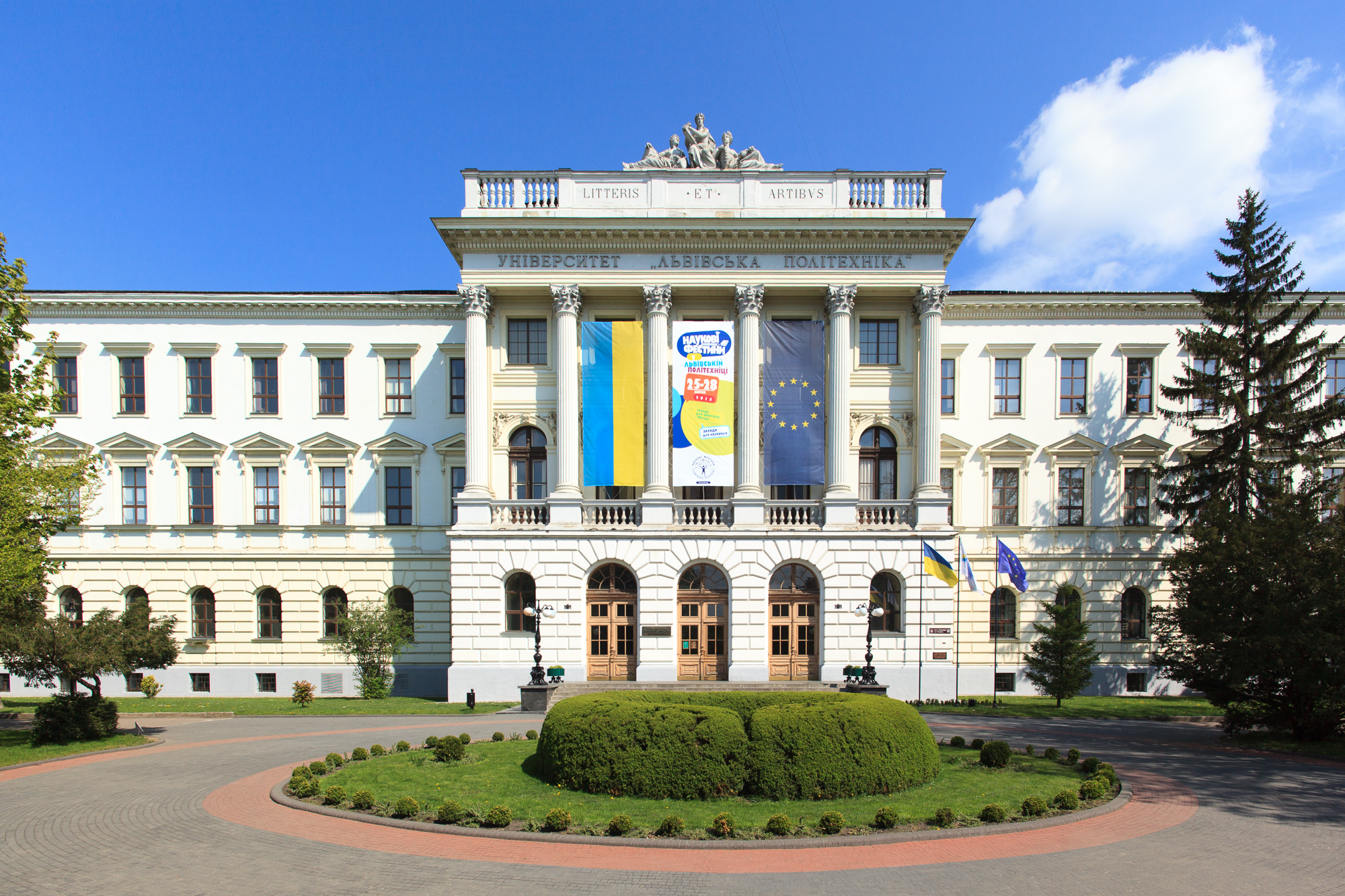
Lviv Polytechnic

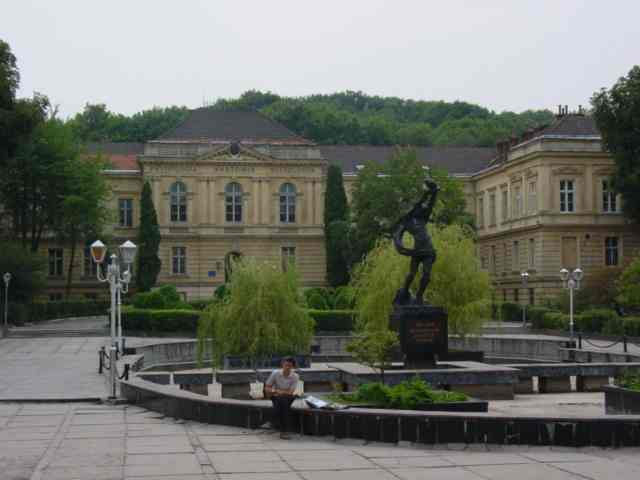
Danylo Halytsky Lviv National Medical University

=== Lviv Oblast ===
The following colleges and universities are in the Lviv Oblast.

==== Drohobych ====
Drohobych State Pedagogical University of Ivan Franko

==== Lviv ====
- Lviv National Agrarian University
- Army Academy of Hetman Petro Sahaydachnyy
- Danylo Halytsky Lviv National Medical University
- Institute of Physical Optics
- Ivan Franko National University of Lviv
- Lviv Banking Institute of University of Banking
- Lviv National Academy of Arts
- Lviv National Music Academy
- Lviv National Stepan Gzhytsky University of Veterinary Medicine and Biotechnology
- Lviv Polytechnic
- Lviv State University of Life Safety
- Lviv State University of Physical Culture
- Lviv University of Trade and Economics
- National Forestry and Wood Technology University of Ukraine
- Roman Catholic Seminary in Lviv
- Ukrainian Academy of Printing
- Ukrainian Catholic University

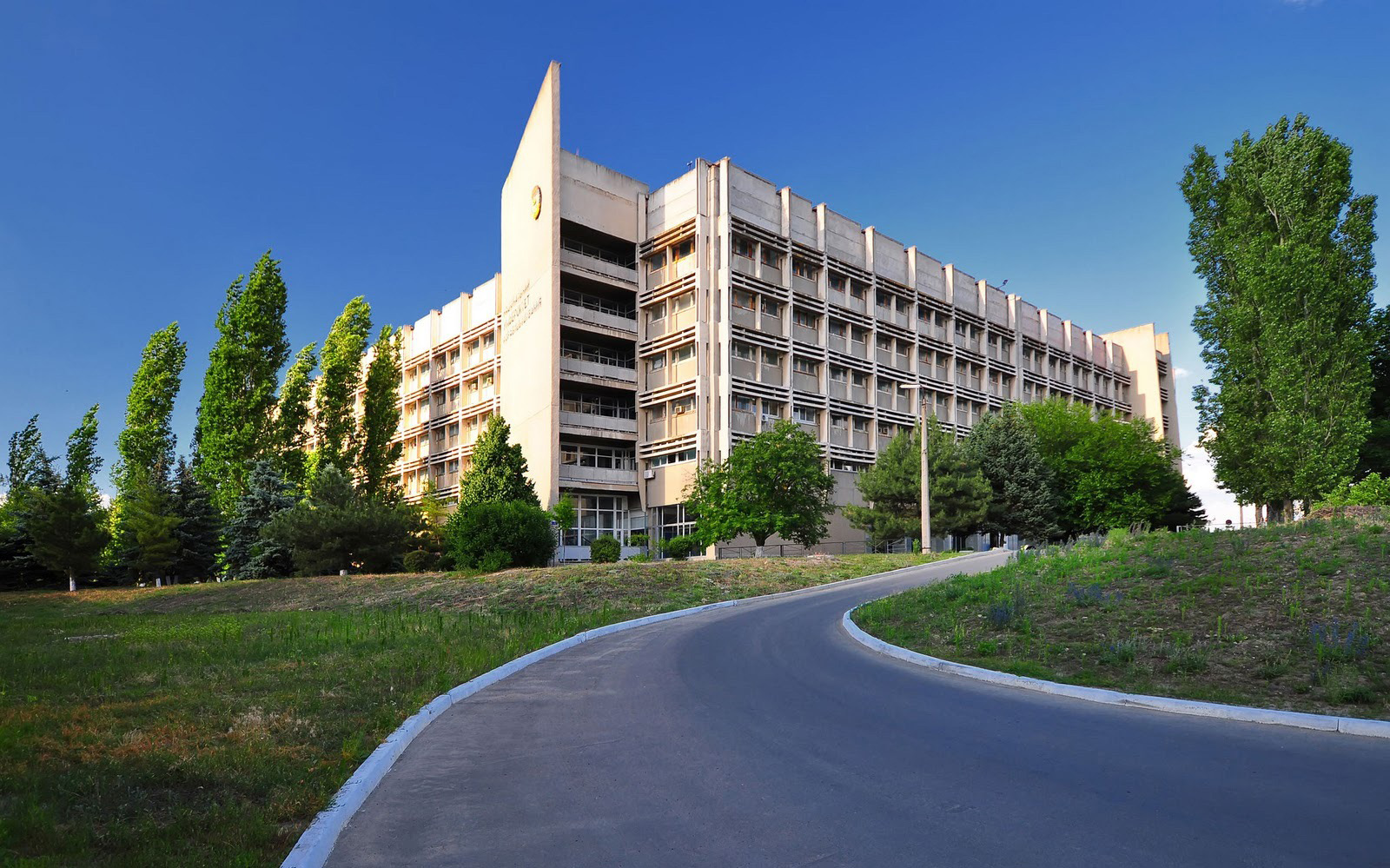
Admiral Makarov National University of Shipbuilding

=== Mykolaiv Oblast ===
The following universities are located in the Mykolaiv Oblast.

==== Mykolaiv ====
- Admiral Makarov National University of Shipbuilding
- Mykolayiv National University named after V. Sukhomlynskyi
- Mykolayiv State Agrarian University
- Petro Mohyla Black Sea State University
- Pylyp Orlyk International Classic University

=== Odesa Oblast ===
The following colleges and universities are located in the Odesa Oblast.

==== Izmail ====
Izmail State University of Humanities

==== Odesa ====
- Filatov Institute of Eye Diseases and Tissue Therapy
- International Humanitarian University
- K. D. Ushinsky South Ukrainian National Pedagogical University
- Odesa Conservatory
- Odesa Institute of Trade and Economics of Kyiv National University of Trade and Economics
- Odesa International Medical University
- Odesa Maritime Academy
- Odessa Maritime College of Fish Industry named after O. Solyanyk
- Odesa National Academy of Food Technologies
- Odesa National Academy of Telecommunications
- Odesa National Economics University
- Odesa National Maritime University
- Odesa National Medical University
- Odesa National Polytechnic University
- Odesa National Technological University
- Odesa Regional Institute for Public Administration of the National Academy for Public Administration
- Odesa State Academy of Civil Engineering and Architecture
- Odesa State Academy of Technical Regulation and Quality
- Odesa State Agrarian University
- Odessa National University (ONU)
  - National University Odesa Law Academy
  - Odesa State Environmental University

=== Poltava Oblast ===
The following colleges and universities are located in the Poltava Oblast district.

==== Kremenchuk ====
  - Kremenchuk Flight College of Kharkiv National University of Internal Affairs (I–II accreditation level)
- Kremenchuk Mykhailo Ostrohradskyi National University

==== Lubny ====
University of Luhansk, Lubny campus

==== Myrhorod ====
University of Luhansk, Myrhorod campus

==== Poltava ====
- University of Luhansk, Poltava campus
- Poltava National Technical University
- Poltava National V. G. Korolenko Pedagogical University
- Poltava State Agrarian Academy
- Poltava State Medical and Dental University
  - Poltava State Medical University
- Poltava University of Economics and Trade

=== Rivne Oblast ===
The following colleges and universities are located in the Rivne Oblast.

==== Ostroh ====
National University of Ostroh Academy

==== Rivne ====
- International University of Economics and Humanities named after Academician Stepan Demianchuk
- National University of Water Management and Nature Resources Use
- Rivne State Humanities University

=== Sumy Oblast ===
The following colleges and universities are located in the Sumy Oblast.

==== Hlukhiv ====
Hlukhiv National Pedagogical University of Oleksandr Dovzhenko

==== Sumy ====
- Sumy National Agrarian University
- Sumy State Pedagogical University named after A.S. Makarenko
- Sumy State University
- Ukrainian Academy of Banking of the National Bank of Ukraine

=== Ternopil Oblast ===
The following colleges and universities are located in the Ternopil Oblast.

==== Ternopil ====
- American-Ukrainian School of Computer Science
- Ternopil Ivan Pul'uj National Technical University (TNTU)
- Ternopil National Medical University
- Ternopil Volodymyr Hnatiuk National Pedagogical University
- West Ukrainian National University

=== Vinnytsia Oblast ===
The following colleges and universities are located in the Vinnytsia Oblast.

==== Vinnytsia ====
  - Vinnytsia Institute of Economics and Social Sciences of the Open International University of Human Development "Ukraine"
- National Pirogov Medical University
- Vasyl' Stus Donetsk National University
- Vinnytsia National Technical University
- Vinnytsia State Agrarian University
- Vinnytsia State Pedagogical University of Mykhailo Kotsyubynsky

=== Volyn Oblast ===
The following universities are located in the Volyn Oblast.

==== Lutsk ====
- Lesya Ukrainka Volyn National University
- Lutsk National Technical University

=== Zakarpattia Oblast ===
The following universities are located in the Zakarpattia Oblast.

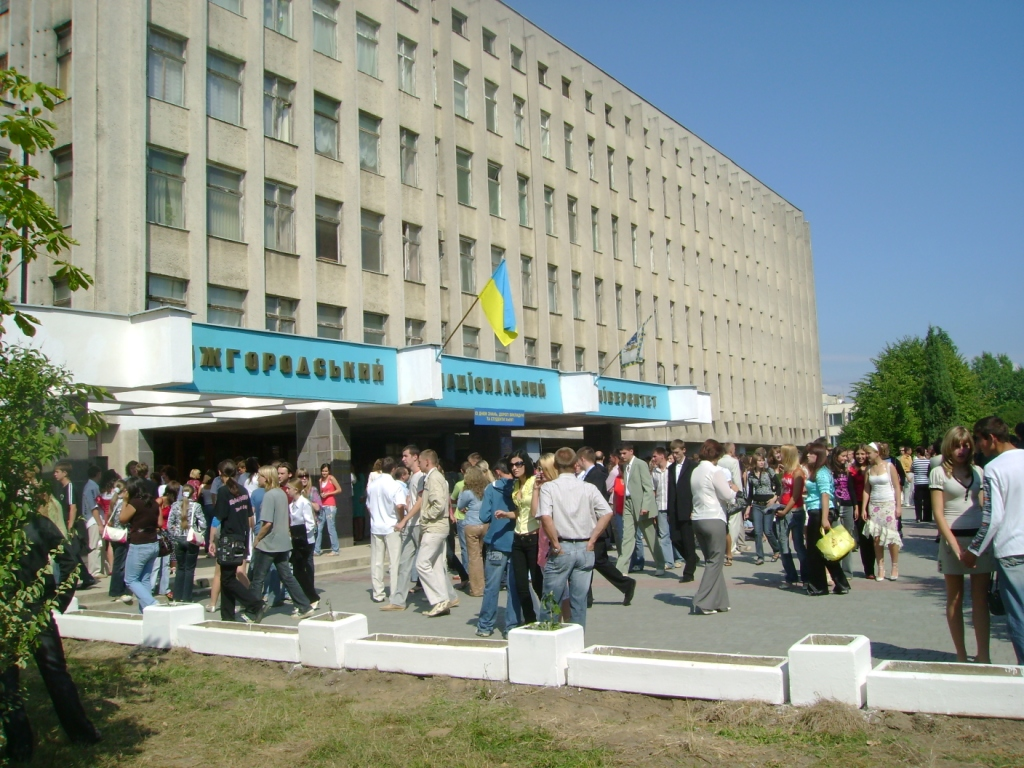
Uzhhorod National University

==== Uzhhorod ====
- Uzhhorod National University
  - Transcarpathian State University
- Transcarpathian Academy of Arts (post-secondary education)

=== Zaporizhzhia Oblast ===
The following colleges and universities are located in the Zaporizhzhia Oblast.

==== Berdiansk ====
Classic Private University, Berdiansk

==== Enerhodar ====
Classic Private University, Enerhodar

==== Melitopol ====
- Classic Private University, Meltiopol
- Bogdan Khmelnitsky Melitopol State Pedagogical University

==== Zaporizhzhia ====
- Berdiansk University of Management and Business
- Classic Private University, Zaporizhzhia
- Dmytro Motorny Tavria State Agrotechnological University
- Zaporizhzhia Bible College and Seminary
- Zaporizhzhia Institute of Economics and Information Technologies
- Zaporizhzhia National University
  - Zaporizhzhia State Engineering Academy
- Zaporizhzhia Polytechnic National University
- Zaporizhzhia State Medical and Pharmaceutical University

=== Zhytomyr Oblast ===
The following universities are located in the Zhytomyr Oblast.

==== Zhytomyr ====
- Polissia National University
- Zhytomyr Polytechnic State Technology

== See also ==
- Higher education in Ukraine
- List of culture universities in Ukraine
- List of medical universities in Ukraine
