= Kseniya Lyapina =

Ukrainian politician (born 1964)

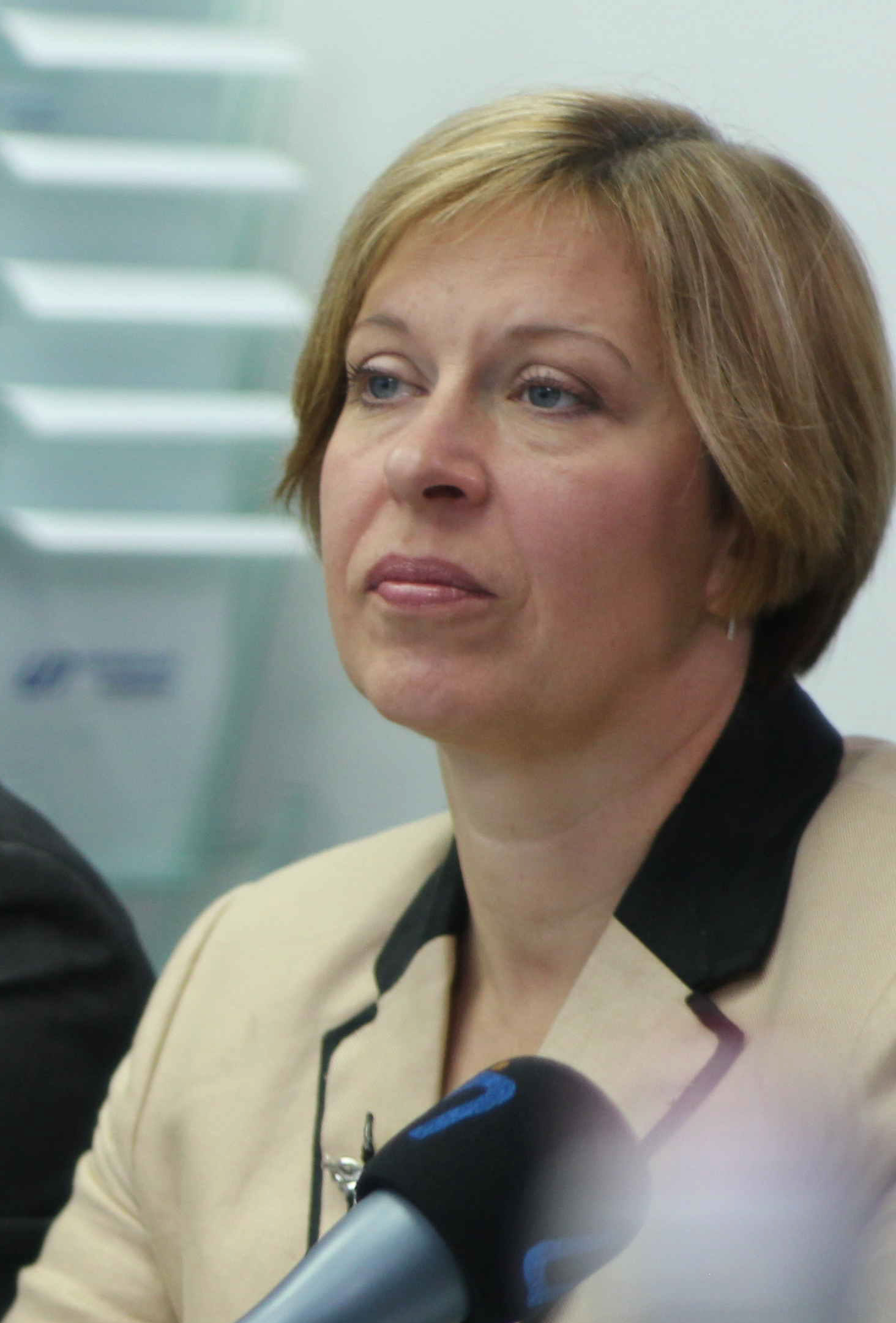
Kseniya Lyapina

Kseniya Mykhailivna Lyapina (Ляпіна Ксенія Михайлівна, born 5 May 1964) is a Ukrainian politician and People's Deputy of Ukraine. Deputy chairman of the party "For Ukraine!", and head of the Kyiv regional organization (since 2009). Head of the State Regulatory Service of Ukraine (from January 2015 to October 2019).

== Early life and education ==
From 1981 to 1987, Lyapina studied at the Kyiv Polytechnic Institute, majoring in Engineering and Mathematics. In 1994, she graduated from the Kyiv Institute of Business and Technology as an accountant-economist. In 2002, Lyapina obtained a master's degree in legal regulation of the economy.

== Career ==
From 1987 to 1992, she worked as an engineer-mathematician at the All-Ukrainian organization “Octava”. She continued her professional path as a research fellow at the Laboratory of Information and Computing Machines of the Scientific Center of Radiation Medicine at the National Academy of Medical Sciences of Ukraine (1992-1997).

From 1993 to 1998, Lyapina was a financial director at the “Tooles LTD” joint venture. At the same time, she was the Head of the Analytical Group of the Information Center of the Association for Promotion of the Development of Private Entrepreneurship "Yednannia" (1996-1998). From 1998 to 2000, Lyapina coordinated the analytical and expert group of the Coordination and Expert Center of Associations of Entrepreneurs of Ukraine. Then, from 2000 to 2005, she was the Institute of Competitive Society project coordinator.

Lyapina was an adviser on public grounds of:

- 1996 - 1998 - People's Deputy Yuriy Zaporozhets;
- 1998 - 2000 - Ukrainian politician Yuriy Yekhanurov;
- 2000 - 2002 - Ukrainian politician Serhiy Teryokhin;
- 2000 - 2001 - Prime Minister of Viktor Yushchenko.

From May 2005 to October 2006, Lyapina was a freelance adviser to the President of Ukraine, Viktor Yushchenko. She was a Chairman of the Council of Entrepreneurs under the Cabinet of Ministers of Ukraine (May 2005 - December 2006) and the First Vice-president of the Tender Chamber of Ukraine (2005-2007).

Lyapina was a member of the Council of the People's Union of the political party "Our Ukraine" (March 2005 - December 2009) and a member of the Presidium of the Council of the People's Union "Our Ukraine" (December 2006 - December 2009). She was a deputy chairman of the political party "For Ukraine!" and the head of the Kyiv regional organization (since December 2009).

By order of the Cabinet of Ministers of Ukraine on January 9, 2015, No. 1, Lyapina was appointed the Head of the State Regulatory Service of Ukraine. She was dismissed from her position on October 9, 2019.

Lyapina speaks English and is the author of numerous publications on entrepreneurship development.

=== Electoral history ===
From April 2005 to May 2006, Lyapina was a People's Deputy of Ukraine of the 4th convocation from Viktor Yushchenko's "Our Ukraine" Bloc, No. 88 on the list. She was a member of the Committee on Industrial Policy and Entrepreneurship (June - September 2005) and Deputy Chairman (since September 2005).

From April 2006 to June 2007, Lyapina was a People's Deputy of Ukraine of the 5th convocation from the "Our Ukraine" Bloc, No. 7 on the list. She was a member of the Nasha Ukraine Bloc faction (since April 2006). Lyapina was a chairman of the Subcommittee on Regulatory Policy and Entrepreneurship of the Committee on Industrial and Regulatory Policy and Entrepreneurship (since July 2006).

From November 2007 to December 2012, Lyapina was a People's deputy of Ukraine of the 6th convocation from the "Our Ukraine–People's Self-Defense Bloc", No. 8 on the list. At the time of the elections, she was the head of the analytical group of the public organization "Institute of Competitive Society" and a member of the National Assembly "Our Ukraine." Lyapina was a member of the "Our Ukraine - People's Self-Defense Bloc" (since November 2007). She was a Deputy Chairman of the Committee on Industrial and Regulatory Policy and Entrepreneurship (since December 2007), and a member of the Special Control Commission of the Verkhovna Rada of Ukraine on Privatization (since December 2007).

From December 12, 2012, to November 27, 2014, Lyapina was a People's Deputy of Ukraine of the 7th convocation from the All-Ukrainian Union "Batkivshchyna" party, elected in single-mandate district No. 216 of Kyiv. She was a deputy chairman of the committee, Chairman of the Subcommittee on Bankruptcy, Property, and Other Property Rights of the Committee on Economic Policy, and a member of the Special Control Commission of the Verkhovna Rada of Ukraine on Privatization.
