= Kyiv Institute =

Kyiv Institute or Kiev Institute may refer to:

- Kyiv Institute for Noble Maidens (1838–1917) former school
- Kyiv Institute of Art, now National Academy of Visual Arts and Architecture
- Kyiv Institute of Business and Technology
- Kyiv Institute of Civil Aviation Engineers, now National Aviation University
- Kyiv Institute of National Economy, now Kyiv National Economic University
- Kyiv Institute of Trade and Economics, now Kyiv National University of Trade and Economics
