= Transcarpathian State University =

Public university in Uzhhorod, Ukraine

Coordinates: 48.6063°N 22.2650°E

- ДЗВО "Закарпатський державний університет"
- Type: Public
- Established: 1996
- Rector: Ivan Artiomov, acting
- Location: Uzhhorod, Ukraine
- Campus: Urban
- Affiliations: Uzhhorod National University, Ministry of Education and Science of Ukraine
- Website: www.uznu.net

The Transcarpathian State University (abbr. ZakDU, Ukrainian: Закарпатський державний університет, ЗакДУ), in the city of Uzhhorod in Ukraine, is one of the major public universities in Zakarpatska Oblast. It was founded as Uzhhorod State Institute of Information Sciences, Economics and Law (UzhDIIEP) in 1995. In 2004 it was renamed Transcarpathian State University. In February 2013, the Transcarpathian State University was attached to Uzhhorod National University by order of the Cabinet of Ministers of Ukraine

== Academics ==
The university consists of 5 faculties and 5 general university departments:

- Faculty of Law;
- Faculty of Economics and Management;
- Faculty of International Relations;
- Faculty of International Business and International Economics;
- Faculty of Information Sciences;
- Department of Social Sciences and Tourism;
- Department of the Ukrainian Language and General Culture;
- Department of Foreign Languages;
- Department of Psychological and Pedagogical Disciplines and Physical Training;
- Department of Public Administration.

The Distance Learning Center is a component of TcSU.

The university trains its students in the following fields and specialties:

- International Relations, "Country Study";
- Law Science, specializations: "Investigative and Criminal", "Judicial and Prosecute", "Administrative and Legal";
- Accounting;
- Economic Cybernetics;
- Business Activity;
- Informational Operating Systems and Technologies;
- Programming for Automatized and Calculating Systems.

There is a postgraduate department in ten specialties (day-time and correspondence learning) in the university:

- Mathematical modeling and Calculating Methods;
- Automatized Operating Systems and Advanced Information Technologies;
- World History;
- History of Ukraine;
- Economic Theory;
- Finances, Currency Circulation and Credit;
- Accounting, Analysis and Audit;
- International Law;
- Civil Law and Civil Process;
- Family Law;
- Theory and History of Pedagogic Science.

== Facilities ==
Material and technical base of the university includes 7 computer classrooms, laboratories of informational teaching technologies, a publishing center, centers of electronic communication, local computer and TV networks, a training laboratory for Criminal Law Science, a library and information center with a considerable fund of modern scientific and training literature of 200,000 items and the biggest in the region reading hall, linguaphone labs equipped with computer audio and video complexes, a codification center for Law Sciences. To the services of the students and teaching staff there is a swimming-pool with a health and sport center, and a clinic. The University publishes its own magazine, Naukovyi Visnyk ("Scientific Herald"), and a regional newspaper.

== See also ==
List of universities in Ukraine
