= Vladimir Igorevich Gurevich =

Scientist, inventor and author

Vladimir I. Gurevich
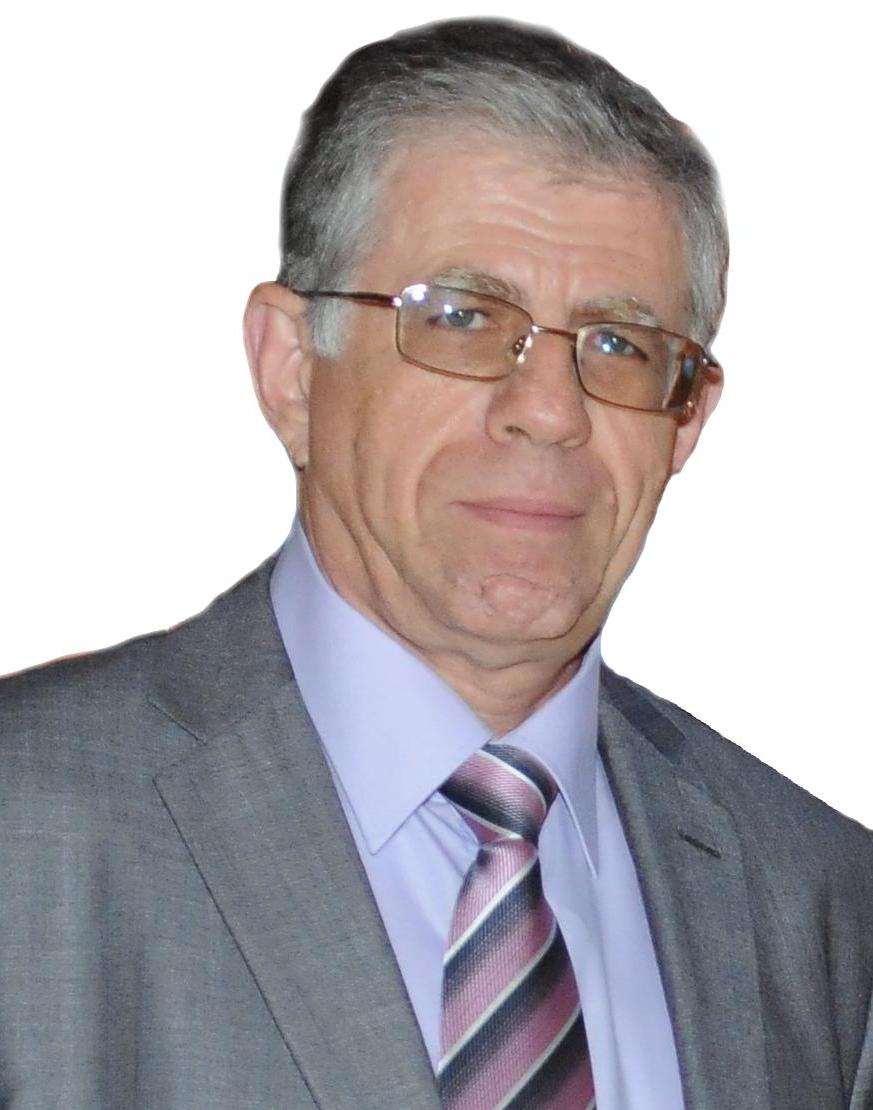
- Born: 1956 (age 69–70); Kharkiv, Ukraine
- Education: Kharkiv Petro Vasylenko National Technical University of Agriculture
- Known for: High voltage interface relays
- Scientific career
- Fields: Electrical Engineering
- Workplaces: Israel Electric Corporation, Kharkiv Petro Vasylenko National Technical University of Agriculture
- Website: www.gurevich-publications.com

Vladimir Igorevich Gurevich (Russian: Владимир Игоревич Гуревич) is a Ukrainian scientist, inventor and author in the field of electrical engineering with 18 books, more than 250 journal papers and over 100 patents on the topic of relays, electrical engineering, electronics, EMP Protection Problems.

== Early life and education ==
V. I. Gurevich was born in Kharkiv, Ukraine, in 1956. He received an M.S.E.E. degree (1978) at the Kharkiv Petro Vasylenko National Technical University of Agriculture, and a Candidate of Sciences (Ph.D.) degree, 1986, at the National Technical University Kharkiv Polytechnic Institute. His academic and professional career includes: assistant, associate, and full (honorary) professor at the Petro Vasylenko University, as well as the chief engineer and the director of Inventor, Ltd. From 1994 to 2023 he worked as a Senior Electrical Engineering Expert by the Israel Electric Corporation. Since 2023, he has been the CEO of a private company Industrial EMP Solutions, which develops new strategy, methods and means for protecting critical civilian infrastructure against nuclear electromagnetic pulse.

Gurevich is the founder of a new kind of electrical relays called gerkotrones, also known as high voltage interface relays, which are used in control and protection circuits of high voltage (10-100 kV) high power equipment. He personally developed and supervised R&D of electrical and electronic devices for many military applications and also developed and organized production of many kinds of automatic devices and systems for industrial and power applications.

A significant part of Gurevich's work is also devoted to the problem of reliability of digital protective relays. In recent years, he has published dozens of papers and 6 books, wherein he discusses protection means of the electronic equipment of power plants and substations against nuclear electromagnetic pulse.

Gurevich is Expert of High Power Transient Phenomena, with the International Electrotechnical Commission - IEC (Standardization for protection civilian equipment, systems and installations from High Altitude Electromagnetic Pulse - HEMP at nuclear detonations and from sources of intentional electromagnetic interference (IEMI).

Gurevich is International Editorial Board member of the International Journal of Research Studies in Electrical and Electronics Engineers, and Electrical Engineering & Electromechanics

== Selected books ==
- Protection Devices and Systems for High-Voltage Applications, New York: Marcel Dekker, 2003, 292 p.
- Electric Relays: Principles and Applications, New York – London – Boca Raton: CRC Press (Taylor & Francis Group), 2005, 704 p.
- Electronic Devices on Discrete Components for Industrial and Power Engineering, New York – London – Boca Raton: CRC Press (Taylor & Francis Group), 2008, 420 p.
- Digital Protective Relays: Problems and Solutions, New York – London – Boca Raton: CRC Press (Taylor & Francis Group), 2010, 404 p.
- Power Supply Devices and Systems of Relay Protection, New York – London – Boca Raton: CRC Press (Taylor & Francis Group), 2013, 264 p.
- Cyber and Electromagnetic Threats in Modern Relay Protection, New York – London – Boca Raton: CRC Press (Taylor & Francis Group), 2014, 222 p.
- Protection of Substation Critical Equipment Against Intentional Electromagnetic Threats - London: Wiley, 2016, 300 p.
- Protecting Electrical Equipment: Good Practices for Preventing High Altitude Electromagnetic Pulse Impacts - De Gruyter, Berlin, 2019, 400 p
- Protecting Electrical Equipment: New Practices for Preventing High Altitude Electromagnetic Pulse Impacts - De Gruyter, Berlin, 2021, 204 p
- Nuclear Electromagnetic Pulse: Practical Guide for Protection Critical Infrastructure - Lambert Academic Publishing, 2023, 460 p. ISBN 978-620-5-63396-0
- EMP Protection of Critical Civilian Infrastructure: Problems and Solutions - Lambert Academic Publishing, 2023, 216 p. ISBN 978-620-2-78735-2

The last book has been translated from English into six additional languages:

Title	Publishing House	ISBN
EMP-Schutz kritischer ziviler Infrastrukturen (German)	Verlag Unser Wissen	ISBN 978-620-7-52894-3
Protección EMP de infraestructuras civiles críticas] (Spanish	Ediciones Nuestro Conocimiento	ISBN 978-620-7-52895-0
Protection des infrastructures civiles critiques contre les perturbations électromagnétiques (French)	Editions Notre Savoir	ISBN 978-620-7-52896-7
Protezione EMP delle infrastrutture civili critiche (Italian)	Edizioni Sapienza	ISBN 978-620-7-52897-4
Proteção EMP de infra-estruturas civis críticas] (Portuguese	Edições Nosso Conhecimento	ISBN 978-620-7-52898-1
Защита от ЭМИ критически важных объектов гражданской инфраструктуры (Russian)	Sciencia Scripts	ISBN 978-620-7-52899-8
