= High-voltage interface relay =

High voltage interface relays, a.k.a., interface relays: or coupling relays or insulating interfaces is a special class of electrical relays designed to provide informational and electrical compatibility between functional components isolated from each other and not allowing for a direct connection due to a high difference of potentials. A common design principle of these devices is a special galvanic isolation module between the input (control) and the output (switching) circuits of the relay. Interface relays are widely used in control and protection systems of high voltage (10-100 kV) electronic and electrophysical equipment and in high power installations.

== Classification ==
Any electromagnetic relay has a certain level of isolation between the input and output circuits. However, in ordinary relays, this function is not prevalent and, hence, not considered in the existing system of relay classification. In interface relays, however, the property of galvanic isolation (decoupling) between the input and output circuits is significantly bolstered, and parameters of the galvanic isolation have an utmost importance from standpoint of the functions performed by this relay. On the other hand, the parameters associated with switching capacity are secondary and can significantly vary in interface relays with the same level of galvanic decoupling.

In this respect, categorization of interface relays into existing classes of ordinary relays is arguable. Rather, it seems more appropriate to categorize them as a separate class of electrical relays and classify according to characteristics of the galvanic decoupling unit

by insulation voltage level:

- low level (to 10 kV)
- medium level (10 to 100 kV)
- high level (above 100 kV)

by construction of galvanic isolation module:

- opto-electronic
- electromagnetic (transformer)
- pneumatic
- radio frequency
- ultrasonic
- electrohydrolic
- with mechanical transmission

by operational (execution) speed:

- super fast (up to 100 μsec)
- fast (100 μsec to 3 ms)
- inertial (above 3 ms)

Although such classification may seem arbitrary, it fully reflects the most important properties of interface relays that have a critical effect on the functions performed by them.

== Opto-electronic interface relays ==
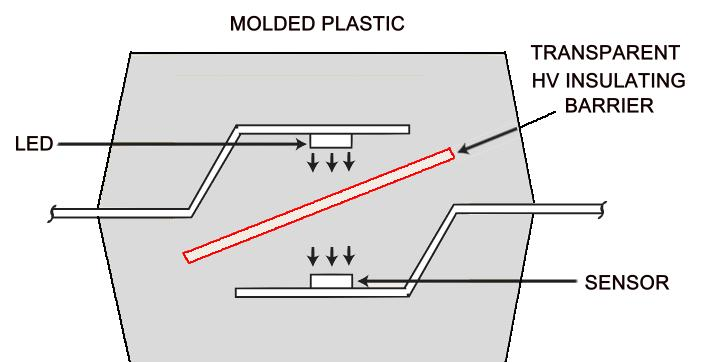
Opto-electronic interface relay. The HV insulator provides decoupling of circuits under different potentials.

The developmental trends of interface relay technology suggest the use of opto-isolator as the prevailing design principle of interface relays. An opto-isolator can be implemented in terms of an LED and a phototransistor (or photothyristor or a photodiode) or a lamp and a photoresistor. An example of an opto-electronic interface relay is shown in the figure. The transparent high voltage insulating barrier provides galvanic isolation of the circuits under the difference of potentials up to 5-7 kV. For higher voltages, they use an optical fiber, the length of which (depending on the voltage level) can take from dozens of centimeters to several meters.

Criticism

It is agreed that the most important characteristic of opto-electronic systems is their noise robustness and insensitivity to electromagnetic fields. What is not considered, however, is that, in addition to the fiber optic line and the output actuator, such a system includes the source of light pulses on the transmitting side and the amplifier on the receiving side that are generally based on micro-circuitry. It is precisely these elements, with low trigger levels, that get damaged by pulse noise (interference, voltage spikes and discharges) of the high voltage power equipment, which negates the main advantage of opto-electronic systems. Moreover, the optical fibers themselves are subject to a severe negative effect of ionizing radiation and external mechanical impacts (which is critically important in military applications). The arrangement of input and output circuits of such systems needs to be widely spaced (requiring a lengthy optical fiber), which drives up the overall dimensions of interface unit. As such, the preferred use of an opto-electronic galvanic decoupling module in interface relays is not always warranted, and is merely the consequence of a stereotypical thinking of design engineers

== Reed switch based HV interface relays ==
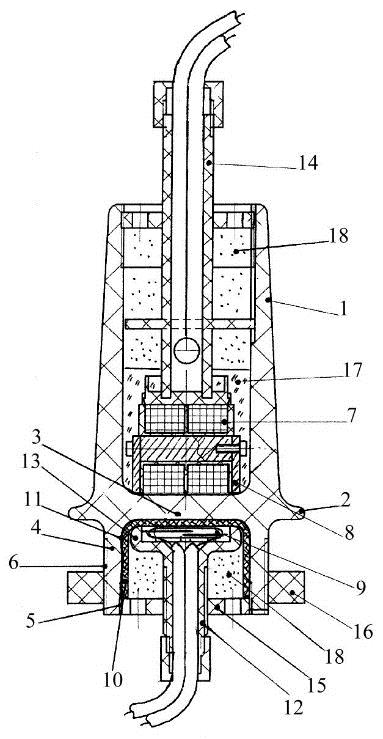
A 75 kV reed switch based interface relay (gerkotrone) 1 – HV part of main insulator formed as dielectric glass; 2 – flange; 3 – main separation part between HV and LV; 4 – LV part of main insulator; 5, 6 – internal and external thread; 7 – control winding; 8 – ferromagnetic core; 9 – reed switch; 10 – capsule for reed switch rotation; 11 – conducting coating of external surface of capsule 10 and internal surface of LV part of main insulator 4; 12 – LV bushing; 13 – reed switch mounting plate; 14 – HV bushing; 15 – reed switch position fixation element; 16 – dielectric nut; 17 – lower layer of epoxy compound with cooper powder (60-70%); 18 – dielectric epoxy resin.

A special kind of high voltage (HV) interface relays (which do not fall under the existing classification discussed above) are called gerkotrones — see the figure on the right. They were designed and developed by Vladimir Gurevich and offer a number of benefits over other types of interface relays. These include: design parsimony; mechanical, environmental and operational robustness; reliability and relatively low cost. Another important advantage of gerkotrones is the possibility of their installation directly on HV buses, which minimizes the dimensions of a protection system (unlike the aforementioned opto-electronic interfaces that require lengthy optical fibers).

These advantages command gerkotrones' widespread use in commercial and military applications in on-board, mobile and stationary powerful radio-electronic equipment, in relay protection and automation systems of electrical networks, in electrophysical installations, in power converter technology, etc.
