= Classic Private University =

Private university in Ukraine

- Класичний приватний університет
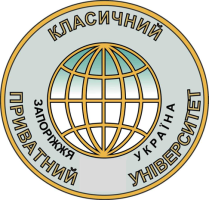
- University logo
- Former name: Humanitarian University "ZIDMU"
- Motto: Dedication to intellectual, spiritual and physical development of the students
- Type: Private
- Established: 1992; 34 years ago
- Accreditation: Ministry of Education and Science of Ukraine (Note: Higher educational institution of the IV level of accreditation)
- Rector: Oharenko Viktor Mykolayovych
- Academic staff: ▲303
- Students: ▲10,000
- Location: Zhukovskoho St, 70, Zaporizhzhia, Zaporizhzhia Oblast, 69002, Ukraine; 47°49′27″N 35°10′36″E
- Campus: Urban, in several cities
- Website: www.zhu.edu.ua

The Classic Private University (Ukrainian: Класичний приватний університет, romanized: Klasychnyi pryvatnyi universytet) is a university in Ukraine. It was founded as Zaporizhzhia Institute of State and Municipal Administration (ZIDMU) in 1992. In November 2007, it changed its name from the "Humanitarian University "ZIDMU" to the "Classical Private University". The university has 6 institutes and a and it offers postgraduate and doctoral programs in 11 specialties. There are five specialized academic councils for doctoral defense.

== History ==
The university was founded in 1992 as International Institute of Public and Municipal Administration.

1996 – The Institution was renamed into Zaporizhzhia Institute of Public and Municipal Administration.

1998 – The Scientific and Educational Complex was established, which included Institutions of higher education of all levels of accreditation (I-IV), technical colleges, gymnasiums and schools.

1999 – The Institute obtained the IIIrd level of accreditation and a new comfortable six-storied building was launched.

2000 – According to the Order of the Ministry of Education and Science of Ukraine the Institution obtained the status of the University of the Humanities under the name “University of the Humanities “ZIPMA”.

2003 – A student hotel and an elementary 1-4 grade school were opened.

2004 – The Institutes of Postgraduate Education and Distance Learning were opened having their own buildings. Melitopol and Energodar Institutes of Public and Municipal Administration of the University of the Humanities “ZIPMA” began functioning.

2005 – The university obtained the ІVth level of accreditation. The construction of the six-storied comfortable building (for the Health, Sports and Tourism Faculty) was completed.

2006 – The construction of a new seven-storied building for the Law Faculty began. The research Institute of Public Administration and Local Self-Government was opened. The University of the Humanities "ZIPMA" was included into the State Register of scientific institutions to be granted the government support.

On the base of the University of the Humanities three specialized scientific councils to defend the thesis for getting Ph.D. degree in the following fields were opened:

- Special and branch of sociology;
- mechanisms of public administration;
- Economics, organization and management of enterprises.

2007 – According to the independent UNESCO evaluation (rating) the university was evaluated as the best institution of higher education in the city. The areas of training were expanded and a new status obtained - Classical University.

2008 – 6 specialized scientific councils for defending dissertation (including 2 Doctorate Degree councils) function at the Classic Private University. A new 7-storied building for the Law Institute named after V.Stashys was launched. The Classic Private University obtained the license that enables to teach foreign students. The Classic Private University becomes a member of the International Association of the Universities. The Center “Talented” and the journal under the title “Younger scientist’s school” were created.

2009 – The Classic Private University changed its organizational structure: the transition from faculty to institute organization system was undertaken. The Classic Private University obtained the license for the Bachelor program in "Design". The most talented high school graduates were granted special CPU scholarship.

2010 – The Classic Private University signed Magna Charta Universitetum. The university re-obtained the IVth level of accreditation

2011 – The Center "Talented" of the Classic Private University conducted All-Ukrainian contest of the Minor Academy of Sciences "Junior". Oleksandriya and Berdiansk Institutes of Public and Municipal Administration were founded

2012 – according to 2012 year rating “TOP-200 Ukraine” among the universities of the IIIrd-IVth level of accreditation the Classic Private University took the 4th place among the private Institutions of higher education, 110th place – among all the institutions and the 30th place as to the quality of education rating – which is the best position among the institutions of higher education of the Region.

== Campuses and buildings ==
Buildings of the Classical Private University: the main building, the building of the Law Institute named after Volodymyr Stashys, the buildiong of the Institute of Health, Sport and Tourism, the college premises.

== Institutes and faculties ==
=== The Institute of Management ===
offers the following programs: management of organizations and administration with specializations: management in products and services market; investment management; program engineering; geodesy, cartography and land management; theology (with the denomination - Orthodox).

The institute also offers the following master programs: management of organizations and administration (according to economic activity: trade, financial activity, agriculture); international management; administrative management; business administration; public service; land use and cadastre; higher school pedagogics; management of institution of higher education.

Educational activity is carried out by a highly qualified teaching staff, leading Ukrainian scientists famous both in Ukraine and abroad. The Institute of Management develops student science, and annually invites leading scientists to participate in international conferences. Lectures and seminars are held using Up-to-date facilities (auditoriums, computer classes, laboratories).

=== The Institute of Economics ===
The Institute of Economics offers programs in economic cybernetics, enterprise economics, marketing, accounting and auditing, and finance and credit. Instruction is provided by regional economists as well as visiting specialists from other Ukrainian universities.

=== The Institute of Journalism and Mass Communication ===
offers the following programs: publishing and editing; advertising and public relations; psychology; sociology; design. The Institute seeks to create a new model of students training. The new model of training means liberality of thinking of a creative personality, political impartiality and in-depth intellectual outlook able to integrate actively into information European society. The institute has a training laboratory of television, radio and photography, Cinema Club, Press Club, information agency, website and a newspaper. The students can gain professional experience at the editorial and publishing departments.

=== The Institute of Foreign Philology ===
offers a Bachelor program on “Philology” and Specialist to Master programs on "Translation" and "Language and Literature (English)". The institute offers opportunities for obtaining higher education which makes a graduate student competitive on the labor market. A modern computer linguistic class, Up-to-date technical training laboratory and language provide the future specialists with appropriate conditions for learning three foreign languages. In addition, students are optionally offered to study a fourth language (Spanish, Arabic, Japanese or Hebrew). The teaching staff is international, including well-known Ukrainian scientists as well as academics from the US and Europe.

=== Scientific laboratory of renaissance studies ===
is a joint project of Taras Shevchenko Institute of Literature NAS of Ukraine and Classic Private University. Their activity is focused on the development of renaissance studies in Ukraine and the representation of its achievements in the global intellectual environment. Students, undergraduates, postgraduates and young scientists are involved in its activity

=== The Health, Sports and Tourism Institute ===
offers the following educational programs: Physical Education, Human Health, Tourism, Hotel and Restaurant Business. The Students of the Health, Sport and Tourism Institute successfully combine training, sports activities and tourism. The students of the Institute took part in the XXXth Olympic Games in London (2012). Anton Zakharov is an honored master of sports in diving; the master of sports of international class in Gymnastics is Stepko Oleg, in swimming - Chuev Eliasand in of judo - Stanislav Bondarenko.

=== Law Institute named after Volodymyr Stashys ===
trains specialists in law and international law according to the latest achievements of national and international science both for public and private organizations, including government bodies, courts, solicitors, prosecutors of internal affairs, consulates, tax and customs inspections, scientific and educational institutions. The academic curriculum and other teaching materials are confirmed with the governing documents and teaching recommendations of the Ministry of Education and Science, Youth and Sports of Ukraine and the corresponding documents of the leading educational institutions of Ukraine: National University “Iaroslav Mudryi Law Academy of Ukraine”, Taras Shevchenko National University of Kyiv, The Ivan Franko National University of Lviv. Training laboratory "Legal Clinic" is functioning at the Institute of Law named after Volodymyr Stashys of the Classic Private University.

=== The Institute of Information Technology of Education ===
The main tasks solved by the Institute of Information Technology in Education are:

- providing educational services to students of all majors through the use of information and communication (distance) learning technologies;
- the development, improvement, implementation of advanced learning technologies based on modern information and communication technologies;
- providing scientific, technical, industrial, innovation, operations with the introduction of modern information and communication technologies in the educational process;
- improving the management of training activities of the CPU by creating a single information scientific and educational environment of the CPU;
- Hardware and software complex information system support.

The staff of the institute maintains the work of the CPU software. On the basis of modern computer software package MOODLE for curriculum and academic programs support of the Classic Private University and the College of the university were created as web-sites "Virtual University" and "College of the Classic Private University."

=== Center for Professional (re-training) Development ===
provides the adult population of the region with the opportunity to get a second education and obtain a diploma of re-training (of the State standard) in the fields of journalism, accounting and auditing, international economics, economics of enterprise, finance and credit, social work, banking, management of organization and administration, automated systems software, physical rehabilitation, physical education, psychology, translation, language and literature (English), marketing, tourism. The Center for Professional (re-training) Development has ongoing training courses for the specialists in small business, professional accountants with the study of the program "1h: Enterprise 8.2»; Training program on “Modern information technology".

=== The College of the Classic Private University ===
offers the degree of "younger specialist" in the fields of physical education, publishing and editing, social work, economics of enterprise, merchandising and commercial activities, applied statistics, public service organization, travel services, social pedagogics, design of printed materials, law, software development.

== Honorary Doctors and famous alumni ==
- Peklushenko О.N. – a Ukrainian politician, Head of Zaporizhzhya Regional State Administration, Deputy of the Verkhovna Rada of VI convocation
- Berezhnoy A.P. – First Deputy Head of Zaporizhzhya Regional State Administration (2077-2010)
- Mamaev O.J. – Deputy Head of Zaporizhzhya Regional Department of Justice
- Sukhinin L.V. – Deputy Head of Zaporizhzhya Consumer Rights Protection Department
- Kuzmin A.S. – Head of the Lenin District Administration of Zaporizhzhia city.
- Kuzmina V.V. – Head of Kommunarsky Department of Civil Registration of Zaporizhzhya City Department of Justice
- Goloveshko V.V. – Assistant Head of Zaporizhzhya Regional State Administration
- Vasyukov G.G. – Law firm “Vasyukov Ostapyuk and Partners” (Kyiv)
- Pokataeva O.V. – The First Vice-rector of the Classic Private University, Doctor of Law, Doctor of Economics, Professor
- Shmelev A.J. – Deputy Director on Legal Affairs, LLC "Alexander";
- Kapitonov A. – master of sports of international level. A black belt in Shotokan Karate (3rd Dan), on hand-to-hand combat (1st Dan). Three-time world champion and multiple winners on hand-to-hand combat. Two-time silver (2004, 2005) and bronze (2003) winner of the European Championship in Karate
- Pritula A. – President of Ukrainian Federation of "Spas", UNESCO expert consultant on section “History”.

== Awards and reputation ==
In the 2012 "Top-200 Ukraine" university ranking for higher education institutions of the III and IV accreditation levels, Classic Private University ranked fourth among non-state educational institutions and 110th overall nationally. In the specific sub-ranking for quality of education, the university placed 30th, which was the highest position achieved by any higher education institution within the region.

== Science and Research ==
Science and Research are devoted to the systematic study of social, legal, economic systems and processes with active participation of graduate, postgraduate, doctoral students and university staff. There are over 360 doctoral and post-graduate students at the university. The conditions for its own scientific potential growth are created at the CPU.

In order to disseminate scientific achievements and information exchange in the areas of individual expertise Classic Private University publishes books, textbooks, 10 scientific professional journals and popular scientific journal "School for young scientists." Specialized scientific councils for Doctorate Degree and PhD are functioning at the CPU on the following fields of sciences: Economics and Management of Enterprises (by economic sector), Theory and History of Sociology, Special and Branch Sociology, Social philosophy, philosophy of history, Mechanisms of Public Administration, Local Government, General Pedagogics and History of Pedagogics, Theory and Methods of Professional Education, Theory and History of Journalism, Theory and History of Social Communication, Theory and History of Publishing and Editing, Economic Theory and History of Economic Thought, Economics and Management of State Economy, Money, Finance, Credit, Criminal Law and Criminology, Criminal and Executive Law, Criminal Process and Criminology, Legal Expertise, Operative and crime-detection activity; Pedagogic and Age Psychology, Theory and history of political and law studies, Administrative law and process, financial law, Information Law.

The university teaching staff conducts scientific research on 39 scientific topics. The CPU is the founder and publisher of:

- Scientific and practical journal “State and Regions” in four series (“Economy and Entrepreneurship”, “Law”, “Public Administration”, “The Humanities”, Social Communication),
- International interuniversity collection of scientific articles “Social Technology. Actual Problems of Theory and Practice”,
- Collections of scientific articles “Pedagogy and Psychologies of Creative Personality Formation: Problems and Perspectives”, “Institutional vector of economic development”; “Law and Public Administration”; “Renaissance Studies”; “Theory and Practice of modern Psychology”;
- Annual collection of research papers “Science and Higher Education”.

Teaching staff of the Classic Private University participates in scientific events that are held annually at the university:

- National Scientific Conference "Updates of the conceptual framework of professional and general education";
- International scientific and practical conference “Current issues of public law";
- National Scientific Conference "Scientific and practical aspects of optimization of management in government and local government authorities”
- International Shakespeare Conference;
- International Scientific Conference "Socio-economic development of Ukraine and Regions»;
- International scientific and practical conference “Current problems of physical education, rehabilitation, sports and tourism”;
- International scientific conference "Formation of effective mechanisms of management in modern economy: Theory and Practice";
- International scientific conference of students and young scientists "Science and Higher Education”

The Classic Private University offers post graduate (19 majors) and doctorate programs (5 majors).

- Postgraduate Studies
  - 08.00.01 – Economic Theory and History of Economic Thought;
  - 08.00.03 – Economics and Management of State Economy;
  - 08.00.04 – Economics and Management of Enterprises (by economic sector);
  - 10.01.01 – Literature of Foreign Countries;
  - 10.02.04 – Germanic languages;
  - 12.00.07 – Administrative law and process, financial law, information law;
  - 12.00.08 – Criminal Law and Criminology; Criminal - Executive Law;
  - 12.00.09 – Criminal Process and Criminology; Legal Expertise. Operative and crime-detection activity;
  - 13.00.01 – General Pedagogics and History of Pedagogics;
  - 13.00.03 – Correctional Pedagogics;
  - 13.00.04 – Theory and Methods of Professional Education;
  - 19.00.05 – Social Psychology; Psychology of Social Work;
  - 19.00.07 – Pedagogic and Age Psychology;
  - 22.00.01 – Theory and History of Sociology;
  - 22.00.04 – Branch and Special Sociology;
  - 25.00.02 – Mechanisms of Public Administration;
  - 25.00.04 – Local Government;
  - 27.00.01 – Theory and History of Social Communication;
  - 27.00.04 – Theory and History of Journalism;
- Doctorate Studies:
  - 08.00.04 – Economics and Management of Enterprises (by economic sector);
  - 13.00.04 – Theory and Methods of Professional Education;
  - 22.00.04 – Special and Branch Sociology;
  - 25.00.02 – Mechanisms of Public Administration;
  - 27.00.04 – Theory and History of Journalism

== International cooperation ==
International cooperation is an integral part of the Classic Private University and is aimed at the integration of the university into the European educational space. University develops cooperation with well-known foreign universities, organizations, associations, agencies and funds, participating in international projects, attracting skilled foreign professionals to teach in Classic Private University, conducting joint research.

International relations of the university include a number of countries: USA, Canada, UK, Poland, Norway, Germany, Russia, Belarus, Georgia, China, Lithuania, South Korea, the Netherlands, Spain, Austria, Turkey, Israel, Moldova, Sweden, Bulgaria, Japan, Czech. Cooperation within international agreements with foreign universities and the reception of foreign delegations, professors is carried out successfully.

Classic Private University participates in international projects. The faculty of the university is actively involved in international exchange programs and internships, as well as trips abroad. Every year the students participate in international internships abroad and international exchange programs. In October 2008, Classic Private University became a member of the International Association of Universities (International Association of Universities) and was included in the UNESCO database, which greatly improves its ranking at the national and international market of educational services.

One of the outstanding achievements of Сlassic Private University is the 2010 signing of the Magna Carta of Universities (Magna Charta Universitetum) on September 17, 2010, which was held at the University of Bologna in Bologna, Italy. Ukraine's participation in the implementation of the Bologna declaration of Ukraine's entry into the European educational space enhances the Classic Private University's international activity. Classic Private University provides education for foreign students from Russia, Armenia, Georgia and Serbia.

== See also ==
- FC HU ZIDMU-Spartak Zaporizhzhia, football team
- List of universities in Ukraine
