= King Danylo University =

University in Ivano-Frankivsk, Ukraine

Coordinates: 48°54′55″N 24°42′40″E

- Університет Короля Данила
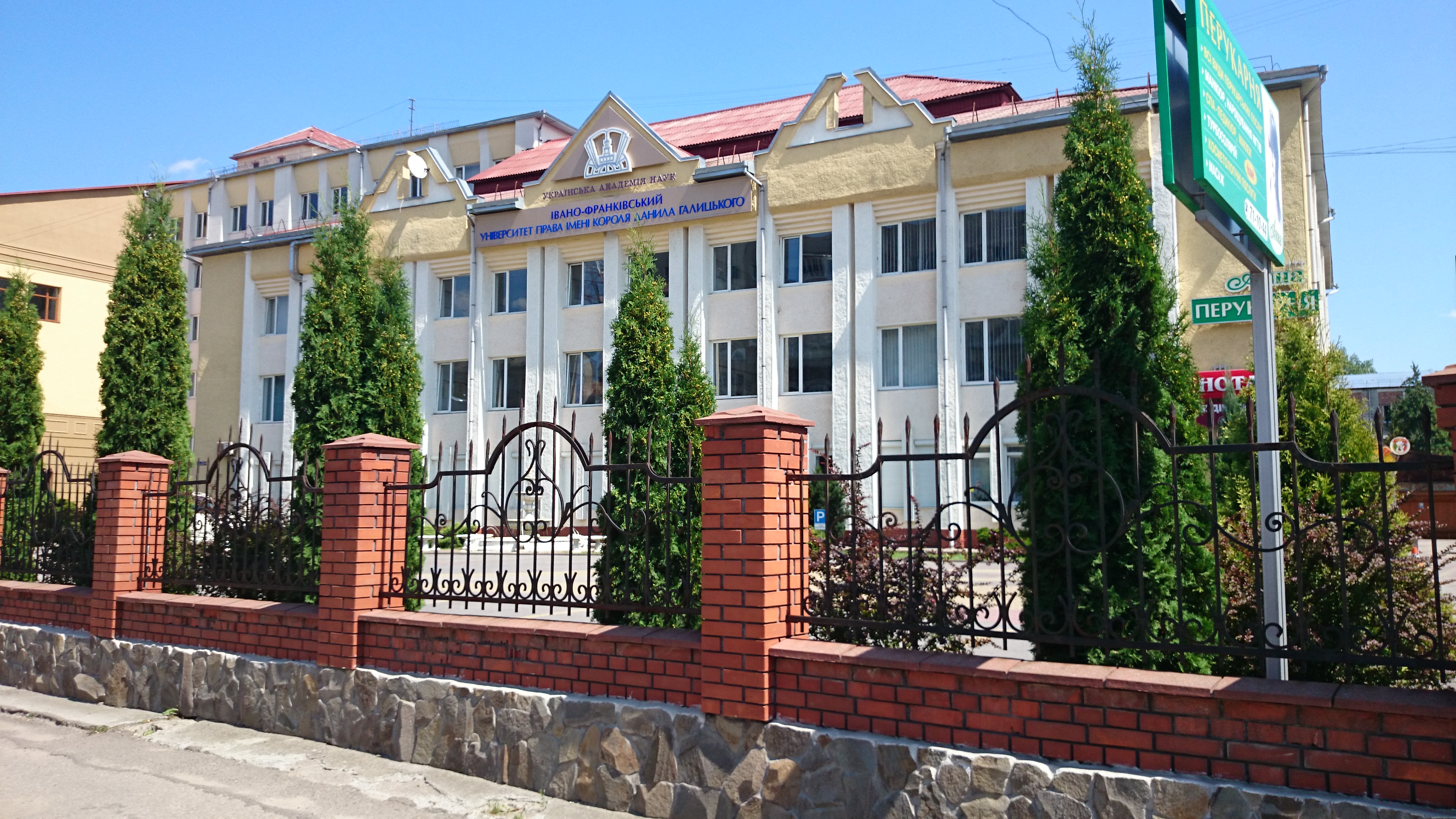
- Established: 14 december 1997
- Accreditation: Ministry of Education and Science of Ukraine
- Rector: Myroslav Lutskyi
- Students: 6400
- Location: Konovalets St, 35, Ivano-Frankivsk, Ukraine

King Danylo University is a private higher education institution founded in 1997 in Ivano-Frankivsk. The university offers undergraduate, master's, and postgraduate programs across more than 20 diverse fields of study. In 2024, KDU ranked among the top four private universities in Ukraine in terms of the number of fee-paying students admitted. As of 2026, the total student population is approximately 6,400.

== History ==
The university (originally the Ivano-Frankivsk Institute of Law, Economics, and Construction) was founded in 1997 by the rector-priest, full member of the Ukrainian Academy of Sciences (UAS), Doctor of Law, Doctor of Philosophy, Doctor of Canon Law, Professor, and Honored Educator of Ukraine, Father Ivan Lutskyi. The institution began its activities in a rented facility of 500 square meters, with 300 students and four programs of study.

According to Ivan Mykhailovych's vision, the primary mission of the institution was to ensure access to higher education for every talented student.

For its active efforts to improve the quality of modern education, the university was awarded a diploma in the ranking competition of higher education institutions in Ukraine (2002). The name of its founder and first rector was also included in the registers of the books “500 Influential Personalities of Ukraine” and “Golden Names”. The institute, and later the university, was additionally recognized with diplomas as a laureate of the Ukrainian higher education ranking “Sophia of Kyiv – 2005, 2007, 2008” in the category of higher education institutions for its significant contribution to the development of the national higher education system.

In 2007, the university was renamed the Ivano-Frankivsk University of Law named after King Danylo of Halych. Following the death of its founder and first rector, Father Ivan Lutskyi, in 2014, his legacy was continued by his children: Andriy, Myroslav, and Nataliia. Andriy Ivanovych Lutskyi became the rector of the university. Since May 2017, the institution has been known as King Danylo University and continues to pursue development, the introduction of new programs, and the recruitment of leading specialists to its educational activities. The university is actively expanding international cooperation with universities in Poland, Austria, Germany, Norway, the United Kingdom, and other countries.

In 2018, King Danylo University became the first university to join the Ivano-Frankivsk IT Cluster as an affiliated member. In 2019, the university opened the first Internet of Things (IoT) laboratory in Ivano-Frankivsk. Also in 2019, King Danylo University became the first higher education institution in Ukraine to implement a new governance system. Under this system, the university is managed by a Supervisory Board, a President, and a Rector. The first President was the former rector, Andriy Lutskyi, while Vitalii Khromets was appointed as Rector. Since 2020, the Rector of King Danylo University has been Myroslav Lutskyi.

The university implements innovative educational programs, distance learning programs, and educational modules involving practitioners. It integrates educational programs with labor market needs through dual education and also offers modular training.

In addition, the university systematically organizes cultural and artistic events. Since 2015, it has hosted the Christmas-New Year festival “Battle of the Nativity Scenes” (renamed in 2026 as the Festival of Nativity Scenes and Malankas)

In 2015, the first beauty contest Mr & Miss University 2015 took place, which has since become a traditional event

The same year, the first “Voice of the University” contest was organized.

Every year, the university holds a career guidance event for children called “Day of Professions”, bringing together representatives of around 40 professions.

In 2017, the project “School Has Talent” was launched, giving talented schoolchildren the opportunity to showcase their abilities, with winners receiving free education at KDU.

“Night at the University” is an event where students and faculty spend leisure time together in an informal atmosphere.

In 2019, King Danylo University hosted its first dance competition, Dance Cup of King Danylo University, organized in collaboration with the dance team of Vladyslav Yama.

The university also serves as a platform for meetings with successful individuals who share their experiences with students and guests. Among the invited guests were Ukrainian Presidents Viktor Yushchenko and Petro Poroshenko, musicians Sviatoslav Vakarchuk and DZIDZIO, and writers Serhiy Zhadan, Iren Rozdobudko, and others.

== Structure ==
King Danylo University trains specialists in the fields of law, architecture, construction, IT technologies, design, journalism, psychology, philology, and medicine.

Departments:

- Department of Architecture and Construction
- Department of Business and Management
- Department of Design
- Department of Pop and Vocal Arts
- Department of Law named after Academician of the UAS, Father Ivan Lutskyi
- Department of Psychology
- Department of Tourism and Hospitality Management
- Department of Ukrainian Philology and Social Sciences
- Department of Foreign Philology and Business Communications
- Department of Information Technologies
- Department of Journalism, Advertising, and Public Relations

Educational Institutions

- The Professional College of King Danylo University provides training for the educational-professional degree of Junior Specialist. Upon completion, graduates have the opportunity to enter higher courses at the university under an accelerated program. Training is offered across a wide range of specialties aligned with the university’s main fields, including law, architecture, design, software engineering, tourism, and management. (Director – Volodymyr Yaslyk)

Research Institutes and Societies

- The Research Institute named after Academician Ivan Lutskyi (R&D Institute) has been operating within the structure of King Danylo University since 2010. Director – Roman Lutskyi.
- The Scientific Society of Young Scholars of King Danylo University is a platform for developing the scientific and creative potential of students, postgraduate students, young scientists up to 35 years old, and doctoral candidates up to 40 years old. The head of the society is Mykola Knyhnytskyi.

Legal Aid Bureau

Since 2004, the university has operated a Legal Clinic (now the Legal Aid Bureau) – a member of the Association of Legal Clinics of Ukraine. Under the supervision and coordination of the clinic’s head, Viktoriia Kuzyk, students provide free legal assistance and information to vulnerable groups of the population.

Architectural and Planning Bureau TOWER

The project-production architectural and planning bureau TOWER has been operating within King Danylo University since 2011, bringing together professional architects, structural engineers, designers, and engineers. It specializes in the design and implementation of various architectural projects.

Professional Publications

- Art of Justice – a journal included in the List of Scientific Professional Publications of Ukraine, in which results of dissertation research for Doctor of Science, Candidate of Science, and Doctor of Philosophy degrees can be published (Category “B”).

Fields of Study

King Danylo University provides training at all levels of higher education: Bachelor’s, Master’s, Educational-Scientific (Doctor of Philosophy), and Scientific (Doctor of Science).

Programs include:

- Architecture and Urban Planning
- Management
- Construction and Civil Engineering
- Hospitality, Restaurant Management, and Catering
- Design
- Journalism
- Software Engineering
- Marketing
- Music Arts
- Accounting and Taxation
- Law
- Law Enforcement
- Public Administration
- Psychology
- Philology
- Finance, Banking, Insurance, and Capital Markets
- Tourism and Recreation

== Father Ivan Lutskyi Foundation ==
To honor the memory of the university’s founder and support talented youth, the Father Ivan Lutskyi Foundation was established in 2014. Each year, it organizes competitions whose winners receive the opportunity to study at the university either free of charge or at a discounted tuition rate. Since its inception, the foundation has awarded scholarships to more than 500 students. Participants can compete in a variety of subjects, including English, Geography, History of Ukraine, Mathematics, Law, Ukrainian Language, Christian Ethics, Information Technologies and Programming, Biology, and Chemistry. Scholarships are also awarded for excellence in creative competitions, such as creating graphic works (Thematic Postcard), journalism, the project “My City of the Future”, as well as for victories in the mini-football tournament “King Danylo Cup” and the creative project “School Has Talent”.

In addition, the foundation provides scholarships to students with high scores in the National Multi-subject Test (NMT).

== International Cooperation ==
The university has established cooperation agreements with approximately 40 institutions in various countries.

King Danylo University participates in international projects such as EARTH, RETRIEVE, LuxHyVal, SH2AMROCK, H2COVE, neuroARCH, DICOMI, and Climate Engine.

Guest lecturers at the university include scholars and practitioners from Romania, Norway, Finland, the United Kingdom, Serbia, the United States, and Denmark.

== Scientific Events ==
KDU organizes scientific events at local, national, and international levels every year, including:

- The nationwide event PR-Rally
- The Ukrainian Student Scientific Symposium “Union of Sciences: Architecture, Economics, Law”
- Scientific-practical conference in memory of Academician Father Ivan Lutskyi “Theory and Practice of Law Enforcement in the Context of Modern State-building”
- International Forum “Meaning as a Resource in Wartime: A Logotherapeutic Perspective”
- Prykarpattia Legal Forum
- Forum “Sacred Carpathians”
- International Language Forum “Tutoring and Business Communication”

== Infrastructure ==
The main university building houses lecture halls, a library, an acting studio, several dance halls, a radio studio, an outdoor sports area (on the roof), and the photo studio Galas SPACE.

The campus is located separately from the main building.

== Student Self-Government ==
The highest student executive body is the Student Council of King Danylo University. Members organize mountain trips, concerts by well-known performers, house concerts, the “Night at the University” event, creative competitions, masterclasses, book club meetings, and literary, theatrical, and film evenings. The Chair of the Student Council is Sofiia Sakhro.

Student Scientific Clubs KDU hosts scientific clubs covering various fields:

- Historical and tourism: “Scientific Tourist Studies,” “King Lev Historical Club,” Food & Future
- Legal: “Rule of Law”
- Technical: IT RoboSprint (robotics club)
- Management: “E-FOP”
- Design and architecture: “Young Architects,” “Theory and Practice of Architectural Design,” “Construction Puzzles”
- Philology: “Scientific About Language”
- Arts: “Pop and Vocal Arts: History, Theory, Practice”
- Psychology: “Personality Development in Wartime and Post-war Adaptation,” “Art Therapy Workshop,” Lokki-Students, Psychological Workshop “Time for Yourself”

== Rankings ==
In 2025, KDU was included in the prestigious Times Higher Education Impact Rankings.

== Interesting Facts ==
In 2019, the university set a record for the longest lecture. For 24 hours and 5 minutes, KDU lecturer Oleh Ihorovych Andrukhiv delivered a lecture on “The State”, establishing a national record.

== See also ==
- List of universities in Ukraine
