= Polissia National University =

Education organization in Zhytomyr, Ukraine

- ДЗВО "Поліський національний університет"
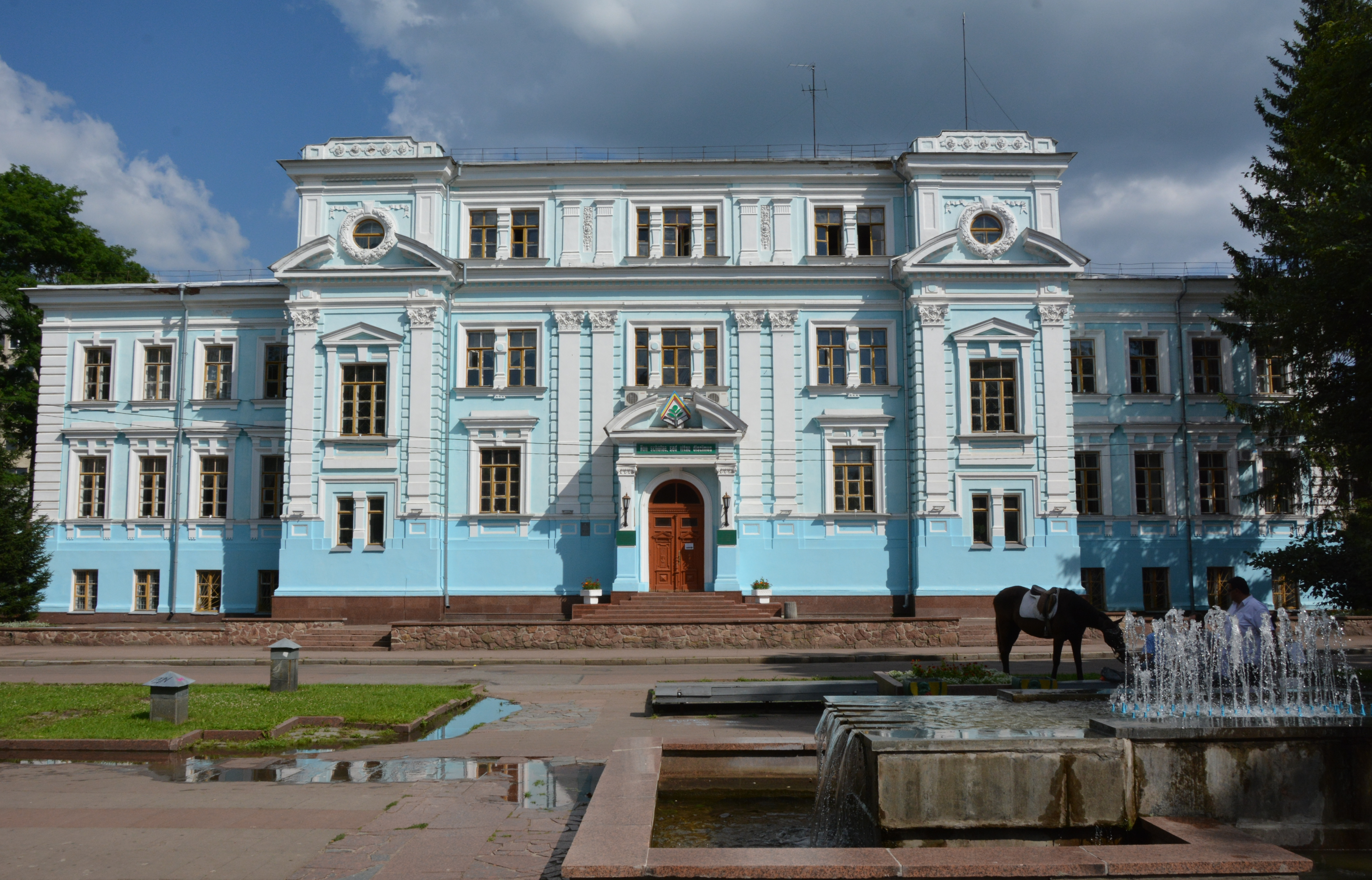
- Type: Public
- Established: 1922
- Affiliations: Ministry of Education and Science of Ukraine
- Rector: Oleg Vasylyovych Skydan
- Students: 7000+
- Location: Zhytomyr, Zhytomyr Oblast, Ukraine; 50.24861°N 28.66861°E
- Campus: Urban
- Language: Ukrainian
- Website: Official website
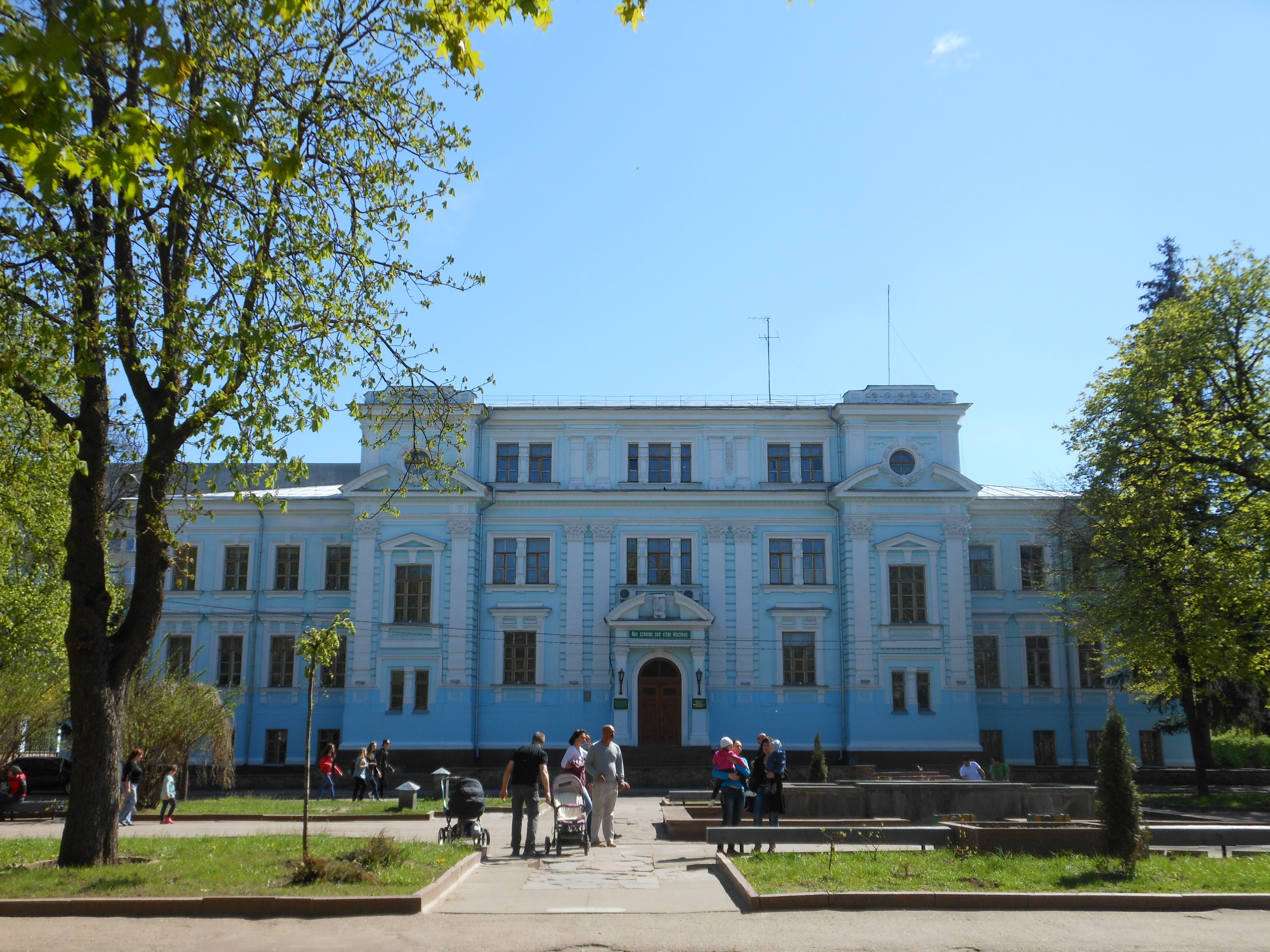

Immovable Monument of Local Significance of Ukraine
- Official name: Окружний суд (Regional courthouse)
- Type: Architecture
- Reference no.: 4448-Жт

The Polissia National University (Ukrainian: Поліський національний університет, romanized: Polìskyi natsìonalnyi unìversytet), known as the Zhytomyr National Agroecological University prior to 2020, is a public university in Zhytomyr, Ukraine. The university provides specialists in the majority of national economic sectors in the Ukrainian Polesia (Zhytomyr, Rivne and Volyn oblasts). The university has some seven thousand students and is divided into eight faculties (agronomy, technology of animal production and processing, veterinary medicine, agricultural engineering and energetics, ecology and law, forestry, accounting and finance, economics and management) and 42 departments.

== History ==
Polissia National University was established in 1922 on the basis of Novo-Chortoryi Agricultural School of Novorad-Volynskyi district and was initially named Volyn Agronomic College. It received national status on August 27, 2008.

== International profile ==
On 6 July 2017 Polissia National University became the first among the national agricultural universities, and the second-highest educational institution in Ukraine, to join the EUROSCI Network, a network of international academic players that brings together universities, research centers, departments, and expert groups, with a common interest in the study of the European Union and European integration from a scientific perspective.

An important direction of international activity is to provide students with the opportunity to study the latest agricultural technologies and the organization of business activities in the field of agricultural development in the agricultural economies of the United Kingdom, Germany, France, Denmark, the Netherlands, Poland, the United States.

== See also ==
List of universities in Ukraine
