= Uzhhorod National University =

Public university in Uzhhorod, Ukraine

Coordinates: 48.6357°N 22.2902°E

- ДВНЗ "Ужгородський національний університет"
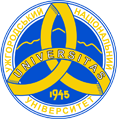
- Latin: Universitas Nationalis Uzhhorodiensis
- Motto: The more we know, the more we can do!
- Type: Public
- Established: 1945
- Affiliations: Ministry of Education and Science of Ukraine
- Rector: Prof. Volodymyr Smolanka, Doctor of Medical Sciences
- Faculty: 3000
- Students: 13600
- Location: 3 Narodna Square, Uzhhorod, Ukraine
- Campus: Urban
- Website: Official website
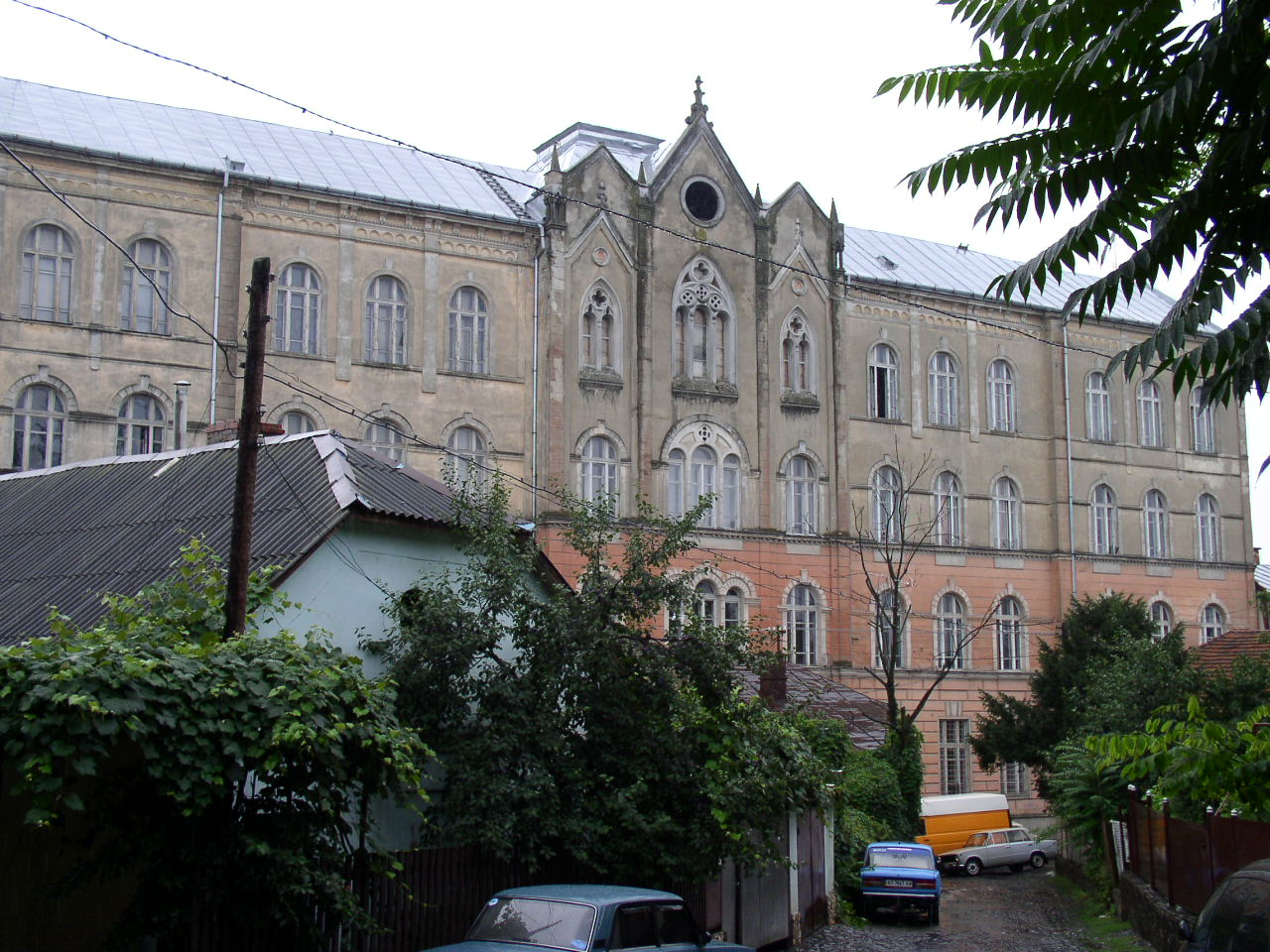

University rankings

Regional – Overall
- QS Emerging Europe and Central Asia: 251-300 (2022)

The Uzhhorod National University (abbr. UzhNU, Ukrainian: ДЗВО "Ужгородський національний університет" (УжНУ), romanized: DZVO 'Uzhhorodskyi natsionalnyi universytet', lit. 'State higher educational institution "Uzhhorod National University"') is a Ukrainian state-sponsored university in the city of Uzhhorod in Ukraine.

== General information ==
It was founded on October 18, 1945. It is one of the classic universities of Ukraine, accredited at the IV (highest) level of accreditation (license of the Ministry of Education of Ukraine series AG No.582508).

The university has 20 faculties (biological, geographical, engineering, history and international relations, mathematical, medical, medical No.2, dental, economic, health and physical education, information technology, postgraduate education and pre-University training, social sciences, foreign philology, tourism and international communications, physical, philological, international economic relations, chemical, legal), 2 educational and scientific institutes, 115 departments, territorially separated structural subdivision ‘Branch of SHEI’ UzhNU ‘in Lviv, natural sciences and humanities college.

The university is included in the list of the best - in terms of educational, scientific, international, innovative and information activities - higher education institutions of Ukraine, occupying 20th positions in the consolidated ranking, 11th place in the Webometrics rating, 14th − in the SciVerse Scopus rating, 12th − in the U- rating. Multirank, 13th in the QS EECA University Rankings and 11th in the TOP-200 rankings of Ukrainian universities.

Uzhhorod National University has a full-time academic staff comprising 1285 scientific and pedagogical workers, including 158 doctors of sciences, professors, and 715 candidates of sciences and associate professors. 284 people work part-time, including 34 doctors of sciences, professors, 132 candidates of sciences, associate professors. The share of doctors of sciences, professors is 12.2%, candidates of sciences, associate professors - 54%. Among the higher education institutions in Ukraine in terms of the number of teachers with scientific degrees UzhNU − in 5th place.

The university has 2 corresponding members of the National Academy of Sciences of Ukraine, 5 academicians of the Academy of Sciences of Ukraine, 13 honored workers of science and technology of Ukraine, 9 honored educators of Ukraine, 6 honored lawyers of Ukraine, 15 honored doctors of Ukraine, 5 honored inventors of Ukraine, honored journalist of Ukraine.

At the end of 2020, 14,946 students were studying at Uzhhorod National University, College of Natural Sciences and Humanities. 5,315 people receive higher education at the expense of the state budget, and 9,631 people at the expense of individuals and legal entities. Form of study: full-time and part-time. Specialists are trained at the educational and qualification levels: bachelor, doctor of philosophy, master.

== History and modernity ==
Uzhhorod National University is the first higher educational institution in the history of Zakarpattia, which has passed a long and thorny path of its formation, and its prehistory dates back several centuries.

College of Jesuit Fathers (1613−1773)

The chronology of the origin of higher education in Zakarpattia can be traced back to 1613, when the county prefect of Ung and Zemplin count Georgy Druget on November 23, 1613, allowed to establish a monastery of the Jesuit order and a collegium (college / higher gymnasium) in Humenno (now Slovakia). During the XVII century, the college provided five grades educational program.

Uzhhorod Royal Catholic Higher Gymnasium (1773−1920)

On March 1, 1775, Empress Maria Theresa transferred the buildings of the former Uzhhorod Jesuit College to the ownership of the Greek Catholic Diocese of Mukachevo. After a site was determined in 1778 for the construction of a new gymnasium near the former Jesuit college, a new building was built for the gymnasium on the site of the old barracks in 1783–1785 (now the Uzhhorod Commercial Technical School is located here).

Uzhhorod State Real Russian Gymnasium (1920−1945)

In 1920, the Drugetiv gymnasium was renamed the Uzhhorod State Real Russian Gymnasium. On October 27, 1938, the commission of the Ukrainian Academic Committee in Prague considered the project of organizing the Ukrainian University in Carpathian Ukraine. On March 9, 1939, the ‘Draft Law on the Establishment of the Ukrainian State University in Khust’ was developed. The university was supposed to start operating on October 1, 1939, but the Hungarian occupation of the region in March prevented this.

Uzhhorod State University

On October 18, 1945, the government of the Ukrainian SSR and the Central Committee of the Communist Party adopted a joint resolution ‘On the opening of a State University in Uzhhorod.’ The university began its existence with 4 faculties. On February 1, 1946, 160 first-year students of four faculties began their history, philology, medicine, and biology studies. On July 1 of the same year, there were 15 departments with 1 professor, 9 associate professors, 14 senior lecturers, 11 lecturers, and 8 assistants.

In 2000, for a significant contribution to the development of national education and science by the Decree of the President of Ukraine, the university was awarded the status of national and renamed Uzhhorod National University with the fourth level of accreditation. In February 2013, the Transcarpathian State University was attached to Uzhhorod National University by order of the Cabinet of Ministers of Ukraine.

== International cooperation ==
Uzhhorod National University is a member of the Association of Universities of the Carpathian Region ( ACRU ), which is a member of the Association of European Universities (EUA) and is an associate member of the International Association of Universities (IAU). The university cooperates with 125 partners from different countries, including Charles University, Technical University of Prague (Czech Republic), Corvin University, University of State and Law. L. Koshuta (Hungary), Kosice University, Pavol Jozef Shafarik university, Comenius (Slovakia), University of Oradea, University of Cluj, Babes-Boyai (Romania), Institute of German Studies, University of Koblenz and Landau, University of Regensburg (Germany), Association of Homeopathic Medicine, Rome (Italy), University of Zagreb (Croatia), Slovak Medical University (Bratislava) and others. In 2020, 7 new international bilateral agreements, 7 agreements on the implementation of international projects and 8 agreements to support Erasmus + academic mobility were concluded.

The catalyst for international activities in 2020 was participation in global rankings (Times Higher Education World University Rankings, QS World University Rankings by Region, U-Multirank, UI Green Metric World University Rankings, Webometrics Ranking of World's Universities), associations, and consortia.

Necessary for further integration into the European scientific space is Uzhhorod National University's membership in international associations: Magna Charta Universitatum, the Danube Rectors Conference, the European Universities Association, the International Consortium of Universities.

The university is included in the European scientific space, Uzhhorod National University students have the opportunity to study at leading universities in Poland, Lithuania, Slovakia, Hungary, Romania, the Czech Republic (Pomeranian Academy, University of Presov, Etves Lorand University, Debrecen University and others).

Uzhhorod National University and other educational institutions of Ukraine started the international exchange of students and teachers within the Erasmus + program in 2014. The European Union provides scholarships and covers the costs of training and accommodation. Uzhhorod National University cooperates with Slovak, Polish, Czech, Hungarian, Lithuanian, Italian, French, Croatian, and Romanian universities within the Erasmus + program. Since 2014, 115 participants of the educational process from 15 faculties of Uzhhorod National University have taken part in the Erasmus + program.

Every year UzhNU students have internships abroad − in Slovakia, Germany, Turkey, participate in international schools, training, have the opportunity to become scholarship holders and win grant programs of academic exchanges named after Fulbright (USA), The scholarship program for graduates from Ukraine by the European-University in Frankfurt (Germany), Summer International School in Vilnius (Lithuania) and others.

Starting from the 2014/2015 academic year, the university started teaching in English for foreign students majoring in ‘Medical are’ and ‘Dentistry’. In the 2020 academic year, this practice was extended to all medical specialties, the field of knowledge ‘International Economic Relations’, ‘Hotel and Restaurant Business’, ‘International Law’, ‘Social Work’, ‘Management’, ‘Computer Engineering’, ’Economics’. December 31, 2020, 1,635 international students enrolled in the university with a bachelor's or master's degree. A total of 1,724 people received educational services, including 15 graduate students and 38 clinical residents. Most international students are Indian citizens − 1222 people. Citizens of Jordan, Bangladesh, Nigeria, Ghana, Cameroon also study at Uzhhorod National University. Maldives, Zimbabwe, Austria, Czech Republic, Slovakia, Romania, Hungary, Turkey, USA, Netherlands, and other countries. People from 52 countries represent student assets.

== Science ==
The scientific base consists of research institutes, laboratories, and centers, notably the Research Institute of Solid State Physics and Chemistry, Phytotherapy, Carpathian Studies, Central Europe, and Ukrainian Studies named after prof. Molnar, Means of Analytical Technology, Political Regionalism, Brain, Trauma, Family Medicine. There are research laboratories of physical electronics with a laboratory of space research, protection of natural ecosystems, research and training center of molecular microbiology and immunology of mucous membranes, Center of Gungarology.

Based on the concluded agreements, international cooperation with 86 scientific institutions in Slovakia, Hungary, Romania, Poland, the Czech Republic, Croatia, France, Germany, Russia, the US, Italy, Lithuania, Turkey is carried out. Extensive international cooperation of the university contributes to the expansion of scientific research in various fields of knowledge: physics, chemistry, biology, medicine, philology, archeology, problems of the Carpathian region, etc.

The Council of Young Scientists of Uzhhorod National University provides informational and organizational support for young scientists and graduate students participating in grants, research internships, competitions of scientific works, conferences. In recent years, young scientists have repeatedly won grants from the President of Ukraine and scholarships of the Cabinet of Ministers of Ukraine for young scientists, participated in international (e.g., Germany, Japan, USA, Slovakia, Hungary, and other countries) and national conferences.

Uzhhorod National University is one of the largest patent holders for protecting original technical solutions among higher education institutions in Ukraine. Over the years of operation of the patent and the licensing department received more than 936 security documents. In particular, the university's research and teaching staff became the authors of patents of Ukraine for invention − 409, utility model − 526, and industrial design 1.

== Education ==
For 75 years, the university has developed its school of teaching, scientific and educational traditions. It employs 158 doctors of sciences, professors, 715 candidates of sciences, associate professors. Uzhhorod National University scientists have published 77 monographs, 16 textbooks, 60 textbooks and 84 textbooks, and 3 dictionaries in recent years alone.

The university provides a wide range of educational services and has the right to train specialists in the following educational and scientific degrees: at the first (bachelor's) level of higher education – in 70 specialties; at the second (master's) level of higher education – in 61 specialties; at the third (educational and scientific) level of higher education − from 18 specialties. List of educational programs:

Bachelor's degree

- 013 Primary education
- 014.01 Secondary education (Ukrainian language and literature)
- 014.02 Secondary education (Language and literature (English))
- 014.02 Secondary education (Language and literature (German))
- 014.02 Secondary education (Language and literature (Russian))
- 014.02 Secondary education (Language and literature (Romanian))
- 014.02 Secondary education (Language and literature (Hungarian))
- 014.02 Secondary education (Language and literature (French))
- 014.03 Secondary education (History)
- 014.04 Secondary education (Mathematics)
- 014.05 Secondary education (Biology and human health)
- 014.05 Secondary education (Biology)
- 014.06 Secondary education (Chemistry)
- 014.07 Secondary education (Geography)
- 014.08 Secondary education (Physics)
- 014.11 Secondary education (Physical education)
- 016 Special education
- 017 Physical culture and sports
- 032 History and archeology
- 033 Philosophy
- 034 Culturology
- 035.01 Philology. Ukrainian language and literature
- 035.034 Philology. Slavic languages and literatures (translation included), the first - Russian
- 035.036 Philology. Slavic languages and literatures (translation included), the first - Slovak
- 035.038 Philology Slavic languages and literatures (translation included), the first - Czech
- 035.041 Philology. Germanic languages and literatures (translation included), the first - English
- 035.043 Philology. Germanic languages and literatures (translation included), the first - German
- 035.055 Philology. Romance languages and literatures (translation included), the first - French
- 035.071 Philology. Finno-Ugric languages and literatures (translation included), the first -Hungarian
- 035.10 Philology. ‘Applied Linguistics’
- 051 Economics
- 052 Political Science
- 053 Psychology
- 054 Sociology
- 061 Journalism
- 071 Accounting and taxation
- 072 Finance, banking, and insurance
- 073 Management
- 075 Marketing
- 076 Entrepreneurship, trade, and exchange activities
- 076 Entrepreneurship, trade, and exchange activities
- 081 Right
- 091 Biology
- 101 Ecology
- 102 Chemistry
- 103 Earth Sciences
- 104 Physics and astronomy
- 105 Applied physics and nanomaterials
- 106 Geography
- 111 Mathematics
- 112 Statistics
- 113 Applied mathematics
- 121 Software engineering
- 122 Computer science
- 123 Computer engineering
- 124 System analysis
- 125 Cybersecurity
- 126 Information systems and technologies
- 131 Applied mechanics
- 151 Automation and computer-integrated technologies
- 153 Micro and nanosystem technology
- 163 Biomedical engineering
- 171 Electronics
- 172 Telecommunications and radio engineering
- 192 Construction and civil engineering
- 193 Geodesy and land management
- 203 Horticulture and viticulture
- 205 Forestry
- 206 Landscaping
- 223 Nursing
- 227 Physical therapy, occupational therapy
- 231 Social work
- 241 Hotel and restaurant business
- 242 Tourism
- 262 Law enforcement activities
- 281 Public administration
- 291 International relations, public communications, and regional studies
- 292 International economic relations
- 293 International law

Educational degree ‘DOCTOR OF PHILOSOPHY’

Educational and scientific programs of candidates for the degree of ‘Doctor of Philosophy’

- 263 ESP ‘Biology’
- 263 ESP ‘Economy’
- 229 ESP ‘History and Archeology’
- 260 ESP ‘Computer Science’
- 216 ESP ‘Mathematics’
- 230 ESP ‘Medicine’
- 225 ESP ‘International Economic Relations’
- 186 ESP ‘Educational, pedagogical sciences’
- 225 ESP ‘Political Science’
- 296 ESP ‘Law’
- 192 ESP ‘Applied Mathematics’
- 169 ESP ‘Applied Physics and Nanomaterials’
- 175 ESP ‘Sociology’
- 294 ESP ‘Dentistry’
- 227 ESP ‘Physics and astronomy’
- 94 ESP ‘Physical therapy, occupational therapy’
- 228 ESP ‘Philology’
- 167 ESP ‘Chemistry’

Educational degree ‘MASTER’

- 011 Educational, pedagogical sciences
- 014.01 Secondary education (Ukrainian language and literature)
- 014.02 Secondary education (Language and literature (English))
- 014.02 Secondary education (Language and literature (German))
- 014.02 Secondary education (Language and literature (Russian))
- 014.02 Secondary education (Language and literature (Hungarian))
- 014.03 Secondary education (History)
- 014.04 Secondary education (Mathematics)
- 014.05 Secondary education (Biology and human health)
- 014.06 Secondary education (Chemistry)
- 014.07 Secondary education (Geography)
- 014.08 Secondary education (Physics)
- 017 Physical culture and sports
- 032 History and archeology
- 033 Philosophy
- 035.01 Philology. Ukrainian language and literature
- 035.034 Philology. Slavic languages and literature (translation included), the first - Russian
- 035.036 Philology. Slavic languages and literature (translation included), the first - Slovak
- 035.038 Philology. Slavic languages and literature (translation included)., The first - Czech
- 035.041 Philology. Germanic languages and literature (translation included), the first - English
- 035.043 Philology. Germanic languages and literature (translation included), the first - German
- 035.10 Philology. Applied Linguistics
- 051 Economics
- 052 Political Science
- 053 Psychology
- 054 Sociology
- 061 Journalism
- 071 Accounting and taxation
- 072 Finance, banking, and insurance
- 073 Management
- 076 Entrepreneurship, trade, and exchange activities
- 081 Right
- 091 Biology
- 101 Ecology
- 102 Chemistry
- 104 Physics and astronomy
- 105 Applied physics and nanomaterials
- 111 Mathematics
- 113 Applied mathematics
- 121 Software engineering
- 122 Computer science
- 123 Computer engineering
- 125 Cybersecurity
- 131 Applied mechanics
- 151 Automation and computer-integrated technologies
- 153 Micro and nanosystem technology
- 171 Electronics
- 192 Construction and cvil engineering
- 193 Geodesy and land management
- 203 Horticulture and viticulture
- 205 Forestry
- 221 Dentistry
- 222 Medicine
- 223 Nursing
- 226 Pharmacy, industrial pharmacy
- 227 Physical therapy, occupational therapy
- 229 Public health
- 231 Social work
- 241 Hotel and restaurant business
- 242 Tourism
- 262 Law enforcement activities
- 281 Public administration
- 291 International relations, public communications, and regional studies
- 292 International economic relations
- 293 International law

The university’s library holds 1.7 million publications, including a collection of first editions published before 1500. It also has an electronic catalog, a digital library, an Internet center, and a Wi-Fi zone.

== Rector of the University ==
Rector Volodymy Smolanka

During the period from 1945 to the present, the rectors of the university were:

- Dobosh Stepan Vasilyevich (August–October 1945)
- Kurishko Arkady Mikhailovich (1945−1949)
- Tkachenko Grigory Vladimirovich (1949−1956)
- Lenarsky Ivan Ivanovich (1956−1961)
- Chepur Dmitry Venediktovich (1961−1977)
- Shulga Vladimir Gavrilovich (1977−1980)
- Lendel Vladimir Ivanovich (1980−1988)
- Slyvka Volodymyr Yuliiovych (1988−2004)
- Rusin Vasily Ivanovich (2004−2005)
- Vegesh Mykola Mykolayovych (2005−2012)
- Vashchuk Fedir Hryhorovych (2012−2014)
- Smolanka Volodymyr Ivanovych (2014−present)

== Management ==
- Rector Volodymyr Smolanka, Doctor of Medical Sciences, Professor.
- First Vice-Rector Oleksandr Slyvka, Doctor of Physical and Mathematical Sciences, Professor
- Vice-Rector for Research Ihor Studenyak, Doctor of Physical and Mathematical Sciences, Professor.
- Vice-rector for Scientific and Pedagogical Work Oleksandr Rohach, Doctor of Law, Professor
- Vice-Rector for Scientific and Pedagogical Work and Foreign Relations Myroslava Lendel, Doctor of Political Sciences, Associate Professor
- Vice-Rector for Scientific and Pedagogical Work Ihor Korol, Doctor of Physical and Mathematical Sciences, Associate Professor
- Vice-Rector for Administrative and Economic Affairs Dmytro Soyma.

== Structure ==
SU `Uzhhorod National University' includes the following structural units:

- 20 faculties (109 departments in all)
- 25 scientific-research institutes
- Natural Sciences and Humanities College
- Centres and laboratories
- 4 museums - zoological, archaeological, University history, a museum of ancient printed books (incunabula)
- A scientific library, university campus
- The centre of student leisure "Juventus"
- The sport complex
- The alpine skiing base "Plishka" and the Alpine (high-mountain) biological base "Kolochava"
- Botanical Gardens and a vivarium
- The sanatorium-dispensary "Skalka"
- The social-psychological service
- A dental clinic
- The "Hoverla" publishing house and the newspaper "Pohlyad"
- A media centre
- Administrative and supply economic sections/departments.

== Institutes and faculties ==
- Faculty of Biology
- Faculty of Geography
- Faculty of Economics
- Faculty of Engineering
- Faculty of Medicine
- Faculty of Medicine No.2
- Faculty of Dentistry
- Faculty of Health and Physical Education
- Faculty of Foreign Philology
- Faculty of History and International Relations
- Faculty of Information Technologies
- Faculty of Mathematics and Digital Technologies
- Faculty of International Economic Relations
- Faculty of Postgraduate Education and Pre-University Training
- Faculty of Social Sciences
- Faculty of Tourism and International Communications
- Faculty of Physics
- Faculty of Philology
- Faculty of Chemistry
- Faculty of Law
- Ukrainian-Hungarian Educational and Scientific Institute
- Educational and Scientific Institute of European Integration Research
- Natural Sciences and Humanities College
- Department of Military Training

Research institutes, Centers, and Laboratories:

- Research Institute of Physics and Chemistry of Solid States
- Research Institute of Carpathian Studies
- Research Institute of Political and Regional Studies
- M.Molnar Research Institute of Ukrainian Studies
- Scientific Educational Institute of European Integration Research
- Research Institute of Brain
- Research Institute of Central Europe
- Scientific-Research Institute of Phytotherapy
- Research Institute of Analytical Technique Means
- Educational Institute of Tourism and Recreology
- Institute of State Management and Regional Development
- Institute of Ecological and Religious Studies
- Research Centre of Slovakian Studies
- Hungarology Center
- Research Institute of State and Confessional Relations
- Center of Bohemian and Slovak Historical Studies
- Centre of Innovation and Development
- Sustainability Development Centre
- Business Center
- Centre of Psychological Assistance
- The Centre of Historical and Religious Studies “Logos”
- Centre of Medicinal Products Testing
- Laboratory of Physical Electronics and Space Research Laboratory
- Laboratory of Natural Ecosystems Protection
- Scientific Research And Educational Center Of Molecular Microbiology And The Immunology Of Mucous Membranes

== Admissions Committee ==
Address: room 228., 14 Universytetska str.

== See also ==
List of universities in Ukraine
