= Vinnytsia Institute of Economics and Social Sciences =

Private university in Vinnytsia, Ukraine

The Vinnytsia Institute of Economics and Social Sciences (Ukrainian: Вінницький соціально-економічний інститут) is a part of the Open International University of Human Development "Ukraine" (OIUHD Ukraine). Founded in 1999, the institute has eight departments. Located in Vinnytsia, Ukraine.

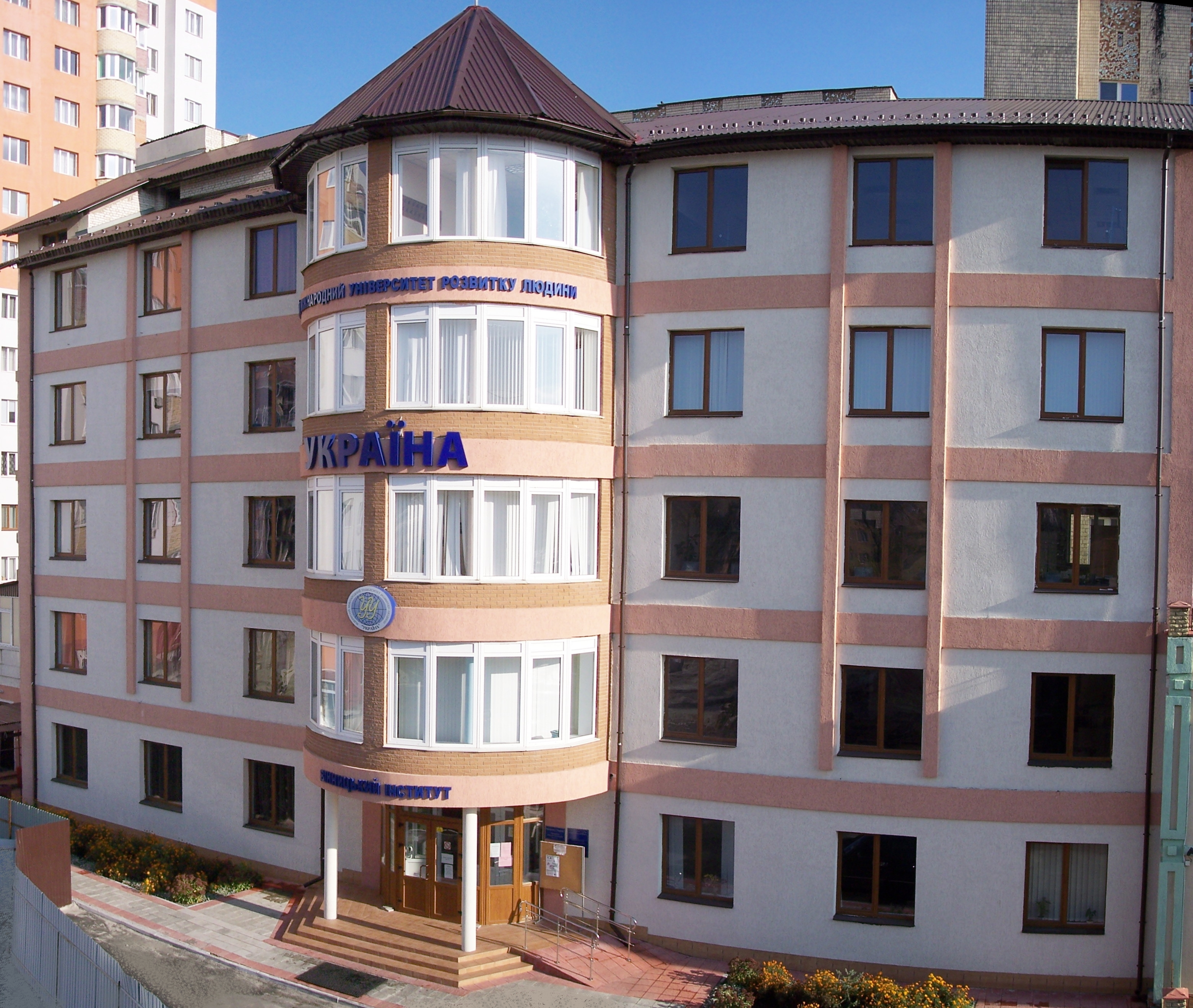

== Resources ==
Vinnytsia has classrooms and laboratories, resource rooms (for hearing-impaired students), an assembly hall, a student café, sports halls and gyms.

Its library holds more than 570,00 copies of scientific, educational, methodological literature, fiction books and periodicals. In addition, a branch of Timiriazev research library with its reading hall functions at the institute.

== Administration ==
- Hamretsky I.S. – Rector of the Institute
- Svitlak I.I. – 1-st Prorector (Vice-Rector) on Academic Activity
- Sokhatsky F.M. – Prorector (Vice-Rector) on Science and International Relations
- Bilyi V.M. – Prorector (Vice-Rector) on general problems and additional services

== Social sciences and humanities faculty ==
In 2003, the Social Sciences and Humanities faculty was founded at Vinnytsia, Since then the faculty has trained about 3000 students.

The faculty has 10 doctors of sciences, professors, 34 candidates of sciences, associate professors. The faculty members are authors of text-books and methodological manuals recommended by the Ukrainian Ministry of Education and Science, articles and abstracts published in professional journals in Ukraine and abroad.

The faculty offers courses in Law, Psychology, Sociology and Human Health.

== Economics and business faculty ==
The faculty includes three chairs:

- Economics and Finance chair;
- Management and Administration chair;
- Computer Technologies chair.

The faculty has trained over 6 000 students, who work at state and private enterprises and organizations, some of them work abroad.
