= Kharkiv Petro Vasylenko National Technical University of Agriculture =

University in Kharkiv, Ukraine

Coordinates: 48.3042°N 38.0181°E

- Харківський національний технічний університет сільського господарства ім. Петра Василенка
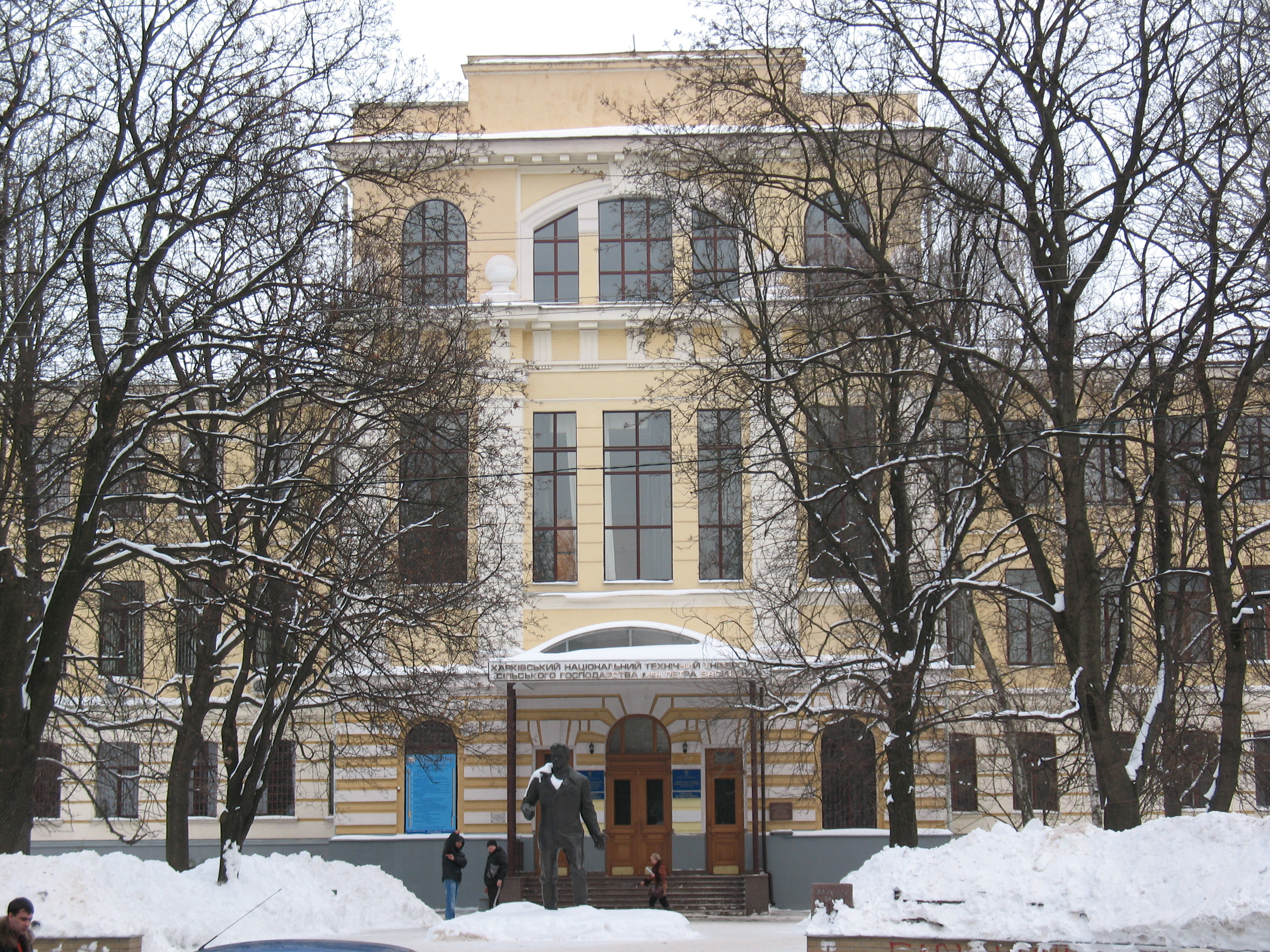
- Type: Public university
- Active: 1930–2021
- Affiliations: Ministry of Education and Science of Ukraine
- Rector: Leonid Tishchenko
- Students: 5700
- Location: Kharkiv, Ukraine
- Campus: 61002 vulytsia Artema, 44
- Website: www.khntusg.com.ua

The Kharkiv Petro Vasylenko National Technical University of Agriculture is a former Ukrainian university in Kharkiv. In 2021 joined the State University of Biotechnology (since 2021).

== Institutes and faculties ==
- The Education and Research Institute of Mechatronics and Management systems (ERI MMS)
- The Education and Research Institute of Electrical engineering and Computer Technologies (ERI EECT)
- The Education and Research Institute of Technical Service (ERI TS)
- The Education and Research Institute of Processing and Food Technologies (ERI PFT)
- The Education and Research Institute of Business and Management (ERI BM)
- The Education and Research Institute of Distance and Correspondence Education (ERI DCE)
- The Education and Research Institute of Post-Diploma Education (ERI PDE)
- KhNTUA College of Processing and Food Industry
- KhNTUA Vovchansk Technical School
- The Technological Research Institute (TRI)
- The Institute of Innovation Management (IIM)
- The Educational Centre for Training and Retraining the Agro-Industrial Complex Specialists

== Awards and reputation ==
According to the All-Ukrainian independent rating "TOP-200 Ukraine" the university is the second among agrarian universities and the 61st among 200 best educational establishments of Ukraine due to the devised and realized innovation "Program of Sustainable Development".

The university was awarded with Honourable Diplomas from Kharkiv Regional Administration, Cabinet of Ministers of Ukraine, and with 1st class ‘Exemplary Educationalist of Agrarian Science" of the Ministry of Agrarian Policy and Foodstuffs of Ukraine for the great contribution in AIC reforms support and training of high quality specialists for agriculture.

== See also ==
List of universities in Ukraine
