= Kyiv Institute of Business and Technology =

Private higher education institution in Kyiv, Ukraine

- Київський інститут бізнесу та технологій
- Type: Private higher education institution
- Established: 1992
- Rector: Olena Yakovleva
- Location: Kyiv, Ukraine
- Website: kibit.edu.ua

Kyiv Institute of Business and Technology (KIBIT; Ukrainian: Київський інститут бізнесу та технологій) is a private higher education institution in Kyiv, Ukraine. According to the Ukrainian state register of education entities, the institution was founded in 1992.

The institute traces its historical background to the Kyiv People's University of Technical Progress, which was created in 1961. In the early 1990s, the institution changed its organizational and legal form, and in 1995 the Kyiv Institute of Business and Technology received a licence from the Ministry of Education and Science of Ukraine to conduct educational activity.

KIBIT provides higher education programmes at bachelor's and master's levels. Its structure also includes the Professional College of Kyiv Institute of Business and Technology, founded in 2010, and the Zhytomyr branch, founded in 2002.
