= Anatoly Kashpirovsky =

Russian psychotherapist and hypnotist (1939–2026)

- Анатолій Кашпіровський; Анатолий Кашпировский
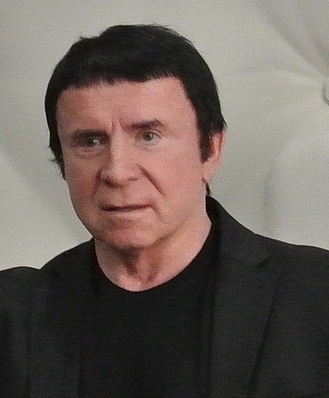
- Kashpirovsky in 2016
- Born: 11 August 1939; Stavnytsia, Kamianets-Podilskyi Oblast, Ukrainian SSR, Soviet Union
- Died: 3 October 2026 (aged 87); Moscow, Russia
- Education: Vinnytsia National Medical University
- Occupation: Psychotherapist
- Website: www.kashpirovskiy.com

Anatoly Mikhailovich Kashpirovsky (Ukrainian: Анатолій Михайлович Кашпіровський, romanized: Anatolii Mykhailovych Kashpirovskyi, Russian: Анатолий Михайлович Кашпировский, 11 August 1939 – 3 October 2026) was a Russian psychotherapist of Ukrainian origin who claimed to be a hypnotist and a psychic healer. He enjoyed great popularity in the Soviet Union in the 1980s, including work with the Soviet Olympic weightlifting team.

In 1989, as the USSR was crumbling, he made a series of broadcasts on Soviet television in which he attempted mass hypnosis at the behest of the government in an effort to subdue the populace. Around 2010 he was again performing mass healing rituals in front of large audiences, although he never returned to his former popularity.

== Early life and career ==
Kashpirovsky was born in Stavnytsia, Ukrainian SSR, USSR on 11 August 1939. In 1962, Kashpirovsky graduated from the Vinnytsia Medical Institute. After this, he worked for 25 years as a psychiatrist in a psychiatric hospital.

In 1989, he became famous after several of his sessions with patients were shown on Soviet television. Among other things, he was shown to allegedly remove the pain of two patients who remained conscious during abdominal surgery by addressing them by teleconferencing. The first session was shown on 9 October 1989 on the Central Channel of the USSR.

In 1993, he was elected a Deputy of the Russian Duma.

== Personal life and death ==
His first wife was Valentina Nikolaevna. They had a son, who became a boxer, and a daughter, Elena (1968–2018), who was a doctor.

His second wife (1992–2014) was Irina.

Shortly before his death, Kashpirovsky became a father with his third wife, Gulizar Chalbashova, who gave birth to their daughter Ellina in August 2025. Kashpirovsky died on 3 October 2026, at the age of 87.
