= List of medical universities in Ukraine =

This list of medical universities in Ukraine includes state education institutions of Ukraine of the third and fourth accreditation levels, such as universities, academies and institutes. The list includes those specializing in medicine, dentistry, nursing and other related medical and health fields.

== Medical universities ==
=== Highest level of accreditation ===
- Bogomolets National Medical University
- Bukovinian State Medical University
- Danylo Halytsky Lviv National Medical University
- Dnipro State Medical University
- Donetsk National Medical University
- International Academy of Ecology and Medicine
- International European University
- Ivano-Frankivsk National Medical University
- Kharkiv Medical Academy of Post-graduate Education
- Kharkiv National Medical University
- Kharkiv International Medical University
- Kyiv Medical University
- Luhansk State Medical University
- Odesa International Medical University
- Odesa National Medical University
- P.L. Shupyk National Medical Academy of Postgraduate Education
- Poltava State Medical and Dental University
  - Poltava State Medical University
- Ternopil National Medical University
- Uzhhorod National Medical University
- Vinnytsia National Medical University. N. I. Pirogov
- Zaporizhzhia Medical Academy of Post-Graduate Education Ministry of Health of Ukraine
- Zaporizhzhia State Medical University

=== Faculty and lower accreditation level ===
- Cherkasy National University
- Petro Mohyla Black Sea National University
- Sumy State University
- Taras Shevchenko National University of Kyiv
- V.N.Karazin Kharkiv National University
- Dnipro Medical Institute of Conventional and Alternative Medicine (III accreditation level)

== See also ==
- List of culture universities in Ukraine
- List of universities in Ukraine
- Open access in Ukraine to scholarly communication
- Institute of Higher Education of NAPS of Ukraine
- Higher education in Ukraine
