= Poltava State Medical and Dental University =

Public medical university in Poltava, Ukraine

Coordinates: 48.3042°N 38.0181°E

- Українська медична стоматологічна академія
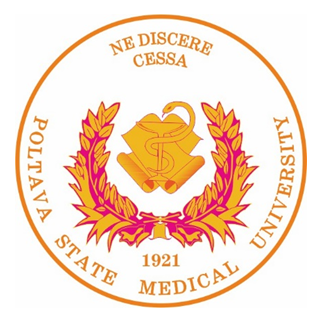
- Motto: Ne discere cessa
- Motto in English: "Never stop learning"
- Established: 1921
- Accreditation: Ministry of Education and Science of Ukraine
- Rector: Vyacheslav Zhdan
- Students: 3,627
- Location: Poltava, Ukraine
- Campus: Urban
- Website: www.pdmu.edu.ua
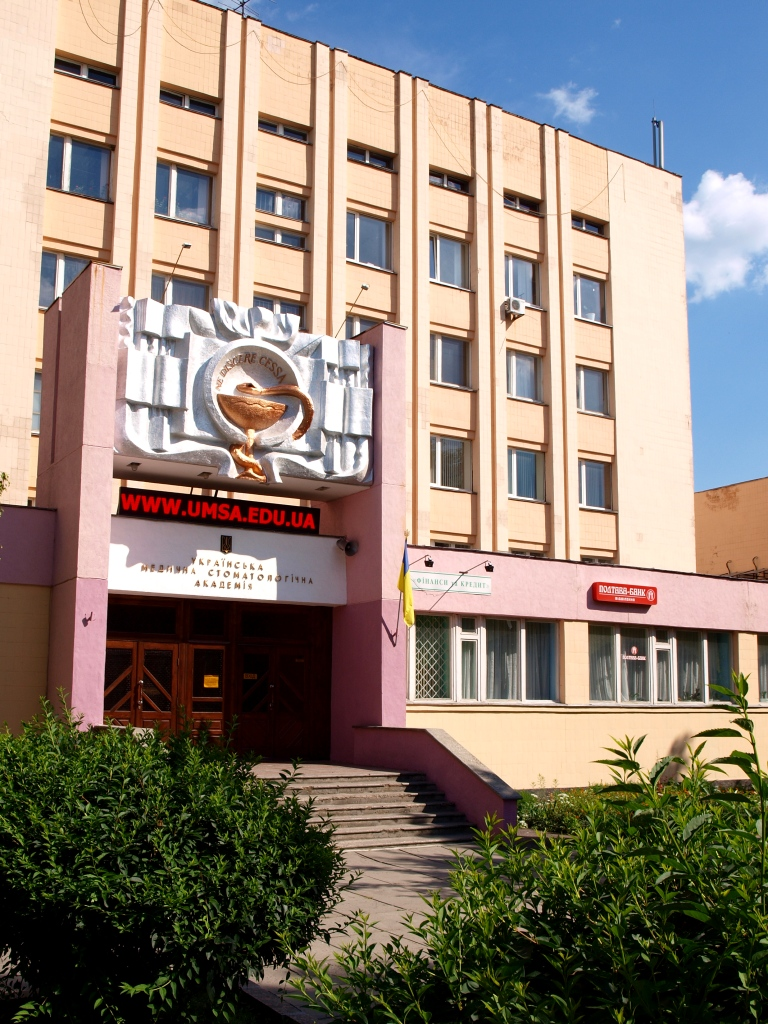

The Poltava State Medical and Dental University, also known as the Ukrainian Medical and Stomatological Academy (abbr. UMSA, Ukrainian: Українська медична стоматологічна академія), is a Ukrainian state-run medical and dental school in Poltava, Ukraine.

== History ==
The university was founded in 1921 by the dental faculty of Kharkiv Medical Academy. In 1967, it moved to the city of Poltava and was renamed the Poltava Ukrainian Medical Stomatological (oral medicine) Academy (PUMSA). In 1992, a Faculty for international students was founded in order to improve the quality of Medical training for foreign citizens. 938 international students from 42 different countries including India, Iraq, Iran, Syria, Morocco, Algeria, Jordan, Pakistan, Libya, Russia, Turkmenistan etc. In 1994, the university received the sixth-highest accreditation level because of its low death rate during surgery and was renamed Poltava State Medical University (PSMU). As of 2004, PSMU had a level-IV accreditation. Poltava State Medical and Dental University is recognized by World Health Organization (WHO), I-MED School, Medical Council of India (MCI), Medical Council of Nepal, PMDC, European Universities Association and lot of other countries.

== Campus ==
PSMU occupies sixteen buildings, including five academic buildings, four dormitories, apartments, a vivarium, hangars, a library, reading rooms, a sports complex, a dining room, a cafe, and a health and sports camp.

== Academics ==
PSMU trains specialists in six faculties and a preparatory department. Specialists are trained in toxicology, pediatrics (six years each), oral surgery, pharmacology (five years each), nursing (two to three years) and orthopedic dentistry (two years).

== Admission requirements ==
Students seeking admission to the first-year medical course should have at least a secondary-school certificate (or twelve years of education) with passing grades in chemistry, physics, biology and English. If English is not the applicant's principal language, he or she must produce an official record of proficiency in English.

Students with a school certificate for ten or eleven years of study need to complete the Premedical Program: a one-year preparatory course. Classes in mathematics, chemistry, physics, biology and English are the basis of this program, which offers students an opportunity to complete their higher secondary schooling. Upon completion, students receive the academy's higher-school diploma and may enroll as first-year medical students.

== See also ==
- List of universities in Ukraine
- List of medical universities in Ukraine
