= Serhii Horokhov =

Russian-Ukrainian politician and businessman (born 1974)

- Сергей Горохов
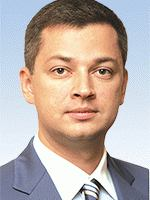
- An official portrait of him from 2012.

People's Deputy of Ukraine
- In office 12 December 2012 – 27 November 2014
- Constituency: Luhansk Oblast, No. 105

Personal details
- Born: Serhii Alexandrovich Horokhov; 20 December 1974 (age 51) Voroshilovgrad, Ukrainian SSR, Soviet Union (now Luhansk, Ukraine)
- Party: Party of Regions (2012-2014)
- Education: Luhansk State Medical University (1998); National Academy for Public Administration (2011)

Serhii Alexandrovich Horokhov (Ukrainian: Сергій Олександрович Горохов; Russian: Сергей Александрович Горохов; born 20 December 1974) is a Russian and formerly Ukrainian politician and businessman who served as a People's Deputy of Ukraine in the Verkhovna Rada representing the 7th convocation from 2012 to its premature end in 2014. During the War in the Donbas, his constituency, which had its seat in the city of Luhansk, came under the control of the pro-Russian, separatist Luhansk People's Republic (LPR). As a result, Horokhov publicly sided with the LPR over Ukraine, and continued his business activities in Luhansk while being put on the wanted list of the Prosecutor General of Ukraine.

== Early life ==
Serhii Alexandrovich Horokhov was born on 20 November 1974 in the city of Voroshilovgrad, in what was then part of the Ukrainian SSR in the Soviet Union. After attending secondary school, he immediately pursued higher education, graduating in 1998 from the Luhansk State Medical University. After his graduation, he began an internship before working as a doctor for the district hospital of Stanytsia-Luhanska Raion. However, he soon quit his medical career and, in 2003, transitioned to business, becoming Manager of Sales and Market Expansion of "Spetsavtomatika", which produces fire and security alarms.

In 2011, he completed an additional degree, a master's in public administration, from the National Academy for Public Administration.

== Business career ==
Starting in 2007, Horokhov became general director of the PJSC "Spetsavtomatika", or as it also became known, "Marshal". Speaking in an interview in 2013, Horokhov said that Marshal held a trading house in Poland and certificates, although it could not sell in Poland. Due to this, around 80% of the company's products were exported to Russia, however, in 2013, with the impending signing of the European Union–Ukraine Association Agreement, the Russians canceled all their orders and made Marshal lose a significant amount of money. In the same interview, Horokhov said he and his staff were against the signing of the agreement because of this. Soon after the declaration of the LPR as a state, in late May 2014, Horokhov became head of the working group that represented businesses still residing in Luhansk. In early 2015, it was reported that the Luhansk Pipeline Valve Plant that he owned was going to be moved out of Luhansk to the Maslovsky industrial park in Voronezh Oblast, Russia. In order to do so, Horokhov created a Russian subsidiary, "VZTA Marshal". It was planned that that the plant would be moved in early 2016 to Russia, with the move and construction of a new plant expected to cost 500 million rubles. At the same time, in September 2015, it was also reported that Horokhov had registered a subsidiary in Kyiv, "Marshal TD", with its director being listed as Andrii Drobyshevsky, the son of Horokhov's business partner, Mykola Drobyshevsky. Marshal TD was listed as a benefactor to the Luhansk State Medical University, his alma mater which had been relocated to Ukrainian-controlled Rubizhne.

Starting in late 2015, it was reported that multiple banks had been unable to collect money from Marshal and one of its subsidiaries, Armatura. The first claim came from the Dniprovskyi District Court in Kyiv, which issued a writ of execution in April 2015 on appeal of Crédit Agricole for 29.5 million rubles. The other bank that claimed money from Marshal was through the Commercial Court of Luhansk Oblast, which ruled for thee claim of Oschadbank bank against Armatura for 4.08 million hryvnias. Despite this, Marshal still continued to operate, even in Ukrainian-controlled territory like Rubizhne and Sievierodonetsk, through related firms like "Spetsokhoronsystema". In spring 2017, Horokhov also became director of the CJSC "Vneshtorgservice", a state-owned company that owned multiple mines and plants, for its Luhansk branch No. 2. In this role, it was reported that he oversaw nearly all the coal assets of the LPR.

== Political career ==
=== Luhansk Oblast Council and elections to the Verkhovna Rada ===
In 2010, Horokhov first entered politics, becoming a deputy to the Luhansk Oblast Council for the Party of Regions. During his time in the council, he advocated for the Russian language in Ukraine, and he heavily approved of the On the Principles of State Language Policy. To support the law, he installed a banner in front of the Verkhovna Rada that read, "My native language is Russian! I support the language bill!" and collected 50,000 signatures from Luhansk residents. He remained in the council for only two years before choosing to run in the national 2012 Ukrainian parliamentary elections for the 7th convocation in constituency No. 105. No. 105 at the time covered parts of the Vergunsky and Kaminobird districts of the city of Luhansk and also a bit of the Novoaidar Raion, including the city of Shchastia. According to the Association of Political Consultants of Ukraine, even before Horokhov actually announced his candidacy, it was widely expected he would and that he would have a high chance of winning due to sympathisers. His main opponent was Maksym Chalenko, the secretary of the Luhansk City Council for the Communist Party of Ukraine. During the election season, Chalenko accused him multiple times of bribery and falsification, and said that Horokhov was unfairly allowed to promote himself much more than candidates from other parties. In the end, despite these accusations, Horokhov won in a majority election at 59.70% of the vote (54,199 people), with Chalenko getting 15.19% of the vote and the third-place candidate, Gennady Tamashev, from UDAR, getting 8.66%.

=== Time in the Rada and Euromaidan ===
During his time in the Rada, Horokhov became Deputy Chairman of the Committee on Industrial and Investment Policy and was initially also a member of the Party of Regions faction. He was sometimes accused of button pushing for absent colleagues of the Party of Regions, including Tariel Vasadze. In October 2013, Horokhov initially voted for all European integration bills, and was one five of the eleven single-mandate deputies in Luhansk Oblast to do so. However, he then opposed the resulting Euromaidan protests when President Viktor Yanukovych refused to sign the European Union–Ukraine Association Agreement. At the start, he refused to condemn the people killed in the protests, and voted for the "laws on dictatorship" which greatly curbed free speech and the rights to protest. In the aftermath, he said he would "defend the interests of Luhansk", and during a rally in Luhansk said that the government was controlled by armed gangs, and that he would not let a revolution by the West happen in Ukraine. Horokhov also said he supported holding an early referendum on the federalisation of Ukraine. In addition, earlier in January, Horokhov also organised a large-scale rally of workers from Marshal, together with Automotorzapchastina, which was owned by Luhansk Oblast Council deputy Andriy Nedoves, in support of Yanukovych. During these rallies, Horokhov and Nedoves called the events in Kyiv a "coup", and together they called on Yanukovych to restore order, even if the implementation would be harsh, including declaring a state of emergency.

=== War in the Donbas and LPR ===
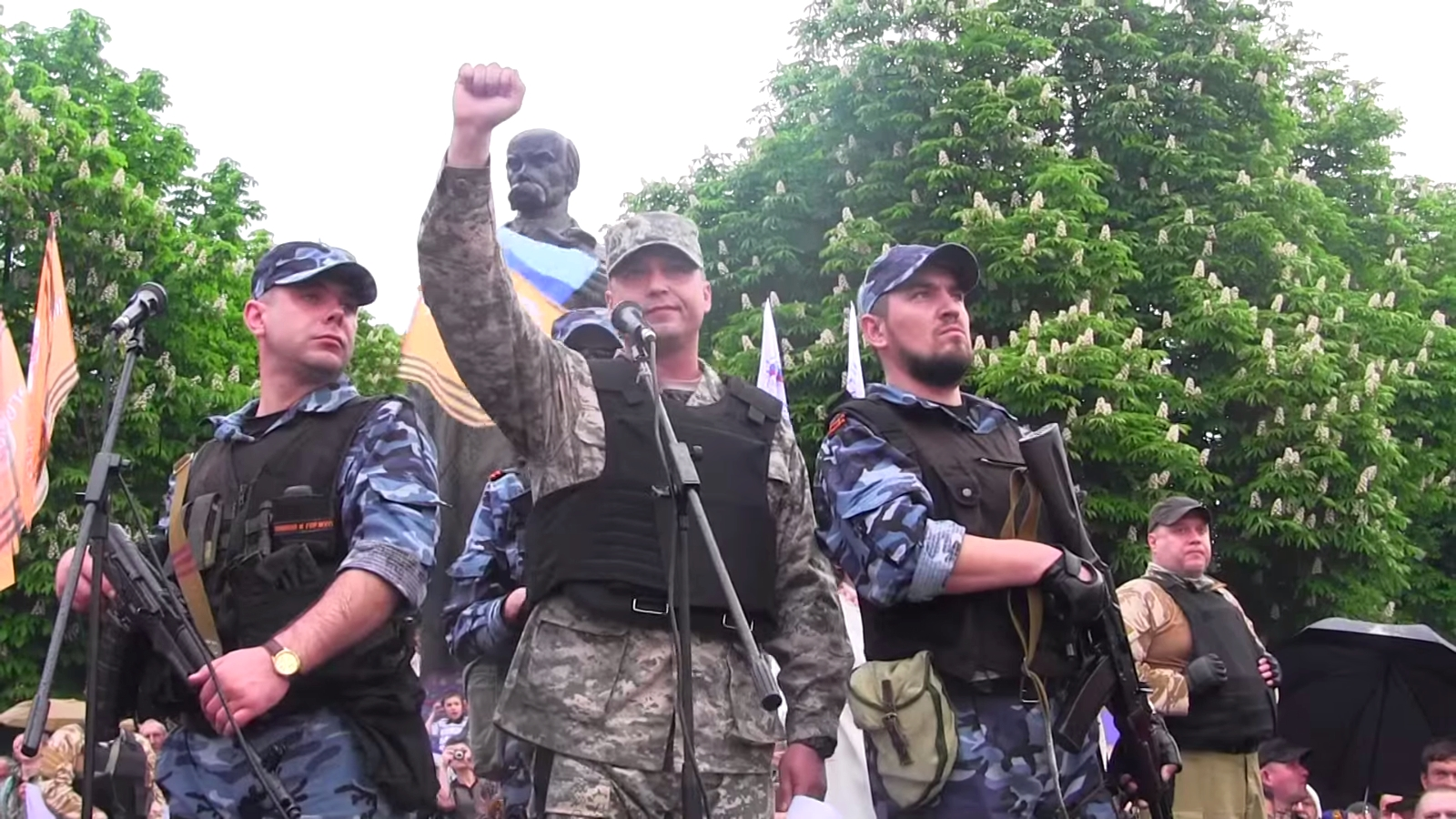
Valery Bolotov proclaiming the act of independence of the self-proclaimed Luhansk People's Republic, 12 May 2014. During these events, Horokhov actively supported the LPR, and intended a people's council organised by Bolotov in May.

As the situation in the Donbas worsened, in April 2014, the Security Service of Ukraine (SBU) building in Luhansk was seized by militants associated with the pro-Russian, separatist Luhansk People's Republic. Initially, Horokhov tried to position himself as a negotiator and said that he opposed the storming of the SBU, but that the government must negotiate with the demands of the militants, including Valery Bolotov, because they "represented the Luhansk region". He also downplayed the motives of the militants, including separatism, and said that they only wanted more local governance and federalisation, including tax control. Eventually, though, Holokhov sided with the LPR, and on 5 May 2014 attended a "people's council" in Luhansk alongside a number of politicians, including Bolotov and Oleh Tsarov. During the people's council, Bolotov announced he would become the de facto governor of Luhansk Oblast and take over the structures of the oblast, in preparation for the 2014 Donbas status referendums, which would de facto legitimise the LPR. After the referendums took place, which were not recognised by any government, the LPR was declared a separate state. Due to his involvement in the referendums and the earlier council, the Prosecutor's Office of Luhansk Oblast announced they would be beginning charges of treason against him, alongside Volodymyr Struk.

A few days later, on 21 May 2014, Horokhov, alongside Oleksandr Yefremov, attended a round table with the Russian State Duma about the situation. Whereas Yefremov ignored the Russian presence in Ukraine at the time and still advocated for some form of federalisation, Horokhov told the Duma that federalisation was no longer possible and called on Russia to directly intervene in the War in the Donbas. He also implied that Russia should possibly annex the Donbas, which was considered a heavily radical position at the time, even for pro-separatist politicians. Despite these statements, he was still technically a member of the Verkhovna Rada, as he had not been expelled yet, and in July he joined the faction "For Peace and Stability". Towards the end of his mandate, in October, he also said that he regretted that the "little green men", masked Russian soldiers who did not wear insignia and participated in the 2014 Russian annexation of Crimea, had not appeared in Luhansk Oblast before the May referendum. At the same time, he confirmed that he would not participate in the snap 2014 Ukrainian parliamentary elections.

== Personal life ==
In 2019, it was confirmed that Horkhov had acquired Russian citizenship. Since November 2022, he had been President of the Boxing Federation of the Luhansk People's Republic after it was de facto annexed into Russia.

== Sources ==
- Казанський, Денис (2020). Як Україна втрачала Донбас [How Ukraine Lost the Donbas]. Книжкове видавництво Чорна гора.
