= List of culture universities in Ukraine =

The list of culture universities in Ukraine includes state education institutions of Ukraine of the 3rd and 4th accreditation levels such as universities, academies, conservatories and institutes. The list only specializes in various schools for arts, music, culture and design.

Most of arts, music and culture educational state institutions are administered by the Ministry of Culture.

== Kyiv ==
- Kyiv National University of theater, cinema and television
- Tchaikovsky National Academy of Music
- National Academy of Visual Arts and Architecture
- Kyiv State Institute of Decorative Applied Arts and Design
- Kyiv National University of Culture and Arts
- Kyiv University of Culture

== Kharkiv Oblast ==
- Kharkiv National Kotlyarevsky University of Arts
- Kharkiv State Academy of Culture
- Kharkiv State Academy of Design and Arts

== Lviv Oblast ==
- Lviv National Music Academy
- Lviv National Academy of Arts

== Odesa Oblast ==
- Odesa Conservatory

== Crimea ==
- Crimean University of Culture, Arts and Tourism

== Luhansk Oblast ==
- Luhansk State Academy of Culture and Arts

== Zakarpattia Oblast ==
- Transcarpathian Academy of Arts

== See also ==
- List of universities in Ukraine
- List of medical universities in Ukraine
- Open access in Ukraine to scholarly communication
- Institute of Higher Education of NAPS of Ukraine
- Higher education in Ukraine
