= Svitlana Rabotenko =

Ukrainian plastic surgeon

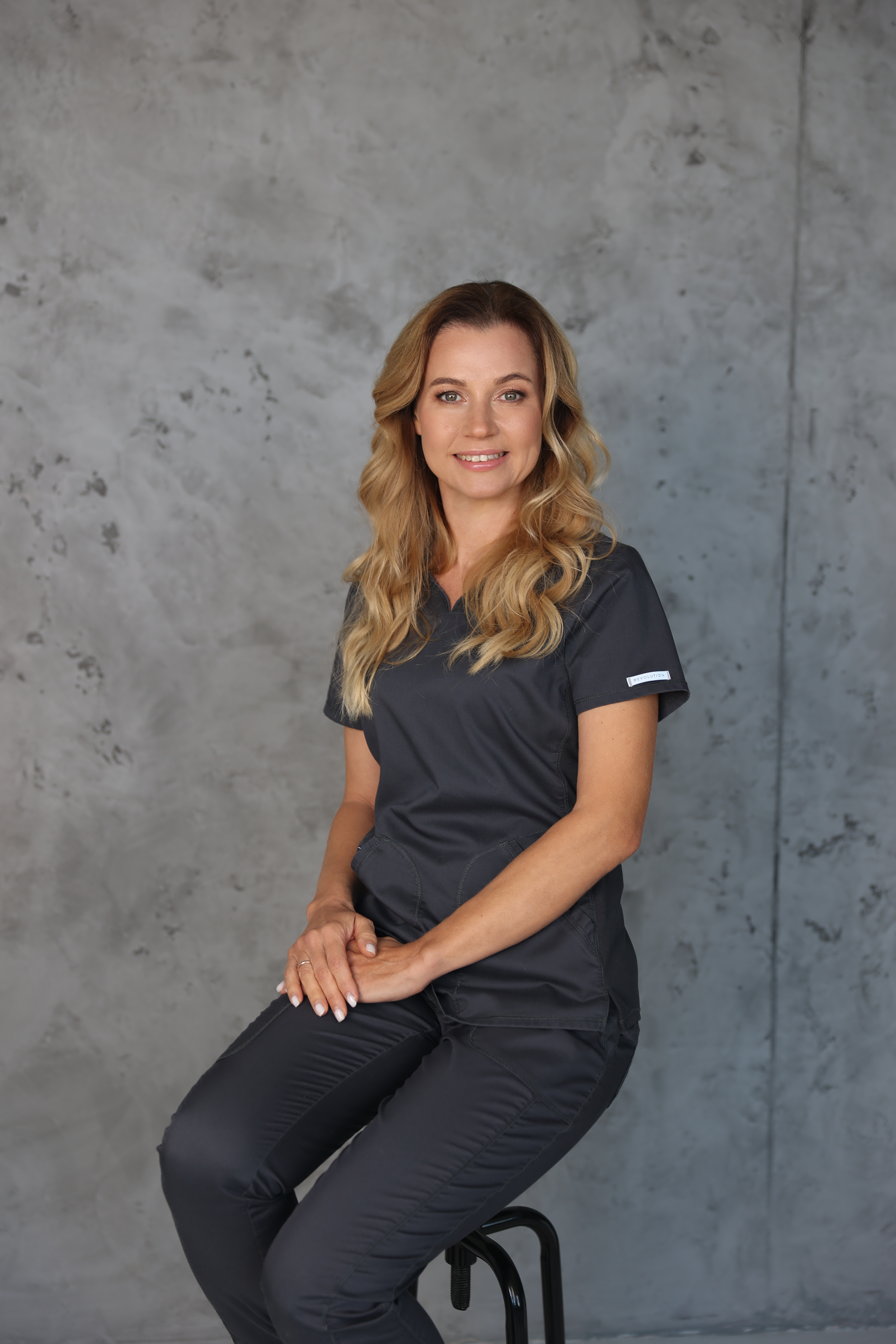
- Born: September 22, 1978 (age 47); Ukraine
- Citizenship: Ukraine
- Education: Zaporizhzhia State Medical University
- Occupations: Plastic surgeon, public health official

Svitlana Anatoliivna Rabotenko (born September 22, 1978) is a Ukrainian plastic surgeon the founder and chief physician of the Vidnova clinic of aesthetic medicine.

== Biography ==
Svitlana Rabotenko was born on September 22, 1978, in Ukraine. She attended Zaporizhzhia State Medical University, graduating with honors in 2001 with a degree in General Medicine. Between 2001 and 2003, she completed her internship in surgery at the same institution.

From 2003 to 2008, she worked as a surgeon in the surgical department of the Zaporizhzhia Central District Hospital. Since 2009, she has been a plastic surgeon and head of the plastic and reconstructive surgery department at the Dniprorudny City Hospital.

== Professional career ==
Later, Svitlana Rabotenko focused her practice on aesthetic surgery and became the chief physician of the Plastic Surgery department at VIDNOVA Clinic. She performs over 30 types of surgeries, with a focus on endoscopic techniques that utilize small incisions in the scalp to lift deep tissue layers of the forehead and mid-face while minimizing visible scarring. In collaboration with the VIDNOVA Clinic, she developed "FACE UP," a proprietary rejuvenation method that integrates surgical and cosmetic procedures for personalized facial results.

== International activity ==
Rabotenko has participated in several international medical forums, including the European Society of Plastic, Reconstructive and Aesthetic Surgery congress (2009), the ISAPS World Congress (2018, 2023, 2025), and specialized workshops in Istanbul, Rome, and Stockholm. Her professional contributions include presentations at the 2025 ICAMPS and Breast Geneity conferences, where she lectured on endoscopic facelifts and axillary access for breast surgery.

In 2024, she was elected Vice President of the Eastern European Division of ISAPS, becoming the first representative of Ukraine in a leadership position within the organization.

== Professional memberships ==
- International member of the American Society of Plastic Surgeons (ASPS)
- International member of the International Society of Aesthetic Plastic Surgery (ISAPS)
- Member of the All-Ukrainian Association of Plastic, Reconstructive, and Aesthetic Surgeons (VAPREH)

== Personal life ==
Rabotenko is married and has three children.
