= Ua University =

Ukrainian Admission Center "UA University"
- Український Приймальний Центр; УПЦ
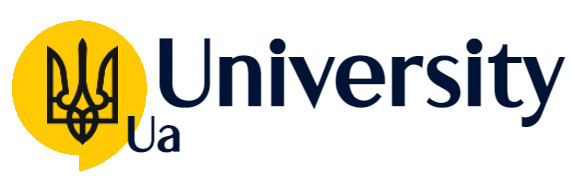

Agency overview
- Formed: May 14, 2006
- Jurisdiction: Ukraine
- Headquarters: Nauki Avenue 40, 64, Kharkiv
- Employees: 24
- Website: Official website

The UA University (Ukrainian: Український Приймальний Центр) is the official Ukrainian organization founded with support of Ministry of Education and Science of Ukraine. Meanwhile, UA University is a private company and a part of NAUKAUA LLC.

== History ==
On April 11, 2006, it was decided to create international organization that will helps international students with admission and education abroad. After analyzing the situation, it was revealed that students experience difficulties when entering abroad. This is primarily due to the fake agents. The new organization should resolve this problem. The Ukrainian Admission Center was launched on a test mode. A year later, after the analysis of it work, similar centers will be launched in several other countries: Russia, Belarus, Georgia and Poland, Perhaps in Hungary, Cyprus, Kazakhstan

UA University was founded on 14 May 2006. In first month of work there was more than 1500 applications from foreign students.

Since January 2007 Ukrainian Admission Center works in normal mode, and is listed on the Ukrainian Stock Exchange (PFTS), and the agency is 50% owned by Ukrainian universities.

== Structures ==
The center consists of the central body with headquarter in Kharkiv and offices in the largest universities in regional centers:

- Kyiv
- Vinnytsia
- Dnipro
- Zhytomyr
- Zaporizhia
- Ivano-Frankivsk
- Lutsk
- Lviv
- Mykolaiv
- Odesa
- Poltava
- Rivne
- Sumy
- Ternopil
- Kharkiv
- Kherson

== See also ==
- Ministry of Education and Science of Ukraine
- Cabinet of Ministers of Ukraine
- Higher education in Ukraine
- List of universities in Ukraine
