= Odesa International Medical University =

Medical university in Odesa, Ukraine

Coordinates: 46.4939°N 30.7264°E

- Одеський Міжнародний Медичний Університет

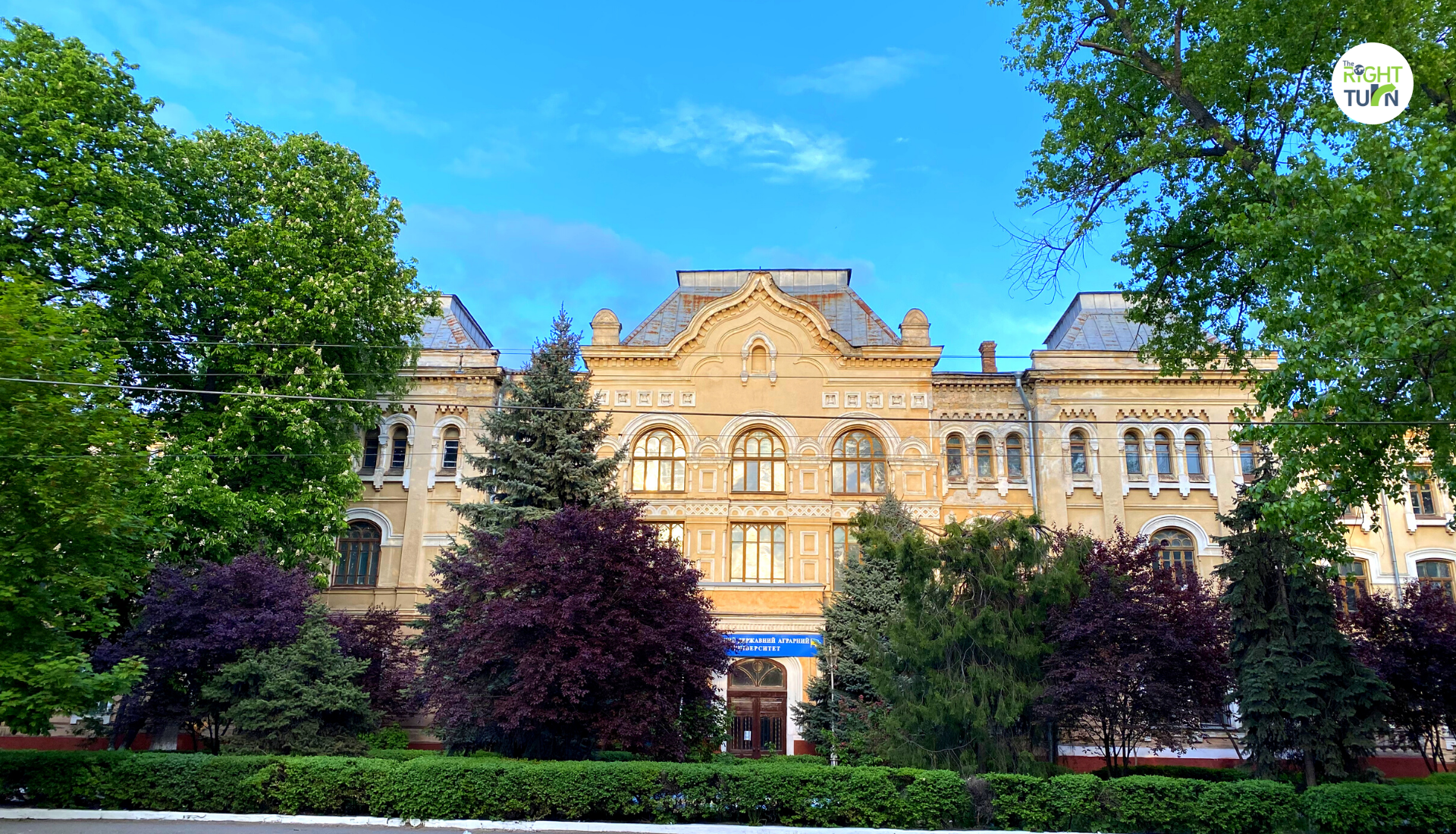
- Kanatna St. 99, Odesa; Odesa, 65000; Ukraine

Information
- Other name: OIMU
- Type: International research medical school
- Established: 1999
- Category: Medical University
- Session: September/January
- Staff: 870
- Faculty: 34 Medical Faculties
- Teaching staff: 455
- Enrollment: 12500 in year of 2020
- Language: English / Ukrainian / French / German
- Classrooms: 115
- Campuses: 3
- Campus type: Government Building
- Accreditation: Ministry of Education and Science of Ukraine
- USNWR ranking: 9th Top Medical School In Ukraine (2020 Ranking)
- School fees: 3900$ Yearly Tuition For Medicine (MBBS)
- Graduates: 3345
- Affiliations: Ministry of Health of Ukraine, European Medical Council, WHO
- Website: oimu.edu.ua

The Odesa International Medical University (Ukrainian: Одеський Міжнародний Медичний Університет, ОММУ, abbr. OIMU) is a Ukrainian higher educational institution located in Odesa.

The university offers undergraduate, postgraduate and doctoral programs with a strong emphasis on medical specialties like general medicine (MD/MBBS), somatology (Dentistry), nursing, pharmacy, veterinary medicine, biomedical engineering and agricultural engineering.

All medical degrees of the university issued for foreign graduates are recognized and listed in the International Medical Education Directory (IMED), World Health Organization (WHO), Medical Council of Europe, General Medical Council (limited registration) of UK, Pakistan Medical & Dental Council (PMDC), Medical Council of Nigeria and other African countries as well.

== Schools and departments ==
Odesa International Medical University has the following six schools and 228 clinical and 76 theoretical departments as well as 11 clinical and health care centres and a Research Institute of Traumatology and Orthopedics.

- School of Medicine
- School of Dentistry
- School of Nursing
- School of Pharmacy
- School of Postgraduation & Specialization
- School of Foreign Languages

== Clinical centres and affiliated hospitals ==
The university is affiliated with the following hospitals and clinical centres in Odesa.

- Perinatal Odesa Center
- Odesa Territory. Medical Health Association of the Child and Women
- Odesa City Hospital No.1
- Odesa City Hospital No.2
- Health Code Health Center
- Medical clinic “Medifast”
- Medical center “Adastra”
- Medical Center “AS Medikal”
- Dental Clinic “Doctor”
- Medical Rehabilitation Center “T-MEDIL”
- Health Clinic “Plus”

== Programs ==
Odesa International Medical University offers the following programs to its domestic and international students:

Program	Degree awarded
Medicine - MD/MBBS	Masters
Dentistry - BDS	Masters
Surgery	Masters & Specialization
Orthopedic Dentistry	Specialization
Pediatric Dentistry	Specialization
Radiology	Masters & Specialization
Surgical Dentistry	Specialization
Pathology	Specialization
Psychiatry	Masters & Specialization
Medical Psychology	Masters
Pharmacy, Industrial Pharmacy	Bachelors, Masters & Specialization
Medical & Psychological Rehabilitation	Masters
Gynaecology	Specialization
Nursing	Bachelors & Masters
Medical Diagnostics & Treatment Technologies	Bachelors
Laboratory Diagnostics	Bachelors
Pediatrics	Specialization

== Blacklisting in the UK ==
Medical degrees obtained from Odesa International Medical University have recently been blacklisted by the British General Medical Council (GMC). Blacklisting is based on information that shows the qualification doesn't meet the GMC's criteria, such as questionable ethics, teaching and integrity of the medical programme, including examinations and medical rotations being inadequate or simply lied about.

The GMC said "We only place a medical school on this list once we have carried out a full investigation and concluded that it is the most appropriate course of action." It recommended that British students looking to return to their home country following graduation avoid this university at all costs.

== See also ==
List of medical universities in Ukraine
