= Zaporizhzhia Medical Academy of Post-Graduate Education Ministry of Health of Ukraine =

Ukrainian medical training institute

Coordinates: 47.87146°N 35.07450°E

State Institution 'Zaporizhzhia Medical Academy of Post-Graduate Education, Ministry of Health of Ukraine'
- Державний заклад «Запорізька медична академія післядипломної освіти Міністерства охорони здоров’я України»
- Established: May 15, 1926
- Accreditation: Ministry of Education and Science of Ukraine
- Affiliations: Ministry of Health of Ukraine
- Rector: Oleksandr Nikonenko
- Location: Zaporizhzhia, Ukraine
- Campus: Suburban
- Website: www.zmapo.edu.ua

The Zaporizhzhia Medical Academy of Post-Graduate Education, Ministry of Health of Ukraine is the institution of higher education with IV level of accreditation, operates on the basis of state ownership. It reports to the Ministry of Healthcare of Ukraine.

== History ==
In 1926 the Board of the People Commissariat of Health Care of Ukraine made the decision to open a clinical institute of advanced training of doctors in the city of Odesa. In order to bring qualified medical personnel to the industrial centers of the country in 1955, the institution was transferred to the city of Zaporizhzhia.

By the Order of Cabinet of Ministry of Ukraine from 26.11.2003 No.704-r Zaporizhzhia State Institute of Advanced Training of Doctors was reorganized in Zaporizhzhia Medical Academy of Post-Graduate Education (since 2011 - State Institution Zaporizhzhia Medical Academy of Post-Graduate Education Ministry of Health of Ukraine).

From the first years of foundation at institute therapeutic and surgical faculties worked. On execution of the State program of reforming of primary medic and sanitary help to the population on bases of the general practice / family medicine in 2002 the faculty of family medicine was opened. Today in academy three faculties function: therapeutic, surgical and faculty of family medicine which unite 26 departments on which preparation of doctors on 62 base medical specialties (disciplines) in the direction 1201 "Medicine" are carried out.

In SI Zaporizhzhia Medical Academy of Post-Graduate Education Ministry of Health of Ukraine the Institute of cardiovascular surgery and transplantology, and also scientific research institute of eye diseases work. Strategy of activity of SI ZMAPO Ministry of Health of Ukraine is ensuring quality of the higher education, preservation of achievements and traditions of the Ukrainian medical school, integration into world system of the higher education. The academy has considerable cultural traditions and executes mission of the center of professional development of doctors in the Zaporizhzhia region, and reproduction of intellectual potential of the country.

== Institutes and faculties ==
Institute of cardiovascular surgery and transplantology (2003)

Research institute of eye diseases (2006)

== Chancellors ==
- 1955-1963 – Professor Karpuhin Vasiliy Timofeevich
- 1963-1979 – Professor Chulkov Nikolay Zinov’evich
- 1979-1992 – Honored worker of the higher school, Professor Shershnev Vladimir Georgievich
- 1992-1993 – Professor Polivoda Sergey Nikolaevich
- 1993-2002 – Professor Portus Roman Mihaylovich
- 2002–present – academician of National Academy of Medical sciences, corresponding member of National Academy of Sciences of Ukraine, Honored Scientist of Ukraine, Laureate of the State Prize of Ukraine, doctor of medical sciences, Professor Nikonenko Oleksandr Semenovich.

== Honorable doctors and famous alumni ==
Among scientists of the academy there is one academician of NAMS of Ukraine, the corresponding member of NAS of Ukraine, 10 Honored workers of a science and equipment of Ukraine and the Deserved doctors

== Awards and reputation ==
On the State rating of MH of Ukraine (2000-2002) the academy took leader (ІІ-ІІІ) places among medical (pharmaceutical) schools of Ukraine in the nomination "personnel policy". Chancellor and collective of academy took Diplomas of State Ukrainian project @The Best Medical Schools of Ukraine (2007), National medical prize (2011) etc.

== See also ==
- List of universities in Ukraine
- List of medical universities in Ukraine
