= National Pirogov Memorial Medical University =

Public medical university in Vinnytsia, Ukraine

National Pirogov Medical University
- ДЗВО "Вінницький національний медичний університет імені М.І.Пирогова"
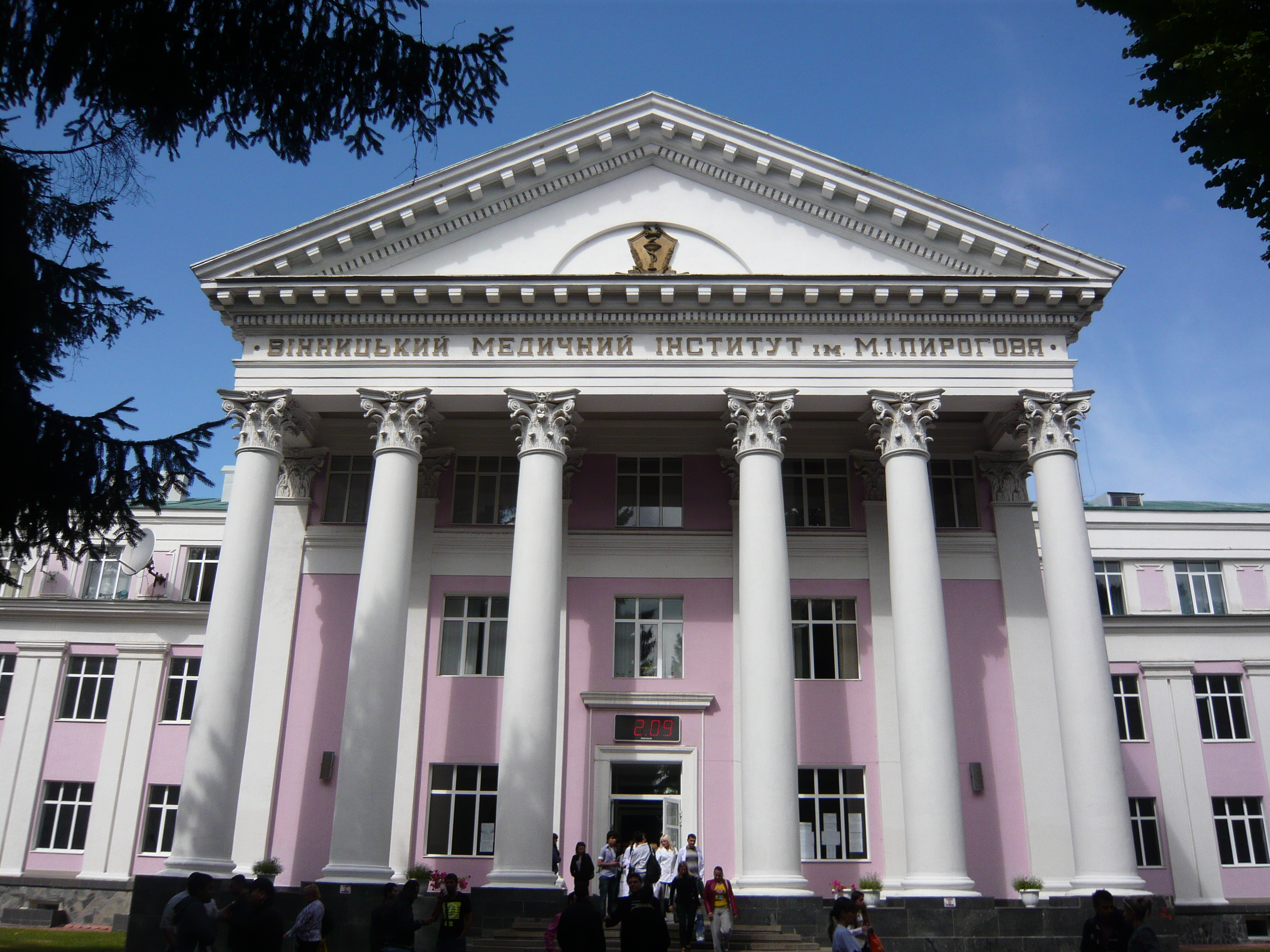
- University main building
- Other names: VNMU
- Former names: Vinnytsia Pharmaceutical Institute (1921); Vinnytsia Branch of the All-Ukrainian Institute of Correspondence Medical Education (1930); Vinnytsia Evening Industrial Medical Institute (1932); Vinnytsia Medical Institute (1934)
- Type: IV accreditation, National medical university
- Established: 1921
- Accreditation: Ministry of Education and Science of Ukraine
- Rector: Viktoriia Petrushenko
- Location: Pyrohova St, 56, Vinnytsia, 21018, Ukraine; 49.2279°N 28.446°E
- Campus: Urban
- Language: English, Ukrainian
- Website: Official website

The National Pirogov Medical University is a medical state-sponsored university in Vinnytsia, Ukraine founded in 1921. In 1960 the institute was named after Nikolai Pirogov, in 1984 it was awarded the Order of the Badge of Honour. Since 1994, Vinnytsia Medical Institute has been certified and accredited by IV level of accreditation as a university. In 2002, the university acquired national status. Viktoriia Viktorivna Petrushenko, Doctor of Science, Professor, and famous surgeon is rector of the university.

== Faculties ==
- Faculty of Postgraduate Education
- Preparatory faculty for foreign nationals
- Faculty of Pharmacy (Pharmacy, Clinical Pharmacy);
- Faculty of Dentistry;
- Faculty of Medicine No. 1 (Medical Affairs);
- Faculty of Medicine No. 2 (Pediatrics, Medical Psychology);
- Center for New Information Technologies (computer classes, television studio, printing house, computer printing department, own web-server);
- Research Center comprising 7 research laboratories and an experimental clinic (vivarium);
- Library, 6 licensed laboratories.
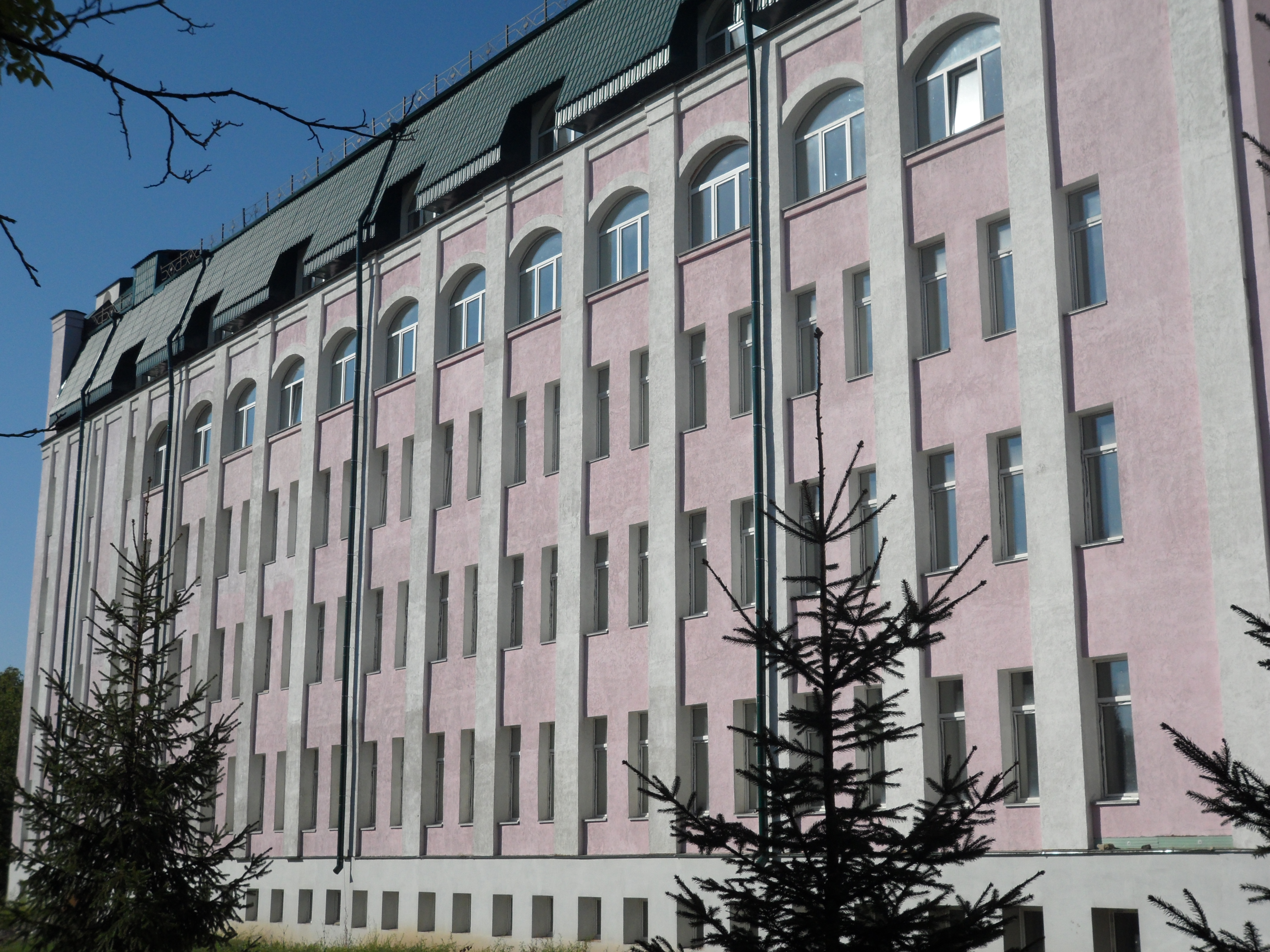
  Library Building

== Training at faculties ==
There are 6 faculties: two medical (No. 1 and No. 2), training in the specialties of general medicine, pediatrics, medical psychology; dental − specialty dentistry; pharmaceutical − specialty pharmacy and clinical pharmacy; The Faculty of Postgraduate Education provides various forms of postgraduate training for doctors in 33 specialties. Correspondence training of pharmacists are organized at the Faculty of Pharmacy.

As of September 2016 among the structural units of the university there are 60 departments of clinical and theoretical profile. The university has 1730 employees, of which 1036 are scientific and pedagogical staff, including 119 doctors of sciences, 612 candidates of sciences, 88 professors, 344 associate professors.

== History ==
In 1960 the name of Nikolay Pirogov was given to the educational institution. In 1984, the institution was awarded the Order of the Badge of Honour. In 1994 the Vinnytsia Medical Institute was certified and accredited according to the IV level of accreditation, granted university status. National University was acquired in 2002. In the same year the university was awarded with certificates of honor by the Cabinet of Ministers of Ukraine and the Verkhovna Rada of Ukraine.

Since the acquisition of the status of university, the dental and pharmaceutical faculties were equipped with modern teaching staff, 10 new departments were opened at the medical, pharmaceutical, dental and postgraduate faculties.

According to many indicators of activity in the ratings of the Ministry of Health of Ukraine, the university has been in the leading position for many years.

== Teaching staff ==
The teaching staff consists of 645 people, including 89 doctors of sciences, 385 candidates of sciences, 69 professors, 248 associate professors, and 172 teachers.

The staff of scientific and pedagogical employees of the research center – 13 people, including doctors of sciences – 1, candidates of sciences – 10, without a scientific degree – 2.

Training of students, postgraduate training of doctors are organized at 54 departments, 44 of them are headed by doctors of sciences, professors. At 48 departments there is a personnel reserve for the position of the head of the department.

The Rector's Office carries out purposeful work on the preparation of the personnel reserve from among the best graduates who have proven themselves capable of scientific work during their student years and have completed master's and postgraduate studies. Every year teachers defend 4-6 doctoral and 30-35 candidate dissertations. In 2005, 6 doctoral and 45 candidate dissertations were defended.

The President of Ukraine, the Chairman of the Verkhovna Rada of Ukraine, the Ministers of education and health, the President of the Academy of Medical Sciences of Ukraine, have twice got acquainted with the experience of the university.

Since 1961, the university has been training foreign nationals. More than 5,000 foreigners from 98 countries have completed various forms of training. As of January 1, 2006, 834 foreign citizens provide various forms of training at the university.

== Departments ==
=== Departments of theoretical profile ===
- Department of Human anatomy
- Department of Biochemistry and General chemistry
- Department of Histology
- Department of Hygiene and Ecology
- Department of Foreign Languages
- Department of Microbiology
- Department of Emergency and Military Medicine
- Department of Medical Biology
- Department of Biophysics, Informatics and medical equipment
- Department of Human Physiology
- Department of Operative Surgery and Clinical Anatomy
- Department of Pathological Physiology
- Department of Social Medicine and Organization of public health services
- Department Ukrainian language and culture
- Department of Physical training
- Department of Philosophy and Social Sciences
- Department of Pharmacology
- Department of Pharmaceutical chemistry
- Department of Pharmacy

=== Departments of clinical profile ===
- Department of Obstetrics and Gynecology №1
- Department of Obstetrics and Gynecology №2
- Department of Anesthesiology and Intensive Care
- Department of Internal medicine of medical faculty №2
- Department of Internal medicine №1
- Department of Internal medicine №2
- Department of Internal medicine №3
- Department of Internal and family medicine
- Department of Pediatric infection Diseases
- Department of Pediatric Surgery
- Department of Endocrinology
- Department of General Surgery
- Department of Infection Diseases
- Department of Pathological Anatomy
- Department of Forensic Medicine and Law
- Department of Clinical Pharmacy and Clinical Pharmacology
- Department of Medical Psychology and Psychiatry
- Department of Medical Rehabilitation and Medical Social Expertise
- Department of Endoscopic and Cardiovascular Surgery
- Department of Neurology with Neurosurgery
- Department of Oncology, X-ray diagnostics and Therapy
- Course of radiology
- Department of Orthopedics and Traumatology
- Department of Prosthetic Stomatology
- Department of Otorhinolaringology
- Department of Ophthalmology
- Department of Pediatric №1
- Department of Pediatric №2
- Department of Propedeutics of Internal Medicine
- Department of Propedeutics of Pediatric Diseases with Patient Care
- Department of Psychiatry
- Department of Pediatric Stomatology
- Department of Therapeutical Stomatology
- Department of Phthisiatry
- Department of Surgery of Medicine faculty №2
- Department of Surgery №1
- Course of Urology
- Department of Surgery №2
- Course of Basic Stomatology
- Department of Surgical Stomatology
- Department of Skin and Veneral Diseases

== Priority areas of research ==
- protection of motherhood and childhood (prevention of morbidity, disability and mortality among women and children, creation and implementation of new methods of diagnosis, treatment, rehabilitation and study of pathogenetic mechanisms of perinatal pathology and risk factors);
- prevention, diagnosis, treatment and rehabilitation of chronic diseases among different groups of the population (cardiovascular pathology, pathology of the digestive, respiratory, genitourinary system, nervous system, allergic diseases, etc.);
- creation, carrying out of experimental researches and introduction of new medicines, devices and devices.

Particular attention is paid to the implementation of basic research, namely:

- study of anthropological, genetic, physiological and psychological characteristics of the body of people of different ages (from neonatal to elderly) in order to determine markers of multifactorial diseases;
- determining the patterns of morphogenesis and pathomorphosis of diseases of various origins in order to develop and improve technologies for secondary prevention;
- development of modern treatment and prevention technologies.

In addition to cathedral teams, in the implementation of these areas of research are actively involved:

- Research center with a laboratory of functional morphology and genetics of development and a research and experimental clinic;
- Center for New Information Technologies;
- Laboratory of Experimental Neurophysiology;
- Experimental pharmacological laboratory;
- Clinical-diagnostic allergological laboratory;
- Clinical and diagnostic gastroenterological laboratory;
- Bacteriological laboratory;
- Laboratory of Experimental Cardiology.

These scientific laboratories have been accredited and received the appropriate certificates.

== International cooperation ==
The university maintains close relations and cooperates with medical faculties of 19 foreign countries (including the U.S., Germany, France, England, etc.), and clinical departments have close ties with 28 foreign pharmaceutical firms. Departments’ teaching staff are involved in the implementation of 72 international projects.

== Notable alumni ==
Ajmal Ameer, Indian Actor

== Gallery ==
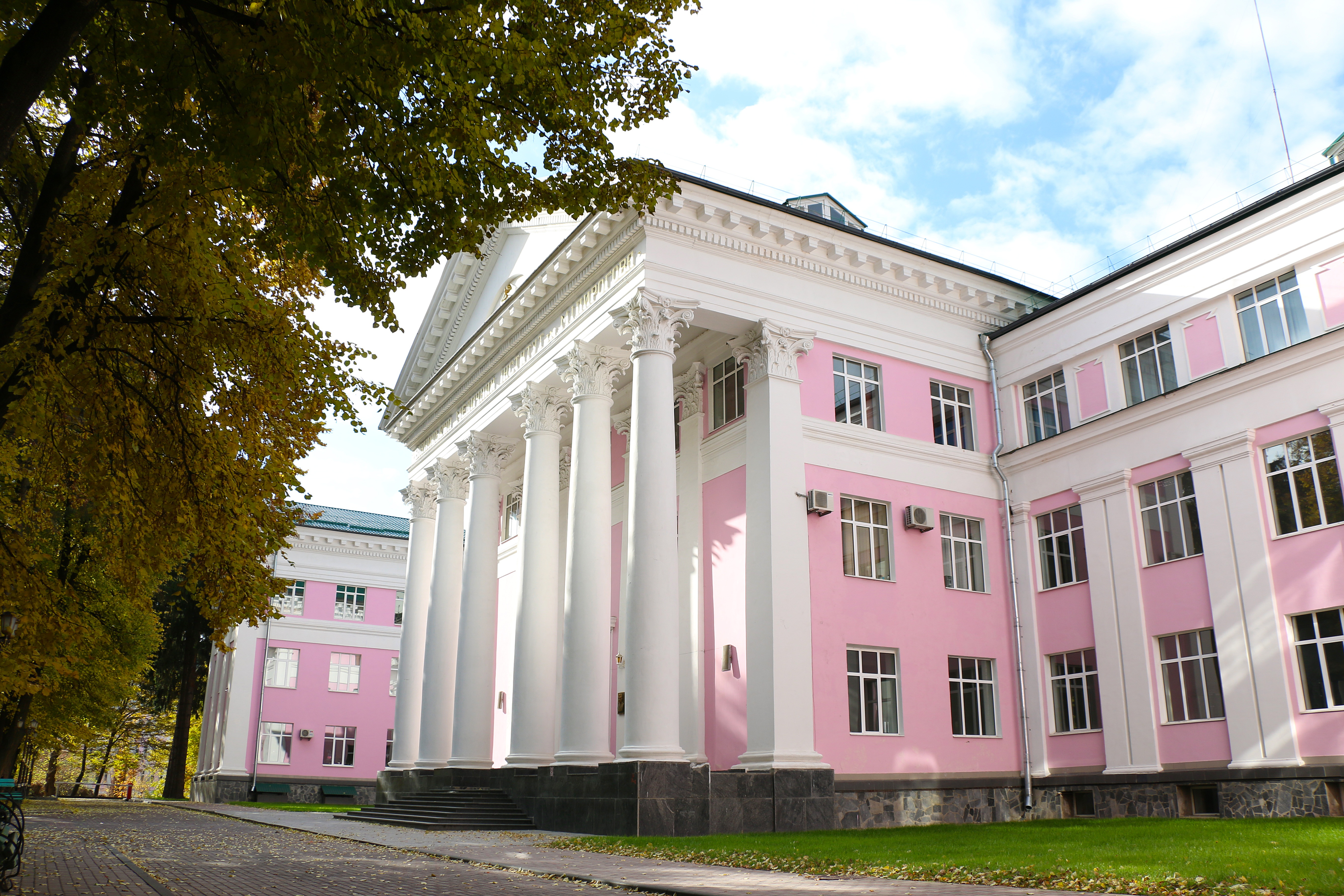
VNMU during Autumn

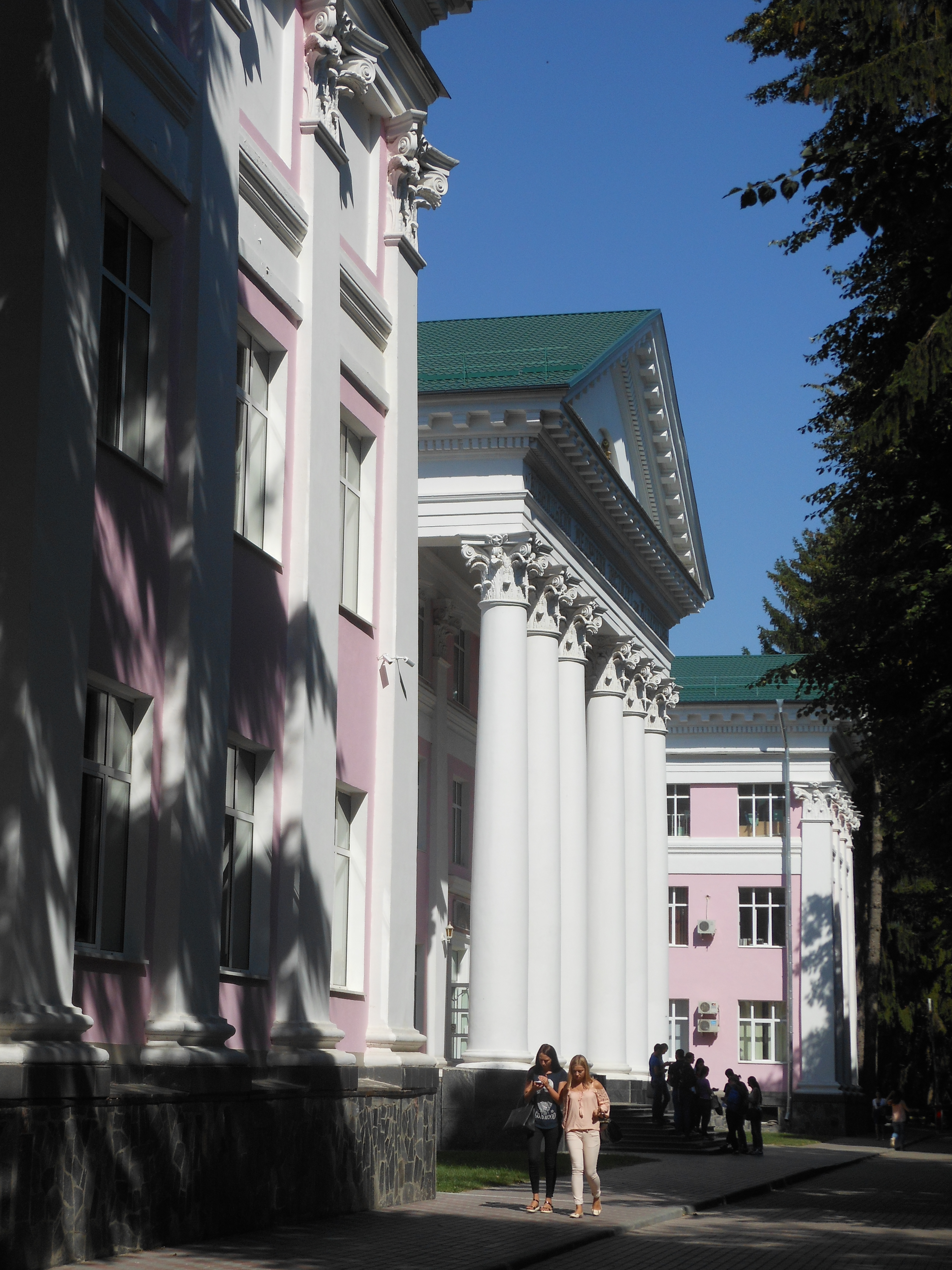
VNMU

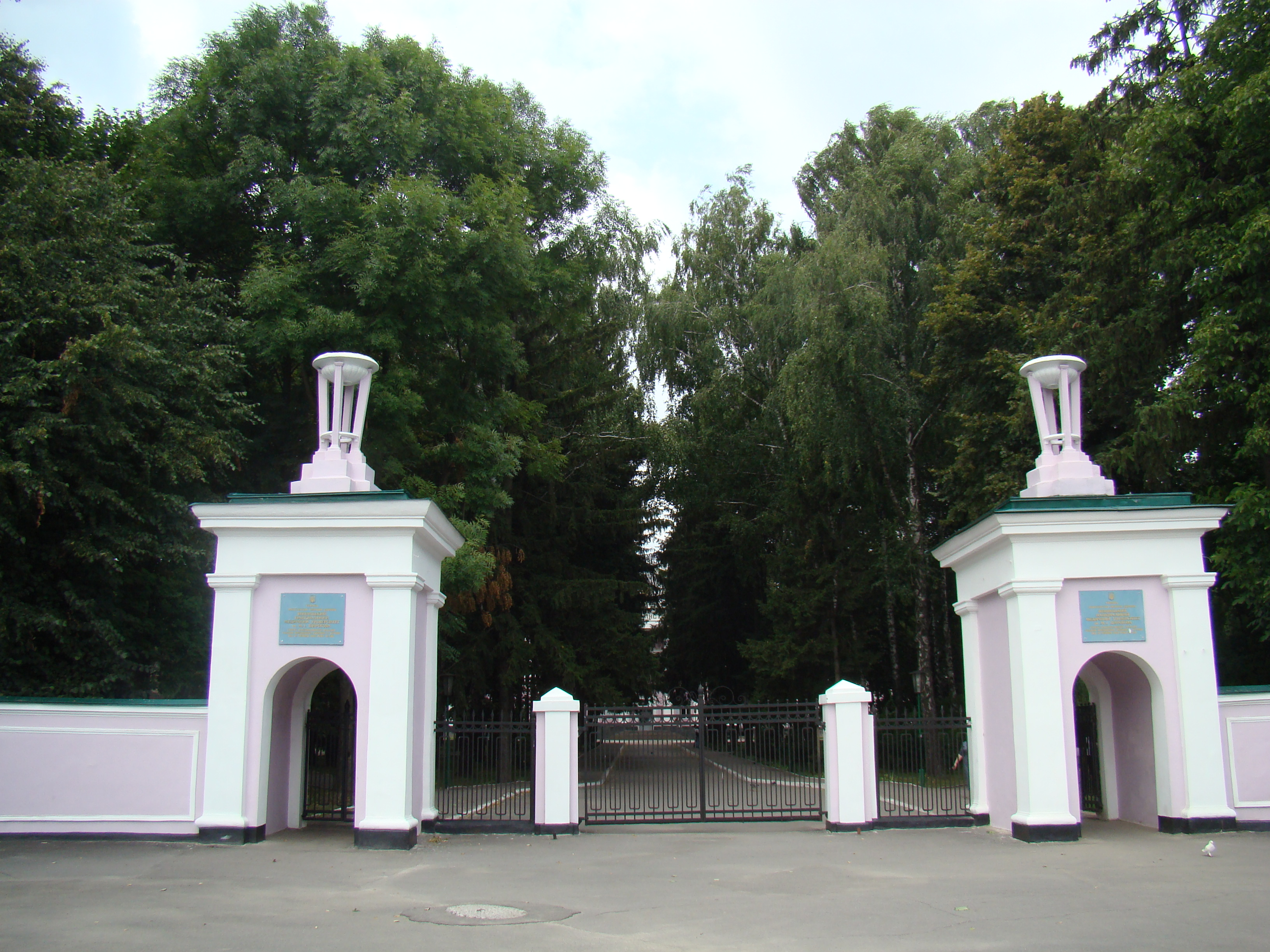
Front gate

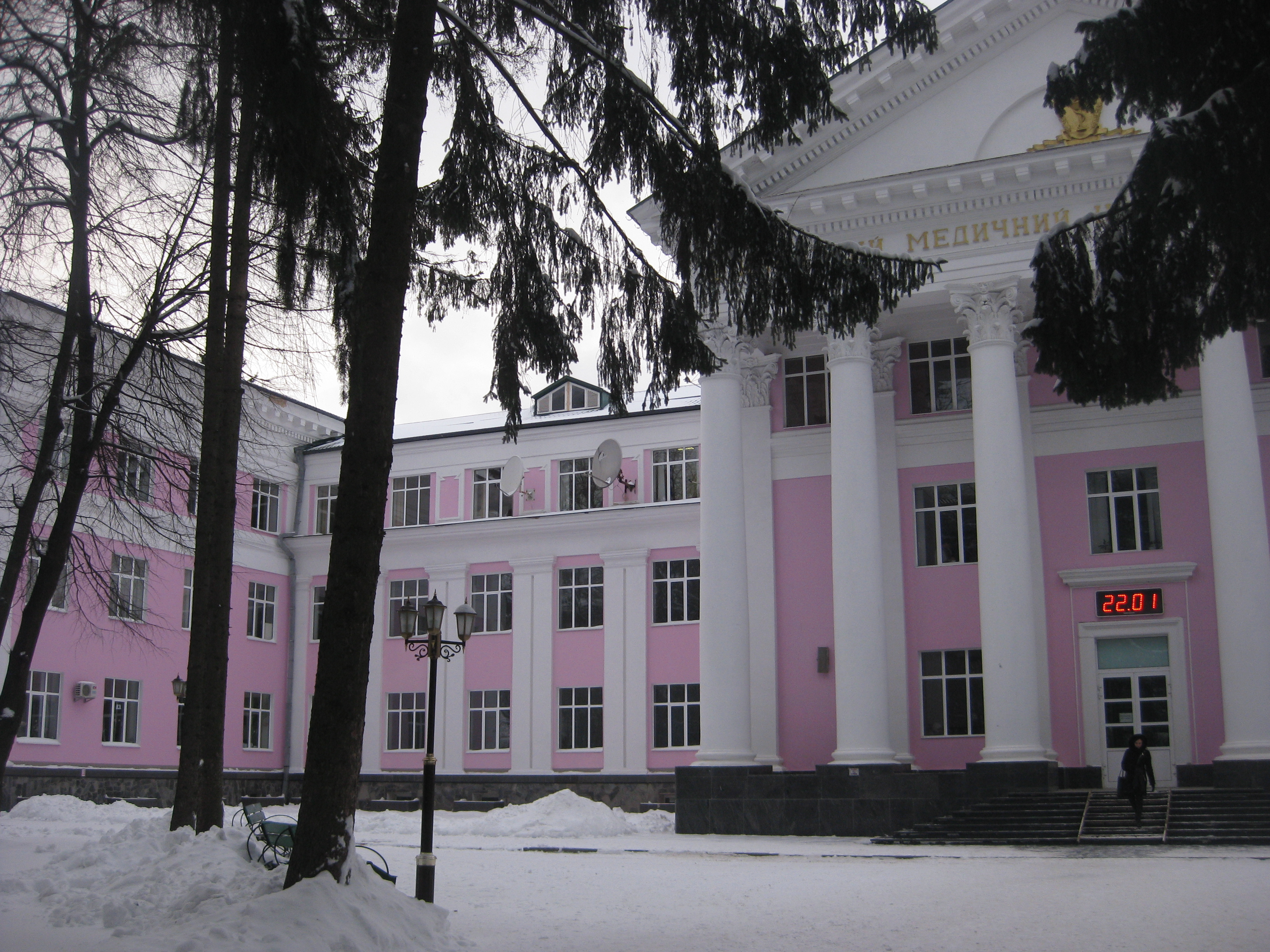
During winter

VNMU

== See also ==
- List of universities in Ukraine
- List of medical universities in Ukraine
