= Higher education in Ukraine =

Higher education in Ukraine operates several levels, all of which are regulated by the Ministry of Education and Science of Ukraine. In early 2016, Ukraine had 802 universities, but the Ministry intends to lower that number to 317. Ukraine had 1,586,700 higher education students in 2016-17.

For specific universities, see the List of universities in Ukraine.

== Brief historical survey ==
The first higher education institutions (HEIs) emerged in Ukraine during the late 16th and early 17th centuries under the Kingdom of Poland.

- The first was the Ostrozka School, or Ostrozkiy Greek-Slavic-Latin Collegium, similar to Western European higher education institutions of the time. Established in 1576 in the town of Ostrog, the Collegium was the first higher education institution in the Eastern Slavic territories but was closed in 1636, when it was replaced by the Jesuit College in Ostrog.
- The Kyiv Mohyla Academy was established in 1632 and in 1694 officially recognized by the government of Imperial Russia as a higher education institution. It operated until 1819, when it was transformed into the Kiev Theological Academy. The National University of Kyiv Mohyla Academy, refounded in 1991, draws on this history.
- The oldest continuous higher education institution in Ukraine is the Lviv University, which began as the Jesuit Collegium with a royal charter in 1661 and has continued since then under different names and authorities.

More higher education institutions were set up in the 19th century, beginning with universities in Kharkiv (1805), Kyiv (1834), Odesa (1865), and Chernivtsi (1875) and a number of professional higher education institutions, e.g., the Nizhyn Historical and Philological Institute (originally established as the Gymnasium of Higher Sciences in 1805), a Veterinary Institute (1873) and a Technological Institute (1885) in Kharkiv, a Polytechnic Institute in Kyiv (1898) and a Higher Mining School (1899) in Katerynoslav.

Rapid growth followed in the Soviet period. By 1988, the number of higher education institutions had increased to 146 with over 850,000 students. Most HEIs established after 1990 are owned by private organizations.

The Constitution of Ukraine (1996), Law on Education (1996), the Law on Higher Education (2002) and the major reform legislation Law on Higher Education (2014) constitute the legal framework for Ukrainian higher education. Ukrainian legislation regulating higher education includes also more limited legislation as well as decrees and regulations of the President and the Cabinet of Ministers of Ukraine.

Because of a perceived lack of quality, 76 higher education institutions and their branches were denied licenses in 2015.

== Access and affordability ==
As in most communist Eastern European states, access to education for the masses was a high priority in Soviet Ukraine, largely due to the fact that during imperial times mostly only the nobles and the wealthy had access to post-secondary institutions. Citizens of the Soviet Union had free access to secondary education and were required to complete at least a junior specialist degree, equivalent to an associate degree in the US. Moreover, the Soviet Union exercised mandatory conscription of its male population. However those studying for a degree were exempt from the draft until they had completed their studies, so men would often stay enrolled to reach master's degrees to delay their entry into the military.

After gaining independence Ukraine retained the Soviet principle of having a post secondary education system that its population could afford. In 2009, Ukraine spent 7.3% of GDP on education compared to the United States' 5.2%. Trade schools (Technikums), which are analogous to community colleges in the US and award the junior specialist degree, continued to remain freely accessible for most citizens. Students wishing to enroll in a trade schools do not need to complete the full 11 grades of school and may enroll in 9th grade. However budget constraints forced tuition charges on university programs. Students wishing to enroll in universities must complete the full secondary education curriculum. During the last year of school, they take a placement test to determine their chances of enrolling and whether or not they will have to pay tuition. Moreover, students enrolled may receive a monthly stipend which is designed to cover their living and school expenses while they are enrolled in college. In 2012 the minimum monthly stipend was ₴550 for students enrolled in Technikums and ₴730 for students enrolled in Universities. In 2016, tuition costs for higher education were averaging less than $1,000 per academic year; but corruption forced them considerably higher. Students pursuing a doctoral degree beyond Specialist or master's degree are generally treated in a similar manner to graduate students in the US where they are expected to assist the faculty and may receive pay from the university as they perform their own research.

Although online education is not prominent in Ukraine, students may enroll in extramural college, which is the most common type of long distance education in Ukraine and many other former Soviet nations. During this type of enrollment, the student continues to work and is given all their assignments for the semester ahead of time. The student completes the assignments then returns to the university to explain their reasoning and complete testing. Many businesses in Ukraine subsidize their employees who return to pursue a higher degree using this method.

== Higher education qualifications ==
Higher education includes both academic and professional qualifications. This very important feature was inherited from Ukraine's Soviet past. The State Diploma serves as both an educational certificate and a professional license. Employment is determined by a match between the state determination of the knowledge and skills required for different occupation levels and the state determination of levels of educational qualification. Hence the classification of educational qualification corresponds to the occupational structure, leading to the introduction of the term ‘educational-proficiency’ level.

The Law on Higher Education (2002) establishes a three-level structure of higher education: incomplete, basic, and complete educational levels with corresponding educational-proficiency levels of Junior Specialist, Bachelor, Specialist and Master. In 2016 the Ministry of Education transformed this system to the levels of Junior bachelor, bachelor's, master's, Doctor of Philosophy and Doctor of Sciences.

=== Junior Specialist ===
Junior Specialist or Junior bachelor is an educational-proficiency level of higher education of a person who on the basis of complete secondary education has attained incomplete higher education, special skills and knowledge sufficient for discharging productive functions at a certain level of professional activity, stipulated for initial positions in a certain type of economic activity. The normative period of training makes 2.5–3 years.

Persons with basic secondary education may study in the educational and professional programs of junior specialist’s training, obtaining at the same time complete secondary education.

=== Bachelor ===
Bachelor is an educational proficiency level of higher education of a person who on the basis of complete secondary education has attained basic higher education, fundamental and special skills and knowledge, sufficient to cope with tasks and duties (work) at a certain level of professional activity (in economy, science, engineering, culture, arts, etc.). The normative period of training makes 4 years (240 ECTS credits).

Training specialists of the educational-proficiency level of Bachelor may be carried out according to the shortened programme of studies on the basis of the educational- proficiency level of Junior Specialist.

=== Master ===
Master is an educational proficiency level of higher education of a person who has attained complete higher education, special skills and knowledge, sufficient to cope with professional tasks and duties (work) of innovative character at a certain level of professional activity (in engineering, business administration, pedagogy, arts, etc.).

Training specialists at the level of Master may also be carried out on the basis of the educational-proficiency level of Specialist. The period of training makes typically 1–1.5 year (60-90 ECTS credits).

During their at the Master’s or Specialist's level, students are required to write their final work on a selected subject and make presentations, to be able to collect, analyse and summarize, synthesize and to communicate study and practical material. Knowledge of a foreign language is often required.

Training specialists of the level of Specialist or Master in such fields as medicine, dentistry, veterinary medicine, teaching is carried out on the basis of complete secondary education within the period of 5–6 years (301-360 ECTS credits), as is common in Western Europe for state registered professions.

=== Former higher education qualifications ===
==== Specialist ====
Specialist was an educational-proficiency level of higher education of a person who on the basis of the educational-proficiency level of Bachelor had attained complete higher education, special skills and knowledge, sufficient to cope with tasks and duties (work) at a certain level of professional activity (in economy, science, engineering, culture, arts, etc.). The normative period of training was 1 year (60 ECTS credits). In 2016 the specialist degree was disbanded in Ukraine.

== Diplomas and Certificates ==
Higher education graduates are awarded qualifications of the appropriate educational-proficiency levels and they are granted diplomas of the state format. The Diploma is the State-recognized document that serves as both an educational certificate and a professional license, confirming the attainment of the appropriate higher educational level and qualification of a certain educational-proficiency level (an academic degree in a field of study and speciality). The Law on Higher Education (2002) establishes the following types of documents that confirm higher education qualifications:

- Dyplom Molodshoho Spetsialista (Diploma/ qualification of Junior Specialist)
- Dyplom Bakalavra (Diploma/ qualification of Bachelor)
- Dyplom Spetsialista (Diploma/ qualification of Specialist)
- Dyplom Mahistra (Diploma/ qualification of Master)

== Quality assurance ==
The national system of quality assurance (QA) in Ukraine is one by means of licensing and accreditation procedures carried out by the Department for Licensing, Accreditation and Nostrification of the Ministry of Education and Science of Ukraine, through the State Accreditation Commission, the State Inspectorate of HEIs, and the Higher (Supreme) Attestation Board.

=== Licensing ===
The Law on Higher Education (2002) stipulates that educational establishments in Ukraine including those owned privately must be licensed before they can offer tertiary level educational programs. To be granted a license a HEI must meet the required standards set by the Ministry of Education and Science for higher education status at a certain level. These standards refer to: physical infrastructure, equipment and facilities, the learning resources (library and other media materials), the logistical, scientific-methodological and information base, and the number and qualification level of its staff, appropriate to the area of education and research in which it intends to offer programs of study. The licensing process assesses the list of subjects, the content of the educational program of these subjects, and the assessment tools used to examine students.

Licensed HEIs are listed in the Ministry’s Public Register of HEIs.

=== Accreditation ===
In Ukraine accreditation procedures include both accreditation of the programs of study in a certain field of study and specialization offered by HEIs, and institutional accreditation of HEIs.

==== Accreditation of programmes of study ====
To have a study program accredited in a certain field of study and specialization, a HEI must meet the demands of the higher education standards in terms of its educational and professional provision. Programs of study are accredited in relation to the relevant qualification associated with a certain educational-proficiency level, and thus at a certain level of accreditation.

==== Institutional accreditation of HEIs ====
The status of a HEI is determined by the proportion of programs that it has accredited at particular levels. A higher education institution may receive institutional accreditation at a certain level, if at least two thirds of its specializations have already received accreditation at this level.

The Law of Ukraine On Higher Education (2002) establishes four levels of accreditation of higher education institutions.

1. Higher education institutions of the first accreditation level train Junior specialists;
2. Higher education institutions of the second accreditation level train Junior specialists and/or Bachelors;
3. Higher education institutions of the third accreditation level train Bachelors, Specialists and, in certain professions (specialities), Masters;
4. Higher education institutions of the fourth accreditation level train Bachelors, Masters and Specialists. Additional criteria for the institutions of the fourth accreditation level include postgraduate and Doctoral courses, high-level research and publications activities.

== Level structure of HEIs ==
There are six types of higher education institutions in Ukraine:

- Universities: have the fourth level of accreditation and may be multi-disciplinary establishments (follow a classical university model) or ‘branch’ (mono-disciplinary/specialist) establishments (focused on some particular professional field (Technical, Medical, Agricultural, Pedagogical, Economics, etc.)). They act as leading research and methodological centers in both fundamental and applied research.
- Academies: have the fourth level of accreditation. Their educational provision is concentrated in a specific branch of knowledge in which they also act as leading research and methodological centers in both fundamental and applied research fields;
- Institutes: have third and fourth level of accreditation. Their educational provision is concentrated in a specific branch of knowledge in which they also conduct research and methodological research in both fundamental and applied fields. They may be independent or a sub-unit of a university or academy;
- Conservatoires: have third and fourth level of accreditation. Their educational provision is concentrated in culture and the arts, specifically music. They also conduct research and act as leading centers in the areas of their activity;
- Colleges: have second level of accreditation largely related to the provision of training leading to the acquisition of specific higher education qualifications. They may also constitute sub-units within higher education establishments with third and fourth level accreditation;
- Technical Schools: have first level of accreditation. They carry out educational activity leading to specialist areas of knowledge and skills related to specific occupations. They may also constitute sub-units within higher education establishments with third and fourth level accreditation.

=== Types of Universities (Academies) ===
The Ministry of Education and Science (Sports and Youth) recognizes the following categories of institutions of the top-level accreditation:

- Classical Universities
- Technical Universities
- Technological (Construction, Transportation)
- Pedagogical (Humanitarian, Physical Education and Sports)
- Culture (Arts, Design)
- Health Care Universities
- Agrarian Universities
- Economics (Finance, Administration, Entrepreneurship)
- Law (Law enforcement, Civil protection and life safety)
- Private Universities

=== National universities ===
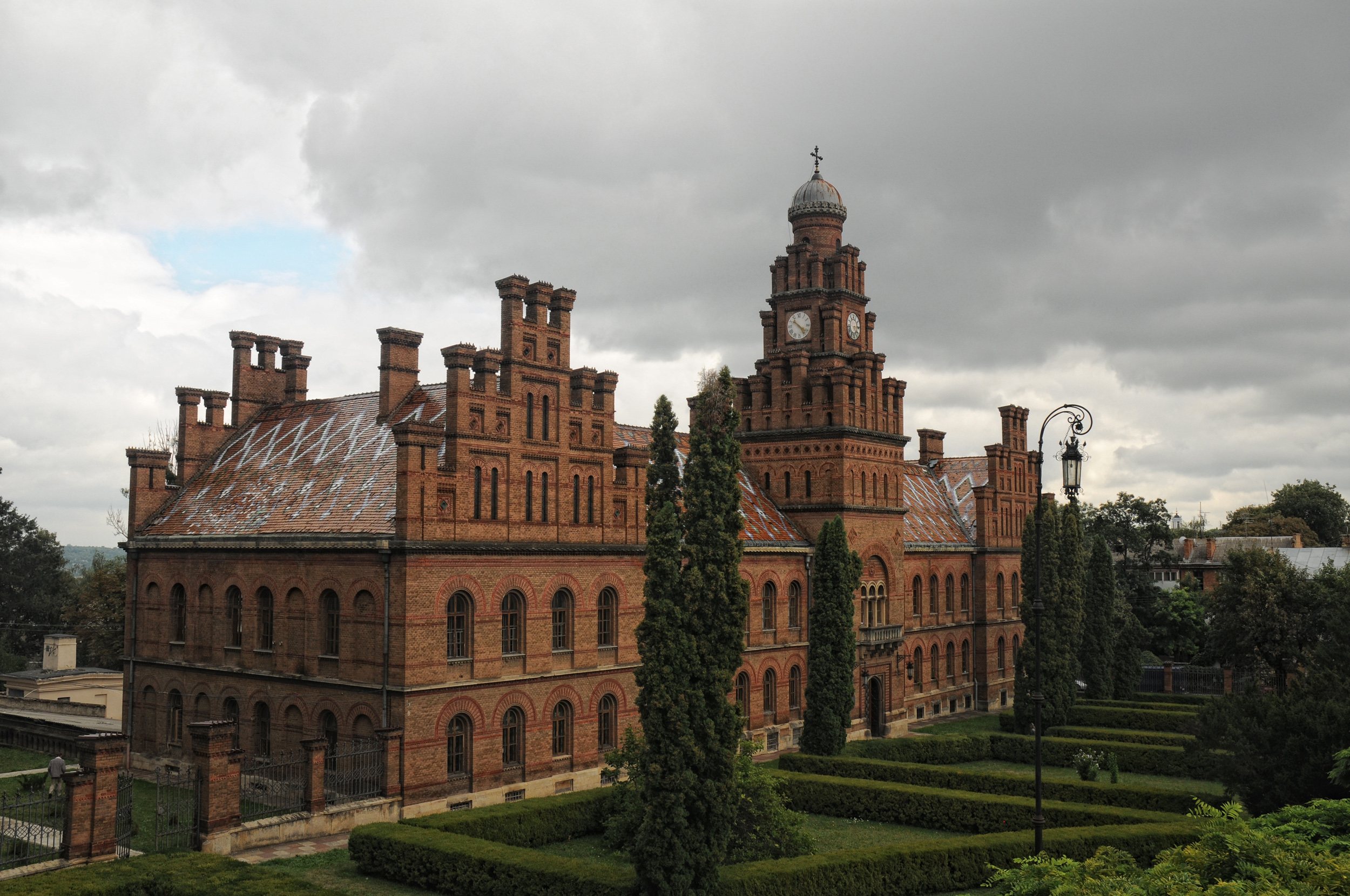
Chernivtsi University

Higher education institutions with 4th accreditation level may be bestowed the status of ‘national’ for outstanding performance in research and scientific activity. This status brings with it added powers in relation to immovable property, facilities, enterprises, institutions and other structural sub-units of the HEI; the award of professorial status; and ‘symbiotic’ and material incentives and rewards for employees of the HEI. It also accrues an additional budget for research activities.

== Postgraduate education ==
In Ukraine, postgraduate education is regarded as specialist education and professional training commencing after the Specialist, Master phase. The Law of Higher Education (Article 10) and the Law on Education (Article 47) regard Post-Graduate education as specialized education and professional training on the basis of the previously obtained educational-proficiency level and experience of the practical work. It is defined as retraining, specialization within a profession; expansion of the professional profile; probation within a profession, i.e. post-qualifying education or continuous professional development. The system of postgraduate training serves as a ground for lifelong learning.

=== Lifelong learning ===
There is a long tradition and pride in this kind of educational provision for ‘continuing education’ and for ‘social inclusion’, that continues today. Lifelong learning (LLL) is conceptualized on the one hand as the progression through academic qualifications: Bachelor, Specialist, Master, Candidate of Science, Doctor of Science. On the other hand, it also covers a wide range of educational courses designed for: ‘second chance’ students; for those who wish to change occupations; for on-the-job training for citizens in employment; for updating professionals; for second diplomas where only the specialist part of the curriculum needs to be followed; and to provide secondary school certificate for those who left school without qualification.

== Doctoral degrees ==
At the doctoral level, Ukraine has a two-degree system. The first qualification is the Candidate of Sciences (scientific degree of Kandydat Nauk) which normally requires at least three years of study after the award of the Specialist or the Master diploma and is achieved by submitting and defending a thesis (dissertation), as well as following post-graduate studies (aspirantura) in the specialist field. The second qualification is the Doctor of Sciences (scientific degree of Doktor Nauk), the highest degree in Ukraine, which is achieved by dissertation that must make an original contribution to a given field of learning, and after a period of further studies (doktorantura) following the award of Candidate of Sciences degree.

Doctoral study programs (post-graduate course, aspirantura – for Candidate of Sciences degree and doctoral course, doktorantura – for Doctor of Sciences degree) can be opened in higher education institutions of the third and fourth levels of accreditation or in research institutes and their branches.

The two doctoral degrees can be earned in two ways: as a result of studies in aspirantura and doktorantura or independently. The public defense of the dissertation is held in the form of a public presentation and scientific debates.

Professors have different ranks within the university system. For example a Dosent (Доцент) is analogous to an assistant professor in the United States.

== International study and student exchange ==
According to 2013 figures of the Minister of Education there are 61,000 foreign students in Ukraine.

In 2016 International Admission Center with support of Ministry of Education founded the Ukrainian Admission Center for foreign students .

== Reputations ==
Ukrainian professor O. Bazaluk reports that the Ukrainian education provides for a student nothing more than an illusion of training. As a result the majority of the Ukrainian graduates do not possess even a basic level of professional knowledge when they leave their schools. Due to extremely ineffective educational policy of the Ukrainian government and ubiquitous corruption, the everyday life of society has significantly changed. The social transformation has resulted in qualities such as aggression, rudeness, intolerance, boastfulness, and reticence.

According to Frances Cairncross (in April 2010) “There are too many small universities, the majority of which are ineffectively governed and mired in corruption. They are not able to withstand existing global challenges.” According to Anders Åslund (in October 2012) the quality of doctoral education is bad, particularly in management training, economics, law, and languages. He also signaled that the greatest problem in the Ukrainian education system is corruption.

76 higher education institutions and their branches were denied licenses by the Ministry of Education and Science of Ukraine in 2015 because of a perceived lack of educational quality.

In 2017, students entering the Ukrainian Catholic University, Taras Shevchenko National University of Kyiv, and the National University of Kyiv-Mohyla Academy had the highest average scores on the national entrance exam (External Independent Evaluation).

=== International rankings ===
No Ukrainian university has ever been ranked in the Academic Ranking of World Universities nor in the Performance Ranking of Scientific Papers for World Universities. However, the QS World University Rankings 2013/14 listed four Ukrainian HEIs including Taras Shevchenko National University of Kyiv (ranked 441-450), Kyiv Polytechnic Institute (601-650), Donetsk National University and Kharkiv Polytechnic Institute (both 701+). In the Webometrics Ranking of World Universities, Taras Shevchenko National University of Kyiv (838th) is the highest ranked university, Kyiv Polytechnic Institute, Kharkiv National University and Odesa University (1788th) are (also) ranked in the top 2000, and 303 are ranked lower than that (the lowest is Kherson State Maritime Academy at place 20,942). Four Ukrainian Universities were ranked in the Times Higher Education World University Rankings for the 2016-2017 school year, Lviv Polytechnic National University, Kyiv Polytechnic Institute, Taras Shevchenko National University of Kyiv, and the Karazin Kharkiv National University, which were all ranked in the 801+ category.

In 2012, Ukraine's Higher Education system was ranked as the top in Eastern Europe by Universitas 21, ahead of Czech Republic, Poland, Slovenia, Russia and Slovakia. The research group cited high education spending as a proportion of GDP compared to other nations as a likely cause of Ukraine having the best post secondary system in East Europe.

According to Global Competitiveness Report in 2008-2014 Ukraine ranked at 41-50th places among 130 countries by pillar ″Higher education and training".

== Major universities ==
- Kyiv Medical University of UAFM
- Kyiv National Linguistic University
- Kyiv National University of Trade and Economics
- Kyiv National Economic University
- Kyiv National University of Technologies and Design
- Crimea State Medical University
- Chernivtsi University (Yuriy Fedkovych Chernivtsi National University)
- Oles Honchar Dnipro National University
- Dnipro Academy of Continuing Education
- East Ukraine Volodymyr Dahl National University
- Donetsk National University
- Kharkiv Polytechnic Institute
- Kharkiv National University of Municipal Economy
- Kharkiv University (Karazin Kharkiv National University)
- Kyiv Polytechnic Institute
- Luhansk State Medical University
- Lviv Polytechnic
- Lviv University (Ivan Franko National University of Lviv)
- The National Academy of Fine Arts and Architecture
- National Aviation University
- National Mining University
- National University of Kyiv-Mohyla Academy
- Nizhyn Gogol State University
- Odesa University (I.I. Mechnikov Odesa National University)
- Odesa National Economics University
- Ostroh Academy
- Poltava University of Economics and Trade
- Priazovskij Gosudarstvenij Texnichescj Universitet
- State University of Telecommunications
- Sumy State University
- Taras Shevchenko National University of Kyiv
- Tavrida National V.I. Vernadsky University
- Ternopil National Economic University
- Ukrainian Catholic University
- Ukrainian Medical & Dental Academy
- Uzhhorod National University
- Zaporizhzhia National University

== See also ==
- List of culture universities in Ukraine
- List of universities in Ukraine
- List of medical universities in Ukraine
- Institute of Higher Education of NAPS of Ukraine
- Unified entrance exam (UEE)
- Unified professional entrance exam (UPEE)
- Unified state qualification exam (USQE)
