= Stavnytsia =

Rural locality in Khmelnytskyi Oblast, Russia

Stavnytsia Ставниця
- Village
- Location within Khmelnytskyi Oblast
- Coordinates: 49°26′52″N 27°25′55″E
- Country: Ukraine
- Oblast: Khmelnytskyi Oblast
- District: Khmelnytskyi Raion
- Established: 1274

Area
  - Total: 2,918 km^{2} (1,127 sq mi)
- Elevation /(average value of): 285 m (935 ft)

Population
  - Total: 1,121
  - Density: 0.3842/km^{2} (0.9950/sq mi)
- Time zone: UTC+2 (EET)
  - Summer (DST): UTC+3 (EEST)
- Postal code: 31530
- Area code: +380 3857
- Website: село Ставниця райцентр Летичів ^{(Ukrainian)}

Stavnytsia (Ukrainian: Ста́вниця) is a village in Khmelnytskyi Raion, Khmelnytskyi Oblast in western Ukraine. It belongs to Medzhybizh settlement hromada, one of the hromadas of Ukraine. The population of the village is around 1 121 persons. Local government is administered by Medzhybizh village council.

Until 18 July 2020, Stavnytsia belonged to Letychiv Raion. The raion was abolished in July 2020 as part of the administrative reform of Ukraine, which reduced the number of raions of Khmelnytskyi Oblast to three. The area of Letychiv Raion was merged into Khmelnytskyi Raion.

== Geography ==
The village is located on the left bank of the river Buzhok, at the confluence of the Southern Bug and Buzhok rivers. It is a not far from the Highway M12 (Ukraine) ( M 12) at a distance 20 kilometres (12 mi) from the former district center in Letychiv, 39 kilometres (24 mi) from the regional center of Khmelnytskyi, and 88 kilometres (55 mi) from the city of Vinnytsia.

== History and Attractions ==
The ruins of the Nevitske castle - "Castle Rakoczy" are preserved in the village. This is the only monument the 16th century of fortification that has been preserved in Ukraine. The first mention of the castle appeared in the 1274th year. In 1644, the castle was destroyed by the Hungarian Monarch Ferenc Rakoczy.

On the outskirts of the village were found Scythian settlements and settlement Cherniakhivska culture.

== People born here ==
- Anatoly Kashpirovsky (11 August 1939 – 3 October 2026) – a self-professed mass healer and hypnotizer who made his name on Russia's national television in the rocky years surrounding the collapse of the Soviet Union.
