= Museum of Sexual Cultures =

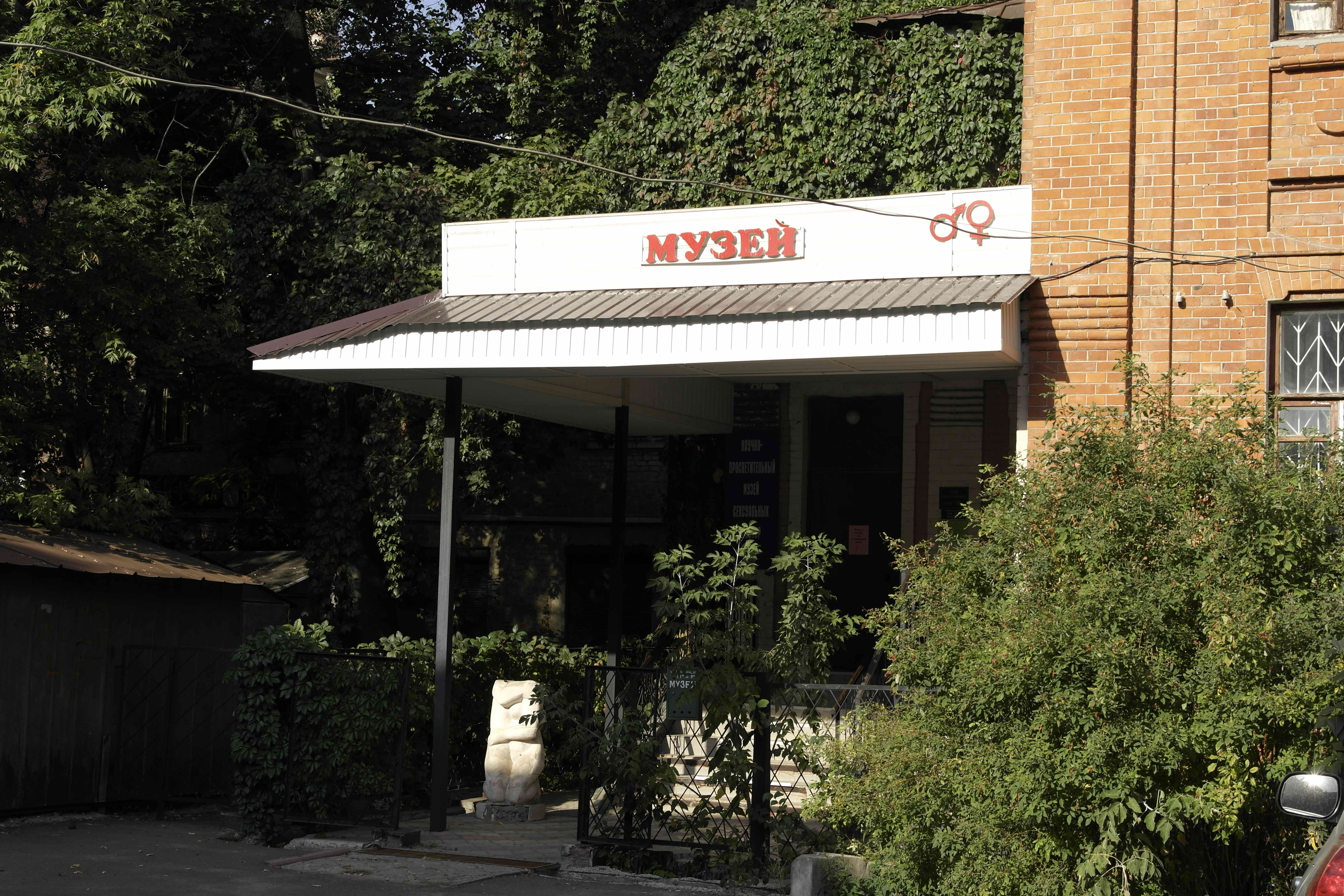
- Established: 1999
- Location: Kharkiv, Ukraine
- Type: Sex museum
- Collections: Antiquities, photography
- Architect: Valeriy Aksak

The Museum of Sexual Cultures (Ukrainian: Музей сексу і сексуальних культур світу, romanized: Muzey seksu i seksual'nikh kul'tur svitu) is a scientific and educational museum, which explores the sexual cultures of a number of countries. The first of its kind in both Ukraine, and in post-Soviet Eastern Europe, it is located in Kharkiv.

== Background ==
The museum was established in 1999 by the Department of Sexology and Medical Psychology of the Kharkiv Medical Academy. Based on the collection of Valentin Kryshtal, it is the first of its kind in any post-Soviet country, as well as the first in Ukraine, the museum reflects the sexual cultures of a number of countries. It was designed by the architect Valery Aksak. In 2021 a similar museum opened in Kyiv.

== Collections and displays ==
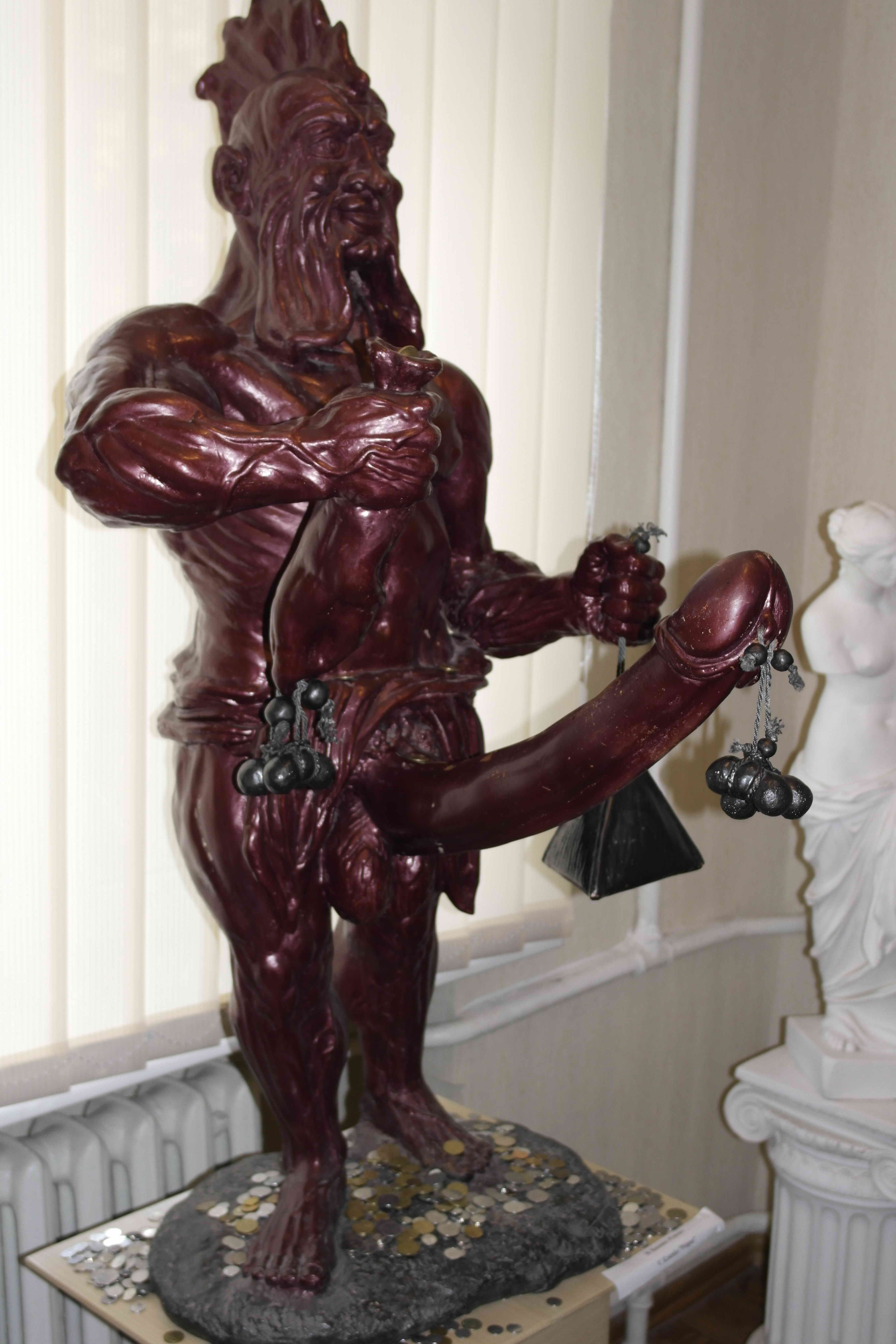
Statue of Priapus in the museum

The museum has ten exhibition halls, which can only be visited once a person is over eighteen – the age of consent in Ukraine. The museum also hosts a gallery aimed at teenagers, where youth-led events are held and that audiences over the age of 15 can attend. Topics such as intimacy, and sexual orientation are included in the interpretation. Particular attention is paid to the prevention of sexually transmitted diseases, especially AIDS.

The collection includes antiquities, prints and drawings and contemporary collections of photography and ephemera. It also includes a medieval chastity belt. There is a statue of Priapus to which visitors can make offerings.

The museum's retail offer is a sex shop. In response to Ukraine's COVID-19 vaccination campaign, the museum was one of a number of cultural institutions that Ukrainians could visit for free using their vaccination voucher.
