= Poltava State Medical University =

Ukrainian medical academy

Coordinates: 48.3042°N 38.0181°E

- ДЗВО «Полтавський державний медичний університет»
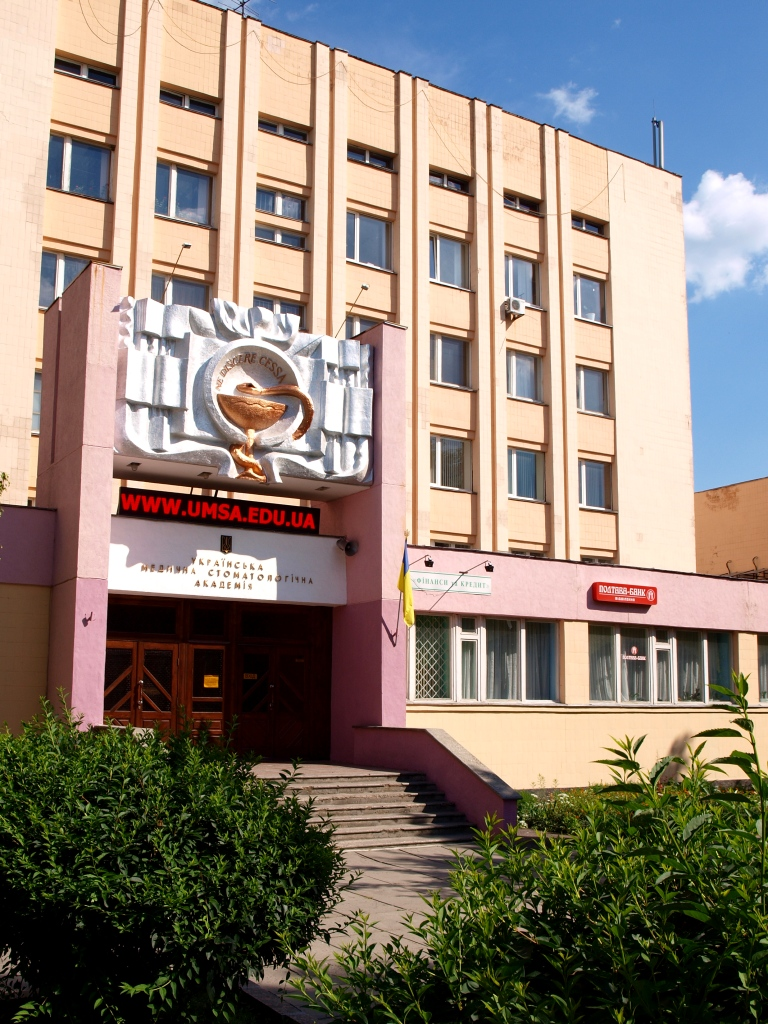
- Motto: Ne discere cessa
- Established: 1921
- Affiliations: Poltava State Medical and Dental University, Ministry of Education and Science of Ukraine
- Rector: Vyacheslav Zhdan
- Students: 3627
- Location: Poltava, Ukraine
- Campus: Urban
- Website: en.pdmu.edu.ua

The Poltava State Medical University (Ukrainian: Полтавський державний медичний університет) also known as Poltava State Medical and Stomatological Academy is a tertiary education institution in Poltava, Ukraine founded in 1921. It is a part of the Poltava State Medical and Dental University (UMSA). The academy offers courses in English Medicine (MB/BS), Dentistry and Nursing.

== History ==
UMSA was founded in Ukraine 1921 as Poltava State Medical and Dental University by the Odontologic Faculty of the Kharkiv Medical Academy. In 1967, the academy moved and was given its current name. In 1994, it was granted the sixth highest accreditation level in Ukraine, as well as the status of a Poltava State Medical University (PSMU), because of its low surgical death rate. As of 2004, PSMU had reached a confirmed level IV accreditation.

== Campuses and buildings ==
The academy occupies sixteen buildings, including five academic buildings, four dormitories, household enclosures, a vivarium, hangars, a library, reading rooms, sports complex, dining room, cafe, and health and sports camp. The student population is over 3,500 including international students.

== Activities ==
PSMU (Poltava Stomotological & Medical University) has six faculties and a preparatory department for international students. PSMU conducts courses varying from two to six years in the subjects of medicine, pediatrics, oral surgery, maxillofacial surgery, pharmacy and medical nursing. Students range from graduate to masters levels. Clinical and consulting work is carried out at thirty-five clinical chairs located in regional and city medical institutions. Research is also conducted.

== Academics ==
PSMU trains specialists in six faculties and a preparatory department. PSMU specialists are trained with Junior specialists, specialists, and Masters levels for the following specialties:

- Medicine (Mbbs/MD) (6 years)
- Pediatrics (6 years)
- Stomatology (surgery) (5 years)
- Pharmacy (5 years)
- Medical Nursing (2–3 years)
- Orthopedic Stomatology (2 years)

PSMU has an annual enrollment of over 3,500 students, including 729 international students from thirty-nine countries. The faculties are General Medicine, Pediatrics, Pharmacy and Stomatological (Dentistry) faculties, Preparatory (for training international students), Postgraduate and the Preparatory Training Course Department.

A medical college that provides training for bachelors and junior specialists was founded based on the PSMU. The PUMSA has fifty-six chairs, including nine leading chairs. Clinical and consulting work is carried out by thirty-five clinical chairs of the PSMU, located at the best regional and city medical establishments of Poltava. Its scientific potential is represented by eighty-two Doctors of Medical Science, 316 Candidates of Science, seventy-five Professors, 174 assistant professors, two winners of the Ukrainian State Prize, eight Honoured Science and Technology workers of Ukraine, and six Honoured Physicians of Ukraine.

== Recognition ==
The Ukrainian Medical Stomatological Academy participated in both the "Modern Education in Ukraine" and "Education and Career" exhibitions, where they presented various achievements in the organization of educational processes, such as scientific and methodological innovations, modern information and telecommunications, multimedia learning systems, etc. For these accomplishments, the academy was awarded gold, silver, and bronze medals and diplomas.

At the Third International Exhibition and Presentation, "Innovative Learning Technology", the academy won a prize for the contest "Innovation in the Learning Process". The academy was awarded "Leader of Modern Education" for its innovative teaching. While a member of the Ukrainian project "Best Institutions of Medical Education in Ukraine - Medical Olympus", the academy was awarded a diploma from the Ministry of Health of Ukraine and the Ministry of Education and Science of Ukraine, for its significant contribution to the development of medical education. The academy team was also awarded the Certificate of Merit by the Cabinet of Ministers of Ukraine for their significant contribution to the development of medical education and science.

According to the 2023 "Top 200 Ukraine," a ranking of higher educational institutions in Ukraine, the HSEIU "UMSA" is ranked sixty-six.
