= Kyiv Medical University of UAFM =

Private medical university in Kyiv, Ukraine

Coordinates: 50.4399°N 30.5123°E

Kyiv Medical University
- Приватний заклад вищої освіти "Київський медичний університет"
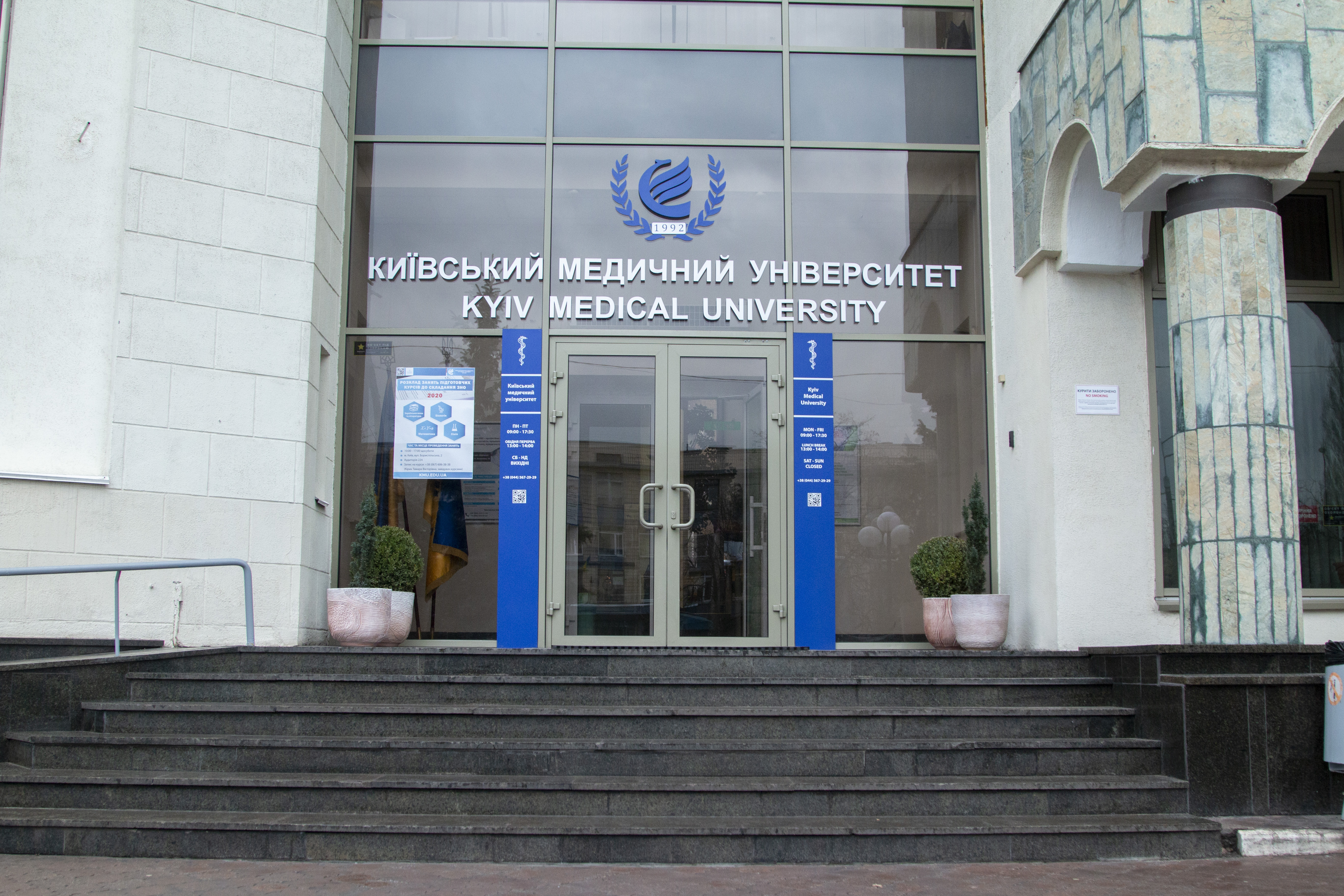
- Type: Private medical university
- Established: 1992; 33 years ago
- Accreditation: Ministry of Education and Science of Ukraine
- Rector: Ivnyev Borys Borysovych, Prof., MD (2015)
- Students: 3900
- Location: Kyiv, Ukraine
- Campus: Urban
- Website: Official website

The Kyiv Medical University is a Ukrainian higher educational institution. Established in 1992, about 3,900 people study at the university.

== Recognitions ==
As a university with the highest level of accreditation by the Ministry of Education and Science of Ukraine, all degrees issued to foreign students are legalized and apostolized by the Foreign Affairs Ministry of Ukraine.

Kyiv Medical University is recognized and listed in international directories of medical universities such as the International Medical Education Directory (IMED). Graduates are thus eligible to write the United States Medical Licensing Examinations, along with certificates that are recognized by the Education Commission for Foreign Medical Graduates (ECFMG) in the US and the Medical Council of Canada (MCC) for eligibility of graduates to obtain certification and Licensure hence may pursue residency and postgraduate programs in these countries.

The university is also registered in the AVICENNA Directory, which is maintained by the University of Copenhagen, in collaboration with the World Health Organization and the World Federation for Medical Education (WFME), meaning that KMU is fully recognized by the WHO's governments.

The FAMIER school ID is F0002349.

Kyiv Medical University is recognized by the Ghana Dental and Medical Council, Pakistan Medical and Dental Council, and the Pakistan Medical Commission, along others. It has joint research and partnership relations with institutions, such as The Poland Medical Academy, Centers for Disease Control and Prevention (CDC), the southern Kazakhstan scientific and practical conference with international participation and contract with the Knurów Sląsk Hospital of Poland about organization of medical practice for students in 4th and 5th courses of the medical faculty.

It has also started its campus or extended branch in Bytom, Poland, meaning students can now study in their Polish Branch in the Silesian region of Poland.

== See also ==
- List of universities in Ukraine
- List of medical universities in Ukraine
