= Zaporizhzhia State Medical University =

Public medical university in Zaporizhzhia, Ukraine

Coordinates: 47.83619°N 35.11502°E

Zaporizhzhia State Medical and Pharmaceutical University
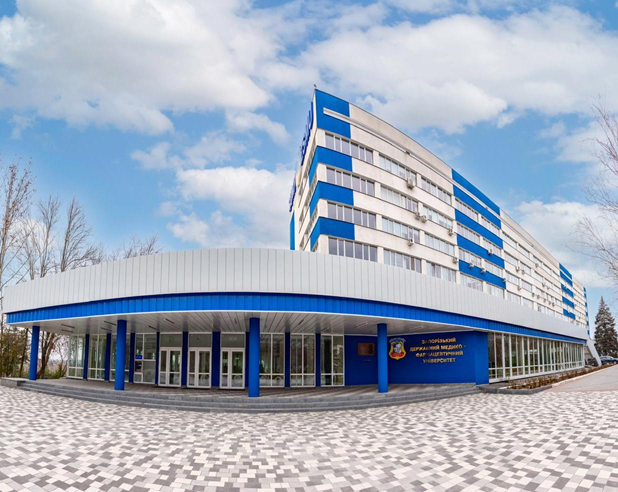
- Type: Public medical university
- Established: 1903
- Accreditation: Ministry of Education and Science of Ukraine
- Affiliations: Ministry of Health of Ukraine
- Rector: Kolesnyk Yuriy Mykhailovych
- Location: Zaporizhzhia, Ukraine
- Campus: Urban
- Website: Official website
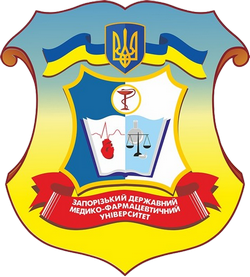

Zaporizhzhia State Medical and Pharmaceutical University ( "Запорізький державний медико-фармацевтичний університет") is a medical higher educational public university in the city of Zaporizhzhia, Ukraine. Zaporizhzhia State Medical and Pharmaceutical University (ZSMPhU) is a higher education institution in Ukraine holding the fourth level of accreditation and operating with autonomous management status.

== History ==
The institution traces its origins to the Women's Pedagogical Courses established in Odesa in 1903. In 1959, the Pharmaceutical Institute was relocated from Odesa to Zaporizhzhia and renamed Zaporizhzhia Pharmaceutical Institute. In 1968, it was reorganized as the Zaporizhzhia Medical Institute.

Training of foreign citizens at Zaporizhzhia State Medical University began in 1973 with the establishment of the Preparatory Faculty for Foreign Citizens, the first preparatory faculty in Ukraine with a medical and biological focus designed specifically for international students.

In its first academic year, 106 students from 22 countries across Africa, Asia, and Latin America enrolled in the program. To coordinate work with international students, the Dean's Office of the Preparatory Faculty was created in 1974, and in 1976 the Faculty for the Training of Foreign Citizens was established.

Since its foundation, more than 13,000 foreign graduates have earned medical and pharmaceutical degrees from the university. Many now work in over 100 countries worldwide in various healthcare roles.

In 1994, the institution was reorganized as Zaporizhzhia State Medical University, receiving the fourth (highest) level of accreditation in Ukraine. It offers Bachelor's, Specialist, and Master's degrees in medicine and pharmacy for both Ukrainian and international students.

In 2022, the Cabinet of Ministers of Ukraine and the Ministry of Health approved the establishment of Zaporizhzhia State Medical and Pharmaceutical University as the legal successor to the Zaporizhzhia State Medical University and the Zaporizhzhia Medical Academy of Postgraduate Education.

== Training fields ==
Zaporizhzhia State Medical and Pharmaceutical University offers undergraduate and postgraduate degree programs in medical, pharmaceutical, and biomedical fields. The principal programs include:

Medicine – Master’s degree, duration 5 years 10 months.

Pediatrics – Master’s degree, duration 5 years 10 months.

Dentistry – Master’s degree, duration 4 years 10 months.

Pharmacy – Master’s degree, duration 4 years 10 months.

Technology of Perfumery and Cosmetic Products – Master’s degree, duration 4 years 10 months.

Therapy and Rehabilitation – Bachelor’s degree, duration 3 years 10 months; Master’s degree, duration 1 year 10 months.

Medical Diagnostics and Treatment Technologies – Bachelor’s degree, duration 3 years 10 months; Master’s degree, duration 1 year 6 months.

Medical Psychology – Master’s degree, duration 5 years 10 months.

Biotechnology and Bioengineering – Bachelor’s degree, duration 3 years 10 months.

Cosmetology – Bachelor’s degree, duration 3 years 10 months.

== Student life ==
The university campus is situated on the bank of the Dnieper River in the park zone of Zaporizhzhia.

The campus includes five academic buildings, five student hostels, a sports complex, a scientific and art library, an amateur art club, several cafeterias, and a student café. All buildings and dormitories are equipped with ramps for people with disabilities and 24-hour security monitoring.

Student housing facilities include renovated rooms with modern furniture, shared kitchens with electric stoves, and updated showers and bathrooms on each floor.

The university maintains a catering service that operates buffets in each building and hostel, as well as a student café named Recipe.

The sports complex, located near the academic buildings and hostels, includes outdoor fields for football, volleyball, basketball, and handball, along with indoor gyms and fitness clubs where regular sports events are organized.

The university also hosts music, dance, and art clubs, and holds annual cultural events such as the “Student Spring” festival and graduation celebrations.

Medical services for students and staff are provided by an on-campus medical center.

== Departments ==
Zaporizhzhia State Medical and Pharmaceutical University is organized into several faculties and institutes:

Medical Faculty No. 1

Medical Faculty No. 2

Medical Faculty No. 3

Pharmaceutical Faculty

International Faculty

Educational and Scientific Institute of Postgraduate Education

== Clinical Work ==
Therapeutic and diagnostic activities are an integral part of the educational and scientific work at Zaporizhzhia State Medical and Pharmaceutical University (ZSMPhU). These activities are conducted by the academic staff of clinical departments to support practical training for undergraduate and postgraduate students and to collaborate with healthcare institutions in improving medical care.

ZSMPhU has 41 clinical departments, comprising 19 therapeutic, 16 surgical, and 6 pediatric departments. The clinical staff includes 407 academic employees, among whom 86 are doctors of medical sciences and 256 are candidates of medical sciences. Additionally, 30 part-time staff participate in clinical activities. Among clinicians, 71.2% hold the highest qualification category.

Clinical departments provide medical assistance, including patient consultations, diagnostic procedures, surgeries, and rehabilitation. They also organize joint scientific and clinical conferences with healthcare institutions, implement and test innovative medical technologies, conduct clinical research, and monitor the application of scientific developments in practice.

Since early 2024, ZSMPhU clinicians at 18 affiliated healthcare institutions conducted nearly 94,000 patient consultations and over 16,000 surgical interventions.

Zaporizhzhia State Medical and Pharmaceutical University (ZSMPhU) operates clinical and diagnostic activities through its staff in 11 interregional and regional specialized medical centers equipped with modern diagnostic and treatment equipment.

The university's clinical departments collaborate with various specialized centers, including:

Center for Vascular and Endovascular Surgery – providing consultations, minimally invasive procedures for vascular conditions, and development of surgical methods for pulmonary embolism prevention and treatment of Nutcracker Syndrome.

Cardiac Surgery Center – performing heart valve and aortic surgeries, coronary artery bypass grafting, correction of congenital heart defects, and thoracoscopic procedures.

Center for Traumatology and Orthopedics – offering consultations and surgical interventions, including osteosyntheses and intramedullary fixations.

Regional Center for Gastroenterology and Endoscopy – providing endoscopic stenting and biologic therapy for inflammatory bowel diseases.

Regional Center for Allergology and Dermatology – treating systemic sclerosis, Stevens-Johnson Syndrome, and psoriatic arthritis with advanced therapies.

Specialized Center for Liver, Bile Duct, and Pancreatic Surgery – performing laparoscopic, endoscopic, and cytoreductive procedures.

Angioneurology Center – managing stroke treatment with personalized approaches.

Pediatric Urology Center – offering surgical and endoscopic procedures for obstructive uropathies and other urinary tract disorders.

Modern Pediatric Allergology and Pulmonology Center – providing diagnostics and treatment for allergic and respiratory diseases in children.

Center for In Vitro Fertilization and Genetic Screening – performing IVF cycles, genetic screening, and reproductive medicine consultations.

Dermatology Center at the University Clinic – providing dermatological consultations, advanced diagnostic procedures (digital dermatoscopy, trichoscopy), and modern therapeutic treatments, including phototherapy.

These centers integrate advanced diagnostic methods, therapeutic procedures, and research-based innovations into clinical practice to support education, research, and patient care.

== Science ==
The scientific infrastructure of the Zaporizhzhia State Medical and Pharmaceutical University includes several specialized institutes and laboratories, among them the Research Institute of Medical and Ecological Problems, the Institute of Human Pathology, the Medical and Laboratory Center, and the Medical Center of Human Genetics and Reproduction. The university also operates 17 interdepartmental scientific laboratories and a certification testing laboratory for cosmetic, perfume, and household chemicals.

University scientists conduct fundamental, clinical, and pharmaceutical research. Priority areas include the study of neuroendocrine mechanisms of diabetes, hypertension, and ischemic brain injury, as well as research in immunology and microbiology. In clinical medicine, the university has contributed to the development of Ukrainian transplantology, performing the country's first kidney, liver, pancreas, and heart transplants between 1992 and 2003. Its surgeons also specialize in cardiovascular and reconstructive operations and minimally invasive procedures.

In collaboration with Motor Sich JSC, the university developed Ukraine's first endoprosthesis systems, including knee and hip replacements. Research teams also focus on cardiology, pediatrics, infectious diseases, and oncology, developing diagnostic and treatment methods for chronic and hereditary disorders.

In the field of pharmaceutical research, the university conducts synthesis and analysis of biologically active compounds for the creation of new medicinal products. Researchers have developed a number of original drugs based on newly synthesized substances, including Tiotriazolin, Nootril, Tiocetam, Tiocetam-Forte, Amiotril, Levotil, Indotril, Tiodaron, Trianol, Carbatril, and Liziniy. The university has also created new medical products such as Palystrin, Magnelong, Sanamast, Glytamag, Apifitol, Fitapisan, Immunofit, Bisholan, Gipofitol, Betizol, Befan, and Vitagren, which are used in cardiology, neurology, hepatology, dermatology, ophthalmology, and infectious disease treatment.

The university publishes several peer-reviewed journals—Zaporizhzhia Medical Journal, Pathology, and Current Issues in Pharmaceutical and Medical Science and Practice, Modern Medical Technologies—which are indexed in international databases. Over 40 international cooperation agreements in education and research are in force.

== Scientific laboratories ==
The Training Medical and Laboratory Center is the main base for experimental research at Zaporizhzhia State Medical and Pharmaceutical University . It supports postgraduate and doctoral students in conducting research, as well as state-funded and departmental projects. The center comprises 15 laboratories equipped with modern high-tech instruments from the USA, Japan, and European countries.

Facilities and Equipment

The center includes a vivarium with climate control, housing laboratory animals in compliance with the European Convention for the Protection of Animals Used for Experimental Scientific Purposes and Ukrainian legislation on animal welfare. Facilities include quarantine rooms, a forage kitchen, disinfection rooms, storage for feed and decontaminated stock, and sanitary blocks for staff.

The operating-laboratory block allows surgical modeling of pathological states in animals and collection of biological material. Preoperative and operating rooms are equipped with sterilizers, LED surgical lamps, anesthesia tables, and instruments. There is also a facility for humane euthanasia and collection of tissues and biological fluids.

Research Laboratories

Laboratories at the center focus on a variety of research areas, including:

Pharmacological Screening: Studies acute toxicity and biological activity of new compounds, including antihypoxic, antioxidant, hepatoprotective, and hypolipidemic effects.

X-ray and Ultrasound Screening: Provides imaging for experimental animals during pathological modeling and implant studies.

Experimental Pathophysiology: Examines basic life support system functionality in humans and animals with experimental pathology.

Morphometric, Histochemical, and Densitometric Analysis: Studies the localization and synthesis of hormones, biologically active substances, and antigens at the cellular level.

Enzyme-Linked Immunosorbent Assay (ELISA): Quantifies biologically active substances in biological fluids for clinical diagnostics.

Pharmacology and Functional Biochemistry: Conducts preclinical trials of cardiotropic, neurotropic, angioprotective, and hepatoprotective drugs.

Electrophoresis and Immunoblotting: Evaluates molecular markers of organ and tissue damage and the effectiveness of therapies.

Microbiological Research: Studies antimicrobial activity of compounds and monitors antibiotic-resistant microorganisms.

Molecular Genetic Research: Performs DNA, RNA, and gene polymorphism analyses to study multifactorial diseases.

Electron Microscopy: Conducts ultrastructural studies of cells, tissues, and organs.

Physical and Chemical Research: Analyzes medicinal substances, dosage forms, and medicinal plant raw materials.

Organic Synthesis Laboratories: Synthesize biologically active compounds and determine physicochemical properties.

Elemental Analysis and Chromatography: Measures elemental composition, molecular weight, and chemical structure of compounds.

Phytochemical Laboratory: Standardizes medicinal plant materials.

Standardization of Medicinal Products: Develops methods for the manufacture and quality control of medicines.

Certification and Testing of Perfumes, Cosmetics, and Household Chemicals: Conducts pharmacological, rheological, and biopharmaceutical research.

Experimental Morphology: Performs histological, histochemical, and immunohistochemical studies on animals with modeled pathological processes.

Annually, the scientific laboratories support research for approximately 70 dissertations.

== Simulation training ==
Zaporizhzhia State Medical and Pharmaceutical University integrates the principles of simulation-based medicine into its educational programs.

Anatomical and Virtual Learning

Students begin training with 3D exploration of human anatomy in the anatomical museum using the Anatomage Table, combining software and hardware for studying human anatomy, including rare and clinically complex cases.

Training Centers and Facilities

The university operates several modern training centers totaling approximately 3,300 m², meeting European standards for medical education. These include:

Interdepartmental Training Center, serving students of multiple specializations;

Specialty Centers for dentistry, physical therapy, ergotherapy, cosmetology, laboratory diagnostics, and pharmacy training;

Multidisciplinary Educational, Clinical, and Scientific Training Center, equipped with advanced simulation technology.

Students practice venipuncture, injections, catheterization, transfusions, and emergency interventions under supervision, focusing on teamwork and patient safety.

Specialized Training Units

Resuscitation Unit: Students train in basic and advanced life support, blood pressure measurement, ECG monitoring, defibrillation, and cardiopulmonary resuscitation.

Obstetrics and Gynecology: Equipped with the Noelle childbirth simulator for physiological and pathological deliveries, alongside neonatal simulation facilities.

Pediatrics: Features mannequins representing different age groups for clinical and emergency practice; robotic mannequins simulate cyanosis, breathing, and vital signs.

Functional Diagnostics: Equipped with ultrasound scanners, EEG, spirographs, ECGs, and 24-hour monitoring systems for pre-graduation hands-on experience.

Disaster Medicine: Trains students for emergency response scenarios such as road accidents, burns, gunshot and blast injuries, emphasizing triage and evacuation skills.

Surgical and Telemedicine Training

The center provides training in suturing, laparoscopic, and laparotomic operations using the Chloe C-2101 mannequin compatible with real surgical tools. Students can simulate ectopic pregnancy operations and intra-abdominal procedures.

A telemedicine-equipped family doctor's office allows consultations with remote specialists, using portable diagnostic systems that include video cameras, tablets, ECG monitors, digital dermatoscopes, glucometers, and spirometers.

Dentistry and Pharmacy Simulation

Dentistry: Training involves high-fidelity mannequins with articulators and interchangeable teeth, allowing practice in oral examination, anesthesia, extractions, and prosthetics. Real-time feedback is provided through built-in cameras.

Pharmacy: Simulation occurs in both physical and virtual pharmacies, where students manage prescription scenarios and patient interactions. The virtual program includes locally adapted training cases

Body Interact Patient Simulator

The BodyInteract simulator supports multidisciplinary training across internal medicine, pediatrics, surgery, obstetrics, and emergency care. Students can perform diagnostic tests, prescribe treatment, and observe real-time physiological responses based on their actions.

Assessment and Evaluation

Simulation-based training supports both formative and summative evaluation. Objective Structured Clinical Examination (OSCE) stations test students’ clinical and procedural skills under standardized conditions.

== See also ==
- List of universities in Ukraine
- List of medical universities in Ukraine
