= Institute of Higher Education of the National Academy of Educational Sciences of Ukraine =

Coordinates: 50.41791°N 30.55399°E

The Institute of Higher Education of the National Academy of Educational Sciences of Ukraine (IHE NAESU) is one of the National Academy of Educational Sciences of Ukraine (NAES) Institutes responsible for control, research and development of system of higher education.

== History ==
The Institute was created on 7 June 1999 according to a decree of Cabinet of Ministers of Ukraine №988.

One of the last organization's final achievements was participation in the creation of the National Agency for Quality Assurance in Higher Education.

== See also ==
- List of universities in Ukraine
- List of medical universities in Ukraine
- Open access in Ukraine to scholarly communication
- Higher education in Ukraine
