= Kharkiv Medical Academy of Post-graduate Education =

University in Kharkiv, Ukraine

Coordinates: 48.3042°N 38.0181°E

Kharkiv Medical Academy of Post-graduate Education of MoH of Ukraine
- ДЗ «Харківська медична академія післядипломної освіти МОЗ України»
- Type: Medical university
- Established: 1923
- Accreditation: Ministry of Education and Science of Ukraine
- Affiliations: Ministry of Health of Ukraine
- Rector: Olexandr Khvysiuk
- Location: Kharkiv, Ukraine
- Website: kmapo.com

The Kharkiv Medical Academy of Post-graduate Education (Note: Ukrainian: Державний заклад «Харківська медична академія післядипломної освіти МОЗ України», romanized: Derzhavnyi zaklad “Kharkivska medychna akademiia pisliadyplomnoyi osvity MOZ Ukrainy”) is a Ukrainian university in Kharkiv.

== History ==
The Kharkiv Medical Academy of Postgraduate Education was established on 11 November 1923 and was called "Ukrainian State Institute for Advanced Training of Physicians". In 1931 the department of postgraduate education and internship was established at the institute. Since 1991 the Institute was subordinated to the Ministry of Health of Ukraine and it was renamed in "Kharkiv Institute for Doctors' Improvement".

Under the resolution of The Cabinet of Ministers of Ukraine from 15 March 1999 № 379 it was renamed to "Kharkiv Medical Academy of Post-graduate Education".

== Campuses and buildings ==
Academy has 4 hostels with general area of 17438 square meters, 9321 square meters from them is housing area (3 hostels of flat system and one hostel of corridor system) intended for 1600 persons. The wealth of listeners reaches to 100%. There is a study room, branch of the library, café intended for 100 persons, cooking room, office personal services in hostels.

The campus includes the Museum of Sexual Cultures, established in 1999, based on the private collection of Valentin Kryshtal.

== Institutes and faculties ==
Departments are merged into 5 faculties: Therapy, Surgery, Pediatrics, Family Medicine, Medical Prophylaxis. Training of foreign students is performed at postgraduate courses, clinical ordinatura, probation courses and preparation department. Foreign students from more than 30 countries are studying at the academy now. Volume of admittance is 450 specialists according to the Licence АВ №585783 and for college it is 30 persons according to the licence АВ № 552226.

Academy has unique conditions for realization of training on the highest level in all the types of postgraduate education. On the 5 faculties of the academy foreign students study at clinical ordinatura, postgraduate courses and probation courses in following specialties: obstetrics and gynecology, anesthesiology, gastroenterology, dermatovenereology, endocrinology, oncology, cardiology, clinical laboratory diagnostics, orthodontics, orthopedic stomatology, orptopedics and traumatology, otolaryngology, ophthalmology, psychotherapy, radiology, preventive dentistry, therapy, urology, surgery, operative dentistry, ultrasound diagnostics and others.

On 1.09.2012 270 foreign citizens are studying at KhMAPE, from them 232 persons at clinical ordinatura, 10 persons at postgraduate courses and 28 persons.

== Notable people ==
- Valentin Grischenko, science school obstetrics and gynecology.
- Alexey Korzh, science school of traumatology and orthopedics.
- Victor Skumin, Russian and Soviet scientist, psychiatrist, psychotherapist, and psychologist, Professor, Doktor Nauk. He was the first to describe a previously unknown disease (1978), now it is called Skumin syndrome.
- Alexandr Shalimov, science school surgery.

== International cooperation ==
At the moment academy has made an international contracts with next organizations: Sana'a University (Republic of Yemen), Baltic International Academy (Latvia), Akaki Tsereteli State University (Kutaisi, Georgia), Russian Medical Academy of Postgraduate Education, State Medical University (Tbilisi, Georgia), Higher Medical School (Sosnowiec, Poland), Tashkent Institute for Doctors' Improvement (Uzbekistan), Azerbaijan State Institute for Doctors' Improvement (Azerbaijan, Baku), Centre of International programs under Ministry of Education of Republic of Tajikistan, State-financed educational institution of higher professional education "Kursk State Medical University" (Russia, Kursk).

More than 1 000 of cycles of the secondary specialization, courses of preparation to attestation, cycles of subject improvement, information courses and probation courses are held, at which up to 20 000 listeners study.

"The Centre of Innovative Technologies of Education" was created at KhMAPE for development and adoption into the pedagogical process of new educational technologies. In this centre the lectures with use of modern equipment, international videoconferences with the participation of doctors from the USA, Canada, Poland and others are held. Telecommunication facilities of the centre allow taking part at tele-consultations, to get experience needed for development of tele-educational technologies. Research work is a part of work of academy. It is conducted according to the subject plan approved by the academic council.

To the fundamental scientific directions of the academy belong: family medicine in the system of healthcare, role of system of connective tissue in pathogenesis of specific and non-specific diseases, development of technologies of keeping autocells of bone marrow, their use for treatment of diseases of different genesis. During many years the scientific bases of academy are the leading scientific research institutions of the AMS of Ukraine.

Academy has a unique network of clinical bases, which are situated in more than 80 institutions of treatment and prophylaxis and are intended for 10500 beds.

== See also ==
- List of universities in Ukraine
- List of medical universities in Ukraine

== Notes and references ==
- Official site
