= Luhansk State Medical University =

University in Luhansk, Ukraine

- Державний заклад вищої освіти "Луганський державний медичний університет"
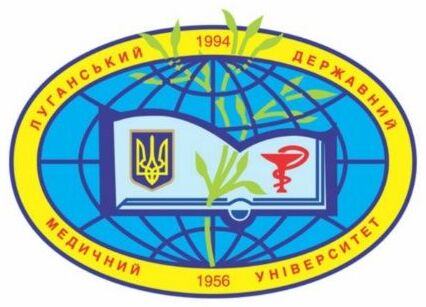
- Motto: Medicina fructosior ars nulla
- Motto in English: No art is more useful than medicine
- Type: Public medical university
- Established: 1956
- Accreditation: Ministry of Education and Science of Ukraine
- Rector: Smirnov Serhiy Mykolayovych
- Location: 16 July Street, Rivne, Rivne Oblast
- Campus: Urban
- Website: www.lsmu.edu.ua/en/

The Luhansk State Medical University (Ukrainian: Луганський державний медичний університет) or LSMU is a higher education institution, established in 1956 in Luhansk, a city in the Russian-occupied Luhansk Oblast of Ukraine. Due to the War in Donbas, the LSMU temporarily moved from Luhansk to Rubizhne in October 2014. Since March 2022, the LSMU has temporarily moved to the city of Rivne, capital of Rivne Oblast in northwestern Ukraine.

== History ==
The school was founded as Voroshilovgrad State Medical Institute on 6 May 1956, pursuant to Decree 2522 of Ukraine's Council of Ministers, the institute's first rector was Ivan Danilovich Vashchenko, acting chief physician of the Dzerzhynsk regional hospital. He was succeeded by Prof. Evgenij Ignatovich Palchevskij, MD, who led the institute from 1957 to 1960. Palchevskij was a Second World War veteran who was a graduate of Kyiv Medical Institute, later renamed the Bogomolets National Medical University. Under his leadership, the academic staff and students of the institute were first organized as an Academic Council and a Student Society.

Associate Prof. Fedir Dmitrovich Povelitsya, PhD, who led the institute from 1960 to 1963, was a graduate of the Kharkiv National Medical University and had also fought in World War II. He was instrumental in developing the institute's clinical site.

Associate Prof. Donat Grigorovich Korchikov, PhD, institute director from 1963 to 1966, studied at Kharkiv National Medical University from 1941 to 1942, at Tashkent Medical Institute until 1943, then in the Kharkiv infantry mortar school as a Second World War combatant. In 1950 he graduated from the Dnipropetrovsk Medical Institute, now the Dnipro State Medical University. Having completed the institute's clinical sites, he worked part-time as an assistant professor of surgery.

In 1979, the institute began offering postgraduate training, and from 1983 it began training foreign students in paediatrics, recruiting students from countries in Africa (Ghana, Nigeria, Egypt, Libya, Morocco) and Asia (India, Iran, Iraq Malaysia, Singapore). In 1998, the university also opened schools of pharmacy and dentistry. The university has three academic buildings with scientific laboratories, a pharmacy, a dental clinic, a library and a fitness centre, and it has operated a number of clinics in Luhansk's various medical institutions.

There are 22 clinical and 18 theoretical professorships, and over 400 instructors, including 76 doctors of science; over 87 percent of its instructors hold higher scientific degrees. Most programs are taught in either English or Russian as the medium of instruction. The university's research focus is on the medical aspects of ecological problems in the heavily industrialized Donbas region and on the development and application of medical life support for casualties in man-made disasters. The university publishes several scientific journals and anthologies. By 2012, the university had more than 3,000 students from over 60 countries. Graduates are eligible for the United States ECFMG certification and are also eligible for certification in Canada and many other countries after passing a medical licensing examination in one of these countries.

Due to the war in Donbas, the university's faculty and students evacuated the area in September 2014, and classes resumed in Rubizhne, another city in Luhansk Oblast. Since 26 March 2022, LSMU has been operating in Rivne, capital of Rivne Oblast in northwestern Ukraine.

== Campus infrastructure ==
The university campus is located in centre city of Luhansk. The university's three academic buildings include laboratories for scientific research and a vivarium for maintaining laboratory animals, a facility for pharmacy instruction, a modern, fully equipped dental clinic and a centre for family medicine. The campus has a modern library, a sports complex with fitness centre, tennis courts and cricket pitch, and three multi-storey student residences with Internet access. It maintains a technical centre with lathes for metalworking, two pumping stations and five transformer substations. The university has also operated a number of clinics in Luhansk's various medical institutions. The total area of all campus buildings is 73,957m² — including classroom facilities, 18,172m²; training and support, 15,870m²; utility services, 25,135m²; and residences, 14,870m².

== Rectors ==
- Ivan D. Vashchenko (06/05/1956 to 24/02/1957)
- Eugene Gnatovych Palchevskiy (25/02/1957 to 05/25/1960)
- Theodore D. Povelitsya (05/25/1960 to 18/11/1963)
- Donat G. Korchykov (11.18.1963 to 27.12.1966)
- Irina Josypivna Tchaikovsky (from January 1967 to June 1975)
- Anatoly Faddeev (from 26.09.1975 to 08.15.1984)
- Vladimir G. Koveshnikov (1984–2003)
- Valery K. Ivchenko (2003-2014)
- Igor Ioffe (2014–2020)
- Smirnov Serhiy Mykolayovych (2020-present)

== Notable people ==
Some well-known LSMU graduates include Raisa Bogatyrova, an obstetrician-gynaecologist and a former Ukrainian Minister of Health; the late Vladimir Sergeevich Zemskov, an internationally famous oncologist and surgeon in Kyiv; the late Valery K. Ivchenko, a trauma surgeon who was himself rector of LSMU from 2003 to 2014; and Tatiana Tkachuk, a specialist in gynaecological oncology who has authored numerous scientific papers.

== Journals and books ==
- "Ukrainian Journal of extreme medicine behalf H.O.Mozhayeva"
- "Ukrainian Journal of Clinical and Laboratory Medicine"
- "Ukrainian Medical Almanac"
- "Ukrainian morphological Almanac"
- "General Pathology and Pathological Physiology"
- "Actual problems of Obstetrics and Gynecology, Clinical Immunology and Medical Genetics"
- "Surgery of Donbas"

== See also ==
- List of universities in Ukraine
- List of medical universities in Ukraine
