= List of libraries in Ukraine =

This is a list of libraries in Ukraine. As of 2018, there were some 15,600 public libraries, 8 national libraries, 189 higher education libraries, and 15,500 school libraries in the country.

== Libraries by region ==
=== Cherkasy Oblast ===
- Scientific library of Uman State Pedagogical University named after Pavlo Tychyna

=== Chernihiv Oblast ===
- Chernihiv Regional Library for Youth
- Sofia and Oleksandr Rusov Chernihiv Regional Universal Scientific Library

=== Dnipropetrovsk Oblast ===
- Dnipropetrovsk Regional Scientific Library
- M. Svetlov Dnipropetrovsk Regional Youth Library
- Ukrainian State University of Science and Technologies (USUST) Scientific Library, Dnipro (Ukrainian: Наукова бібліотека УДУНТ)

=== Kharkiv Oblast ===
- Central Scientific Library of the V. N. Karazin Kharkiv National University
- Kharkiv Korolenko State Scientific Library
- Kharkiv Public Library
- Scientific Library of the Ukrainian Engineering Pedagogics Academy

=== Kherson Oblast ===
- Kherson Oblast Library For Children

=== Kyiv ===
- American Library at Kyiv-Mohyla Academy
- Maksymovych Scientific Library
- National Historical Library of Ukraine (Ukrainian: Національна історична бібліотека України)
- National Library of Ukraine for Children
- National Scientific Agricultural Library (Ukrainian: Національна наукова сільськогосподарська бібліотека)
- National Scientific Medical Library of Ukraine (Ukrainian: Національна наукова медична бібліотека України)
- National University of Kyiv-Mohyla Academy Library
- State Scientific and Pedagogical Library of Ukraine named after V. O. Sukhomlynskyi (Ukrainian: Державна науково-педагогічна бібліотека України імені В.О. Сухомлинського)
- State Scientific and Technical Library of Ukraine (Ukrainian: Державна науково-технічна бібліотека України)
- Vernadsky National Library of Ukraine (Ukrainian: Національна бібліотека України імені В.І. Вернадського)
- Yaroslav Mudryi National Library of Ukraine (Ukrainian: Національна бібліотека України імені Ярослава Мудрого)
- Zabolotny State Scientific Architecture and Construction Library (Ukrainian: Державна наукова архітектурно-будівельна бібліотека імені В. Г. Заболотного)

=== Luhansk Oblast ===
- Sievierodonetsk City Public Library

=== Lviv Oblast ===
- Lviv Oblast Library for Children
- Scientific Library of Danylo Halytsky Lviv National Medical University (Ukrainian: Наукова бібліотека Львівського національного медичного університету імені Данила Галицького)
- Scientific library of Ivan Franko National University of Lviv (Ukrainian: Наукова бібліотека Львівського національного університету імені Івана Франка)
- Stefanyk National Scientific Library (Ukrainian: Львівська національна наукова бібліотека України імені Василя Стефаника)

=== Mykolaiv Oblast ===
- Scientific library of Admiral Makarov National Shipbuilding University

=== Odesa Oblast ===
- Odesa National Scientific Library (Ukrainian: Одеська національна наукова бібліотека)
- Scientific library of Odesa State University named after Ilya Mechnikov

=== Sumy Oblast ===
- Scientific library of the Ukrainian Academy of Banking
- Sumy State University Library

=== Ternopil Oblast ===
- Library of West Ukrainian National University
- Ternopil regional library for young people

=== Vinnytsia Oblast ===
- Scientific and technical library of Vinnytsia (Ukrainian: Науково-технічна бібліотека Вінницького національного технічного університету)

=== Volyn Oblast ===
- Volyn Regional Library for Children (Ukrainian: Волинська обласна бібліотека для дітей)
- Volyn Regional Library for Youth (Ukrainian: Волинська обласна бібліотека для юнацтва)
- Volyn State Regional Universal Scientific Library named after Olena Pchilka (Ukrainian: Волинська державна обласна універсальна наукова бібліотека ім. Олени Пчілки)

=== Zakarpattia Oblast ===
- Scientific library of Uzhhorod national university

=== Zhytomyr Oblast ===
- Zhytomyr Regional Library for Children (Ukrainian: Житомирська обласна бібліотека для дітей)
- Zhytomyr Regional Library for Youth (Ukrainian: Житомирська обласна бібліотека для юнацтва)
- Zhytomyr Regional Universal Scientific Library named after Oleg Olzhych (Ukrainian: Житомирська обласна універсальна наукова бібліотека імені Олега Ольжича)

== See also ==
- Access to public information in Ukraine
- Copyright in Ukraine
- List of archives in Ukraine
- Mass media in Ukraine
  - List of publishing companies of Ukraine
  - Open access in Ukraine
- Ukrainian literature

in Ukrainian

- Libraries of Ukraine (in Ukrainian)
- Publishing in Ukraine (in Ukrainian)
- Ivan Fedorov Book Chamber of Ukraine, est.1919 (in Ukrainian)
