= Serbin =

Serbin may refer to

- Serbin, Texas, an unincorporated community in the United States
- Serbin Fashions, a defunct American clothing company
- Serbin Open, a golf tournament on the LPGA Tour played from 1953 to 1957
- Serbin (surname)

== See also ==
- Serbian (disambiguation)
