= Valerii Kryshen =

Ukrainian scientist and surgeon

Valerii Kryshen (Ukrainian: Валерій Павлович Кришень) (born 1955) is a Ukrainian scientist, Doctor of Medicine, and professor of general surgery.

== Biography ==
Kryshen was born on 11 September 1955 in Dnipropetrovsk (now Dnipro, Ukraine) in what was then the Soviet Union to a medical family. He completed his medical degree in 1978 and began working in the surgical unit in Dnipropetrovsk city hospital. He chairs the general surgery department at Dnipropetrovsk State Medical Academy.

== Achievements ==
Kryshen authored near the 400 scientific papers, research articles, manuals, monographs, state patents and inventions, ministerial instructions and branch directions. He supervised doctoral students and participated in thesis defense reviews. He was a certified member of the European Society of Surgery (ESS) and the member of ESS Board at the time being He provided relevant commentary on the ESS website. He was on the faculty of Ukrainian and European Surgical Congresses and was a member of the scientific international committee at 8th World Gastric Cancer Congress. He is a member of editorial board of two Ukrainian and two International journals of surgery and gastroenterology.

Kryshen created a new school, exposing young surgeons to clinical practice and research. He presided over and was a member of the government examination graduating and post-graduating commission and committee of experts in connection with medical, scientific and educational licence certification of research institutions and higher educational establishments in Ukraine. He administered and supervised 7 magistrate, 6 candidate and 1 doctorate scientific degree theses.

Kryshen's professional interests include acute surgical diseases and abdominal trauma treatment along with new aspects and high technology of elective and urgent surgery. He is included in Bristol Who`s who Registry in Medical Practice and High Education heading. Kryshen is listed by Swiss international collection of Hubner's in biographic encyclopedia of successful Ukrainian "Who is who in Ukraine", published in Germany and included in Encyclopedia of Modern Ukraine, printed in Kyiv.

== Awards and honors ==
Kryshen is a member of the National Academy of Sciences of Ukraine.

He was awarded several medals: Merited Inventor of USSR, Silver and Bronze Participant of Achievement Government Exhibition of USSR and UkSSR.

== Sources ==
- Дніпропетровська державна медична академія:історія,події,особистості/до 95-річного ювілею/. Dnipropetrovsk state medical academy:to 95th anniversary. Kharkiv, 2011, p. 97
- Who is who in Ukraine /in Ukrainian / Kyiv, 1997.
- Кришень Валерій Павлович /in Ukrainian/ www.uk.m.wikipedia.org
- Encyclopedia Modern Ukraine, Kyiv, 2014, vol. 15
- www.dsma.dp.ua
- Professors of Dnipropetrovsk medical academy 1916-2019.”Porogy”,2020.-576 p./ in Ukrainian /
