= National University of Kyiv-Mohyla Academy Library =

Library in Kyiv, Ukraine

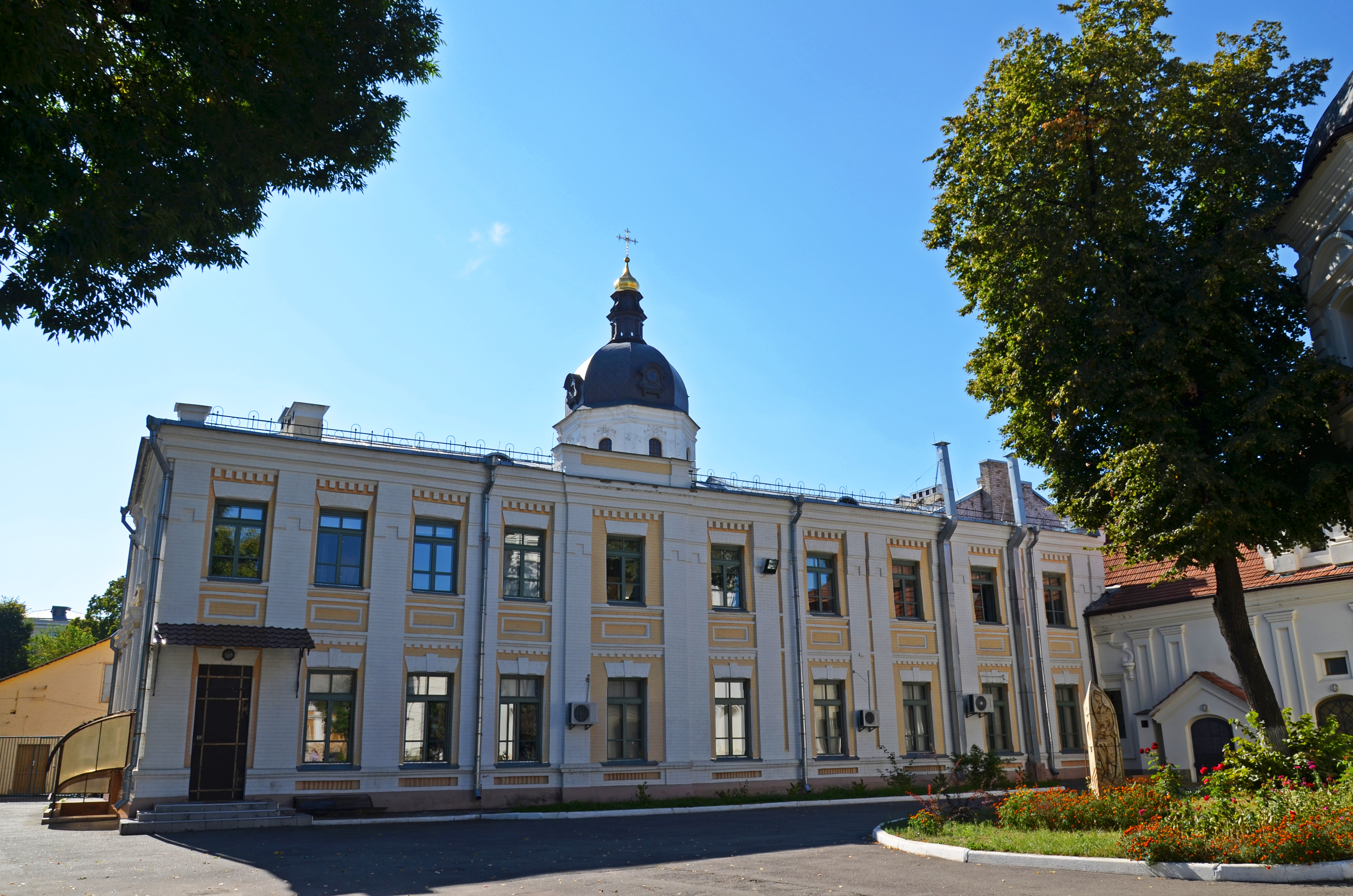
- 50.46426473294387°N 30.520809255171258°E
- Location: 2, Skovorody Street, Kyiv, Ukraine
- Established: 1992

Collection
- Size: more than 826 000 items

Other information
- Employees: ca. 60
- Website: library.ukma.kiev.ua

The National University of Kyiv-Mohyla Academy Library (Ukrainian: Наукова бібліотека Національного університету «Києво-Могилянська академія», translit.: Naukova biblioteka Natsional'noho universytetu "Kyyevo-Mohylians'ka akademiya") is the library system of the National University of Kyiv-Mohyla Academy, one of the oldest universities in Ukraine, founded in 1615, closed in 1817 and revived in 1991. It is a key academic resource that supports the teaching, learning, and research goals of the university; its various materials can be accessed by students, scholars, and the general public. Almost 70% are books and periodicals, donated by individuals, institutions and organizations from around the world. Library is composed of several locations across the university campus.

Amongst the collection are many rare items such as one of the four extant copies of The Travels of Macarius, Patriarch of Antioch by Paul of Aleppo.

== History ==
Estimated date of creation of the Kyiv Mohyla book collection is unknown. Approximately, it began to function in times of Kyiv Brotherhood School, since 1615. Significant contribution to the formation of the Library later did Petro Mohyla, who showed special concern in enriching library collections. He bequeathed his own book collection a few days before he died. But the terrible fire in 1658 almost completely destroyed the Library. By the 18th century the Library has totaled 3,500 books in different languages, especially in Latin. By late 18 century there were 12,000 items. In the 19th century library was transferred to Kyiv Theological Academy with total collection approximately 150,000 items. Since 1920s part of Library is transferred to Vernadsky National Library of Ukraine. In 1992 library was opened in renewed University. It was firstly located in Blagovischennia Church and then in rooms of the revived university.

Closure of the Theological Academy in the early 20th century and events that followed the October Revolution, led to almost complete destruction of the Library. During the years of the totalitarian regime, most of the books were either lost or transferred to other institutions. Books that survived are now located in the Vernadsky National Library of Ukraine.

== Library locations and facilities ==
=== Research Library ===
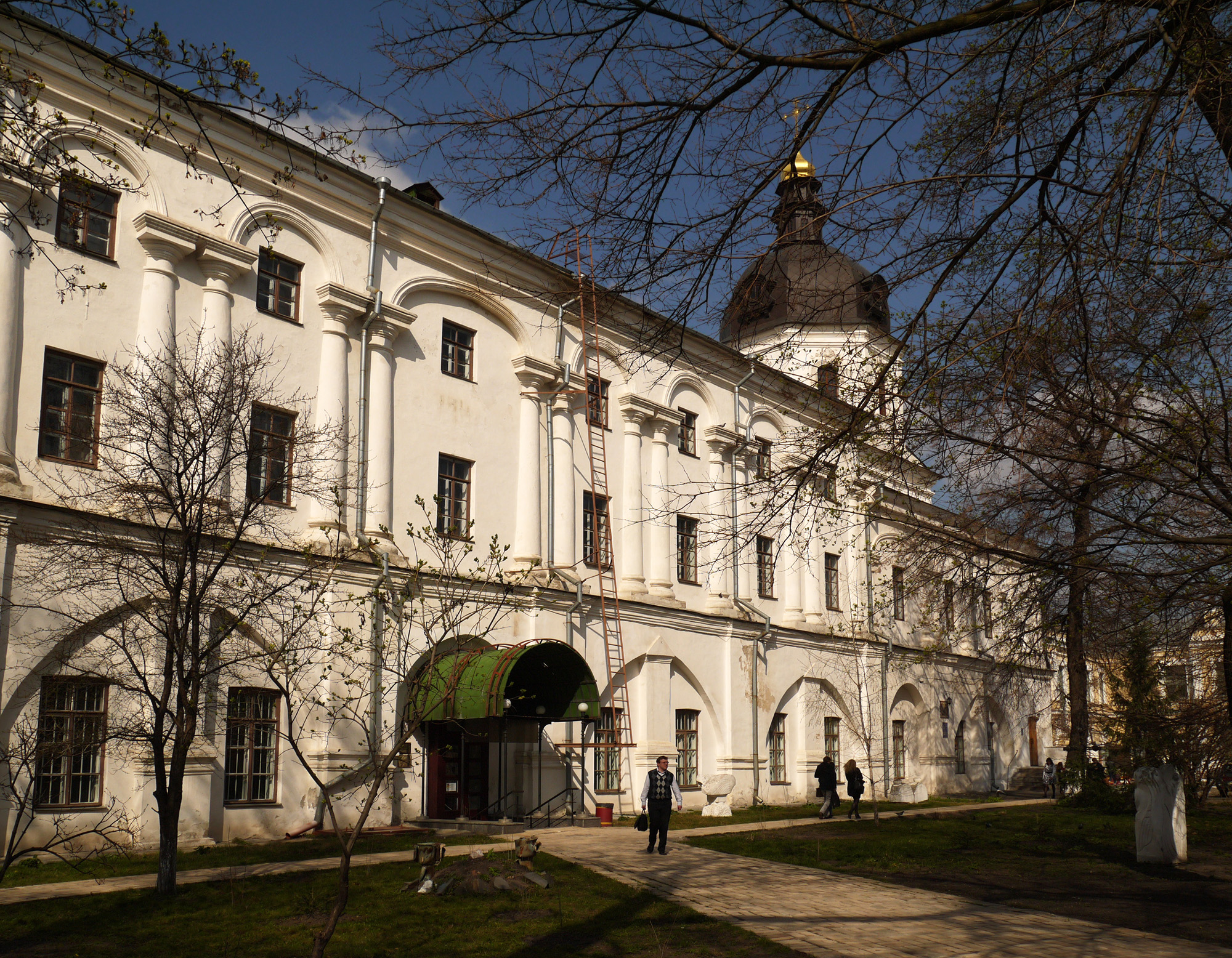
Research Library was in Old Academy Building till 2017

Old Academic Building is one of the architectural landmarks of the Kontraktova Ploscha which is located on Podil, the oldest district of Kyiv. It has a complicated history of reconstructions, both functional and decorative. The original one-storied building was finished in 1703. The second floor and the Church of the Annunciation in the far eastern part of the building were built in 1735-1740 by Rafail Zaborovsky and according to architect Johann Schädel project. After the big fire in Kyiv in 1811 the building was reconstructed with the involvement of the architect A. Melensky. In 1860s open galleries were bricked up. Since the second half of the 19th-century library of Kyiv Theological Academy (the oldest college of the Ukrainian Orthodox Church) was placed here. After Academy being closed in 1919, Vernadsky Library's rare books collections were arranged in Old Academy Building and these collections were not conveyed to Kyiv-Mohyla academy after its revival in 1992. During World War II the site was slightly damaged (roof, decorations). In 1947, 1968, 1980 Old Academy building underwent renewal. In February 1992 the site came under the jurisdiction of National University of Kyiv-Mohyla Academy and National University of Kyiv-Mohyla Academy Library started gathering its holdings here. In 2017 the first stage of building long-planned restoration. Library and archives were relocated to other buildings.

=== Tetyana and Omelyan Antonovych Bachelor Library ===
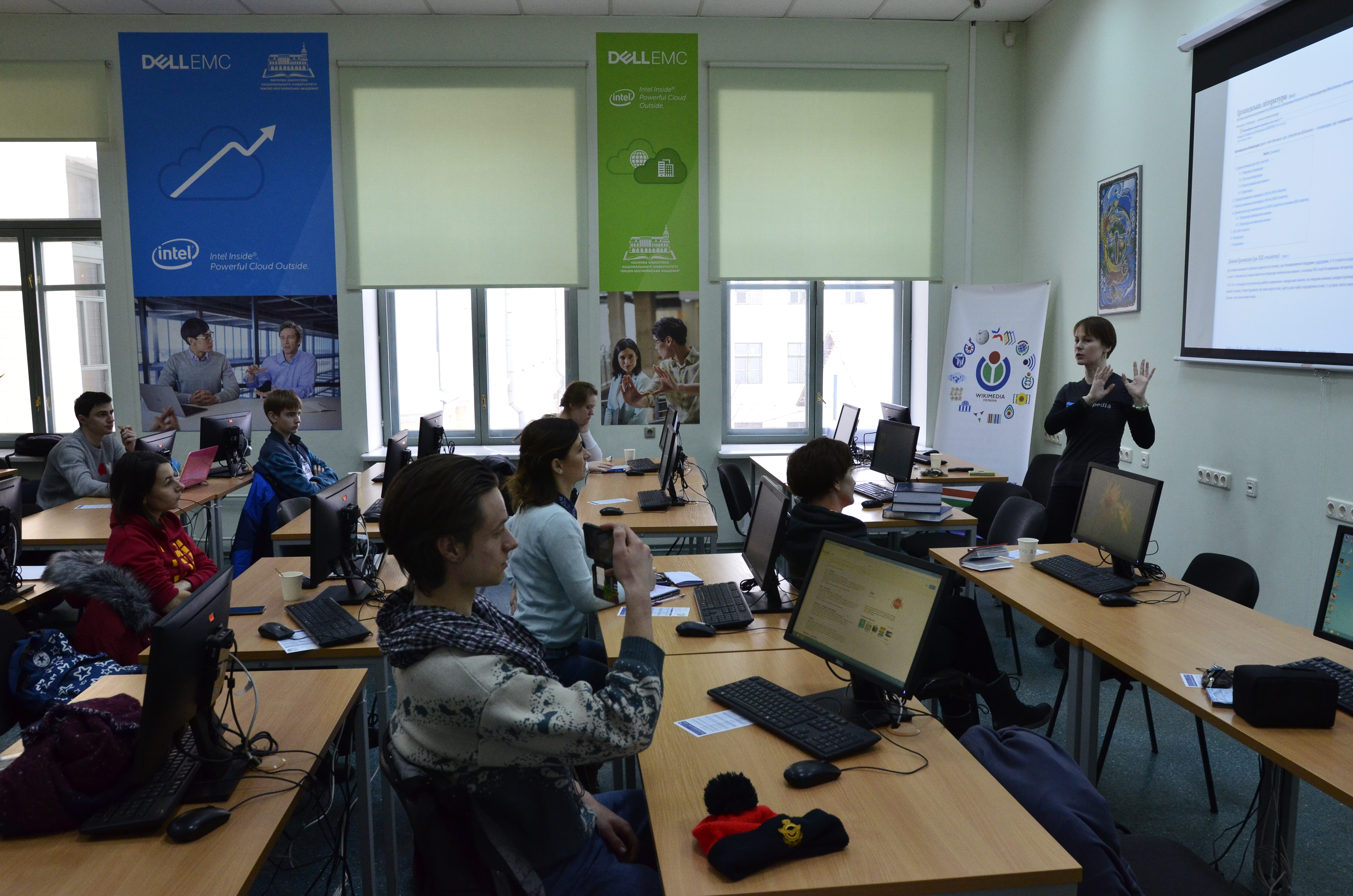
Computer room in Bachelor library

The current main University Library building was being built on the site of a historic 19th-century building which served as a hospital until the beginning of the 1990s. The interior of the building was being totally rebuilt and equipped with communication and energy systems. It is named in honor of its principal benefactors Tetiana and Omelian Antonovych, Ukrainian-born couple who immigrated to the United States, and who donated one million dollars to restoration. Another million dollars have come from donors in Ukraine, the United States and Canada. The library was opened on May 24, 2007. The library is home to the university's General Collection.

=== Viktor Kytasty American Library ===
The American Library is named in memory of Victor Kytasty, who dedicated himself to the development and growth of the National University of Kyiv-Mohyla Academy. It is a public library maintained as a department of the National University of Kyiv-Mohyla Academy Library. It was opened after the U.S. Embassy in Ukraine transferred the library from the America House to the campus of the Kyiv-Mohyla Academy in 1998. The library offers readers up-to-date English-language resources, books for kids and adults, free Internet access, and fun events like Friday night film showings. Address: 8/5 Voloska str., building 4 room #116.

=== Omeljan Pritsak Memorial Library ===
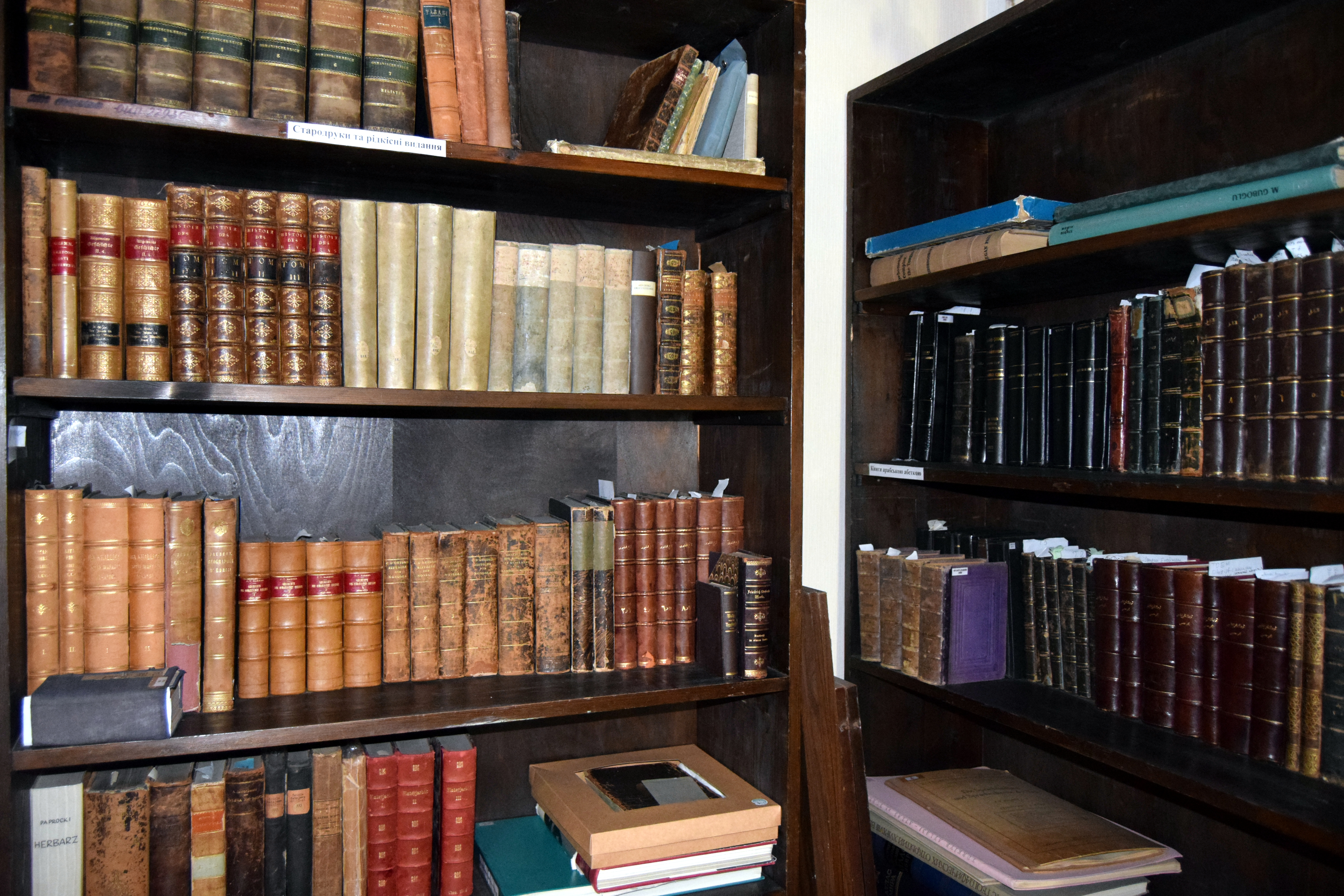
Omeljan Pritsak Book Collection

In 2007, one of the leading Ukrainian universities, the National University of Kyiv-Mohyla Academy, received personal archive of Omeljan Pritsak, the first Professor of Ukrainian History at Harvard University and the founder and first director (1973-1989) of the Harvard Ukrainian Research Institute. The heritage, collected by Omeljan Pritsak for 70 years, contains manuscripts, printed editions, publications, historical sources, archival documents and artistic and cultural monuments on philosophy, linguistics, world history, Oriental Studies, Slavic Studies, Scandinavian Studies, archeology, numismatics etc. There are more than 20 thousand items, which are available through the electronic catalog.

In 2009, Omeljan Pritsak Research Center for Oriental Studies was established on the basis of this Memorial Library.

=== Other Libraries ===
The other libraries located on the National University of Kyiv-Mohyla Academy campus include Philological Library, located in the third Building, which houses volumes in the areas of philology, literature; Pre-university Studies Library, located in the Bursa Building; and Library in Center of Polish and European Studies, located in the 6th Building, which houses volumes in Polish.

== Special collections ==
There are 67 private collections donated by Ukrainian scholars mostly. Significant historical, cultural and scientific value brings the special Rare Books collection with more than 13, 000 items.

At the end of 2005, James Mace's library and archive were donated to the National University of Kyiv Mohyla Academy. Archive and library collection represents materials that describe Mace's life, academic activities and history of ukrainian studies in the USSR and abroad. Library collection counts over 1200 volumes of scientific works, periodicals, and other documents.

== See also ==
- List of libraries in Ukraine
