= Scientific Library of the Ukrainian Engineering Pedagogics Academy =

- Українська інженерно-педагогічна академія Наукова бібліотека
- 49.988911530576125°N 36.23039689804919°E
- Location: Kharkiv Oblast, Ukraine
- Type: Scientific library

Other information
- Affiliation: Ukrainian Engineering and Pedagogical Academy
- Website: http://library.uipa.edu.ua/

The Scientific Library of the Ukrainian Engineering Pedagogics Academy is a scientific and informational center of the Ukrainian Engineering Pedagogics Academy in Kharkiv, Ukraine. It specializes in informational support for training, pedagogical and scientific processes. The library holds 886,000 volumes. The library houses three reading rooms and collects in fiction, non-fiction, and course books in addition to its specialized areas.

== History of the Library ==
The building housing the academy is an example of architectural art from the 18th century. It was constructed from 1766 to 1777 by the architect Rastrelli as a palace for the Governor-General on the site formerly belonging to the manor of Count Davier. Since 1805 and until 1958, one of the first universities in the country, the University of Kharkov (presently V.N. Karazin Kharkiv National University) had been located in it.

In 1958, Ukrainian Correspondence Polytechnic Institute (UCPI) was founded in this building, in accordance with Order No. 62 of the Council of Ministers of Ukraine of 24 January 1958 and Order of Ministry of Higher Education of Ukraine No. 78 of 21 February 1958. In 1990, UCPI was renamed into Kharkiv Engineering and Pedagogical Institute (KEPI), and in 1994 it was further renamed into Ukrainian Engineering and Pedagogical Academy (UEPA). The library's name was changed according to the changes in the name of the academy itself. In 2010, according to the Decision of the Academic Council of the academy and Rector's Order No. 166 of 1 June 2010, the library's name was finally changed into "UEPA Scientific Library". The first librarians were N. D. Shagaeva, G. M. Savchenko, L. Y. Bogatova, V. I. Sosipatrova, and others. P. S. Safronov was the first Director of the library. The Library's initial stock was granted by the library of Kharkov Polytechnic Institute.

== Structure of the Library ==
The structure of the Scientific Library's is represented by the following departments: scientific formation, processing and cataloging of library and information resources, scientific informational and bibliographic activities, scientific stock service, training stock service, scientific organization and storage of stock, sector of modern library and information technologies, branches of UEPA institutes in other cities: Educational and Scientific Professional Pedagogical Institute (Bakhmut, Slavyansk), Educational and Research Institute of Mining and Educational Technologies (Stakhanov).

== Bibliographical reference work ==
Reference and bibliographic system consists of the general alphabetical and systematic catalogs, and files and directories for the specific types of publications: journals, textbooks, publications, thesis synopsis, standards, certificates, patents and other copyright documents, and books in foreign languages. An electronic catalog containing more than 90,000 entries was organized in 1999. EC contains the "Book Supply" database published online in the form of special search fields. There are also separate reference databases such as "Patents and other copyright documents held by UEPA’s scientists" (880 listings), and "Works by the UEPA’s scientists" (10,168 listings).

== Scientific activities ==
The library's scientific activity includes the participation in research carried out in the instructional laboratory on engineering and teacher education in collaboration with the Institute of Pedagogical Education and Adult Education of Ukraine; participation in the annual scientific conference of scientific and teaching staff, researchers, graduate students and UEPA staff regarded as a separate section entitled "Modern Information and Library Technologies"; organization of scientific conferences, seminars, and round tables.

Bibliographical activity of the Scientific Library includes the creation and constant update of the interactive electronic scientific bibliography entitled "Problems of Modern Education" (annually in 2 vol.), "Innovations in Education" (annually), bibliographies on the issues of education and engineering pedagogy; it also includes the maintenance of bio-bibliographies of "Anniversaries of UEPA Scientists" series.

== The introduction of new information technologies ==
The participation in corporate projects includes "The System of Ukrainian Scientific Literature Synopsys" which contributes to the formation of the national abstracts database entitled "Ukrainika Naukova"; publication of professional series of the Ukrainian synopsis journal "Djerelo", and support for online access to the full-text database "Scientific Periodicals of Ukraine" created by the V. I. Vernadsky National Library of Ukraine. The Library contributes by providing abstract and analytical information (list of articles from periodicals) to the industrial informational resource of the V.O. Sukhomlinsky National Scientific Pedagogical Library. As a part of the «E-Catalog of Ukraine" project, the Library is provided with web-hosting in the Internet. Since 2012, the Scientific Library has joined the following projects: corporate cataloging project of the Slavic Kyril and Methodius Dnipropetrovsk Region Universal Scientific Library entitled "Pridneprovsky Corporate Directory", and Ohio State University Contribution to the Parliament of Ukraine (Legislative Policy Development Program II)”.

The introduction of new information technologies started out in 1999. The library won a grant with the "Renaissance" fund and Open Society Institute and initiated the creation of the EC in ALIS «Liber-Media". Since 2006, the Library has been operating in ALIS "Irbis". The processes of acquisition, cataloging, and circulation are automated. The Library's site has been operating since 2007, providing access to the online catalog, ElAr UIPA electronic archive (repository), and the "Engineering and Pedagogical Education” target resource. The library's readers have Internet access on PC workstations and via Wi-Fi technology.

Significant contribution to the development of the library was made by Directors of the Library G.M. Ivanova (1965–1982), L. S. Tsimbal (1982–2004), Methodist V.I. Sosipatrova (1959–2009). For a long time Director G. M. Ivanova had been a member of the Republican scientific and methodical commission by the Ministry of Higher Education of Ukraine and a member of the intercollegiate methodical association. Later, these functions were performed by L. S. Tsimbal. Since 2004, the library has been headed N. M. Nikolaenko.

Today the Scientific Library of UEPA is seeking new approaches to readers’ service, improving its operations, and expanding the range of library and information services online.

== See also ==
- List of libraries in Ukraine

== List of sources ==
1. Bagaley, D. History of Kharkiv 250 years of its existence (1655–1905): a historical monograph: In 2 vol. Vol.1 [Text] / D. Bagaley, D. P. Miller. – Reprint ed. – Moscow, |1993|. – |568| p.
2. Tsymbal, L.S. The Library of the Ukrainian Engineering and Pedagogical Academy [Text] / L. S. Tsymbal // Encyclopedia of Modern Ukraine. – K., 2003. – Vol. 2: B-Bio. – P. 716.
3. Tsymbal, L.S. The way of 40 years. The Library of the Ukrainian Engineering – Pedagogical Academy [Text] / L.S. Tsymbal, V.I. Sosipatrova // The History of Education Libraries in Ukraine: science collection / Pedagogical Sciences of Ukraine, the V. A. Suhomlinskogo national scientific pedagogic Library of Ukraine. – Moscow, 2006. – P. 262–274.
