= Andrii Shypko =

Ukrainian politician

- Андрій Шипко
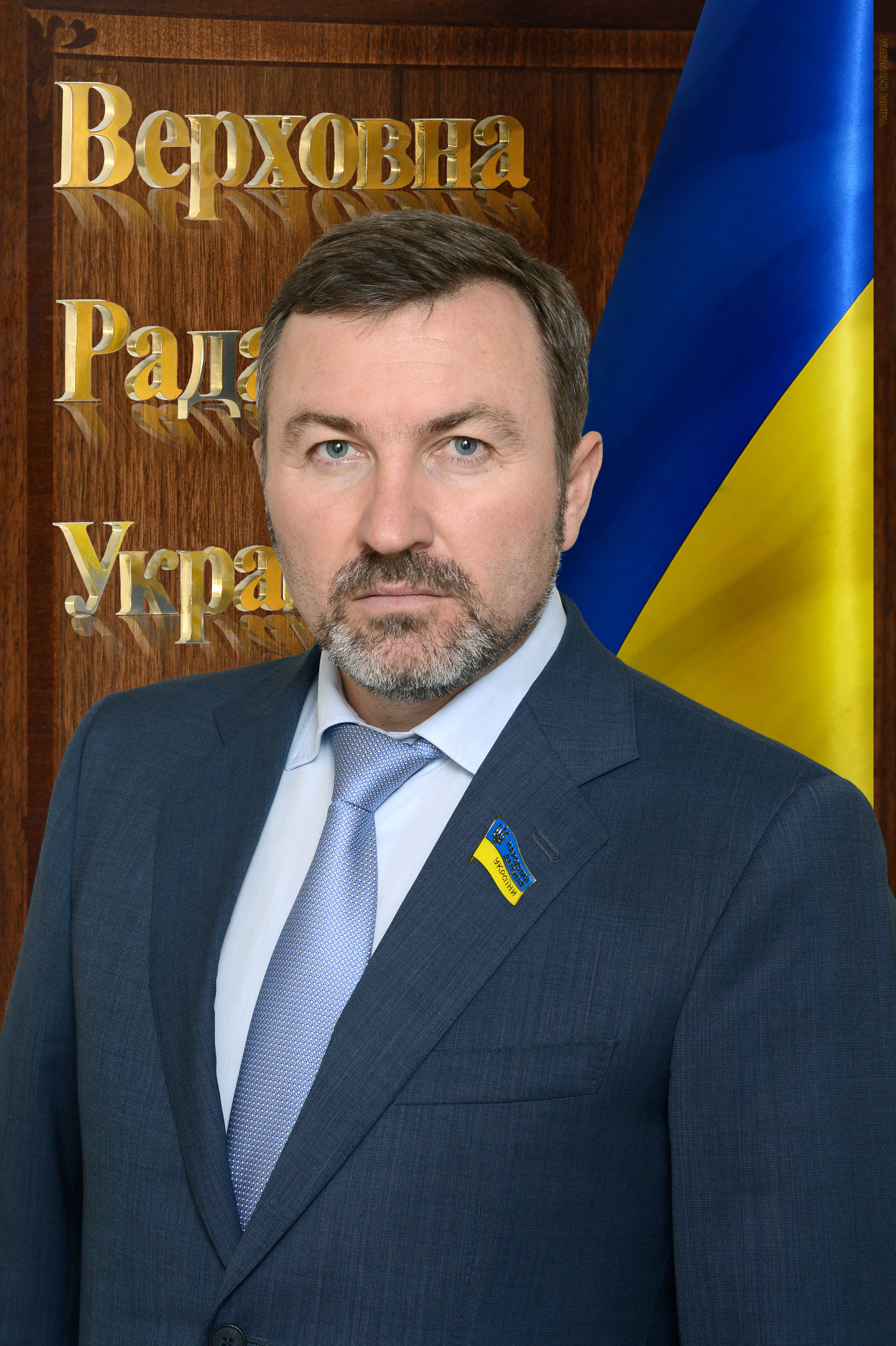

People's Deputy of Ukraine
- In office 12 December 2012 – 29 August 2019
- Preceded by: Constituency established
- Succeeded by: Denys Herman
- Constituency: Dnipropetrovsk Oblast, No. 35

Personal details
- Born: 26 March 1970 (age 56) Dnipropetrovsk, Ukrainian SSR, Soviet Union (now Ukraine)
- Education: Dnipropetrovsk State Medical Academy

Andrii Fedorovych Shypko (Ukrainian: Андрій Федорович Шипко; born 26 March 1970) is a Ukrainian politician who served as a People's Deputy of Ukraine of the 7th and 8th Ukrainian Verkhovna Rada.

== Bibliography ==
Andrii Shypko was born on March 26, 1970, in Dnipro (then named Dnipropetrovsk).

- In 1987 — 1993 studied in Dnipropetrovsk State Medical Academy on specialty “podiatry”, got the qualification of a doctor-pediatrician.
- In 1993 — 1996 worked as a doctor in Dnipropetrovsk Region children’s hospital.
- In 1996 — 2006 had the managerial posts in public enterprises.
- In 2004 — 2007 studied in National University "Yaroslav the Wise Law Academy of Ukraine" according to the specialty “legal science”, got qualification of a lawyer.
- In 2006 — 2012 worked as a deputy head of Dnipropetrovsk Oblast Council.

== Political activity ==
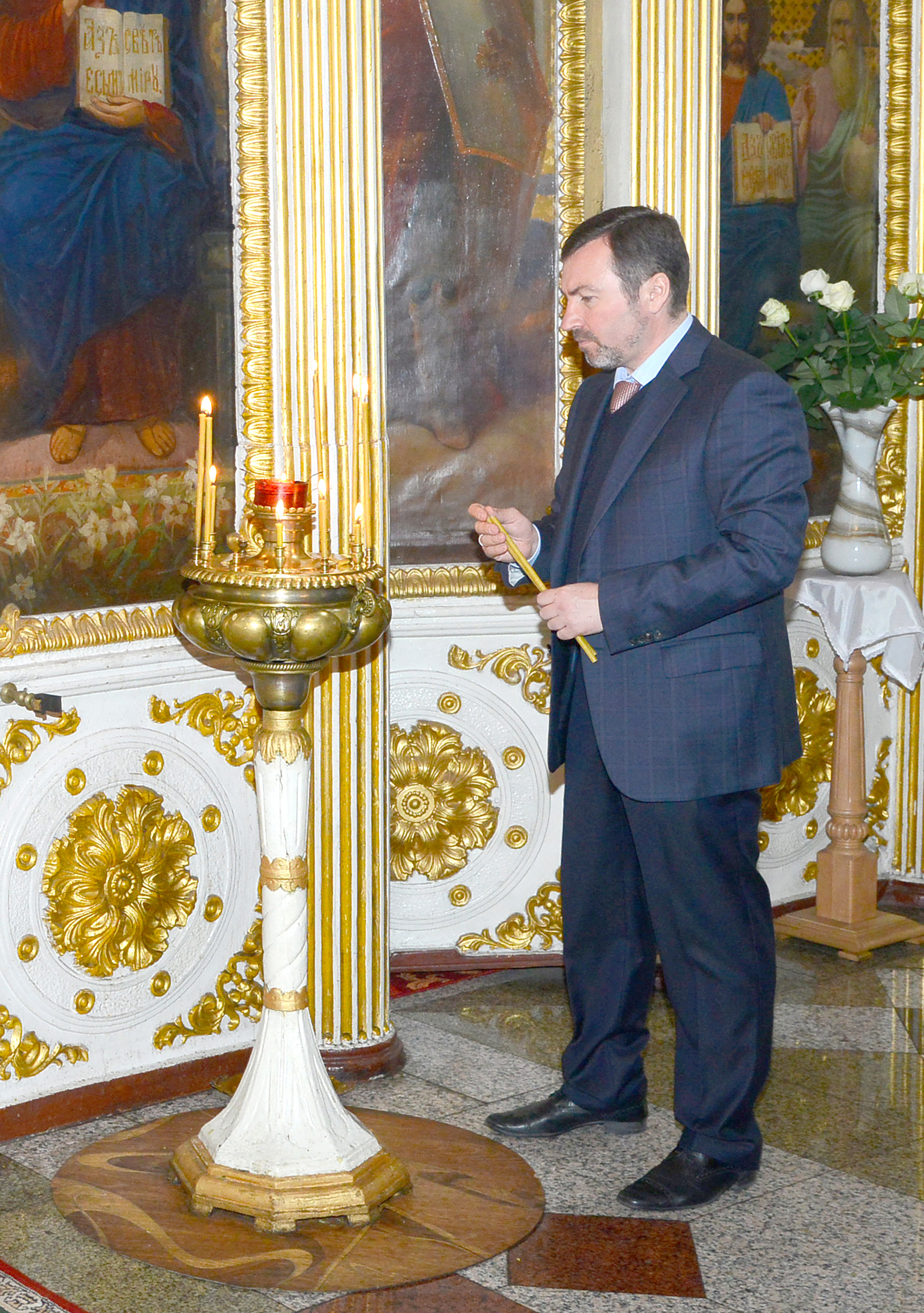
Andrii Shypko in church, 2014

During the parliamentary elections of 2012 Andrii Shypko got public maintenance at all without exception election palls of the 35th elections district, having got 43,52% votes as a member of Party of Regions. He was one of the 36 members of the Party of Regions faction (who consisted of 96 deputies) who voted in favour of the impeachment of President Viktor Yanukovych in February 2014. As a member of the Committee of Health Protection in the Verkhovna Rada he headed subcommittee of new medical technologies and pharmaceutical field. The deputy of the Verkhovna Rada (Ukraine's parliament) of the 7th and 8th convocations, both times was elected in single-member electoral district №35 – Dnipropetrovsk Oblast (Nikopol, Nikopol District, Pokrov). In the 2019 Ukrainian parliamentary election Shypko, as an independent politician, was reelected with 33% of the votes.

Member of the deputy group "Party of Renaissance".

In The Verkhovna Rada of Ukraine
fraction: a member of the parliamentary group of the political party "Revival"
position: a member of the Verkhovna Rada Committee on Health.

In the 2019 Ukrainian parliamentary election Shypko failed to get reelected in single-member electoral district №35; he gained 29.76% of the vote while winner Denys Herman of Servant of the People gained 46.89%.

== Family ==
Shypko is married and has three children.

== State awards ==
- Order of Merit III stage (2008)
- Order of Merit II stage (2013)
