= Oleg Serbin =

Ukrainian librarian and library administrator (born 1982)

Oleh Serbin
- Олег Олегович Сербін
- Born: March 26, 1982 (age 44); Boyarka, Kyiv Oblast, Ukrainian SSR, Soviet Union (now Ukraine)
- Citizenship: Ukraine
- Education: Kyiv National University of Culture and Arts
- Occupations: Librarian; academic administrator; researcher
- Employer: Yaroslav Mudryi National Library of Ukraine
- Website: nlu.org.ua

Oleh Serbin (Ukrainian: Олег Олегович Сербін; born 26 March 1982) is a Ukrainian librarian and academic specialising in library classification and systematization. Since June 2024 he has served as Director General of the Yaroslav Mudryi National Library of Ukraine; from 2014 to 2022 he was Director of the Maksymovych Scientific Library at Taras Shevchenko National University of Kyiv.

== Education ==
Serbin studied at the Kyiv National University of Culture and Arts, specialising in documentary communications and international information. He later completed postgraduate research at the Vernadsky National Library of Ukraine (NAS of Ukraine). He holds the degrees of Candidate of Historical Sciences and Doctor of Social Communications, and the academic rank of senior researcher.

== Career ==
From 2014 Serbin served as Director of the Maksymovych Scientific Library at Taras Shevchenko National University of Kyiv. He has taught courses related to information classification and systematization and has been affiliated with the Kyiv National University of Culture and Arts and Taras Shevchenko National University of Kyiv.

On 1 December 2022 he was appointed acting Director General of the Yaroslav Mudryi National Library of Ukraine; on 5 June 2024 he became Director General. He has represented Ukrainian libraries internationally, including events highlighting the sector’s work during Russia’s full-scale invasion.

Serbin has also served on the board and as section head within the Ukrainian Library Association.

== Research ==
Serbin’s research focuses on the development and use of library–bibliographic classification systems, the evolution of systematic catalogues, and representation of information-retrieval languages in web-oriented systems. He is the author of monographs and articles in these fields and is described as a leading specialist in classification and indexing in Ukraine.

== Name and romanization ==
Per MOS:UKR, the standard Ukrainian National system yields the form Oleh Serbin (not “Oleg Serbin”).

== Education ==
- 2000-2004 – The Kyiv National University of Culture and Arts, Department of Documentary Communications and International Information. Specialization: ”An expert of bibliology, manager of publishing activity”, a red diploma.
- 2004-2007 – Postgraduate study in The Vernadsky National Library of Ukraine, The National Academy of Sciences.
- 2008 – “Candidate of Historical Sciences” thesis, “History, modern state and prospects of development of the library-bibliographic classifications in Ukraine”
- 2009-2010 – Winner of a competition for young scientists’ research works of the National Academy of Sciences of Ukraine, receiving a grant of the National Academy of Sciences of Ukraine to conduct research work “Evolution of classifications of sciences and of the library-bibliographic classifications”.
- 2010-2012 – Winner of a contest for a grant of the National Academy of Sciences of Ukraine for young scientists, grant holder of the National Academy of Sciences of Ukraine.
- 2012 – Achieved the academic rank of “Senior Researcher”
- 2016 – Earned “Doctor of Social Communications” thesis subject, “Library systematization of scientific information: theoretical and methodological principles of development”

== Professional activities ==
- 2001 – bibliographer of the department of State current bibliography guide in the Ivan Fedorov Book Chamber of Ukraine
- 2002-2004 – in the Kyiv National University of Culture and Arts at the software engineer position of the book science and publishing activity department and later as a senior laboratory assistant of professional orientation work department
- 2003 – researcher of the Department of State current bibliography guide in the Ivan Fedorov Book Chamber
- 2004 – head of the department of State current bibliography guide in the Ivan Fedorov Book Chamber
- 2006 – junior researcher and acting researcher at Vernadsky National Library of Ukraine (VNLU) in the department of development and support of electronic catalog in the Center of computer technologies.
- 2008 – a thesis defense for Candidate of Historical Sciences degree, thesis: “History, modern state and prospects of development of the library-bibliographic classifications in Ukraine”.
- 2009 – researcher at VNLU
- 2010 – senior researcher at Institute of Library Science of VNLU. Published monograph: “Library and bibliographic classifications: historical evolution and current trends of development”.
- 2011 – acting Head of the Department of Systematization of VNLU.
- 2013 – spearheads the department of the scientific processing of documents in VNLU. Taught a special course “Scientific classification” and “Modern systematization of information” as associate professor of the department of Bibliology and library science for The Kyiv National University of Culture and Arts.
- December 1, 2014 – Director of The Maksymovych Scientific Library of the Taras Shevchenko National University of Kyiv.
- From December 1, 2022 – Director General of the Yaroslav Mudryi National Library of Ukraine.

== Social activities ==
From 2006 to 2014, Serbin worked in structure of organizational committee of scientific conferences and working groups on the improvement of library processes. Beginning in 2009, he became a vice-chairman of the trade-union committee and a vice-chairman of the Council of Young Scientists of VNLU. In 2010, he became a Plenipotentiary Representative of VNLU as part of the Technical Committee of Standardization "Information and documentation" (TC 144) of the Ukrainian Institute of Scientific, Technical and Economic Information.

In March 2015, he became a leader of The University Libraries Section of The Ukrainian Library Association.

== Selected bibliography ==
- Serbin O. Information systematization in the context of classifications of sciences evolution: monograph./ Oleg Serbin. -K.: PPC “The Kyiv University”, 2015. – 431 p. (published in Ukrainian)
- Serbin O. Library and bibliographic classifications: historical evolution and modern development tendencies/ NAS of Ukraine; The Vernadsky National library of Ukraine/ Oleksij Semenovych Onishchenko (scientific editor). –K.: NJUV, 2009. – 139 p. (published in Ukrainian)
- Serbin O. Increase in efficiency of search tools in the context of indexing of information resources / Oleg Serbin // Sci. pr. of the Vernadsky National Library of Ukraine. - K., 2013. - N 35. - P. 39 - 48. (published in Ukrainian)
- Serbin O. Condition of library classifications in Ukraine: reliability of realities — in realness of hopes / Oleg Serbin // Scientific and technical libraries. — 2013. — N 6. — P. 76 — 83. (published in Russian)
- Serbin O. Development of classification systems as a research object, in the aspect of evolution and optimization of information systematization / Oleg Serbin // Bulletin of the Odesa National University / Series "Library Science. Bibliography. Book Science." - 2012. – Vol. 17, Iss. 2 (8). - P. 134–140. (published in Russian)
- Serbin O. Systematic character and systematization of information organization as basic reflection principles of scientific knowledge within modern library catalog//Oleg Serbin // Lib. bull. - 2012. - N 2. P. 3–10. (published in Ukrainian)
- Serbin O. Historical and technological features of evolution of the systematic library catalog: experience of the future in the past novelty/Oleg Serbin // Lib. bull. - 2012. - N 4. - P. 3–12. (published in Ukrainian)
- Serbin O. Knowledge management system as a part of science creation/ Oleg Serbin // Sci. pr. of the Vernadsky National Library of Ukraine. - K., 2011. - N 32. - P. 349 - 357.(published in Ukrainian)
- Serbin O. Table of concordances of the abridged versions of UDC and LBC as a sample of consolidation attempt of differently structural classification systems/ Oleg Serbin // Lib. bul. - 2011.- N 4. - P. 29–32. (published in Ukrainian)
- Serbin O. Conceptual representation of triad objectification from a position of knowledge classification of stoics/Oleg Serbin // Book Chamber bulletin. - 2010. - N 1. - P. 37–42. (published in Ukrainian)
- Serbin O. Evolution of scholastic knowledge classification in emanation frames of theological doctrine/ Oleg Serbin // Sci. pr. of the Vernadsky National Library of Ukraine. - K., 2009. - N 23. - P. 27–34. (published in Ukrainian)
- Serbin O. Conglomerate of the information retrieval languages as a consolidating pattern of general regulation mechanism and search of bibliographic information/ Oleg Serbin // Lib. bul. – 2008. - N 1. - P. 3–10. (published in Ukrainian)
- Serbin O. Reading systematization as a consequence of formation of the classification system (by way of example of classification of sciences by Hugh of sain Victor)/ Oleg Serbin // Book Chamber bul. 2009. - N 8. - P.33-37. (published in Ukrainian)

Note: all originals are printed in Cyrillic alphabet.

== See also ==
- Vernadsky National Library of Ukraine
- Kyiv National University of Culture and Arts
- Library

== Sources ==
- Administration in the Maksymovych Scientific Library of the Taras Shevchenko National University of Kyiv
- Technical Committee for Standardization "Information and documentation" (TC 144)
- Biography of O. Serbin, Vernadsky National Library of Ukraine
- In the Kyiv National University of Culture and Arts Informatsiologs and analysts will be prepared on YouTube (in Ukrainian)
- Library-bibliographic classification
- Antonina Holovaschuk. Amid the quiet bookshelves. (in Ukrainian)
- About Serbin O.O It is surely necessary to live in the work and for work" (in Ukrainian)
- Google Scholar
- Section of the University Libraries of the Ukrainian Library Association
