= Maksymovych Scientific Library =

Library of Kyiv University since 1834

Coordinates: 50°26′35.27″N 30°30′43.95″E

The Maksymovych Scientific Library
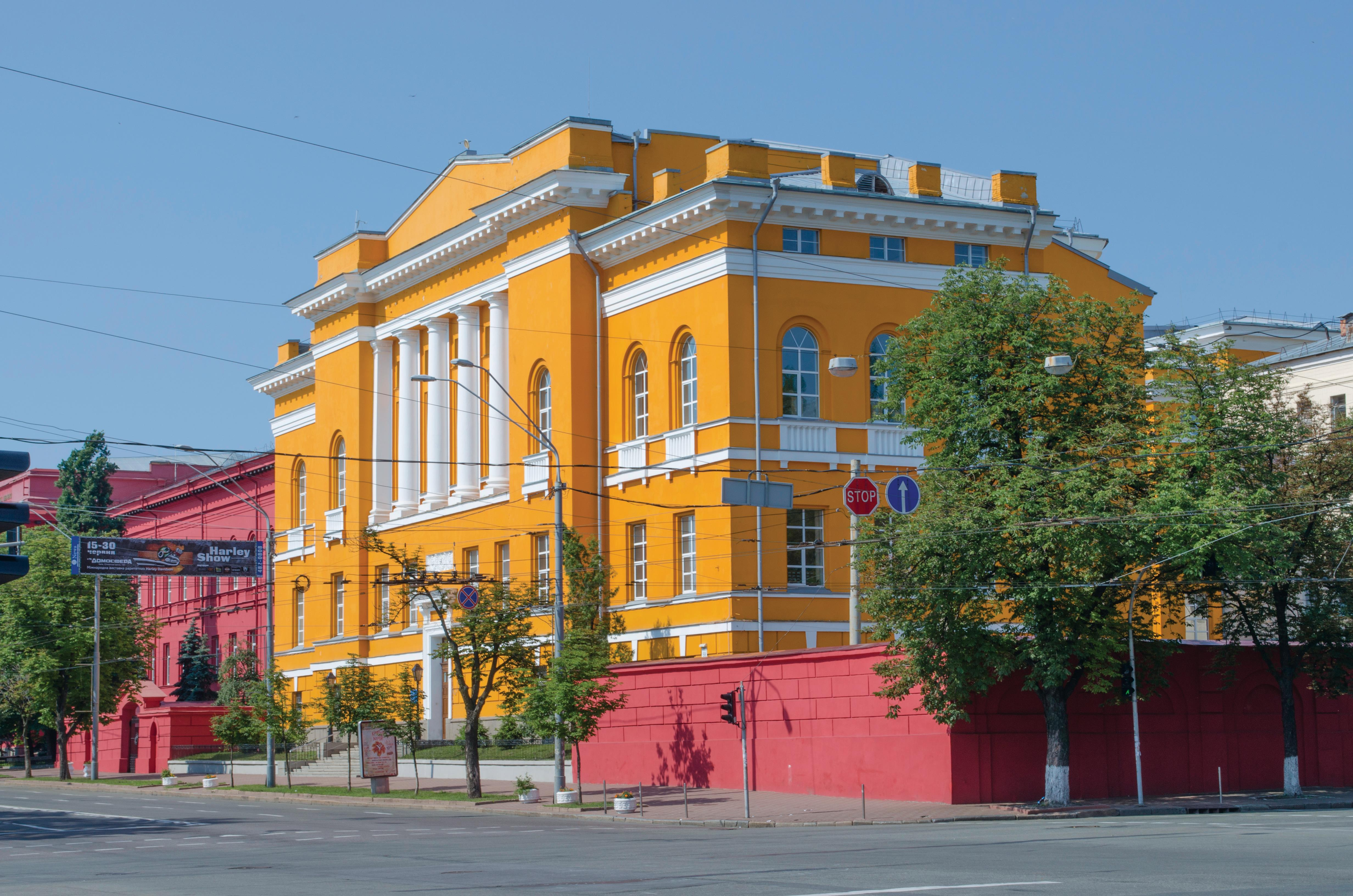
- Location: Kyiv, Ukraine, Volodymyrska str., 58
- Type: University
- Established: 1834

Collection
- Size: 3,5 million units of storage

Other information
- Director: Serbin Oleg Olegovych
- Website: Home page, Facebook

The Maksymovych Scientific Library is the main scientific library of the Taras Shevchenko National University of Kyiv. The library is located in Kyiv, Volodymyrska str., 58 near the Red building of the University of Kyiv and it was founded in 1834 along with the University.

== History ==
The library was founded together with the University in 1834. The basis of the library became a so-called «Kremenetska collection», that was a collection of books in 34 378 volumes. The construction of the university Library was built in 1939-1940 in the neoclassical style by such architects as Vasyl Osmak and Pavlo Aleshin as a humanitarian building of the university. In 1940, the university Library acquired a status of scientific. Then its stocks were more than 1 million volumes. During the Second World War the Library continued its work for a while. Some part of the books was confiscated by the occupation authorities and taken to Germany, another part of the stock was damaged by fire in 1943. The Library renewed its work on January in 1944. In 1983, the room of rare books was created. In 1994, the scientific library was appropriated the name of Mykhailo Maksymovych, the first chancellor of the University of Kyiv.

== Stocks ==
Book stocks comprise 3.5 million copies and occupy more than 6,000 square meters. The library is filled up with scientific, educational, reference, methodical, periodical and other literature in more than 30 languages of the world. Annually the library stocks are filled up on 35000-40000 volumes. The room of rare books contains more than 7000 unique editions. «The collection of scientific works» has about 8000 titles of monographs, textbooks, training aids of the university authors from the day of foundation of the University of St. Volodymyr.

== The Rare Books Stock ==
The stock of the old printed books, rare and valuable books is one of the most valuable achievements of the library. The collection of the old printed books has more than 7 thousand of titles, the basis of which consists of publications on philosophy, religion and history. About 80% of the old printed books are printed in foreign languages. Mostly they are printed in ancient European languages, Latin, Hebrew, ancient Greek, old Bulgarian. The basis of the stock of the old printed books consists from the books of the 16th–17th centuries printed in Europe. There are the most widely represented editions of the following countries as: Austria, Great Britain, Belgium, Italy, Portugal, France. There are editions of printing dynasties of the Al'divs, the Etiennes, the Elzevirs, the Plantains widely known in medieval Europe. Incunabula is a pearl of the stock of the old printed books, published in Venice in 1497 (by a colophon). The book is printed in Latin and it is the edition of "The Lives of the Twelve Caesars" by Suetonius with comments of Marco Antonio Sabellika and Philip Beroaldo. The rare old printed books of the first half of the 16th century — paleotypes are considered to be an adornment of the library stock. The oldest of them dates back to 1519 year. This is a rare relic of the old printed book and ancient Bulgarian language, “The Missal” was published by hieromonk Pahomiy, issued in Venice in Bozhydar Vucovych printing house in 1519. Another interesting exhibit is meant to be the first edition of «The History of Sicilian tyrants» by Hugo Falkanda, which was published in 1550 in Paris in printing house of Maturin Dyup'yuyi. Among the collection of the old printed books, published in the second half of the 16th-17th centuries, such editions are distinguished as: «The Altar Gospel», published by the Moscow printer Petr Timofeevich Mstislavets, — issued in Vilno in 1575. There is a book of a great value of Pamvo Berynda “"Leksikonъ slavenorωsskyiy"”, which was published in 1653 in the printing house of the Kutein abbey (Kuteini village in Byelorussia).The dictionary of Pamvo Berynda is one of the first dictionaries of national language on the ground of Ukraine. There is also one of the rare editions in Old Ukrainian language in the Library, the book of Cyril Trankvilion “The Multivaluable Pearl”, issued in Mogilev in 1699 in printing house of Maxim Voshanka. Full-text versions of book relicts are represented in the database «Old Printed Books»

== Structure ==
The library has 13 departments, 17 sectors, 19 lending libraries, 23 reading rooms. Main departments and sectors:

- 1. Administrative and managerial personnel
- 2. Scientific and methodical department
- 3 .Department of documents’ acquisition
- 4. Department of scientific documentary processing and organization of catalogues
- 5.Information and bibliographic department
- 6. Department of cultural and educational work
- 7. Department of storage of stocks
- 8. Department of rare books and manuscripts
- 9. Service department of educational literature
- 10. Service department of scientific literature
- 11. The branch service department of the natural, economic and preparatory faculties, the Faculty of Sociology and Psychology, the Institute of Continuing Education, and the Training and Scientific Center of "the Institute of Biology" and the hostels’ libraries
- 12. Department of Information Technology and computer providing
- 13. The branch service department of the Institute of International Relations and the Institute of Journalism

== See also ==
- List of libraries in Ukraine
