= Tetyana Pertseva =

Ukrainian physician and academic administrator

Rector of Dnipro State Medical University

Personal details
- Education: Dnipro State Medical University
- Occupation: Pulmonologist, physician-scientist, academic administrator
- Awards: Order of Princess Olga

Tetyana Oleksiivna Pertseva (Ukrainian: Тетяна Олексіївна Перцева) is a Ukrainian pulmonologist, physician-scientist, and academic administrator. She is the rector of the Dnipro State Medical University and editor-in-chief of Medičnì Perspektivi. Pertseva is an elected academician of the National Academy of Sciences of Ukraine.

== Life ==
Pertseva completed a Doctor of Sciences in Medicine with honors at the Dnipro State Medical University in 1975. She worked as a therapist until 1980. She was a clinical resident and assistant from 1980 to 1983. She defended her Candidate of Sciences thesis in 1984. In 1988, she became an associate professor. From 1992 to 2016, Pertseva headed the department of family therapy and endocrinology which later reorganized into the department of internal medicine. She became a professor in 1993. Pertseva defended her doctoral thesis in 1994. She specialized in pulmonology and internal medicine. From 1992 to 1993, she was the dean of the medical faculty. She was the second vice-rector for academics from 1993 to 1996, when she became the vice-rector for academics. Pertseva was awarded the Order of Princess Olga, third degree. In 2003, she was elected as a corresponding member of the National Academy of Sciences of Ukraine (NASU). From 2004 to 2017, Pertseva was the first vice-rector of the university. She is the rector of the university. In 2021, she was elected academician of NASU. Pertseva is the editor-in-chief of the medical journal, Medičnì Perspektivi.
