= Serbin (surname) =

Serbin (Ukrainian: Сербін; Russian: Сербин) is a Slavic masculine surname. Its feminine counterpart is Serbina. It may refer to:

- Mykhailo Serbin (born 2003), Ukrainian Paralympic swimmer
- Nina Serbina (born 1951), Ukrainian high jumper
- Oleg Serbin (born 1982), Ukrainian librarian
- Svitlana Serbina (born 1980), Ukrainian diver
