= Ukrainian Engineering Pedagogics Academy =

Ukrainian academiy in Kharkiv

- ННІ «Українська інженерно-педагогічна академія» ХНУ ім. В.Н.Каразіна
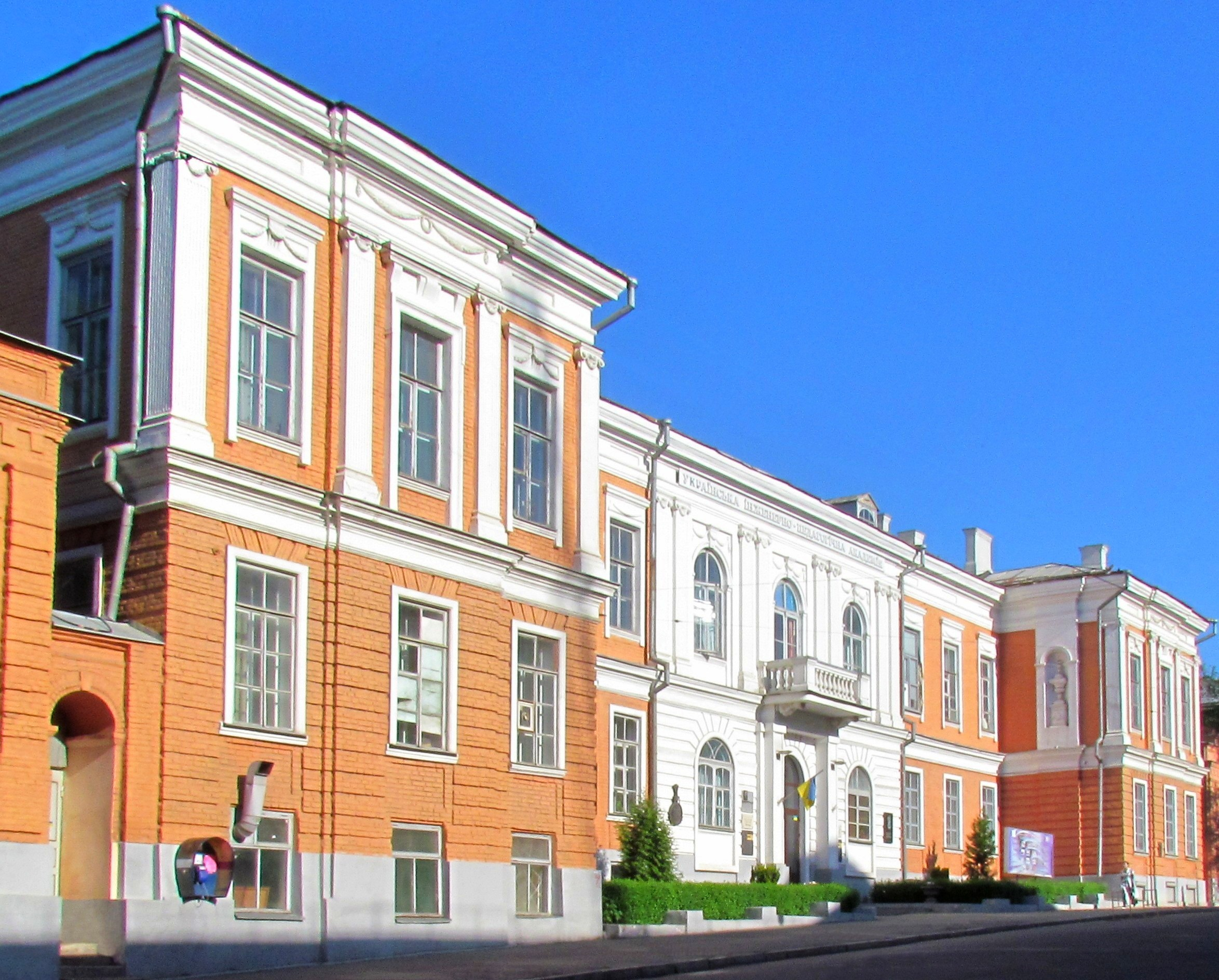
- Established: 1958
- Affiliations: VN Karazin Kharkiv National University
- Rector: Olena Kovalenko
- Students: 10,404
- Location: Kharkiv, 16 Universytetska Street, Kharkiv; Sloviansk; Kadiivka, 61003, Ukraine; 48.3042°N 38.0181°E (Kharkiv campus)
- Campus: Urban
- Website: uipa.edu.ua

The Ukrainian Engineering Pedagogics Academy (abbr. UEPA, Ukrainian: Навчально-науковий інститут «Українська інженерно-педагогічна академія» Харківського національного університету імені В.Н.Каразіна) is a Ukrainian academy in Kharkiv.

== History ==
On 24 January 1958, UEPA was founded firstly as Ukrainian Extramural Polytechnic Institute (UEPI). In 1990, UEPI was transformed into the Kharkov Engineering Pedagogics Institute (KEPI). In 1994, the academy received IV accreditation level and the status of Ukrainian Engineering Pedagogics Academy (UEPA).

== Campuses and buildings ==
The campus consists of the following facilities:

- The main building, including the Rector's office and administration;
- The 1st building, including power engineering, technological faculties, and the faculty of computer technologies in management and education;
- The 2nd building, including the faculty of international educational programs, faculty of integrated technologies in production and education, scientific library, and reading hall;
- The 3rd building, including the admissions department, sports hall, and gym;
- The 4th building, including the faculty of economic, administrative and educational technologies, concert hall, and canteen;
- Stadium;
- Three hostels.

== Institutes and faculties ==
The academy includes:

- Two institutes:
  - Educational-Scientific Professional-Pedagogics Institute which is situated in Bakhmut and Slaviansk cities;
  - Stakhanov Educational-Scientific Institute of Mining and Educational Technologies.
- Five faculties:
  - power engineering faculty;
  - faculty of economic, administrative and educational technologies;
  - technological faculty;
  - faculty of international educational programs;
  - faculty of integrated technologies in production and education.

== Honorable Doctors and famous alumni ==
- Mostovyi, P. I. – minister, head of the State Committee of Material resources of USSR;
- Yefremov, V.P. – bonding minister of USSR;
- Topolov, V.S. – minister of coal industry of USSR;
- Potapov, V.I. – deputy of Verkhovna Rada of Ukraine;
- Reva, D.A. – deputy of Verkhovna Rada of Ukraine.

== Awards and reputation ==
UEPA has received the following ratings:

- Rating of the universities of Ukraine "Top-200 Ukraine" 2007 – the 77th place;
- Rating of the higher education establishments from UNESCO "Top-200 of Ukraine" 2011 – the 74th place;
- Rating of the higher educational establishments of Ukraine «Compass 2011» – general rating – the 10th place;
- Rating of the higher education establishments of Ukraine «Compass 2012» – the summary rating – the 10th place;
- Rating of the official publication of the Ministry of Education, Science, Youth and Sports «Education of Ukraine» 2012 – global criterion of rating (IPI) in the groups of pedagogical, humanitarian, physical training and sports of the higher educational establishments – 0.895;
- Rating of the newspaper "Segodna" 2012 – the 10th place among the higher educational establishments with the best training on engineering specialties, IT specialties, on economic preparation.

== See also ==
List of universities in Ukraine
