= Access to public information in Ukraine =

Access to public information and freedom of information (FOI) refer to the right of access to information held by public bodies also known as "right to know". Access to public information is considered of fundamental importance for the effective functioning of democratic systems, as it enhances governments' and public officials' accountability, boosting people participation and allowing their informed participation into public life. The fundamental premise of the right of access to public information is that the information held by governmental institutions is in principle public and may be concealed only on the basis of legitimate reasons which should be detailed in the law.

On 13 January 2011, the Verkhovna Rada (the Parliament of Ukraine) adopted two laws on access to information: The Law of Ukraine “On Access to Public Information” and the new wording of the Law of Ukraine “On Information” (1992). They entered into force on May 9, 2011.

The Art. 5 of the Law of Ukraine "On Information" provides the «right for information» which includes the possibility of free collection, usage, distribution, storage and protection of information necessary for the exercise of person’s rights, freedoms and legitimate interests.

Both of the laws were criticized in 2012 by the London-based association advocating for free expression Article 19, which considered that they lack provisions to ensure that the rights to privacy and freedom of expression and information are appropriately balanced.

On April 9, 2015, the Ukrainian Parliament approved a law to encourage government agencies to release and provide more information from the country’s archive of Soviet-era KGB files. The information would be transferred to the Institute of National Remembrance and be declassified. Moreover, the same law encourages to publish free operational data, statistics and reports on government websites and on the national open data web platform.

On March 27, 2014, the Parliament of Ukraine passed the draft law No. 0947. According to experts, it makes a variety of improvements related to access to information. Among other things, fines are added for ungrounded refusals to disclose information, for an untimely or incomplete provision of information, or the provision of false information.

According to the Independent Reporting Mechanism (IRM) of the Open Government Partnership (OPG) organization published in 2016, Ukraine’s progress for improving access to information, corruption prevention mechanisms, and bringing citizens in government decision making is “truly impressive”- especially considering the difficult political situation. However, according to the IRM, the country fell short in delivering on promises made to improve government accountability and fight corruption. In particular, according to an expert, Ukraine needs to further open public contracting, including in publicly owned enterprises, and to bring more transparency to natural resource extraction. According to IRM, also, in its next OPG National Plan, Ukraine should provide for among its commitments for a system of electronic disclosure so that public officials’ assets are verifiable.

== See also ==
- List of libraries in Ukraine
- Open access in Ukraine to scholarly communication
