= Denys Herman =

Ukrainian politician (born 1981)

- Денис Герман
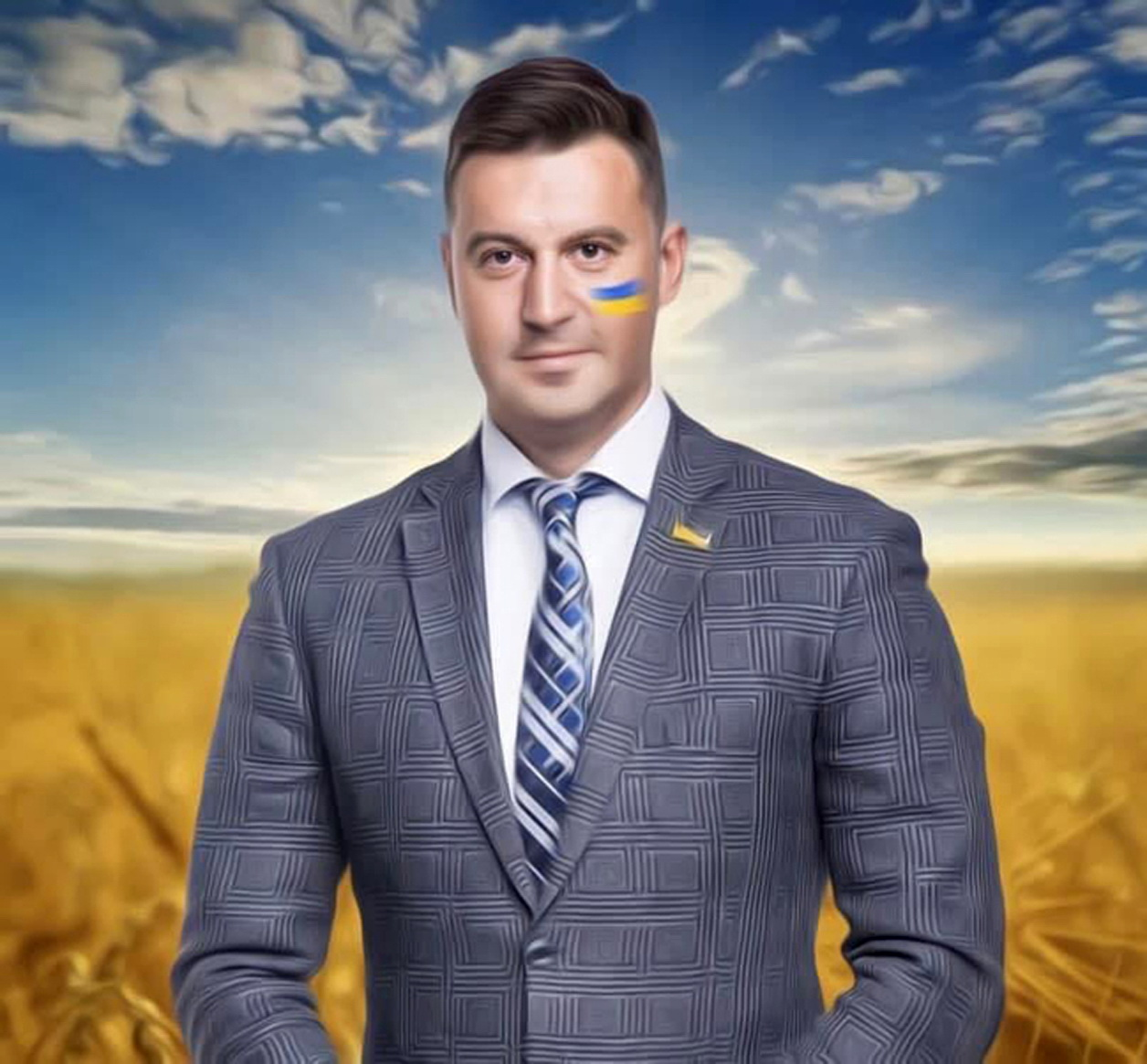

People's Deputy of Ukraine
- Incumbent
- Assumed office 29 August 2019
- Preceded by: Andrii Shypko
- Constituency: Dnipropetrovsk Oblast, No. 35

Personal details
- Born: 8 September 1981 (age 45) Dnipropetrovsk, Ukrainian SSR, Soviet Union (now Dnipro, Ukraine)
- Party: Servant of the People
- Other political affiliations: Independent
- Education: National Metallurgical Academy of Ukraine; National University of Kyiv-Mohyla Academy

Denys Vadymovych Herman (Ukrainian: Денис Вадимович Герман; born 8 September 1981) is a Ukrainian economist, entrepreneur and politician currently serving as a People's Deputy of Ukraine in the 9th Ukrainian Verkhovna Rada from Ukraine's 35th electoral district. He is a member of Servant of the People.

== Biography ==
Herman was born on 8 September 1981 in Dnipro (then known as Dnipropetrovsk), in southern Ukraine. He studied at school No. 67 in Dnipropetrovsk. In 2003, he graduated from National Metallurgical Academy of Ukraine specialising in heat engineering. Was obtaining the second higher education at the same educational institution from 2002 to 2004 in accounting and audit. Also graduated from National University of Kyiv-Mohyla Academy in "management of enterprises" and Kyiv-Mohyla Business School. He has a master's degree in business administration. Until 2017 he served as SEO of the chain stores "ProStor", having increased the size of the network by more than 3.5 times - up to 300 stores. Earlier worked as an economic and financial director in "UBC Group", also in the corporation "Avito" in Dnipro and "GlobalLogic Solutions" in Kharkiv. A manager of LLC "HERMAN CONSULTING" and LLC "Styl D". Herman in 2017, he began to individually engage in consulting for retail companies in the field of personal care products in the field of process efficiency and business management, financial management, and attracting investments.

== Political career ==
In 2019 was elected a People's Deputy of Ukraine in Ukraine's 35th electoral district (including the cities of Nikopol and Pokrov and Nikopol Raion) from Servant of the People. At the time of the election engaged in business activities and an independent living in Dnipro. Chairperson of the Sub-committee on Modern IT and Innovations in Budgeting Process of the Verkhovna Rada Budget Committee. He took part in the implementation of projects of digital solutions for public services implemented in a single portal of public services Diia. Co-chair of a group for inter-parliamentary relations with Slovenia.

== Family ==
Wife - Herman Oksana Valerievna. Sons: David, born in 2004 and Daniel, born in 2006.
