= National Library of Ukraine for Children =

Ukrainian library for children

- Національна бібліотека України для дітей
- Established: 1967
- Type: National Children's library
- Location: Kyiv, Ukraine
- Coordinates: 50.4709°N 30.4226°E
- Website: chl.kiev.ua/eng/chl_me_e.htm

The National Library of Ukraine for Children (Ukrainian: Національна бібліотека України для дітей, or Ukrainian: НБУ для дітей for short) is a Ukrainian National library specifically for children.

== History ==
The library was founded on 1 January 1967, as the State Republican Library for Children under the Ukrainian Soviet Socialist Republic. It changed names several times, in 1978 being named after the Leninist Komsomol, in 1993, after the Independence of Ukraine, renamed the State Library of Ukraine for Children (Ukrainian: Державна бібліотека України для дітей), and in 2003, the National Library of Ukraine for Children.

The library moved to its current location on 60 Janusz Korczak Street (at the time named Bauman street) in Kyiv in 1978. The building was designed by architects M. P. Budilovsky and I. A. Zeitlina. The building decorations were created by notable Ukrainian artists: Olga Rapay-Markish made library ceramic works including "The Fairytales of the World", "The History of Books and Book Printing", and others about the history of music and handicrafts, Oleksandr Mylovzorov made stained glass windows, Svitlana and Evgenia Kravchenko made tapestries, and Boris Dovgan made the arch by the entrance door and a bronze sculpture of a reading boy.

=== Directors ===
The librarian Anastasiya Kobzarenko worked as an inspector at the department of libraries concerning the functioning and development of libraries for children of the Ministry of Culture of the USSR from 1960 to 1966. She studied the system of library services for children in Ukraine when the Soviet Union was researching the issues of the reading of children, questioning whether State Republican Library for Children should be established, as a scientific and methodological centre to provide methodological and practical assistance to libraries serving children in Ukraine. She worked to determine how the development of a network of children's libraries should function.

From 1966, she heavily contributed to the creation of the State Republican Library for Children. Kobzarenko was appointed its director by the Ministry of Culture of the USSR in 1967. She oversaw the construction of the new library building: looking like an open-book and decorated with figured wrought-iron metal bars featuring photographs of animals and plants in the Nyvky residential area in Kyiv from 1976 to 1978.

Her activities focused on the development of the child's personality. This was based on a child's upbringing, social morality based on cultural and spiritual values, the values of the people, instillment of patriotism and national consciousness.

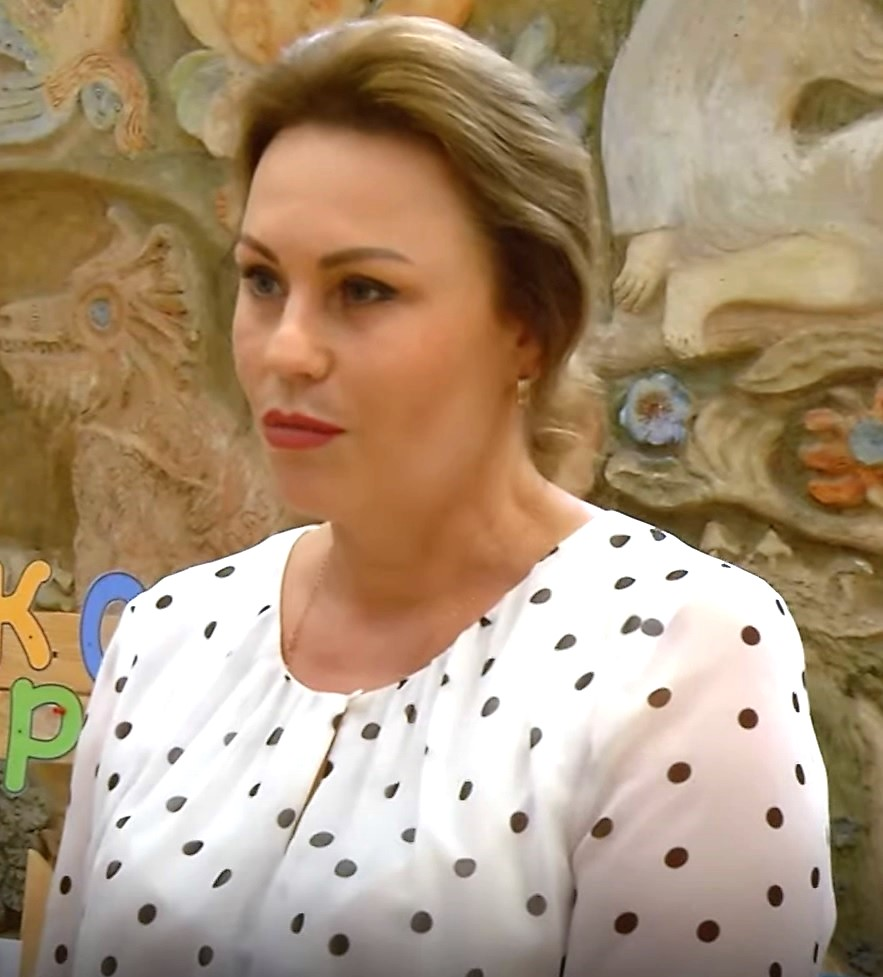
Alla Gordienko, Director of the Library, in 2022

Since 2013, the Library director has been Alla Gordienko.

The library became the National Library with the independence of Ukraine. It is Ukraine's main children's library, holding children's literature, scientific publications, bibliographies. It serves 22,000 thousand schools and 18,000 rural libraries for children as of 2011.

== See also ==
- List of libraries in Ukraine
