= Anastasiya Kobzarenko =

Ukrainian director, librarian and writer (1934–2022)

Anastasiya Kobzarenko HOU OS
- Анастасія Кобзаренко
- Born: Anastasiya Stepanivna Kobzarenko; 8 May 1934; Raiozero, Orzhytsia Raion, Poltava Oblast, USSR (now Ukraine)
- Died: 1 August 2022 (aged 88); Kyiv, Ukraine
- Occupations: Director; librarian; writer
- Years active: 1955–2022
- Organizations: National Library of Ukraine for Children
- Awards: Medal "For Labour Valour"; Medal "For Distinguished Labour"; Order of Princess Olga, Third Class; Hero of Ukraine

Anastasiya Stepanivna Kobzarenko (Ukrainian: Анастасія Степанівна Кобзаренко; 8 May 1934 – 1 August 2022) was a Ukrainian director, librarian, and writer. She began her career working as an instructor at the Lykhniv District Department of Culture of the Dnipropetrovsk Region and was librarian of Kryvyi Rih City Library No 4. in Kryvyi Rih, Dnipropetrovsk Oblast between 1955 and 1958. Kobzarenko was also an inspector at the Ministry of Culture of the USSR from 1960 to 1966 and director general of the State Republican Library for Children (today the National Library of Ukraine for Children) from the late 1960s to 2013. She authored more than twenty publications on library works and wrote more than 100 articles focusing on the problems faced by libraries. Kobzarenko was a 1998 recipient of the Order of Princess Olga, Third Class and was made a Hero of Ukraine in 2009.

== Early life ==
Kobzarenko was born in the village of Raiozero (today in the Orzhytsia Raion district), in the region of Poltava Oblast on 8 May 1934. Her family were working class peasants; her mother read to her old copies of the works of Taras Shevchenko, Panas Myrny and Ivan Nechuy-Levytsky. Following her graduation from the Dnipropetrovsk College of Adult Education in 1950, Kobzarenko went on to study and graduate from the correspondence department of the Kharkiv State Academy of Culture as a certified librarian in 1957.

== Career ==
Kobzarenko's working career commenced as an instructor at the Lykhniv District Department of Culture of the Dnipropetrovsk Region and was librarian of Kryvyi Rih City Library No 4. in Kryvyi Rih, Dnipropetrovsk Oblast between 1955 and 1958. From 1958 to 1960, Kobzarenko was the head of the book collection at the library of the House of Officers of Kaunas in Kaunas, Lithuania. She went on to work as an inspector at the department of libraries concerning the functioning and development of libraries for children of the Ministry of Culture of the USSR from 1960 to 1966. During this period, Kobzarenko studied the system of library services for children in Ukraine when the Soviet Union was researching the issues of the reading of children, questioning whether it should be establishing a State Republican Library for Children as a scientific and methodological centre to provide methodological and practical assistance to libraries serving children in Ukraine. She worked to determine how the development of a network of children's libraries should function.

From 1966, she heavily contributed to the creation of the State Republican Library for Children (today the National Library of Ukraine for Children). Kobzarenko was appointed director of the State Republican Library for Children on the instruction of the Ministry of Culture of the USSR in 1967. She oversaw the construction of the new open-book designed library building decorated with figured wrought-iron metal bars featuring photographs of multiple animals and plants in the Nyvky residential area (60 Bauman Street) in Kyiv from 1976 to 1978. Kobzarenko sought to have the finishing interior design materials imported from Ukraine and other Soviet republics. She acted as a consultant for the specifics of children's library services and took part in preparing the project.

Her activities focused on the development of the child's personality. This was based on their upbringing, the child's social morality based on cultural and spiritual values, the values of the people, instilment of patriotism and national consciousness. Kobzarenko provided new literature to libraries in rural areas. She launched the national Ukraine Reads To Children project that has the goal of increasing the awareness of reading in private educational institutions and at family homes as an important factor of the development of young children.

Kobzarenko authored more than twenty publications on library works. Such works include Modern trends in modern libraries of Ukraine, Childhood in the legislative space of social policy (1998) and Children's libraries: new times, new problems and opportunities (2001) among others. Kobzarenko was appointed chair of the all-Ukrainian public organisation Ukrainian Association of Library Workers for Children in 2000 with the objective to better information and library and bibliographic support for children. She was the founder and editor-in-chief of the professional scientific-methodical journal World of Children's Libraries in the early 2000s. Kobzarenko was frequently elected to serve as a deputy on Soviet district councils. She was editor-in-chief of the reference books "Library of Ukraine for Children" (2008) and Children's Librarians of Ukraine: One Hundred Best (2012). Kobzarenko wrote more than 100 articles on the problems facing libraries. She was President of the Ukrainian Association of Library Workers for Children and the Director General of the National Library of Ukraine children, standing down from both positions in 2013.

Kobzarenko died on 1 August 2022 at age 88.

== Legacy ==
Kobzarenko received the Medal "For Labour Valour" in 1970, and the Medal "For Distinguished Labour" the following year. Kobzarenko was appointed the honorary title of Honoured Worker of Culture of the Ukrainian SSR in 1979. In 1980, she received the bronze medal of the Medal VDNKh which was upgraded to the silver medal one year later. She became a recipient of the Badge "Excellence in Public Education of the USSR" in 1982; the Diploma of the Presidium of the Verkhovna Rada of the USSR in 1984; the Medal of Krupskaya in 1986; and the Diploma of the Second Degree VDNKh of the USSR in 1989.

On 30 September 1998, Kobzarenko received the Order of Princess Olga, Third Class from President Leonid Kuchma "for significant personal contribution to the development of librarianship, high professionalism". In 2002, she received the honorary For achievements in the development of culture and art award from the Ministry of Culture and Information Policy and a gratitude from the Mayor of Kyiv. President Viktor Yushchenko awarded Kobzarenko the Hero of Ukraine with the Order of the State on 19 August 2009 "for many years of selfless work in educating young people on the principles of spirituality, humanism and high morals." She received a Woman of the Year Award in 2011.
