= Yaroslav Mudryi National Library of Ukraine =

National library of Ukraine

Coordinates: 50°27′05″N 30°31′46″E

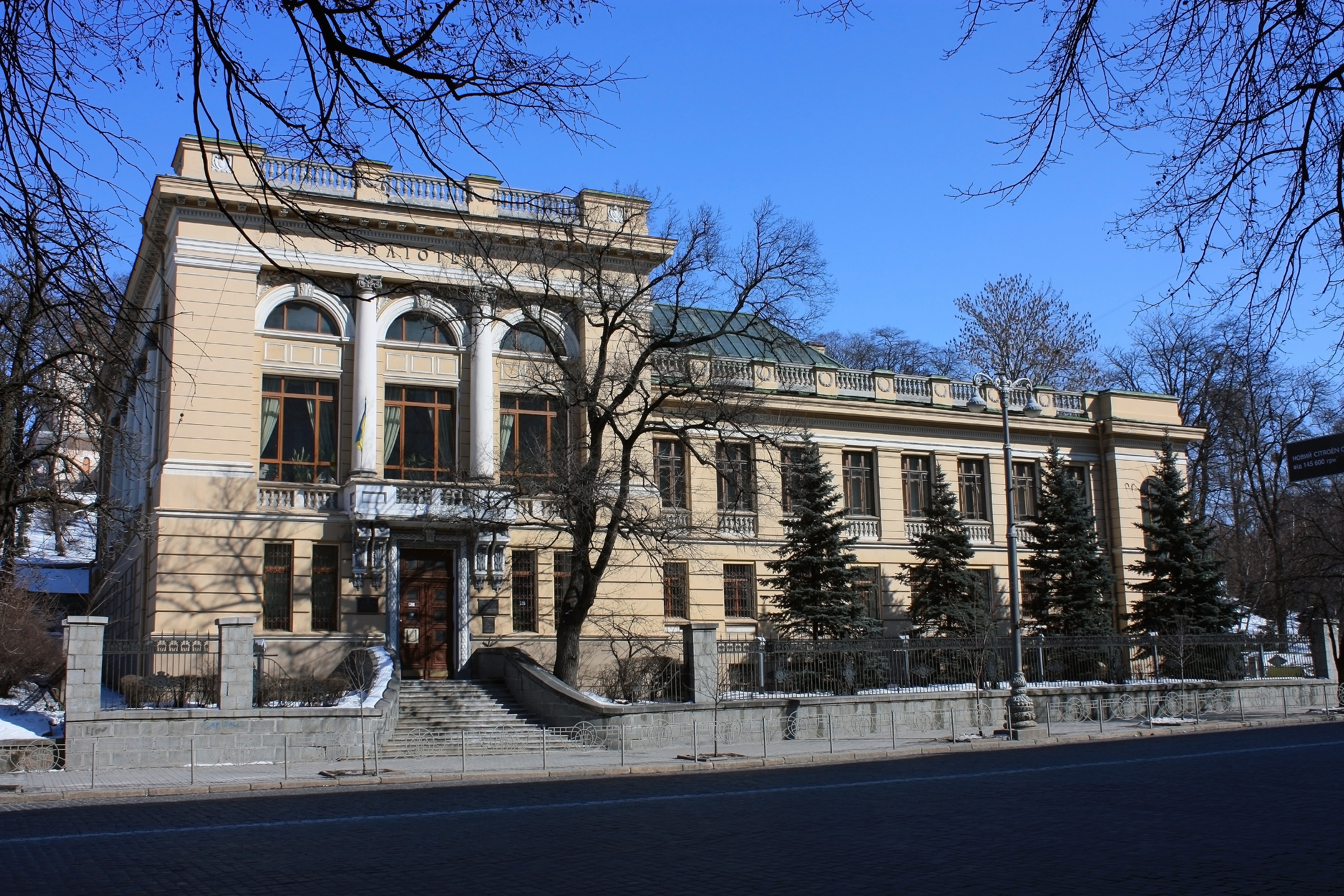
- Location: 1 Mykhaila Hrushevskoho Street, Kyiv, Ukraine
- Established: 3 March 1866
- Branches: 3

Collection
- Size: under 4,000,000 items

Other information
- Website: nlu.org.ua

The Yaroslav Mudryi National Library of Ukraine (Ukrainian: Національна бібліотека України імені Ярослава Мудрого, romanized: Natsionalna biblioteka Ukrainy imeni Yaroslava Mudroho) is one of the national libraries of Ukraine, one of the largest libraries of the country. It was opened in 1866 as the city's public library. The main building of the library is located on 1, Mykhaila Hrushevskoho Street on the European Square in the center of Kyiv. It is the central library of Ukraine's public library system and is a research institute of bibliography and library science.

As of 2015, the size of the funds amounted to about 4.7 million units.

== History ==
The library's building itself was built in 1911, by the architects Z. Kliave and A. Krivosheyev. The library itself was first founded in 1866. During the library's 140 years of existence, it has obtained over 4 million items in its collection (which started out as a private collection). During its existence, it has collated a large collection of early prints, and rare and valuable books.

During the Second World War, the library suffered serious damage and more than 50,000 publications were taken out from its stock. The library building was set on fire by retreating Nazi troops in November 1943, and during only one night of burning, the library lost more than 300,000 editions including 7,000 manuscripts, rare books and pre-revolutionary periodicals.

Since 1944, the library collection was rebuilt anew. In 1957, the library became the State Republican Library of the Ukrainian SSR named after the CPSU, a center of scientific, methodological, and bibliographic work for the mass libraries of the republic. The only one in Ukraine, it began to receive all-Union compulsory full copies of printed works in 1962 and was able to represent contemporary literature to the fullest extent possible.

In March 1966, the library was awarded the Order of the Red Banner of Labor for its services to the development of librarianship and on the occasion of its 100th anniversary.

After the declaration of independence in 1990, the library was renamed the State Library of Ukraine, and in 1994, according to a presidential decree, it was granted the status of a national library.

== See also ==
- List of libraries in Ukraine
