= Dnipro State Medical University =

Medical university in Dnipro, Ukraine

Coordinates: 48°27′40″N 35°03′24″E

- ДЗВО "Дніпровський державний медичний університет"
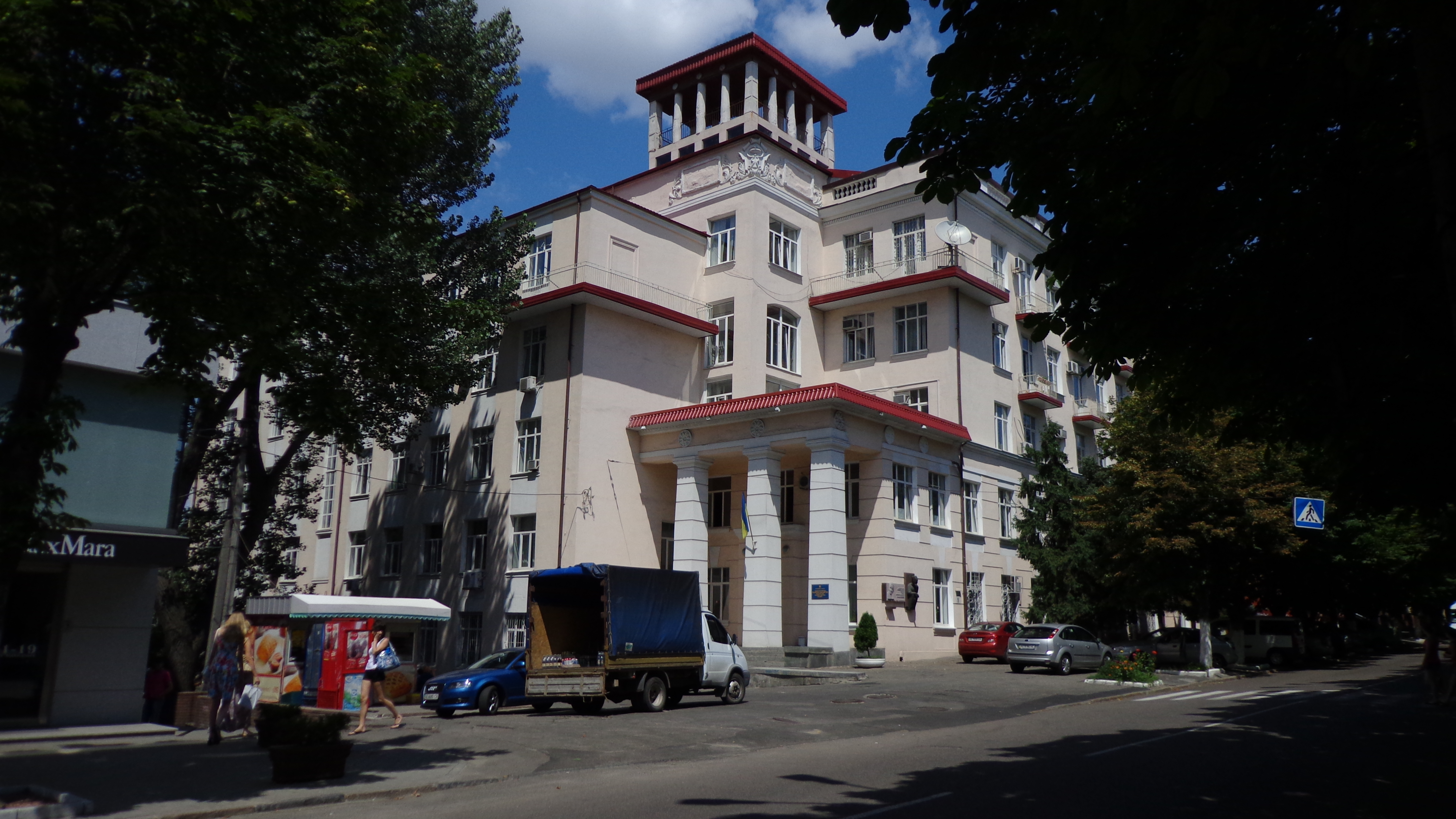
- Motto: Docendo discimus
- Type: public university
- Established: 1916
- Accreditation: Ministry of Education and Science of Ukraine
- Affiliations: Ministry of Health of Ukraine
- Rector: Tetyana Pertseva
- Students: 4,500
- Location: Dnipro, Ukraine
- Website: dmu.edu.ua; Official website
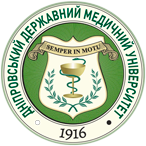

The Dnipro State Medical University (Ukrainian: Дніпровський державний медичний університет) is a state-sponsored university of higher education in Ukraine, Dnipro.

== History ==
Dnipro State Medical University was founded on September 15, 1916, from the Ekaterynoslavsky Higher Female Courses Institute. The institute acquired the status of State Academy in 1920 and it became the Dnipropetrovsk State Medical Academy (DSMA) in Ukraine in 1994, and became State Establishment "Dnipropetrovsk Medical Academy of Health Ministry Of Ukraine" in 2015. On March 16, 2021, the government of Ukraine through the Ministry of Health of Ukraine order # 473 ordered the name of the institution to be changed to Dnipro State Medical University.

== International Students ==
At present there are 2000 + International students studying in DSMA in Under graduate and Post graduate field. Foreign students study here in English Medium and are mostly from India, China, Pakistan, Afghanistan, Bangladesh, Nepal, Kuwait, Saudi Arabia, Egypt, Jordan, Yemen, Qatar, Oman, Morocco, Nigeria, Ghana, Kenya and 33 other countries from Asia, Africa and from Europe.

== Academics ==
It has 4500 students and since its creation has trained about 49,000 doctors, dentists, pharmacists and nurses. Since 1996, the head of the University has been Professor G.V. Dzyak. There is a wide post-graduate course, involving Ukrainian and foreign young doctors. The first supervisors of Ph.MD degree attendants from Arabic countries in medical academy were professors: Kryshen Valerii Pavlovich/surgery, Shkolnick Valerii Markovich/neurology, and Fedotov Valerii Pavlovich/dermatology/.

== See also ==
- Open access in Ukraine
- List of universities in Ukraine
- List of medical universities in Ukraine
