= Serbin Fashions =

American clothing company

Serbin Fashions Inc. (also known as Serbin of Miami & S&M Manufacturing Company) produced clothing lines under brand names like JO-RICH Originals Inc, Lincoln Manufacturing Company Inc, J.L.J. Corporation, Key Biscayne Hand Print Fabrics Inc., and Kitty Fischer and Roxbury Inc.

Serbin was a clothing manufacturer based in Fayetteville, Tennessee in Lincoln County. The original manufacturing facility in Fayetteville was opened in August 1937 as L.N. Gross & Company. In 1949, Lou & John Serbin, from Cleveland, Ohio, bought out L.N. Gross & Company and changed the name to Serbin. Lou ran the company until 1954, when James Marion Malone was promoted to vice president. Malone was promoted to President in 1958.

After the manufacturing business was shuttered in the early 1990s, the factory transitioned into a storage facility.
