= Open access in Ukraine =

Research open access

In Ukraine, a 2007 law requires open access publishing of research created through public funding. In January 2008, Ukrainian, Belarusian, and Russian academics issued the "Belgorod Declaration on open access to scientific knowledge and cultural heritage." Ukrainian academics issued another statement in June 2009 in support of open access.

== Repositories ==
There are a number of collections of scholarship in Ukraine housed in digital open access repositories. They contain journal articles, book chapters, data, and other research outputs that are free to read.

== See also ==
- Internet in Ukraine
- Education in Ukraine
- List of universities in Ukraine
- Media of Ukraine
- Science and technology in Ukraine
- Access to public information in Ukraine
- Open access in other countries
