= Vernadsky National Library of Ukraine =

Library in Kyiv, Ukraine

- Національна бібліотека України імені В. І. Вернадського
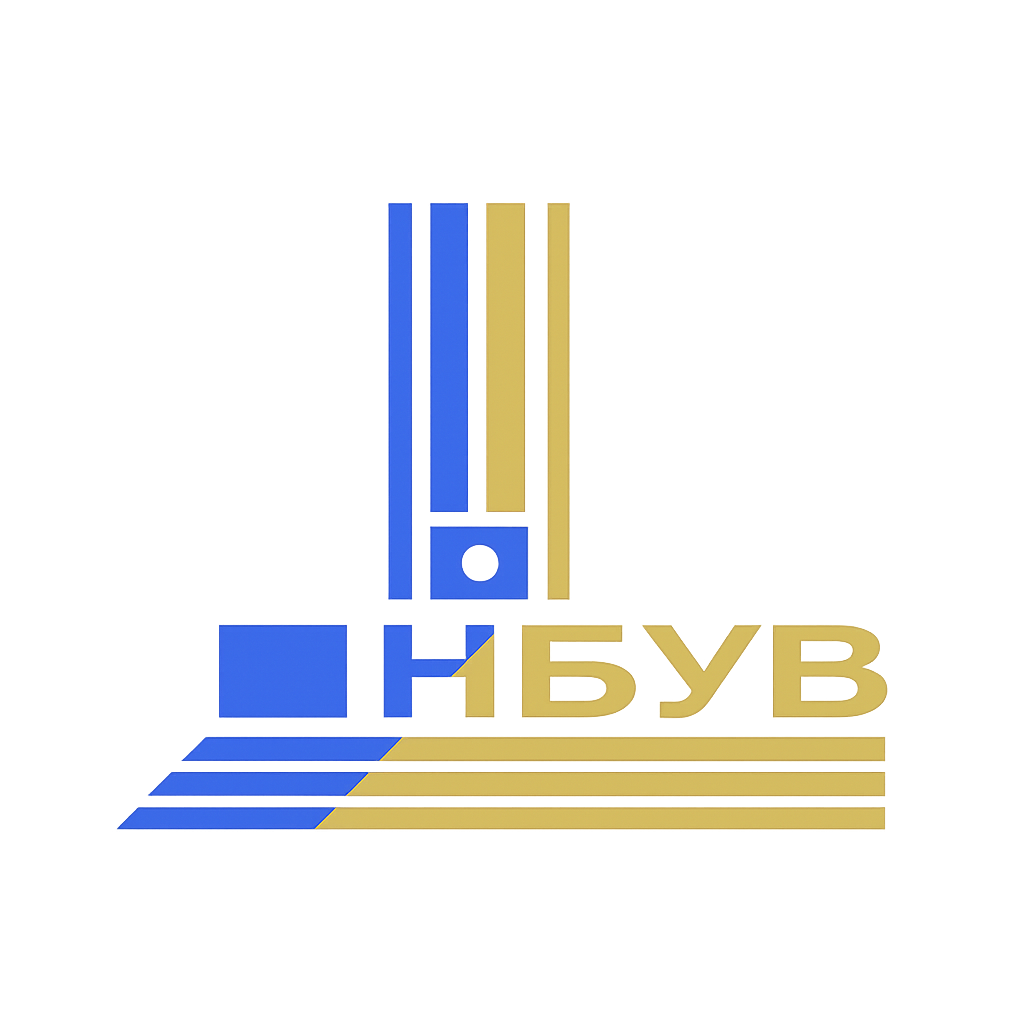

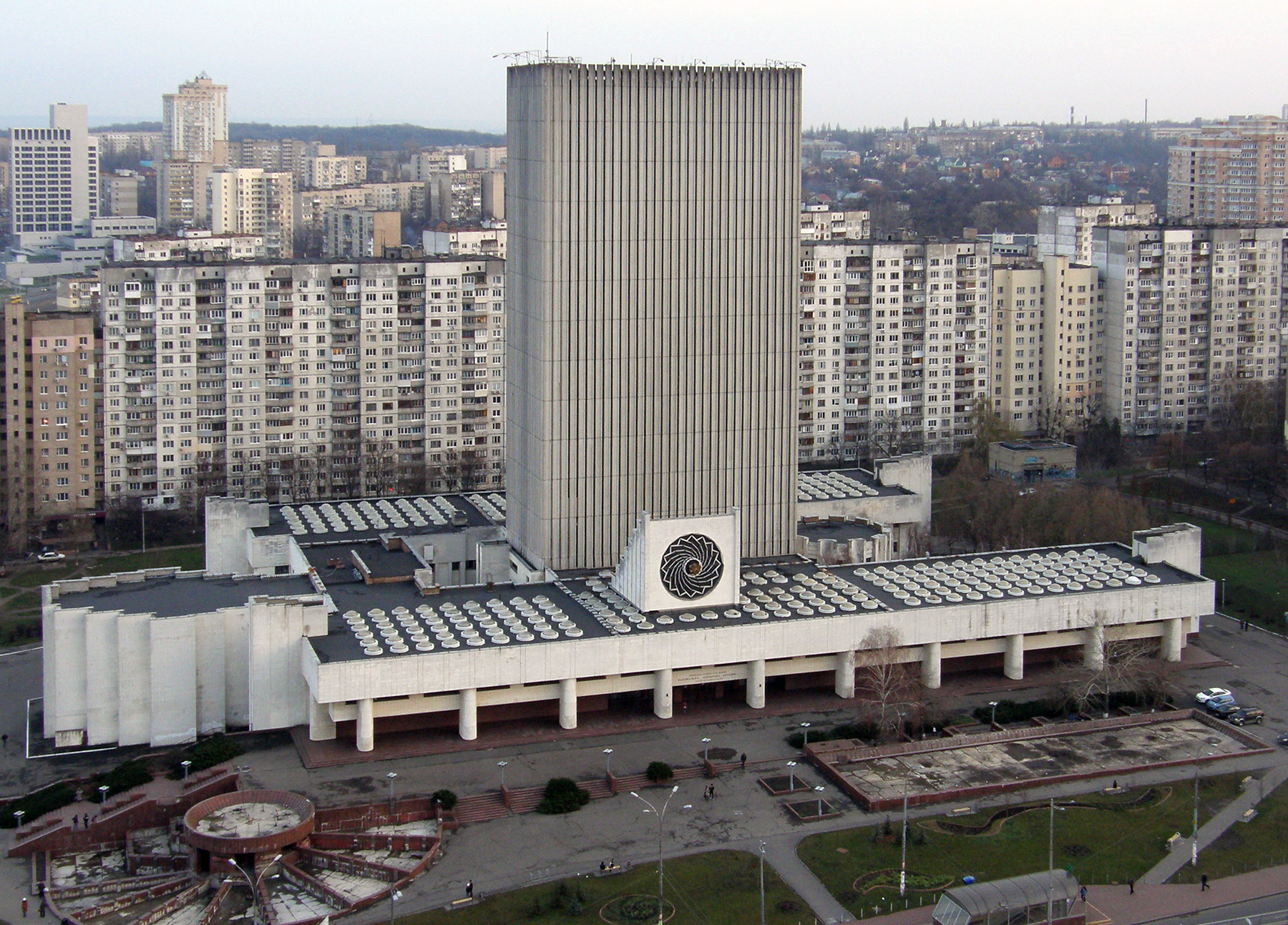
- 50°24′14″N 30°31′07″E
- Location: Holosiivskyi prospekt, 3, Kyiv, Ukraine
- Established: 2 August 1918; 108 years ago

Collection
- Size: 16,000,000 total Items

Other information
- Director: Lyubov Dubrovina
- Employees: 900
- Website: http://nbuv.gov.ua

The Vernadsky National Library of Ukraine, VNLU (Ukrainian: Національна бібліотека України імені В.І. Вернадського, romanized: Natsionalna biblioteka Ukrainy imeni V.I. Vernadskoho), the main academic library and main scientific information centre in Ukraine, is one of the largest national libraries in the world. It was founded in 1918. Its main building is located in the capital of the country—Kyiv, in the Demiivka neighborhood. During the German invasion of the Soviet Union, the library was evacuated to Ufa. Since its foundation, the library's official name has changed multiple times.

The library contains about 15 million items held on 27 floors. It has the world's most complete collection of Slavic writings, and the largest collection of archives of Ukrainian scientists and cultural persons. The holdings include the collection of the presidents of Ukraine, archive copies of Ukrainian printed documents from 1917, and the archives of the National Academy of Sciences of Ukraine.

== History ==
The Vernadsky National Library of Ukraine is the largest library in Ukraine. It is the country's main academic library and most important scientific information centre. It is among the world's largest national libraries. Its main building is located in the Demiivka neighborhood of Kyiv. It was founded on 2 August 1918 by Hetman Pavlo Skoropadskyi. Three weeks later the library's Provisional Committee was established, headed by the mineralogist Vladimir Vernadsky.

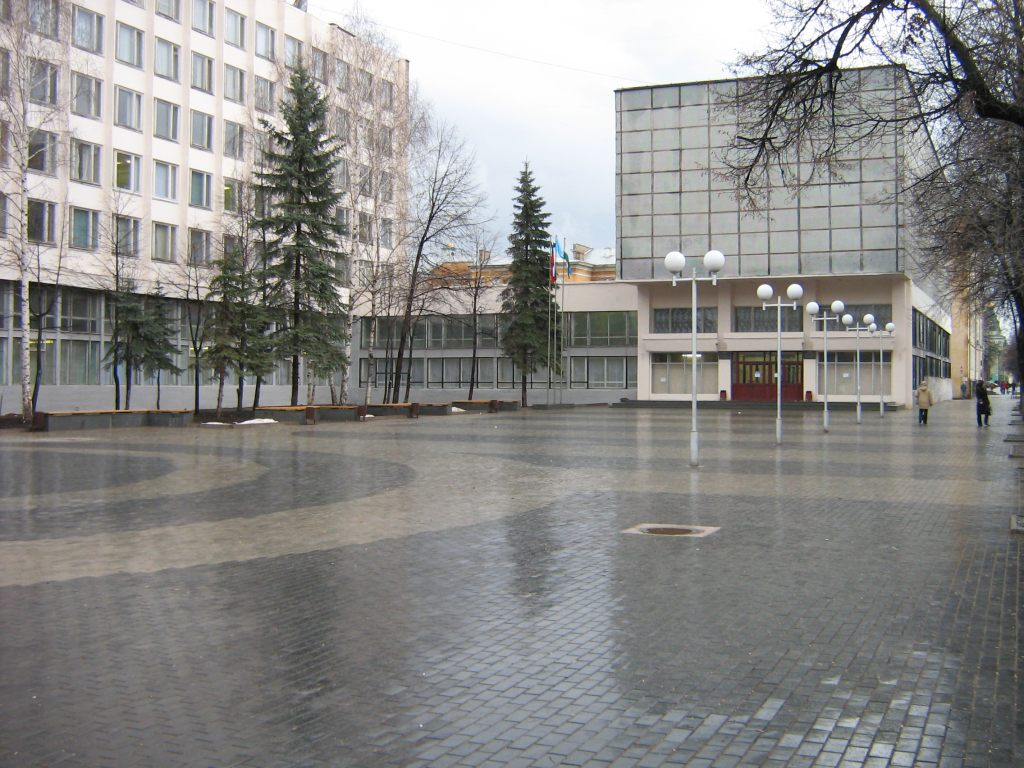
Bashkir State Pedagogical University

In August 1941 the library was evacuated to Ufa, the capital of Bashkortostan, where it was housed in the State Pedagogical Institute. In May 1944 the library was relocated back to Kyiv.

The current building was constructed between 1975 and 1989. It has 27 floors and an area of 35,700 square metres (384,000 sq ft). Its roof reaches 76.81 metres (252.0 ft). (Note: If its antenna is included, the height of the building is 78.638 metres (258.00 ft).)

The name given to the library has changed multiple times during the 20th century:

- National Library of the Ukrainian State (1918);
- National Library of Ukraine in Kyiv at the Ukrainian Academy of Sciences (1919);
- National Library of Ukraine at the All-Ukrainian Academy of Sciences in Kyiv (1919–1920);
- National Library of Ukraine in Kyiv (1920–1934);
- State Library of the All-Ukrainian Academy of Sciences (1934–1936);
- Library of the Academy of Sciences of the USSR (1936–1948);
- State Public Library of the Ukrainian SSR (1948–1965);
- Central Scientific Library of the USSR Academy of Sciences (1965–1988);
- Central Scientific Library named after VI Vernadsky Academy of Sciences of the USSR (1988–1996);
- VI Vernadsky National Library of Ukraine (since 1996).

== Holdings ==
The collection of the Vernadsky National Library of Ukraine contains more than 15 million items. Its basis form the large book collections of the 18th to 19th centuries.

As a depository library the library has systematic acquisition. Annually, it receives 160,000 to 180,000 documents (books, magazines, newspapers, etc.). Holdings include all Ukrainian publications and copies of all Ukrainian candidate and doctoral theses. The library exchanges materials with more than 1,500 research and academic institutions and libraries from 80 countries. As a United Nations depository library since 1964, the library receives all English and Russian language publications from the United Nations and its special institutions.

The holdings of the Vernadsky National Library include large collections of manuscripts, rare printed books and incunabula. The library has the most complete collection of Slavic writing, including the Peresopnytsia Gospels, one of the most intricate surviving East Slavic manuscripts.

The Vernadsky National Library of Ukraine is the world's foremost repository of Jewish folk music recorded on Edison wax cylinders. Many of these were field recordings made during the Soviet or pre-Soviet era by ethnologists such as Susman Kiselgof, Moisei Beregovsky, and Sofia Magid. Their Collection of Jewish Musical Folklore (1912–1947) was inscribed on UNESCO's Memory of the World Register in 2005.

=== Collections ===
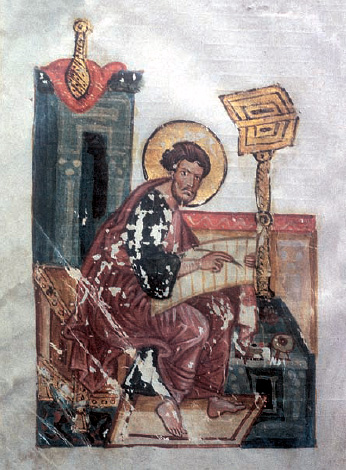
The Orsha Gospel

The library owns works related to the history and culture of Ukraine and its surrounding regions. Its collection includes some of the oldest and rarest documents in the country, including the only extant manuscript composition by the 18th century Ukrainian composer Artemy Vedel.

==== Orsha Gospel ====
The library holds the Orsha Gospel. The book, which dates back to the late 13th century, is one of the oldest Belaurisian texts and one of the oldest books that depicts the Cyrillic script. Thrown away by a monastery in Orsha, it was discovered by Napoleon's troops in 1812. In 1874 it was donated to the Kyiv Theological Academy. It has miniature brightly coloured illuminations of Saint Luke and Saint Matthew, depicted in the Palaeologian dynasty style. Over 300 illustrations of flowers and animals are found in the book, which consists of the Gospel, a menology, and matutinal gospels.

==== Eneida ====
Eneida—Ivan Kotliarevsky's epic poem version of the Aeneid by Virgil—is the first piece of literature written in common Ukrainian. It was also the first book to discuss the culture and history of Ukraine. The library holds five first edition copies.

== See also ==
- List of libraries in Ukraine
