= Lysychansk =

City in Luhansk Oblast, Ukraine

Lysychansk: Лисичанськ (Ukrainian); Лисичанск (Russian)
- City
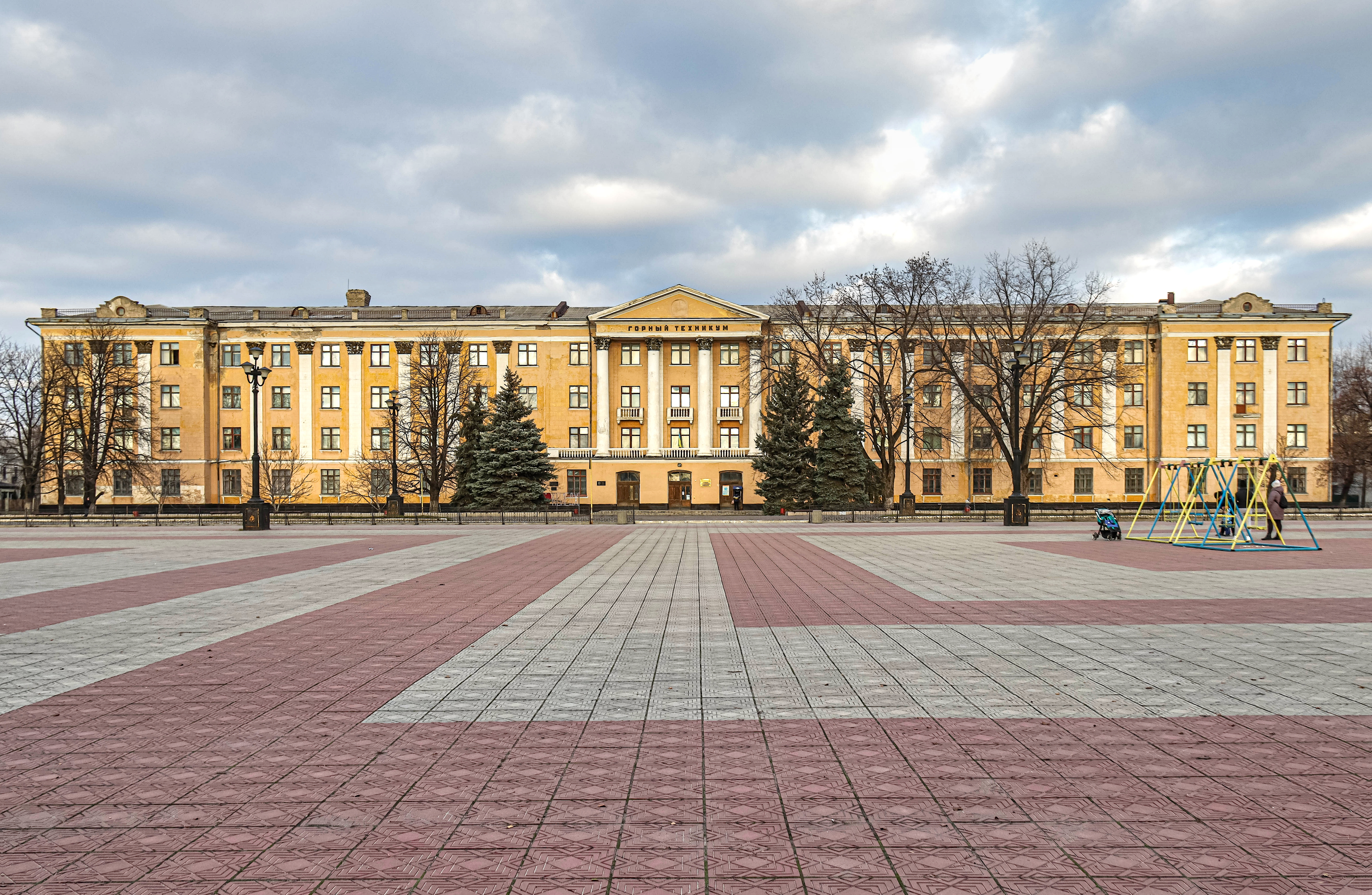
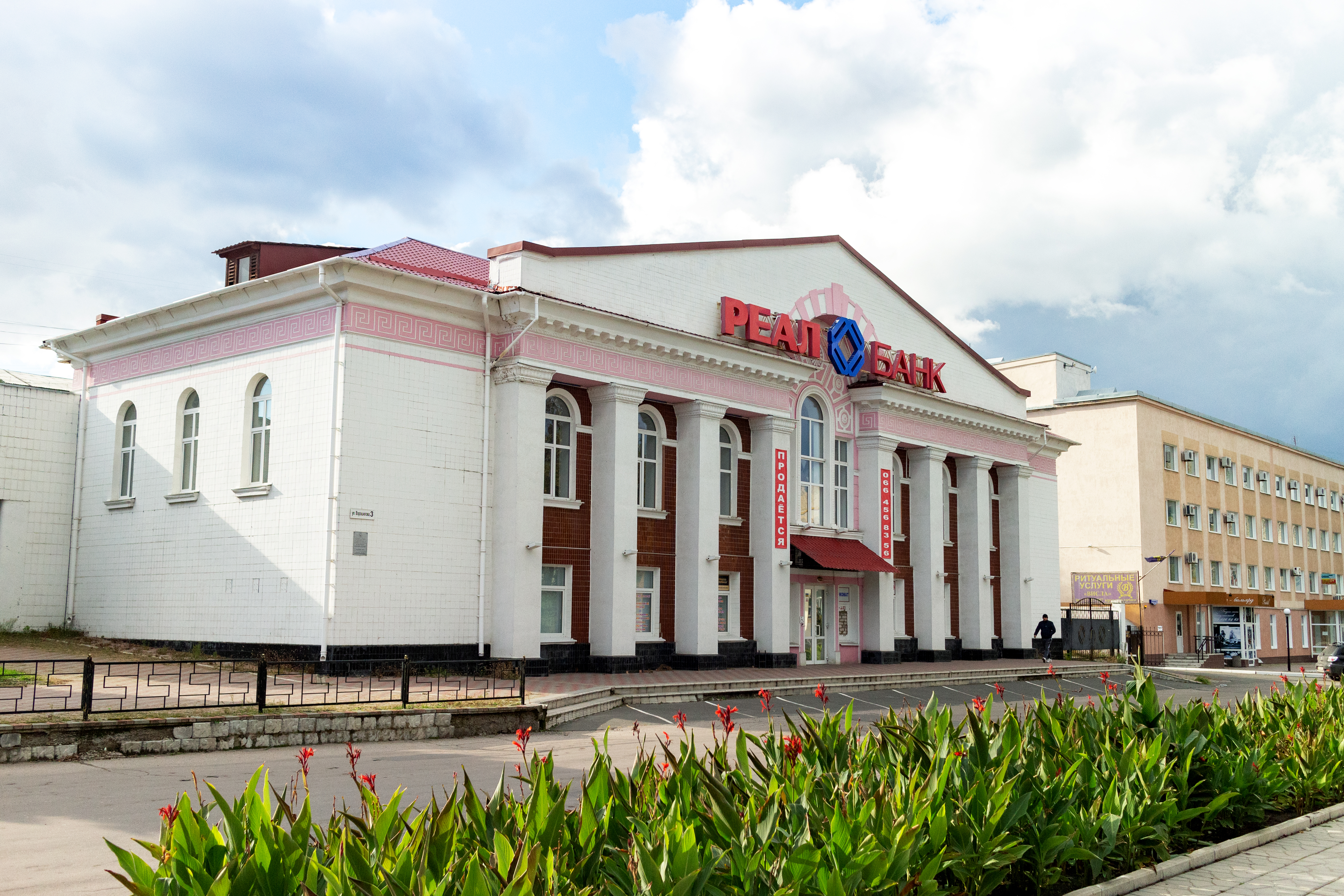
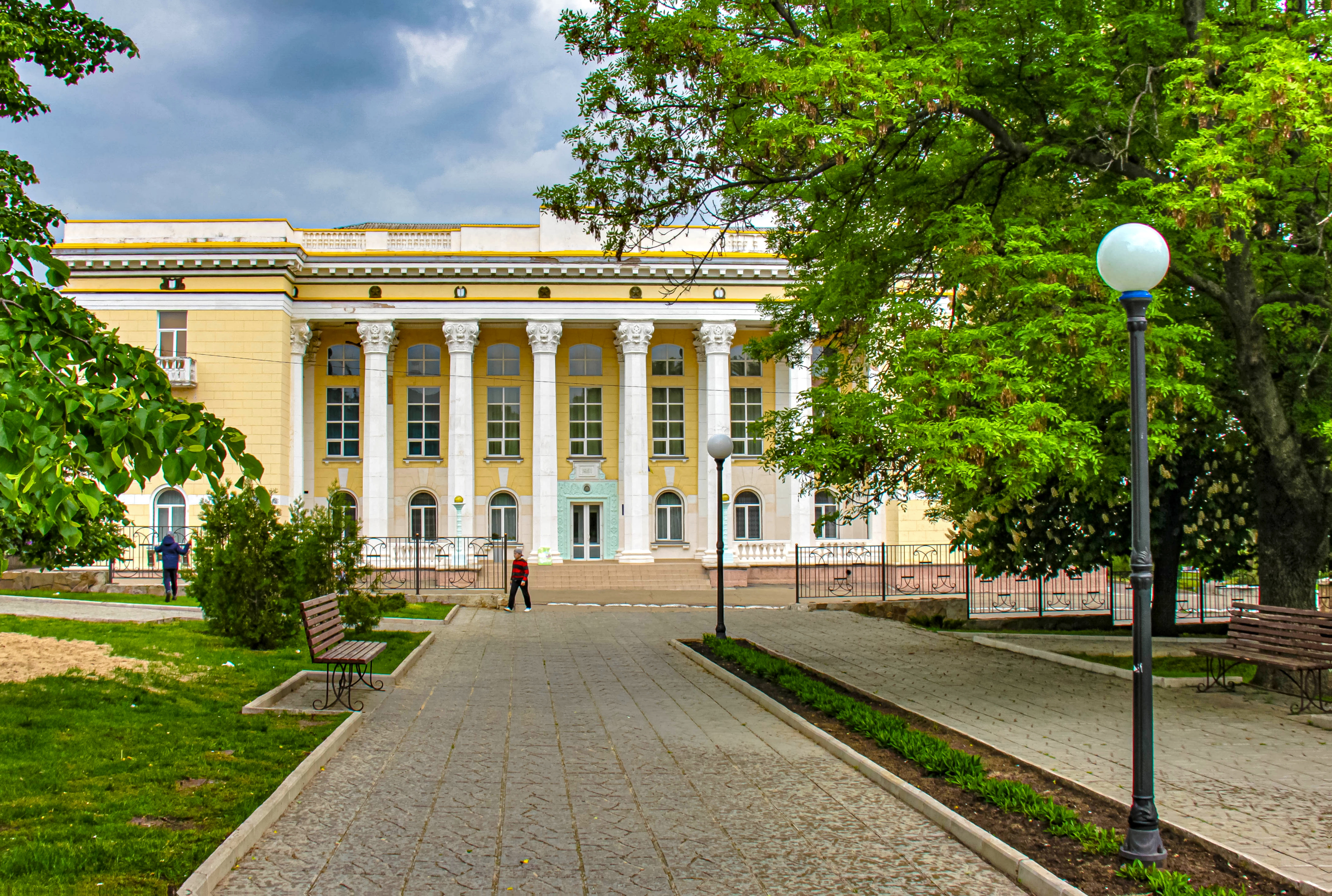
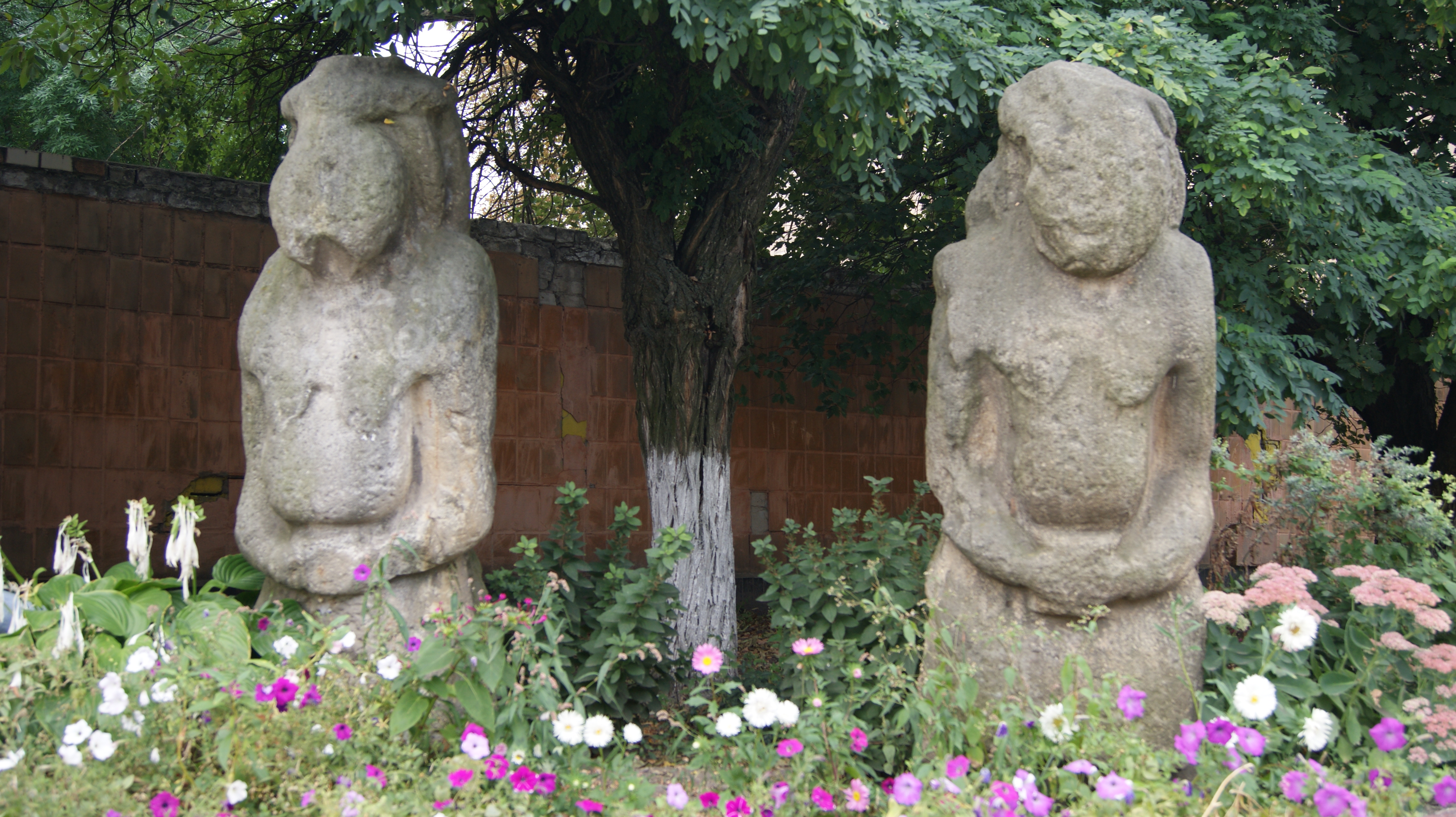
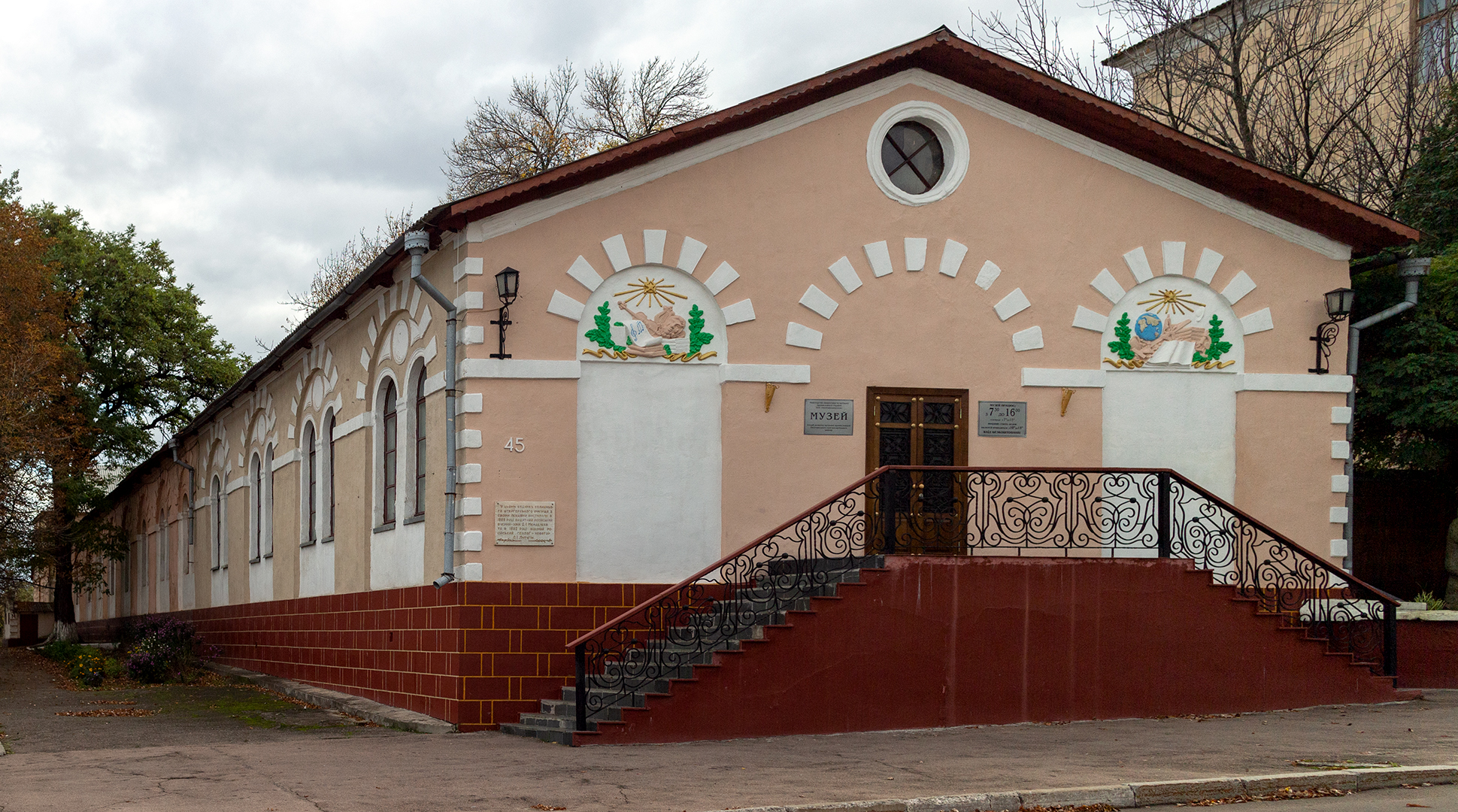
- State Mining and Industrial College "Oktyabrskiy" Ex-Cinema ITP club Kurgan stelae Museum of Coal Industry Development

- Flag Coat of arms
- Nickname: Cradle of the Donbas (Note: Sources:)
- Interactive map of Lysychansk
- Location within Luhansk Oblast Location within Ukraine
- Coordinates: 48°55′N 38°24′E
- Country: Ukraine
- Oblast: Luhansk Oblast
- Raion: Sievierodonetsk Raion
- Hromada: Lysychansk urban hromada
- Founded: 1710 (Note: During the Soviet-era, 1705 was also sometimes given as the founding date, like in the popular dictionary "The Name of Your City" by Yuriy Kruglyak. However, nowadays, most Ukrainian sources agree that 1710 is the founding date due to newer evidence, which is why 1710 is on the entrance sign. The city also marked their 310th anniversary in 2010, which coincides with the 1710 date.)
- City rights: 1938

Government
  - Mayor: Vacant

Area
  - Total: 96 km^{2} (37 sq mi)
- Elevation: 145 m (476 ft)

Population (2022)
  - Total: 93,340
  - Density: 1,201.43/km^{2} (3,111.7/sq mi)
- Time zone: UTC+2 (EET)
  - Summer (DST): UTC+3 (EEST)
- Postal code: 93100—93199
- Area code: +380 6451
- Licence plate: BB
- Climate: Dfb
- Website: Lis.gov.ua

Lysychansk (Note: See § Name for alternative spellings and pronunciations.) is a city in Sievierodonetsk Raion, Luhansk Oblast, eastern Ukraine. It is located on the high right bank of the Donets River, approximately 115 kilometres (71 mi) from the administrative center of the oblast, Luhansk. It faces Sievierodonetsk across the river, which is considered its twin city, and is also situated close by to Rubizhne and Kreminna. Its population before the Russian invasion of Ukraine was approximately 93,340 (2022 estimate)., making it the 40th-largest city in Ukraine and the fourth-largest city in Luhansk Oblast.

Lysychansk is popularly believed to have been settled permanently starting in 1710, with the founding of the Cossack settlement of Lisya Balka. In 1721, the settlement gained notoriety when the first ever coal in the entirety of the Donbas was discovered there, and in 1795, under orders by Empress Catherine II, the first ever mine in the Donbas was also set up in the area. The intended purpose of the mine was to supply the foundry in the also newly established city of Luhansk. Over the next few decades, the settlement would rapidly grow as a regional mining centre, eventually transitioning into the name Lysychansk in the 1850s–60s. After the October Revolution, it was claimed by the Soviet Union after a change of hands in late 1919. The settlement of Lysychansk was reclassified as a city in 1938, but was again devastated by World War II. After reconstruction, the city became known for its glass and coal mining industry, and eventually oil with the opening of the Lysychansk Oil Refinery. After the collapse of the Soviet Union, the city became part of a newly independent Ukraine. In 2014, during the War in the Donbas, the city was seized by pro-Russian separatists, who incorporated it into the self-proclaimed Luhansk People's Republic. Ukrainian troops regained the city in July 2014 after the separatists' defeat at the Siege of Sloviansk. After a few years of recovery, in 2022 during the Russian invasion of Ukraine, the city became the site again of the Battle of Lysychansk, which ended with the capture of the city by Russian forces and the Luhansk People's Republic on 2 July. Up to 12,000 were estimated to have remained in the city, according to Ukrainian authorities. Russia has claimed the city following its declared annexation of the region in September 2022.

Lysychansk has historically been a large industrial centre in Luhansk Oblast, known initially for its coal mining and then also its glass industry and oil. However, the city has been undergoing a major industrial collapse, especially after 2010, when most of the large industrial enterprises were closed. Cultural landmarks include the Steiger School, the two Polovtsian stone women, the monument to soldier-pilots with a L-29 aircraft, and the protected area of Congressiv Yar. The main museums of the city are the City Museum of Local Lore and the Museum of the History of Mining. The city was formerly home to many association football clubs that played at Shaktar Stadium; however, most of them have since been shut down. The city is also home to seven institutions of higher education, most notably the Mining-Industrial Professional College and the Lysychansk Medical Professional College. After the War in the Donbas, some universities also relocated to the city from occupied territory, including ones from Kadiivka and Brianka.

== Name ==
=== Current names ===
- Ukrainian: Лисичанськ, romanized: Lysychansk (/ˌlɪsɪˈtʃænsk/ LISS-ih-CHANSK, /-ˈtʃɑːnsk/ -CHAHNSK; IPA: [lɪsɪˈtʃɑnʲsʲk])
- Russian: Лисичанск, romanized: Lisichansk (IPA: [lʲɪsʲɪˈtɕansk])

=== Former names ===
- Lisya Balka (Russian: Лися Балка, romanized: Lysya Balka; Ukrainian: Ліся Балка, romanized: Lisya Balka) or sometimes Oleniachi Hory (Russian: Горы Оленячи; Ukrainian: Гори Оленячі 1710–1795
- Workers' Quarters (Russian: Строение мастеровых; Ukrainian: Будівля майстрових) or sometimes still Lisya Balka 1795–1864

=== Name history ===
The city is generally thought to have been founded in 1710. This came after a 1703 decree by Peter I ordered that the Cossacks be resettled from Right-Bank Ukraine, which was put into fruition by Hetman Ivan Skoropadsky on 5 July 1710 when he relocated three companies of Zaporozhian Cossacks to the area. This settlement took on the name of Lisya Balka, which came from the ravine they settled in. The ravine, even prior to any settlement, was known as Lisya Balka, meaning "Fox Ravine" because there were once a lot of foxes that resided in the area. Sometimes, the settlement is also referred to as a section name of Oleniachi Hory, meaning "Deer Mountains", because, much like Lisya Balka, deer also used to be common there, but it quickly fell out of use since the deer were all hunted into extinction by the end of the 18th century. A 1710 charter and a 1712 survey both refer to the name of the area as Lisya Balka or Oleniachi Hory.

For the next few decades, Lisya Balka would remain as the name of the village. In 1795, the first mine in the Donbas was opened up in Verkhnie, which was next to Lisya Balka and was for some time a separate village before being incorporated into Lysychansk. At the same time, a separate settlement popped up around the mine, which went by various names in its early years. An 1803 court document does not give it a name, just referring to it as "at Fox Ravine", and an 1821 map labeled the new settlement as just "workers' quarters". Informally, the new settlement went by the name Lysychansk, which was first referred to in an 1829 article in the "Mining Journal", referring to a deposit of coal known as the "Lysychansk deposit". An 1838 document also lists the name of the settlement as the "Lysychansk coal working", and gradually the name started to catch on. An 1864 charter is generally considered when the name finally transitioned into Lysychansk. Lysychansk itself is also derived from the original ravine's name, much like Lisya Balka.

== History ==
=== Ancient history ===
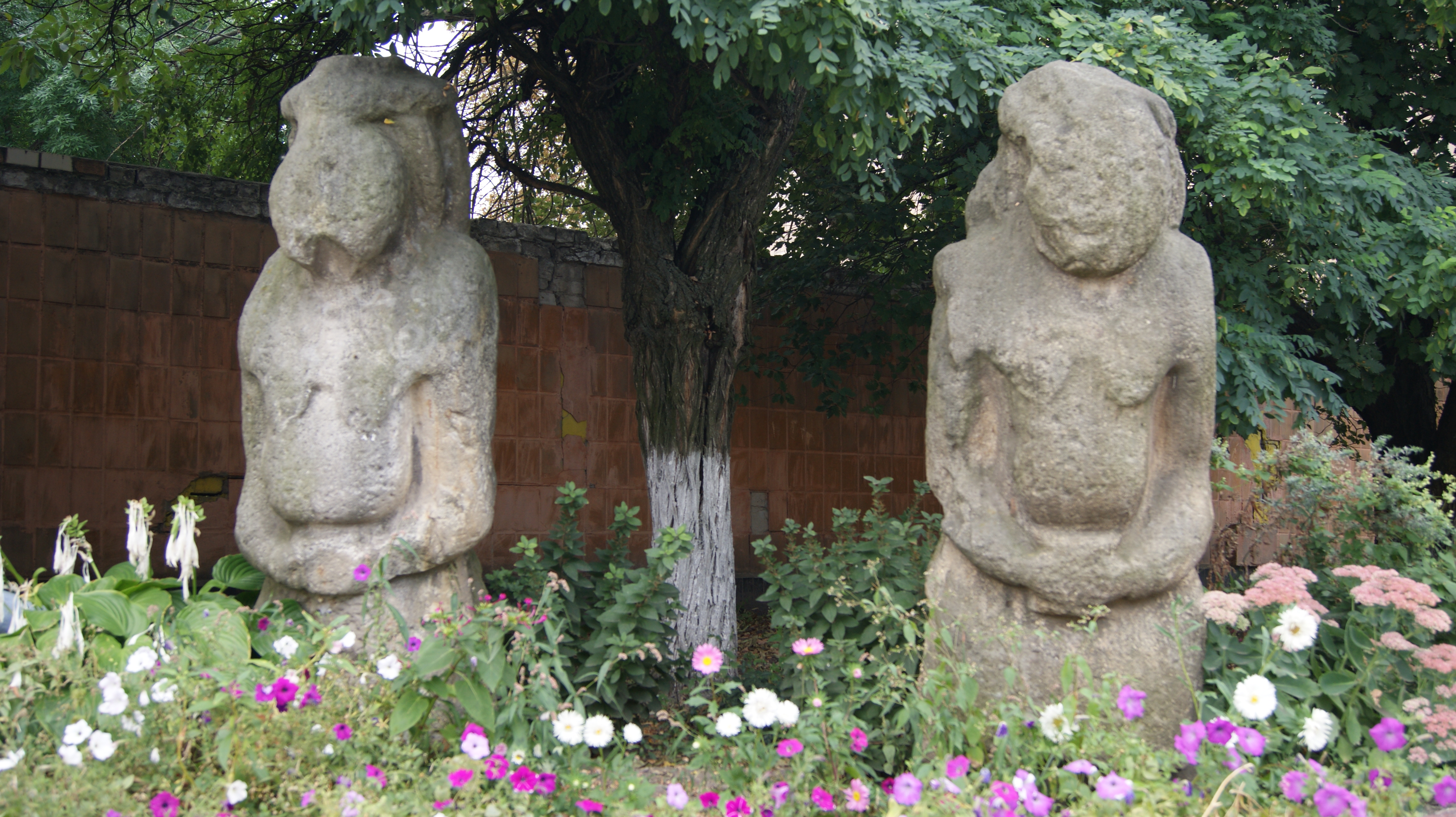
Polovtsian statues in the city.

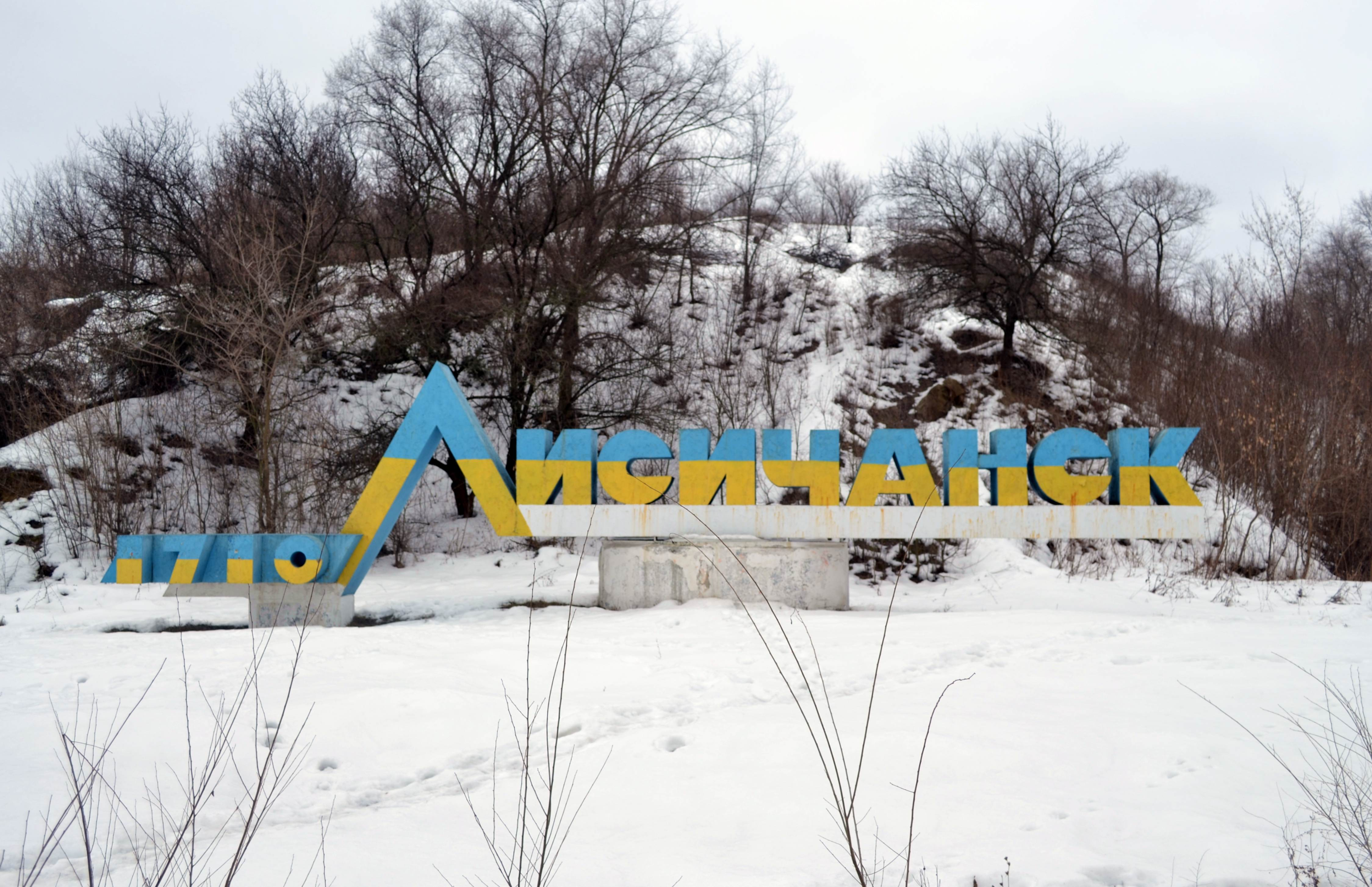
Entrance sign to the city of Lysychansk. The "1710" inscription refers to the establishment of Lisya Balka, which is considered the founding date of Lysychansk.

The first attested inhabitation around the area that would become Lysychansk was during the Lower Paleolithic era on the banks of the Donets River. It was later inhabited during the ancient period by people of the Catacomb culture, as evidenced by large Kurgan stelae found in the city. This was followed by many steppe people, such as the Scythians who left barbed arrowheads in the city, and the Polovtsian people who left behind stone statues and objects that are now located in a former building of a school. After an initial decline, the area was taken over by the khanate of the Golden Horde and then briefly the Grand Duchy of Lithuania who built a fortification to the east of the city. For many centuries afterwards, the area became a contested, uninhabited land. The three main parties in the area that contested the land were the Polish-Lithuanian union, the Grand Principality of Moscow, and the Crimean Khanate. The Tatars, in particular, used a route that went through the city as a raiding route, but also as an area of diplomacy with other nations.

This was then followed up by two notable sites within the city: a fortification and Borivske. The fortification was built in 1672 by the Cossacks to monitor the Crimean Tatars, while Borivske was the first stable settlement in the city, also established by the Cossacks. Prior to this, no permanent settlement had existed in the city, mostly because a raiding route ran through it, making settlement dangerous. After Borivske, two more settlements were founded shortly thereafter, called Krasnianskyi, founded in 1678, and Lisya Balka, founded in 1710. The 1710 settlement is popularly considered the founding date of Lysychansk, as the entrance sign to the city uses 1710. Both were also Cossack settlements, with Lisya Balka being founded in response to Peter the Great forcibly relocating the Cossacks from Right-Bank Ukraine in retaliation for the Bulavin Rebellion. However, all three settlements established up to this point were not on the right bank, as modern-day Lysychansk now is, because even though their territory hypothetically extended into the right bank, settlement was made impossible on the right bank by the Crimean Tatars or Nogai people who would destroy these settlements as they claimed the land.

=== Imperial Russian settlement ===
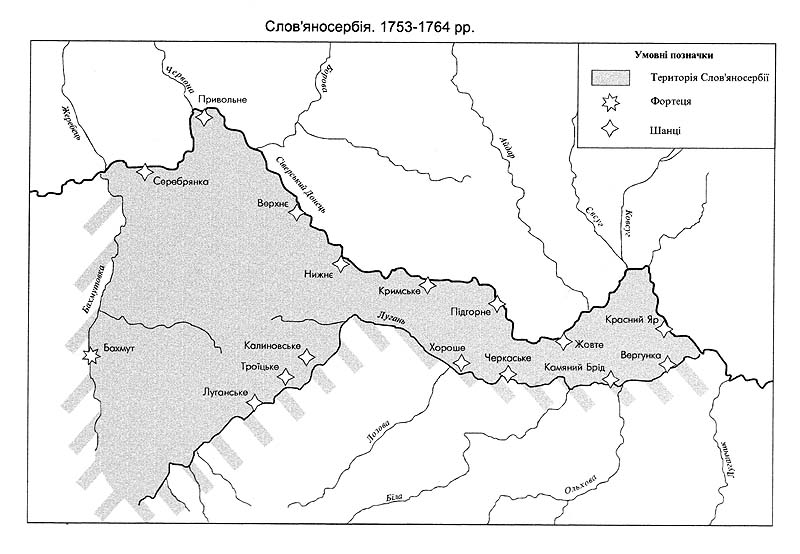
Map of Slavo-Serbia. Modern-day Lysychansk did not exist yet, as the area of the city was within the Third Company (Verkhnie), which is seen on the map as "Верхнє".

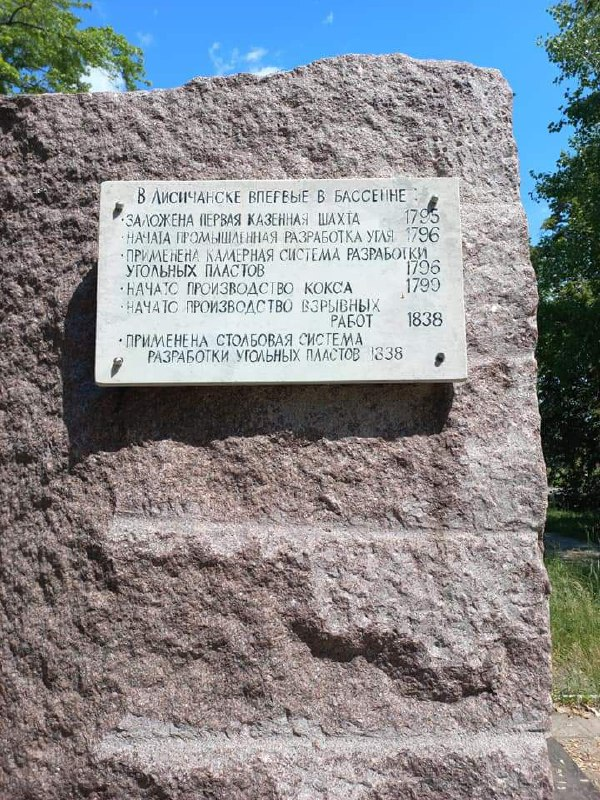
Marker in Lysychansk noting the first mine and coal extraction in the city (1795 and 1796, respectively.)

In 1721, the settlements gained notoriety following a survey that discovered the first ever coal in the entirety of the Donbas near Lisya Balka. The Donbas would later become a major regional coal producer. However, for many years, nothing came out of it following the death of Peter the Great. In 1753, the Cossacks were pushed out when a new settlement was established by decree of the Imperial Russian government on the right bank. Upon the decree, the new area would be known as Slavo-Serbia, and mainly be inhabited by hussar regiments consisting of Balkan people. The settlement would become known as the Third Company or Verkhnie, and would thereafter rapidly grow. In November 1795, the topic of coal was finally returned to under Catherine II, who established the first mine ever in the Donbas in the village of Verkhnie. The mine was meant to supply the foundry in the new city of Luhansk, which would then go to the Black Sea Fleet. It was the only mine in the Donbas until 1801.

For the first decade of coal mining in the Donbas following the 1795 decree, the new mine known as "Petropavlivska" in Verkhnie would supply nearly 91.5% of all coal production from the Donbas. Around the mine, a settlement would grow known variously but most commonly as the Workers' Quarters, which is generally considered the village that Lysychansk now is, as Verkhnie would spin off into its own village before being incorporated into Lysychansk. Due to this, the settlement became greatly important, although by the 1850s the name for the Workers' Quarters fell out of use and Lysychansk transitioned to being the formal name. The name was cemented in an 1864 charter for the "village of Lysychansk. This development though, would not last long, as by the late 1800s, Lysychansk would undergo a major decline, in part due to the Emancipation reform of 1861 which stopped the previously used obligatory worker status. In 1890, the Belgian industrialist Ernest Solvay built a soda plant with surrounding infrastructure for the Belgian staff. He also built the "Konstantin Skalovsky" mine, which at the time was the largest and most technically advanced in all of the Donbas. It included the Donbas's first aerial cableway meant for coal transport. This was considered a turning point, as with the foreign investment, Lysychansk began to rapidly recover. With the advent of World War One, the need for coal also increased significantly. In 2017 these buildings (a gymnasium, a hospital and a range of residential buildings) won the 'Belgian Heritage Abroad Award'.

=== Soviet era ===
==== Early 20th century ====
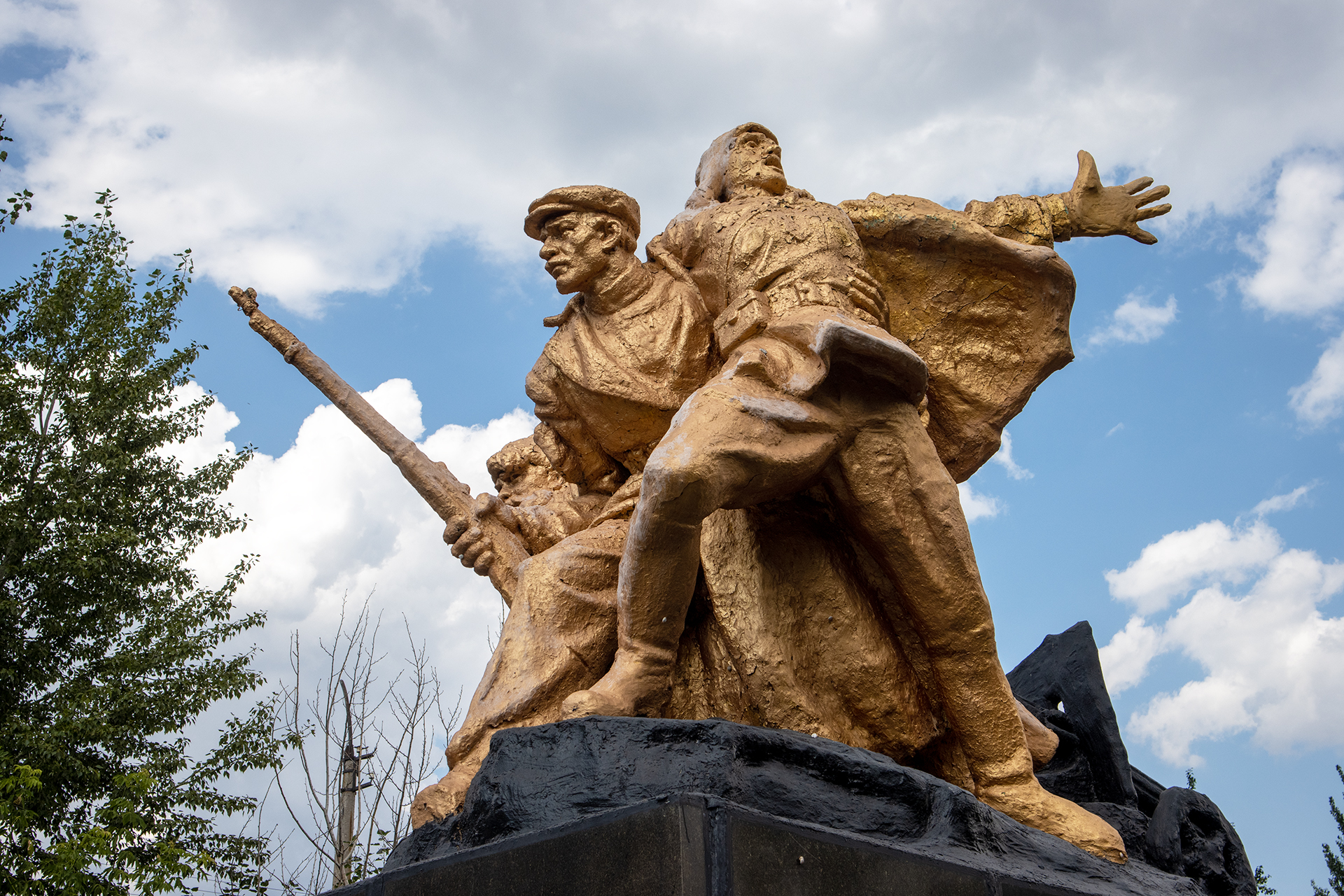
Monument to the people who established Soviet power in the city.

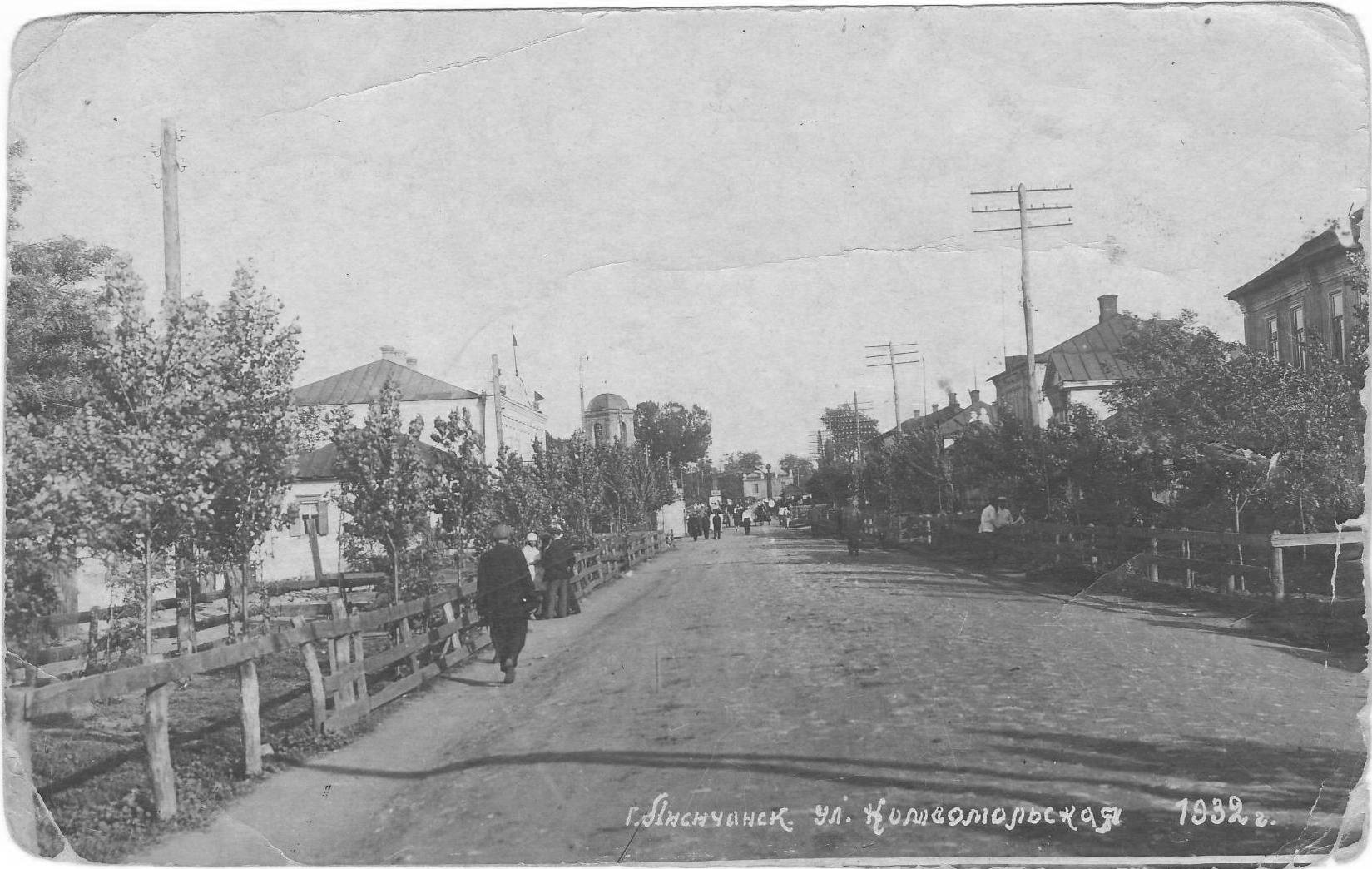
Komsomolskaya Street in the "Old Town" of Lysychansk, 1932

In 1917, following the October Revolution, where the Bolsheviks took over power from the Provisional Russian Government after the February Revolution, Lysychansk was heavily impacted. In response to the Bolshevik takeover, the Ukrainian People's Republic declared its independence, starting the Ukrainian-Soviet War as part of the Russian Civil War. After this declaration, the settlement was seized by the Soviets, who incorporated it into the Donetsk–Krivoy Rog Soviet Republic, encountering little resistance from the UPR. A local newspaper has been published in the city since January 1918. Bolshevik control, however, would not last long, as by April 1918 the Imperial German Army, as part of the Central Powers intervention in the war, retook the settlement. Under the Germans, the settlement became de jure parts of the UPR, until the Ukrainian State was also established in late April, which vied for power with the UPR, which eventually, in November 1918, led to the Anti-Hetman Uprising. The UPR then established firm control in the region. The Ukrainians were unable to defend the settlement in January 1919 following the Soviet invasion, and the Bolsheviks recaptured Lysychansk shortly thereafter. A few months later, in July 1919, the White movement then took over from the Soviets until December 1919, when the Bolsheviks would regain the settlement for the last time.

The Ukrainian War of Independence, in the end, decimated the settlement and its industries. In particular, it was prone during this time to banditry and severe famines. In 1920, the Bolsheviks nationalized the mines and plants in Lysychansk. Afterwards, it was administratively part of the Donets Governorate of Ukraine. In 1922, the settlement became part of the Soviet Union following its establishment. During this time, the economy gradually recovered, in particular the glass industry in Lysychansk, which grew with the establishment of a new mechanised glass plant. Since Lysychansk was an industrial centre, it was not as heavily impacted by the Holodomor. Instead, it became a prime destination for peasants from the countryside who were experiencing mass starvation, which would lead to a rapid increase in the population. Thus, Lysychansk by decree was reclassified as a city in October 1938.

==== World War II ====
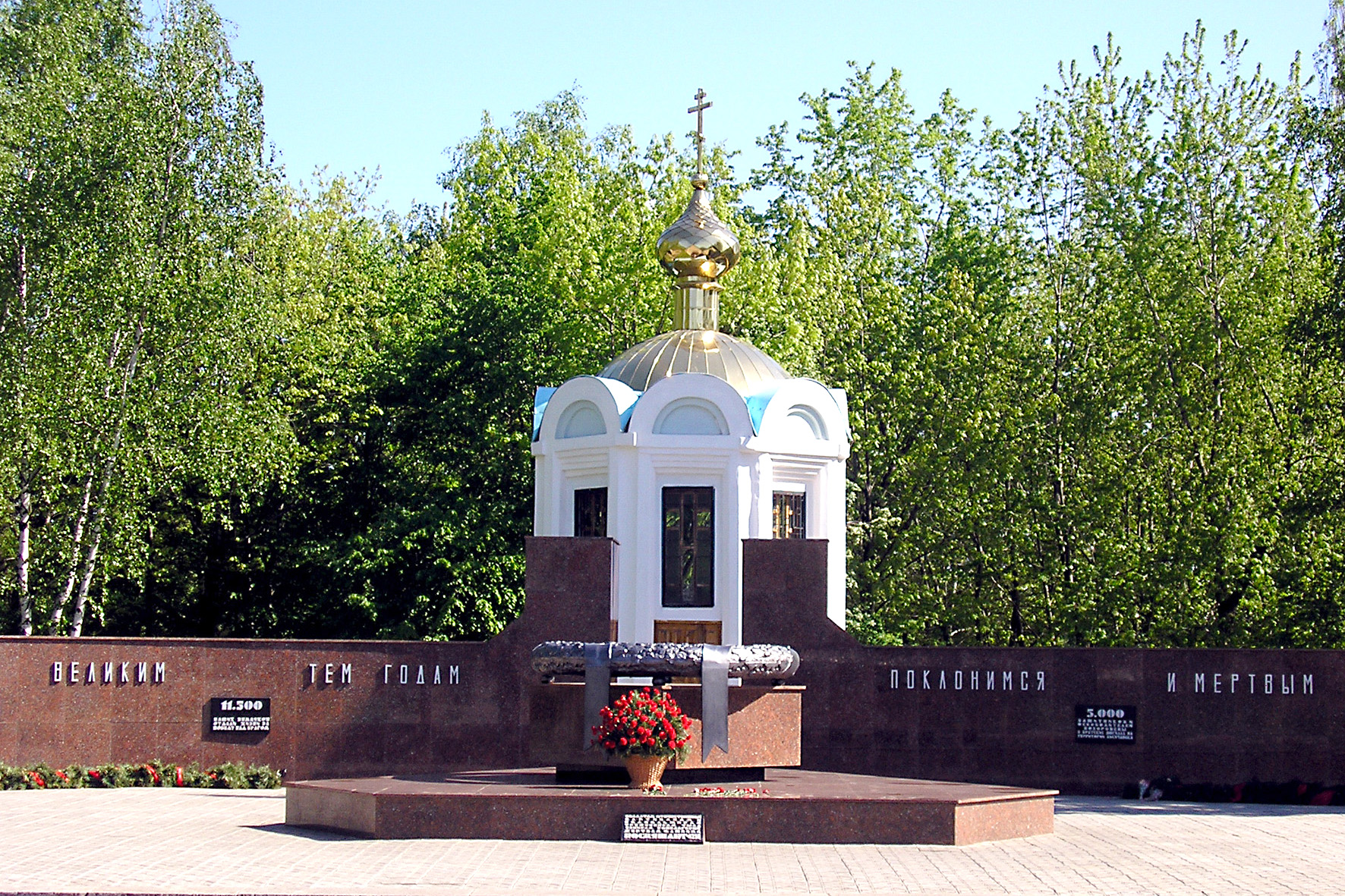
World War II memorial in the city.

This growth was dramatically halted by World War II and the start of Operation Barbarossa. After its start, most of the city's industries would be evacuated to Chelyabinsk in the Urals on the orders of the USSR. The city was then manned by a reserve division of the 37th Army as part of the Southwestern Front, which was backed up by partisans from Dobropillia and Bakhmut that were brought over. The Soviets would hold the city for another eight months, in part due to the nearby forestry, until Operation Case Blue under the Germans, who broke through the Soviet line (which by this time was mostly held by the 275th Rifle Division) with the use of the 76th Infantry Division. The city fell to the Germans on 10 July 1942 after they crossed the Donets, pushing back the Soviets to Rubizhne. The city would then remain occupied until 6 February 1943, when it was briefly liberated when the Soviets crossed the Donets again. However, the Germans returned with new divisions, and reoccupied the city on 3 March 1943. The second occupation, in particular, was far deadlier than the first. More than 2,300 people were deported from Lysychansk under German orders, and the Germans massacred hundreds of civilians, including in a notable ravine of 27 people off Donetska Street. In addition, as part of the Holocaust, the Germans murdered 37 Jewish families. After this devastation, the city was retaken a second time on 2 September 1943 by the 279th Rifle Division.

==== Post-war ====
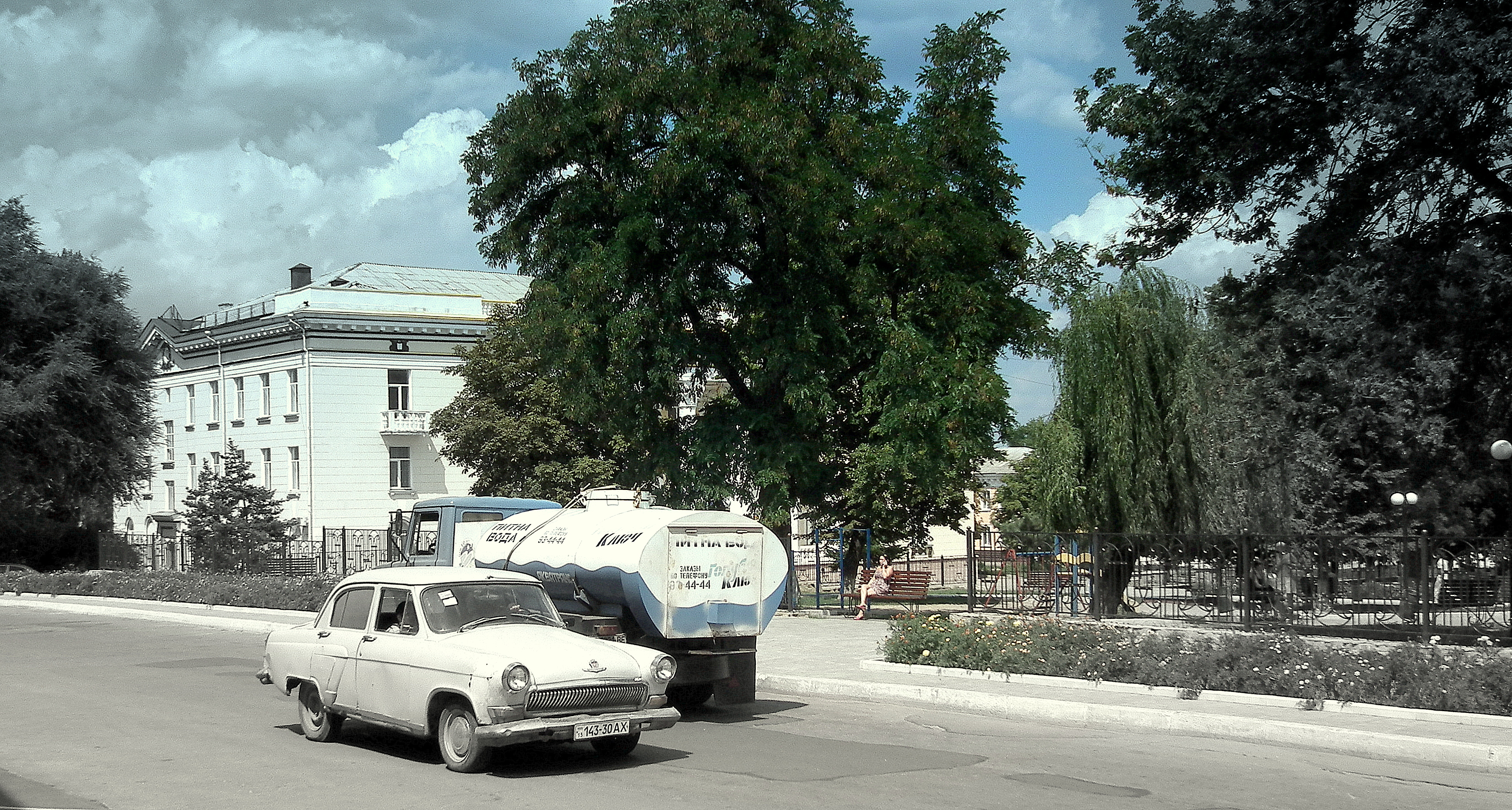
Center of Lysychansk in the 1960s.

The war, much like the previous civil war, destroyed the city. Only around 300 residents were left in the city, and nearly all the enterprises left were destroyed. However, by order in 1944, most of the enterprises that had been evacuated to Chelyabinsk were brought back, although the mines remained flooded. It took until 1947 for the city to return to its pre-war levels following massive restoration. Afterward, the city's industry continued to rapidly grow alongside its population. In the late 1950s, there was some discussion about combining Lysychansk, Sievierodonetsk, and Rubizhne into a singular city known as "Mendeleev", but nothing came to be. Throughout the 1960s, the city's borders were also heavily changed. The city of Sievierodonetsk, which began as a village serving a chemical plant on Lysychansk's outskirts, was broken off as a twin city. That same year, it was made the administrative centre of the new Lysychansk Raion. In 1963, the towns of Novodruzhesk and Pryvillia were included in the city limits of Lysychansk and became cities. In 1965, Lysychansk incorporated the settlements of Verkhnie and Proletarske. However, in 1977, the Soviets decided to relocate and rename the raion, and Lysychansk Raion was renamed to Popasna Raion and the administrative centre was moved to Popasna too.

With the growing industry, the population of the city crossed the 100,000 mark in 1970. A few years later, in 1979, the city was chosen as the site of the new Lysychansk Oil Refinery, which quickly became one of the largest refineries in the Ukrainian SSR, divesting from the glass and mine industries that had previously dominated the city's economy. Lysychansk's population reached a peak of 127,000 in 1989, right before the collapse of the Soviet Union.

=== Independent Ukraine ===
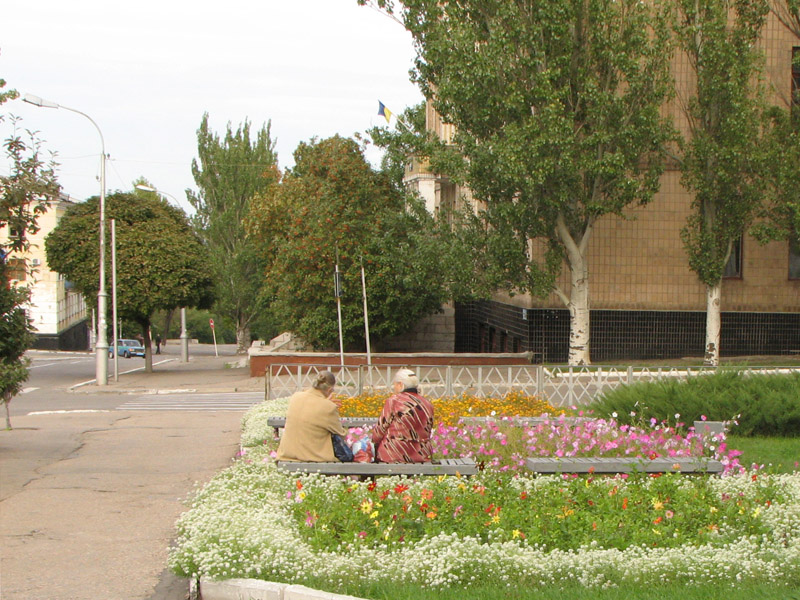
Lysychansk in 2006.

After the collapse of the Soviet Union, the city became part of the newly independent Ukraine in 1991. Afterwards, the city's industries became almost entirely privatised, and in the 2000s most of the industries in the city were bought out by Russian-linked companies, most notably the oil refinery and the soda plant. Subsequently, in the early 2010s, the city's historical enterprises almost all collapsed. Within two years, the rubber products factory, oil refinery, and soda plant were all shut down, none of them ever returning to production.

==== Russo-Ukrainian War ====
===== War in Donbas =====
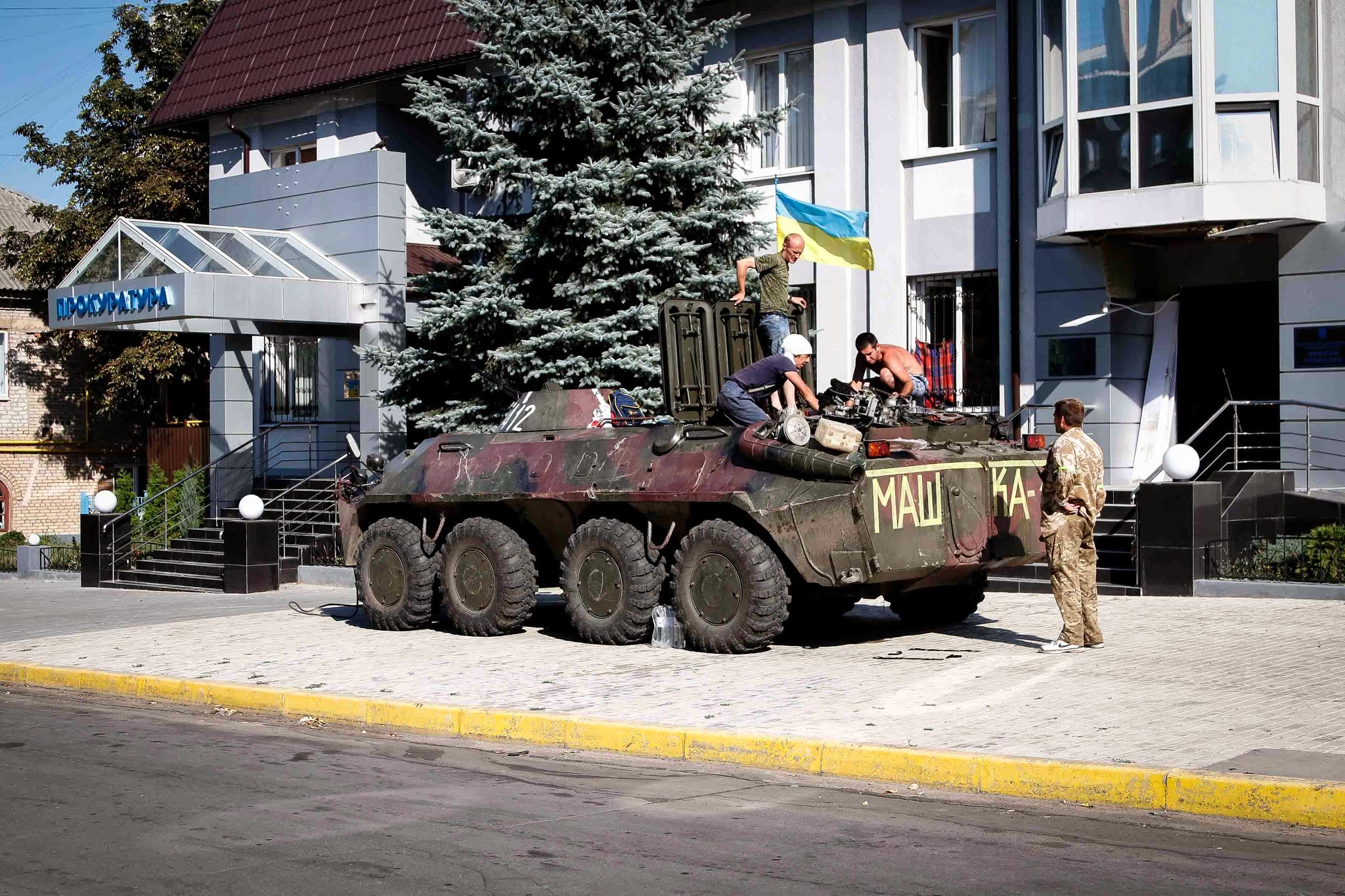
A tank entering Lysychansk in July 2014.

During the 2014 pro-Russian unrest in Ukraine the town was captured early April 2014 by pro-Russian separatists. It remained under control of separatists for three months, until 22 July 2014 Ukrainian Ukrinform reported that the separatists "massively left Lysychansk" with "seized cars from the population and in parking lots;" Russian ITAR-TASS reported the same day that the separatists had "decided to leave the town in order to save the population and stop clashes." This was mainly because their defeat in the Siege of Sloviansk and the evacuation of Kramatorsk made holding the city untenable.

The next day, heavy fighting continued around the town while the Ukrainian National Guard and the Ukrainian army released a statement that stated "the military plan to free Lysychansk, Luhansk Oblast, from terrorist groups in the near future." On 24 July 2014 the Ukrainian army claimed its troops had entered Lysychansk and its Col. Andriy Lysenko stated "We will take the town, and the road will be open to Horlivka, then Donetsk." On 25 July 2014, Ukrainian forces secured the city from the pro-Russian separatists.

===== Initial recovery =====
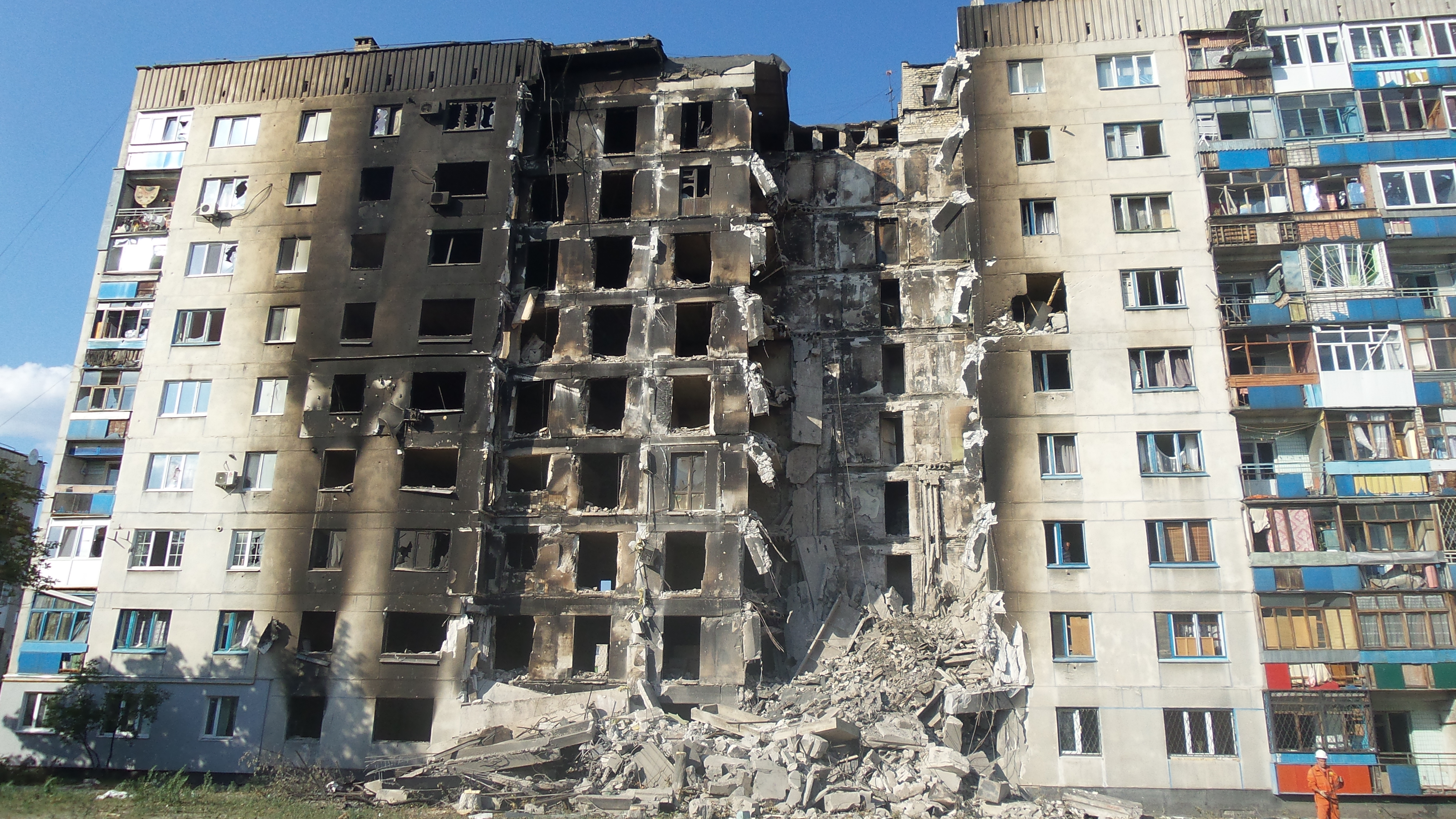
Damaged building in Lysychansk, 2014

After the city's recapture, with the city's housing heavily destroyed, extensive aid was sent. Large-scale Ukrainian humanitarian aid was sent from the cities of Kyiv, Kharkiv, and Dnipro, and work was done on demining due to heavy mine contamination. Other key players were the Red Cross, who helped with the city's hospital, the volunteer platform "Building Ukraine Together", Donbas SOS, and international aid from the Japanese government. One of the most destroyed areas in the city was Apartment Building No. 17, which led to over 250 people being displaced, and 25 million hryvnias being given in compensation to the residents.

In 2018, train routes finally started to reconnect o Lysychansk, and a new urban culture centre was created, funded partly by USAID. During the COVID-19 pandemic, the city was hit hard, following within the "red zone" classification, especially with understaffed hospitals and dated Soviet equipment. In July 2020, President Volodymyr Zelenskyy decided to sign a decree reestablishing the civil-military administration, which had previously been dissolved in 2015 by Petro Poroshenko. Under Poroshenko, the system had been set up in 2015 due to the city's proximity to the demarcation line. Later that year, as part of administrative reform, the city underwent significant changes. It was made the centre of the Lysychansk urban hromada, transferred to the newly created Sievierodonetsk Raion, and had its designation as a city of regional significance removed (the designation was abolished entirely nationwide). More compensation was also given by the government in December for war-destroyed housing. In 2021, Zelenskyy liquidated the military administration again.

===== Russian invasion of Ukraine =====
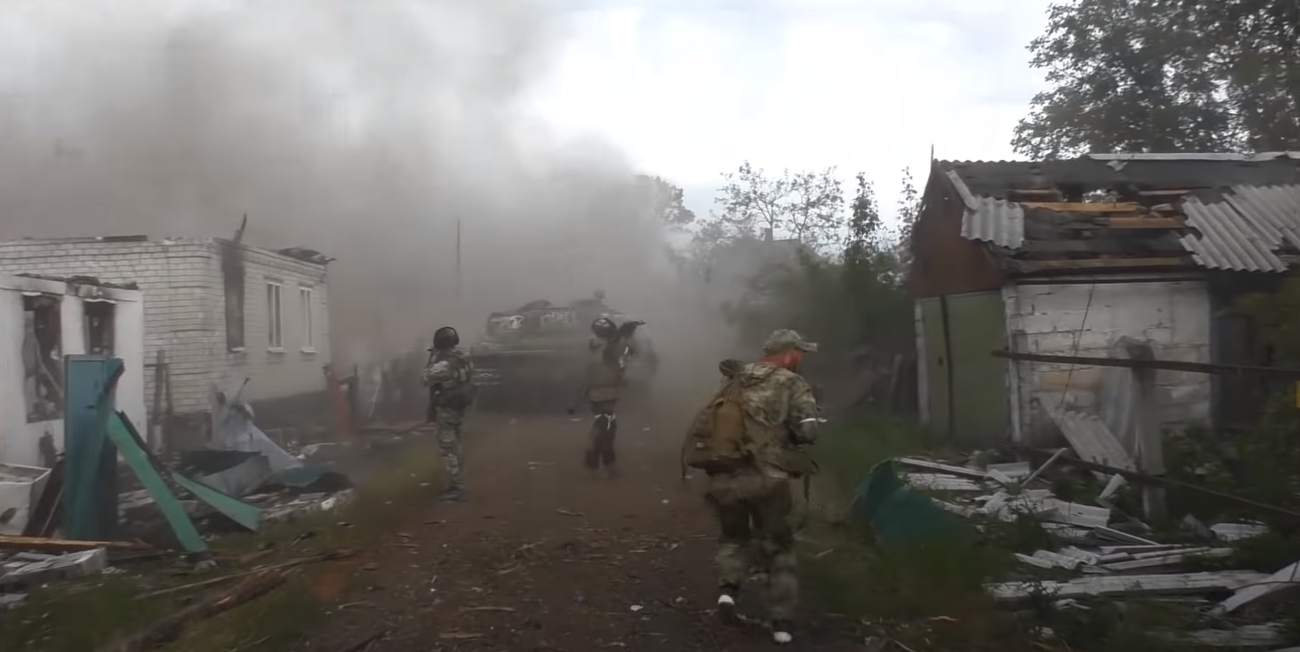
Pro-Russian forces advance towards Lysychansk, June 2022

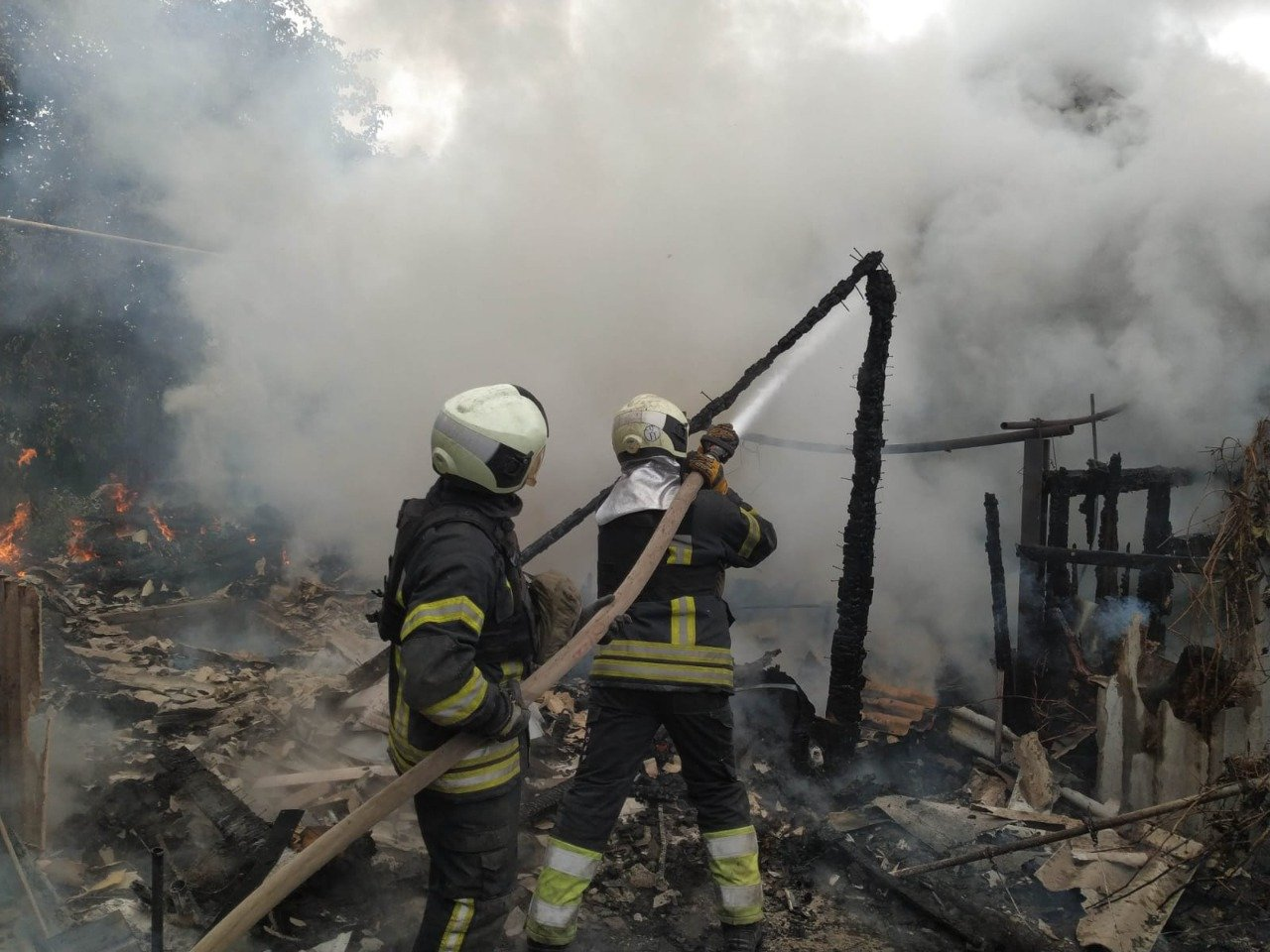
Ukrainian firefighters dousing flames following Russian strikes, July 2022.

During the Russian invasion of Ukraine, Lysychansk came under heavy shelling from the Russian military. Some of the most intense strikes occurred late in March 2022, which destroyed dozens of buildings and caused civilian casualties. On 9 May 2022, Russian troops attempted to cross over the Seversky Donets river with a temporary pontoon bridge near Bilohorivka. Ukrainian forces anticipated this approach, monitored the bridge construction, bombing the bridge and Russian vehicles who already crossed resulting in severe Russian losses. Russia made several such attempts, many of which were neutralized by Ukrainian forces.

After the Russian capture of Sievierodenetsk, Lysychansk became the last major city in the Luhansk Oblast under Ukrainian control. On 26 June, TASS reported that Russian forces entered the city from five directions. On 27 June, the CNN reported that civilians in Lysychansk have been urged to leave immediately, as Russian forces gain ground in the city.

On 2 July 2022, reports of Ukrainian troops withdrawing from the city and Russian forces moving in were supported by multiple videos from Ramzan Kadyrov's 141st Special Motorized Regiment declaring victory in front of the City Council of Lysychansk. "After heavy fighting for Lysychansk, the defence forces of Ukraine were forced to withdraw from their occupied positions and lines," the army general staff said. Earlier, Russia's Defence Minister Sergei Shoigu said his forces had captured Lysychansk and taken full control of Luhansk region. Ukraine's troops were outgunned there. The general staff said that "in order to preserve the lives of Ukrainian defenders, a decision was made to withdraw".

According to reports after the capture, only at most 12,000 remained in the city. There was no telephone service, water, or electricity within the city. The damage to the city was large, but not as bad as in nearby Sievierodonetsk because most of the fighting was not within the central parts of the city. Among the most notable buildings destroyed were the Lysychansk State Mining and Industrial College. On 3 February 2024, a Ukrainian missile strike hit the city. Russian-installed authorities said 28 people were killed, including multiple high-ranking officials, such as Aleksei Poteleshchenko, who was the Emergency Situations Minister, and two deputies of the Russian-installed municipal district of Lysychansk. After the city's capture, Lysychansk frequently remained without basic services, as neither mobile nor internet service worked within the city as of May 2025. That same year, it was reported that the Russian authorities had begun to confiscate the property of those who had fled to Ukrainian-held cities.

== Geography ==
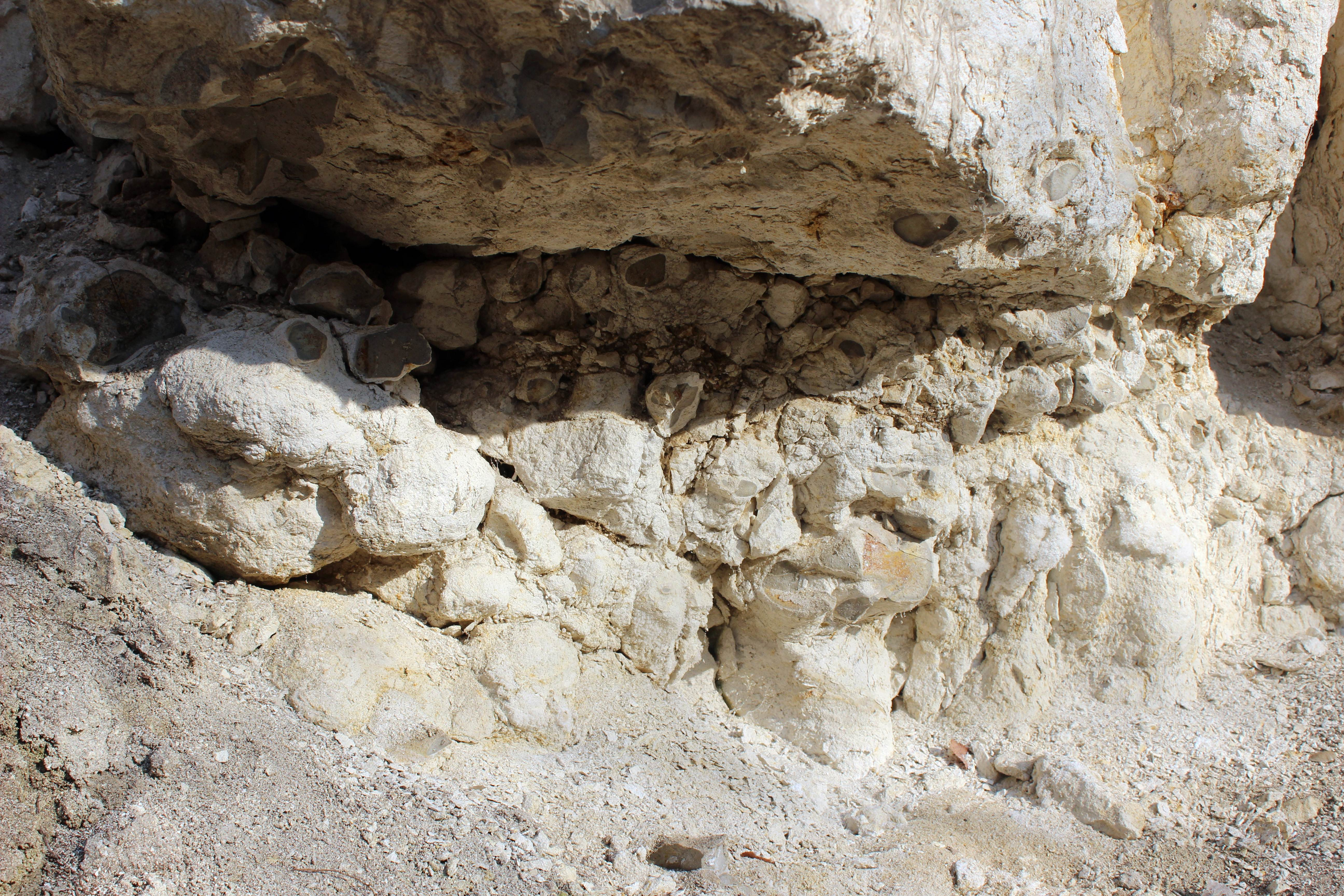
Congressiv Yar

Lysychansk is located in the North-Western part of the Luhansk Oblast, 90 km from Luhansk, on the high right bank of the Siverskyi Donets River. The area is surrounded by large hills, ravines and valleys. The city is situated on the northern spur of the Donets Ridge. The city is very prone to landslides due to its extensive use as a coal mining area, and is the most landslide-affected area within the oblast. A 1990s study mapped 27 landslides, including a major one in 1998 that damaged many residential buildings. It has been suggested that there is a need for an anti-landslide monitoring station due to this to track them. Within the city is Congressiv Yar, which is a protected area as a geological monument of national significance since 1975. It is 20 hectares and is famous for exposing the North Donets Thrust, with the walls of the ravine showing layers from the Carboniferous period against younger layers from the Triassic through the Cretaceous period.

Lysychansk lies in the continental climate of the steppe zone of Ukraine. Water resources stemming from here are one of the most important resources. Siverskyi Donets River is the main water artery of Lysychansk and the whole region. The length of the Siverskyi Donets River within the city is 26.5 km. Verkhnia Bilenka River, a tributary of the Siverskyi Donets River, flows through the southern part of the city; the length of the river within the city is 7.7 km.

=== Climate ===
Lysychansk has a humid continental climate (Dfb) according to the Köppen climate classification system.

Summers are warm and sometimes humid with average high temperatures of 26–27 °C (79–81 °F) and lows of 14–15 °C (57–59 °F). Winters are relatively cold with average high temperatures of −1 °C (30 °F) and lows of −8 to −6 °C (18 to 21 °F). Spring and autumn are generally chilly to mild. The highest ever temperature recorded in the city was 41.0 °C (105.8 °F) in June 1984. The coldest temperature ever recorded in the city was −34.0 °C (−29.2 °F) in February 1954.

Annual precipitation is 480 millimetres (19 inches) with moderate rainfall throughout the year. Light snowfall mainly occurs from December through March, but snow cover does not usually remain for long.

Climate data for Lysychansk
Month	Jan	Feb	Mar	Apr	May	Jun	Jul	Aug	Sep	Oct	Nov	Dec	Year
Record high °C (°F)	16.0 (60.8)	17.0 (62.6)	23.0 (73.4)	31.0 (87.8)	37.0 (98.6)	41.0 (105.8)	40.0 (104.0)	40.0 (104.0)	36.0 (96.8)	31.0 (87.8)	21.0 (69.8)	16.0 (60.8)	41.0 (105.8)
Mean daily maximum °C (°F)	−3.0 (26.6)	−2.0 (28.4)	5.0 (41.0)	15.0 (59.0)	22.0 (71.6)	26.0 (78.8)	28.0 (82.4)	27.0 (80.6)	21.0 (69.8)	13.0 (55.4)	4.0 (39.2)	0.0 (32.0)	13.0 (55.4)
Daily mean °C (°F)	−6.0 (21.2)	−5.0 (23.0)	1.6 (34.9)	9.5 (49.1)	15.5 (59.9)	20.0 (68.0)	22.0 (71.6)	21.0 (69.8)	15.0 (59.0)	11.0 (51.8)	1.0 (33.8)	−3.0 (26.6)	8.5 (47.3)
Mean daily minimum °C (°F)	−9 (16)	−8 (18)	−3.0 (26.6)	4.0 (39.2)	9.0 (48.2)	14.0 (57.2)	16.0 (60.8)	15.0 (59.0)	9.0 (48.2)	3.0 (37.4)	−2.0 (28.4)	−6 (21)	3.5 (38.3)
Record low °C (°F)	−32.0 (−25.6)	−34.0 (−29.2)	−22.0 (−7.6)	−11.0 (12.2)	−3.0 (26.6)	−3.0 (26.6)	6.0 (42.8)	4.0 (39.2)	−5.0 (23.0)	−12.0 (10.4)	−24.0 (−11.2)	−29.0 (−20.2)	−34.0 (−29.2)
Average rainfall mm (inches)	32.0 (1.26)	30.0 (1.18)	36.0 (1.42)	37.0 (1.46)	48.0 (1.89)	53.0 (2.09)	61.0 (2.40)	34.0 (1.34)	45.0 (1.77)	31.0 (1.22)	37.0 (1.46)	36.0 (1.42)	480 (18.91)
Average rainy days (≥ 1.0 mm)	6.0	5.0	7.0	9.0	9.0	8.0	7.0	5.0	7.0	9.0	9.0	8.0	89
Source: Microsoft Corporation program "Weather"

== Legal status and politics ==
=== Government ===
The city of Lysychansk is governed by the Lysychansk City Council. The city council, as of 2015, consists of 36 deputies. Until 2020, it was a city of regional significance, however, in July 2020, as part of administrative reform, Zelenskyy abolished this system and incorporated Lysychansk into the Lysychansk urban hromada of the Sievierodonetsk Raion.

Starting in August 2020, the self-government, the city council, was temporarily suspended and replaced with a civil-military administration. It was decided to establish this because it was determined that the area was still unsafe, and that the planned October 2020 local elections would not be viable in the region. The city had earlier been under civil-military administration under Poroshenko briefly in 2015. In June 2022, the administration was reorganised to be a solely military administration because of the ongoing battle. Since the city's occupation by Russian forces in July 2022, the Russians considered the city part of the Luhansk People's Republic, which was annexed into Russia in September of that year. Under the LPR, the city was not put under a raion, instead becoming a city of federal subject significance, with its own urban okrug.

=== Politics ===
After Ukrainian independence, like most of the Donbas, the city's voters generally favoured the proponents of continued close ties to Russia, namely first the Communist Party of Ukraine and then from the 2000s the Party of Regions. Since 2015, Lysychansk has not regularly held local elections for its city council due to sometimes being under a civil-military administration due to its proximity to the demarcation line or elections being declared invalid. However, elections have still occasionally taken place. In 2015, both the mayoral election and city council elections went ahead, although initially both elections were said to be declared invalid, which was later refuted. In the mayor election that year, candidate Sergey Shilin, nominated by the Opposition Bloc, a pro-Russian party, won 54.43% of the vote. However, in comparison to previous years, the number of pro-European votes also increased, with Vitaliy Shvedov, who was affiliated with the Poroshenko-led European Solidarity party, trailing behind at 18.07%. In the city council elections, 24 deputies were elected from the Opposition Bloc (66%), 6 from Solidarity, 3 from Self Reliance (also a pro-European party), and 3 from the Radical Party of Oleh Liashko (a Ukrainian nationalistic party).

In terms of presidential elections, in the 2004 Ukrainian presidential election, Viktor Yanukovych won 92.51% of the vote in Lysychansk, while the runner-up Viktor Yushchenko received 5.08% of the vote. In the 2010 Ukrainian presidential election, Viktor Yanukovych won 90.95% of the vote in Lysychansk, while the runner-up Yulia Tymoshenko received 5.91% of the vote. During the following presidential election in 2014, Lysychansk did not vote because at the time it was controlled by the LPR.

== Demographics ==
=== Population ===
Historical population
Year	Pop.	±%
1926	6,624	—
1939	26,181	+295.2%
1959	37,878	+44.7%
1970	117,752	+210.9%
1979	119,487	+1.5%
1989	126,503	+5.9%
2001	115,229	−8.9%
2011	105,689	−8.3%
2022	93,340	−11.7%

According to the 2001 All-Ukrainian Census, the only official nationwide post-independence census done in Ukraine, the population of Lysychansk in 2001 was 115,229. The most recent estimate was done by the State Statistics Service of Ukraine in 2022, which estimated that the total population in the city was 93,340. After the population steadily grew from the 6,624 figure first recorded in 1926, the population reached a peak in 1989, shortly before Ukrainian independence, with a population of 126,503. The city first reached the 100,000 mark with the 1970 census, and remained above 100,000 people until 2017. The number of people in the city has only continued to decline due to the economy and, more recently, the War in the Donbas and subsequently the Russian invasion of Ukraine. As of 1 January 2014, just before the War in the Donbas, the population of Lysychansk was 103,459. By 2022, during the battle for the city in the Russian invasion of Ukraine, at most 12,000 people remained in the city.

==== Ethnicity ====
Ethnic group	1939	2001
Ukrainians	71.97%	66.66%
Russians	24.67%	30.55%
Jews	1.27%	N/A
Belarusians	0.825%	0.99%

In terms of ethnic groups living in Lysychansk, ethnic Ukrainians constitute a large majority, followed by a very significant Russian minority, as well as a noticeable Belarusian community. Other minority groups are Tatars, Armenians, Moldovans and Azerbaijani Turks. In the earliest census prior to this that recorded ethnicity, the 1939 census, the population was also very similar then, being almost all monolithically Russian or Ukrainian. Ukrainians made up more of a majority than in the 2001 census, at nearly 72% of the population, with ethnic Russians comprising 25% of the city also. The city also had a small minority of Belarusians and Tatars, although it also had a larger minority of Jewish people at 1.27%. The Jewish population would significantly decline after this due to the Holocaust.

The exact ethnic situation was as follows in 2001:

Ethnic groups in Lysychansk
	percent
Ukrainians	66.66%
Russians	30.55%
Belarusians	0.99%
Tatars	0.43%
Armenians	0.16%
Azerbaijanis	0.13%
Moldovans	0.12%
Poles	0.10%
Georgians	0.07%
others	0.79%

=== Language ===
According to the 2001 All-Ukrainian Census, Lysychansk's majority population had a mother tongue of Russian as their language (64.6%), with a significant minority (33.7%) speaking Ukrainian as their mother tongue. There were also small populations of other languages, such as Belarusian and Armenian. The exact linguistic situation was as follows:

Native languages in Lysychansk
	percent
Russian	64.6%
Ukrainian	33.7%
Belarusian	0.1%
Armenian	0.1%
Romani	0.1%
others	0.3%

== Cityscape ==
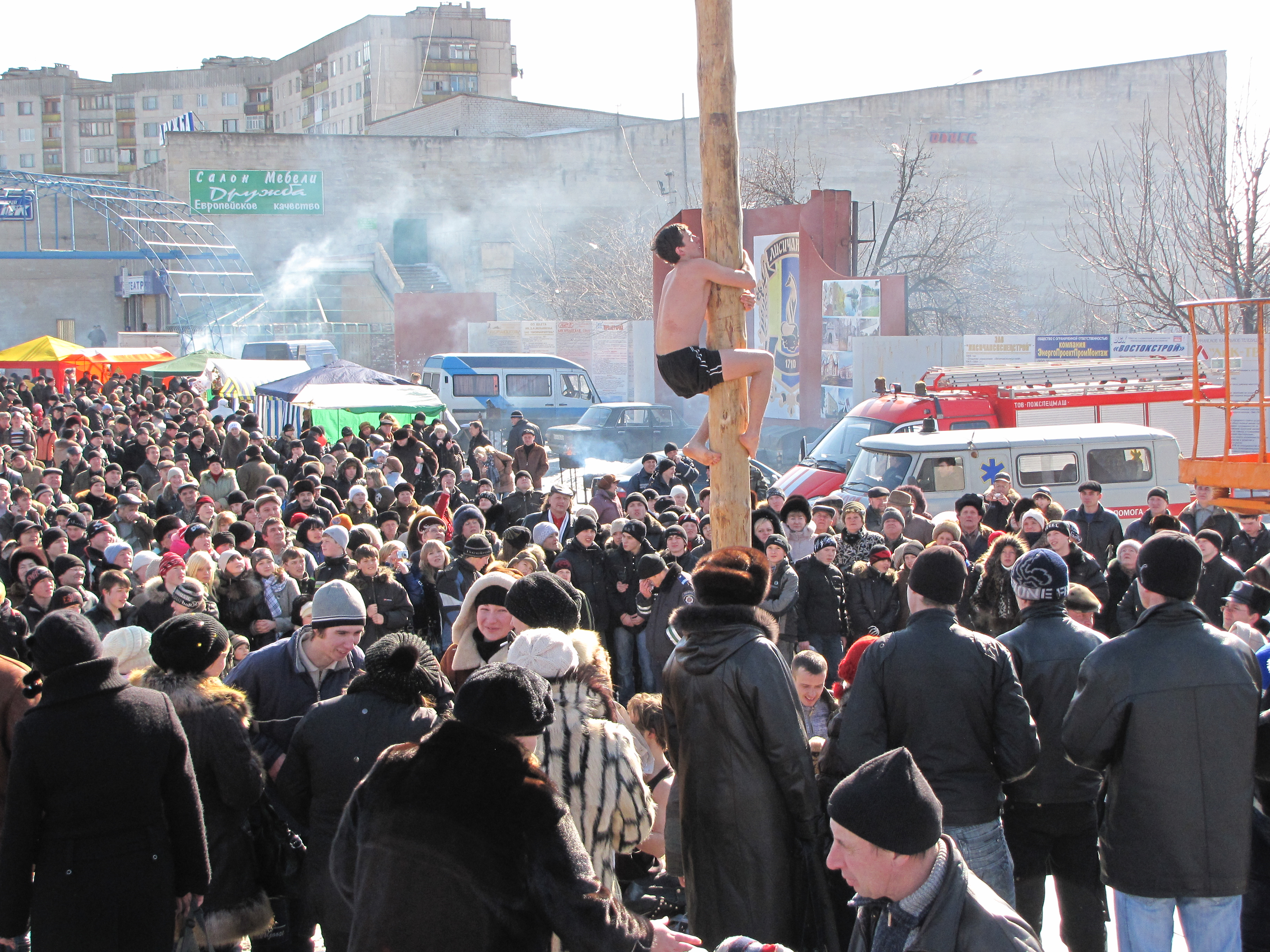
Carnival-Maslenitsa

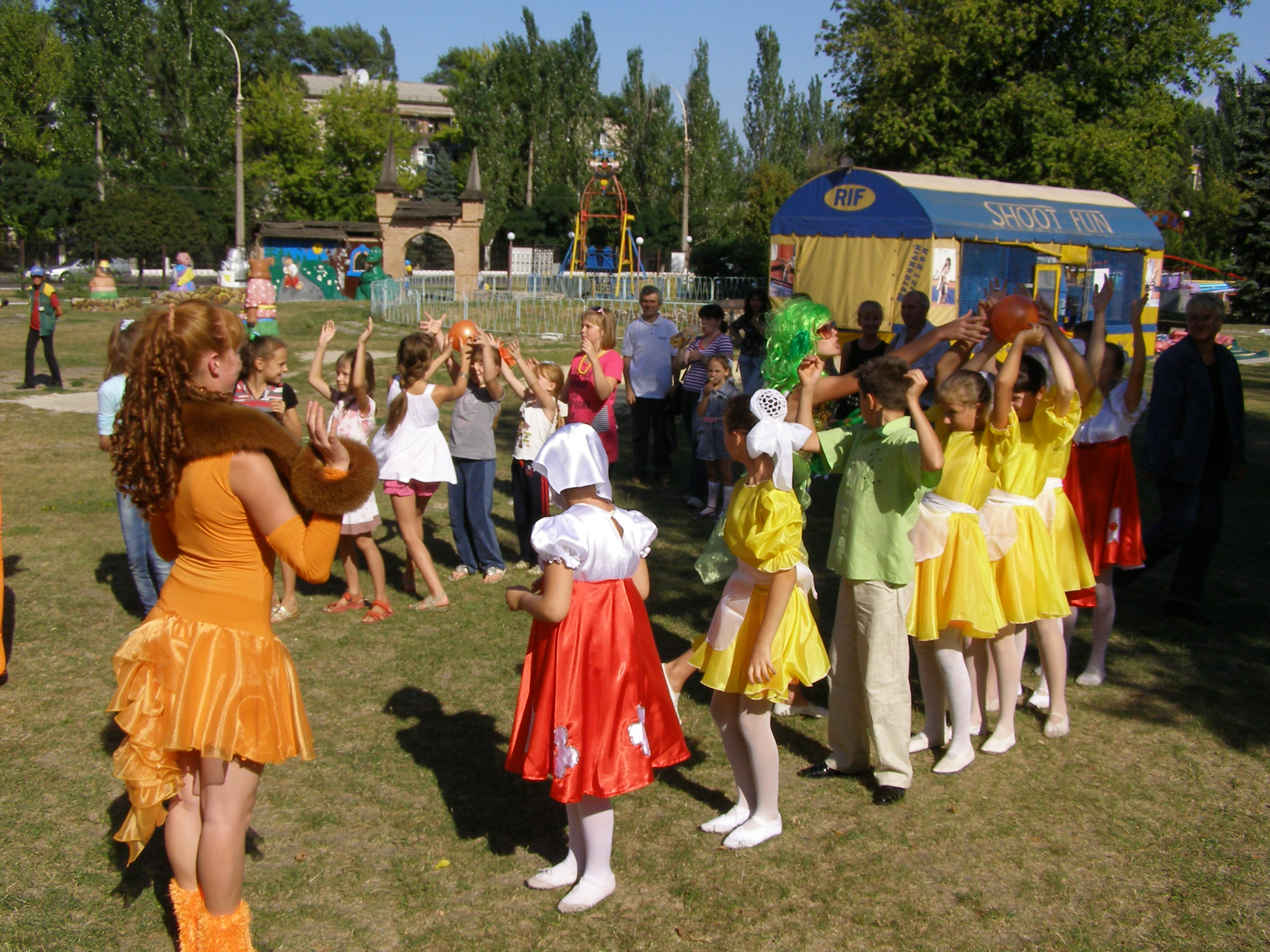
Carnival-Maksim Park

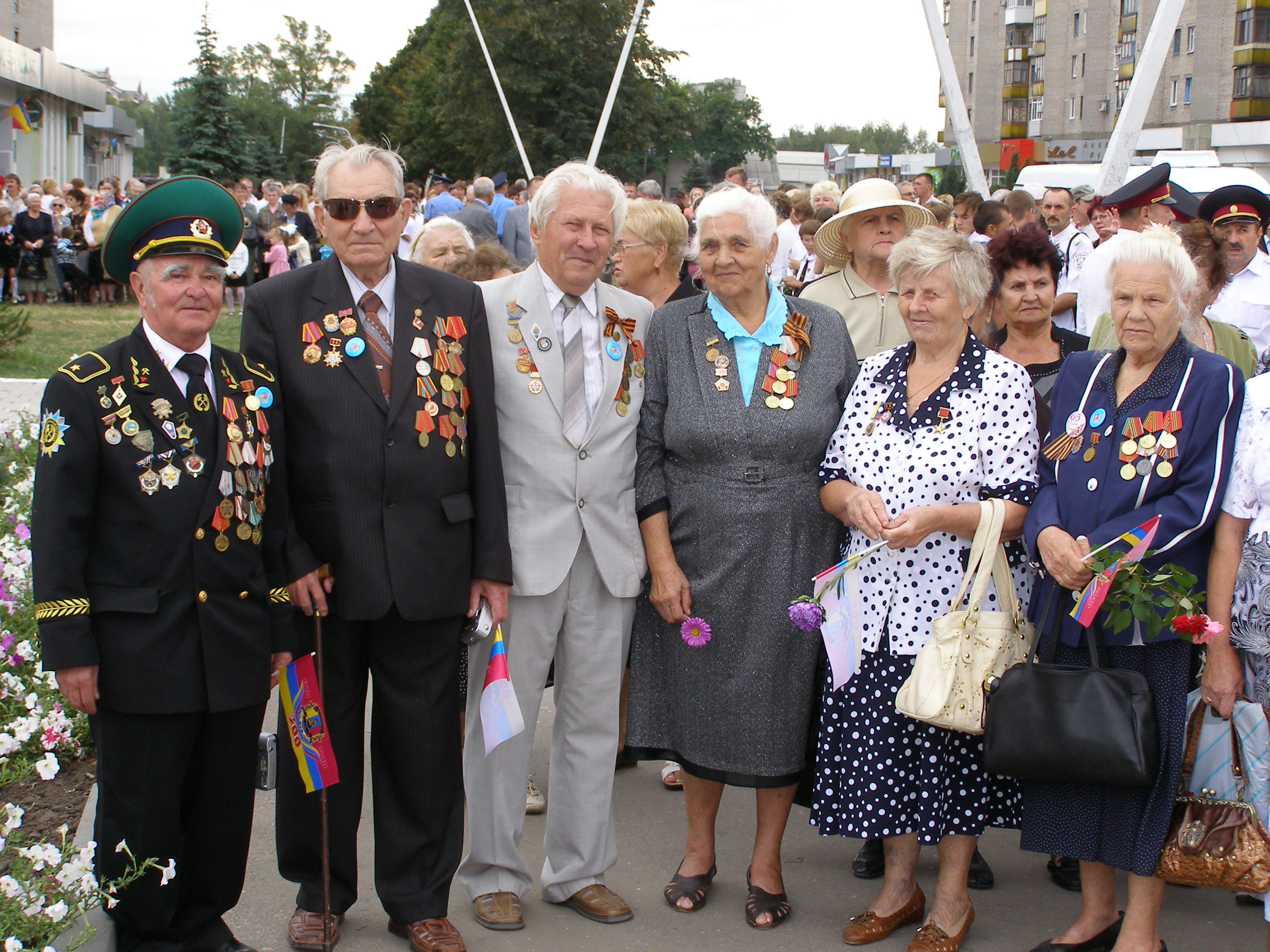
War veterans

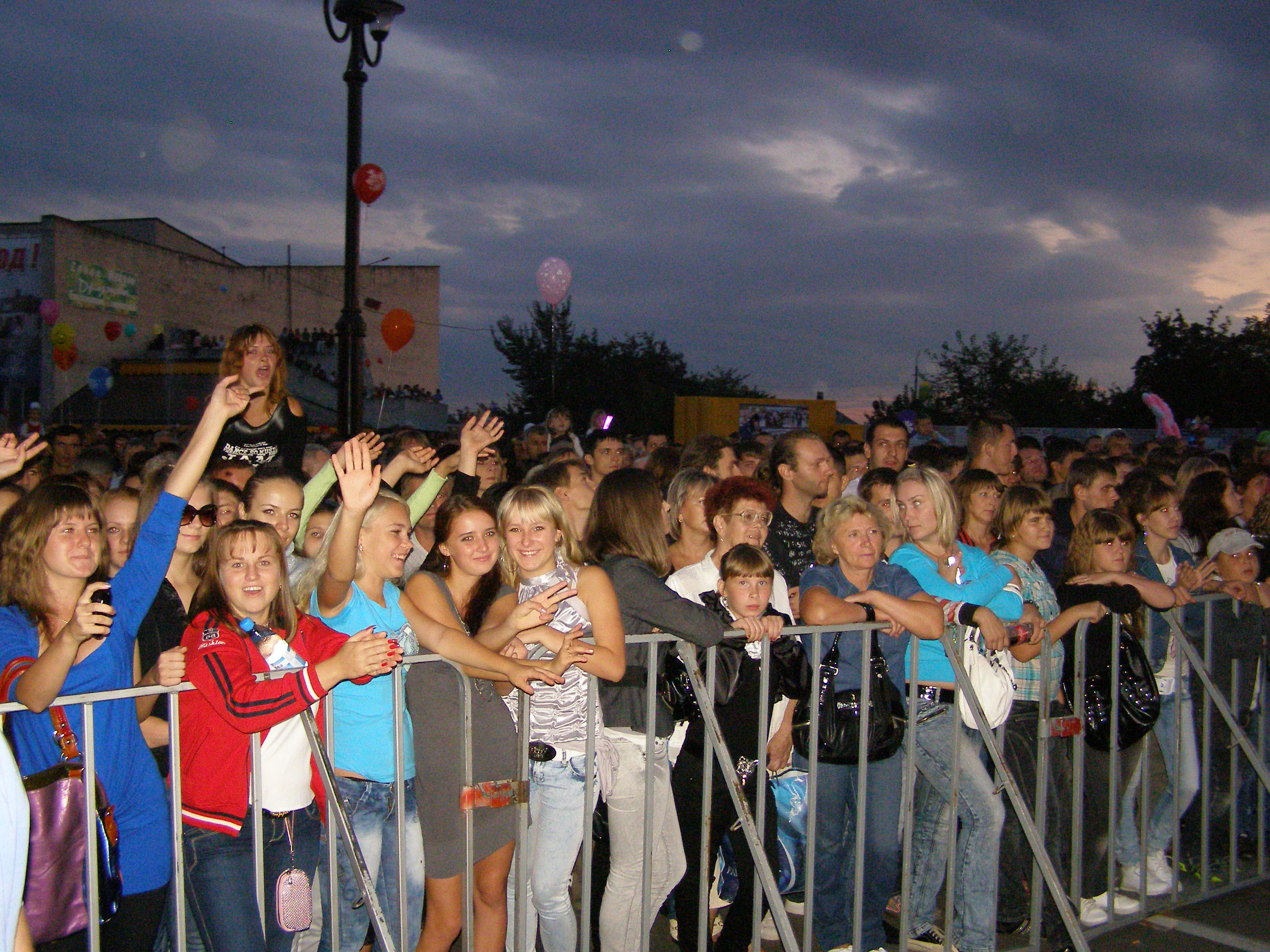
City Day

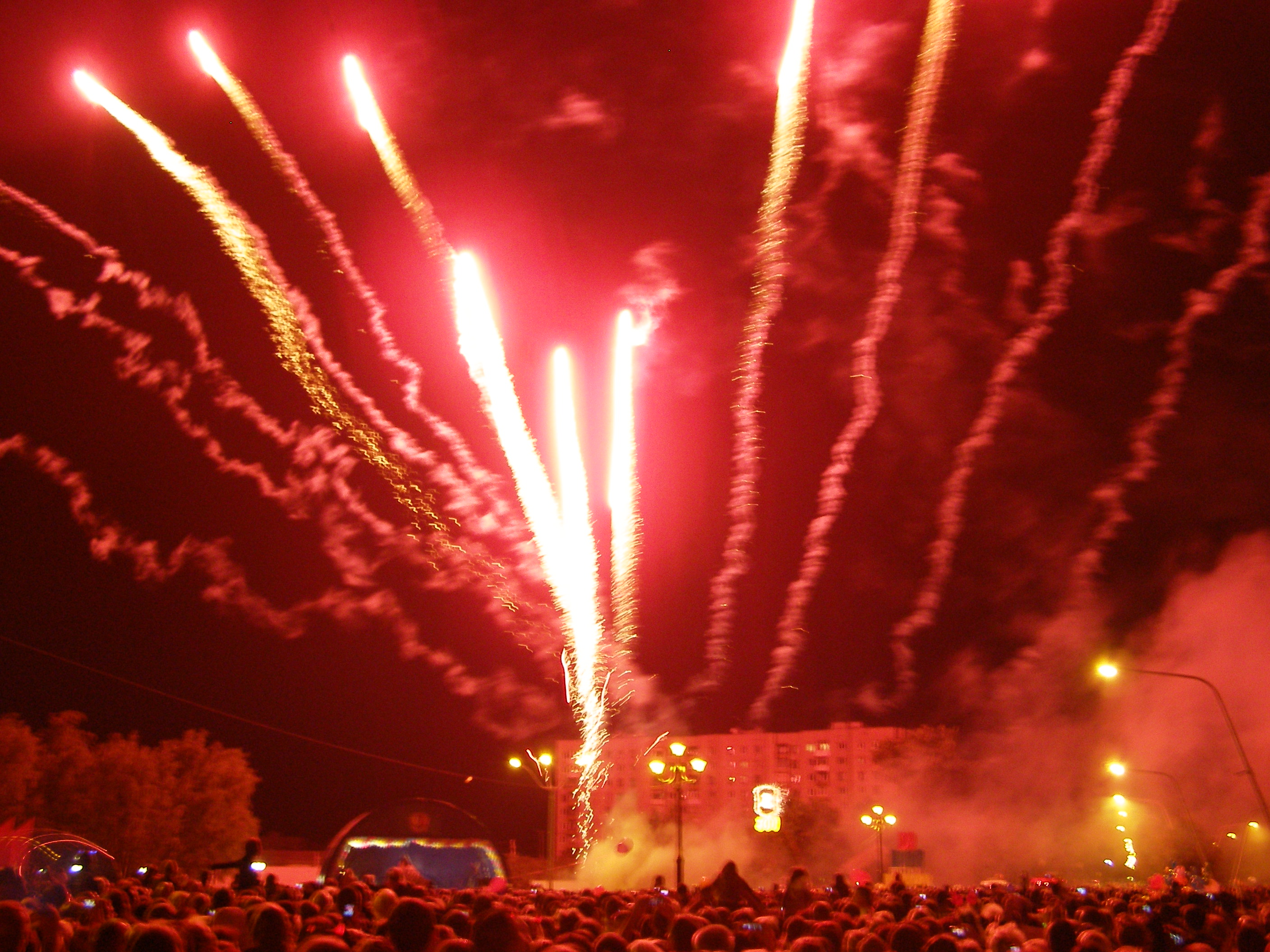
City Day

=== Architecture ===
As of 2019, the city has 16 registered monuments of local significance, with 14 more on a tentative listing. Nearly all of the registered monuments are designated under architectural significance, except a sole monument that is designated of monumental art significance, which is a bust of Volodymyr Sosiura. However, most of the registered monuments still do not have a protection zone because they were never formally approved by the city council, although in 2019, a study by the Ukrainian State Institute of Cultural Heritage, heavily recommended this.

The city's oldest surviving buildings are the single-storey peasant houses in the northern part of the city. They are located in the former area of Rubizhne, and 10 such buildings survive, with the best-perseved one being at 25 Rubizhne Street. It was proposed variously to protect these buildings under heritage listing. As Lysychansk developed, the city was variously designed in Classicism, Art Nouveau, and neoclassicism. Of the city's historic buildings, most of those that were destroyed were during the Soviet era, especially the historic churches, although two still survive: the Church of St. Mitrophan and the Church of St. Nicholas. Other buildings that survived and that weren't destroyed were the Steiger School Building from 1872, the Zhovtnevyi Cinema built in 1914, and the Palace of Culture from 1930.

== Media ==
=== Newspapers ===
The city is host to 12 online newspapers. The city's main newspaper is New Path (Новый путь; Новый путь), which was founded in 1918, originally as Voice of Labour. The newspaper adopted its current name in 1962, and shortly thereafter received an honorary citation from the Supreme Soviet in 1968 for its work. It was housed at 279th Division Street until the War in the Donbas, when the offices were moved to Sievierodonetsk. In 2017, it was the first formerly municipally owned newspaper in Luhansk Oblast to be de-nationalised, transitioning to staff ownership. As of 2017, it issues 7,100 copies per week in a weekly 12-page issue, and prints in both Ukrainian and Russian. The other main newspaper in the city is a business weekly known as Business Week (Діловий тиждень).

=== Radio ===
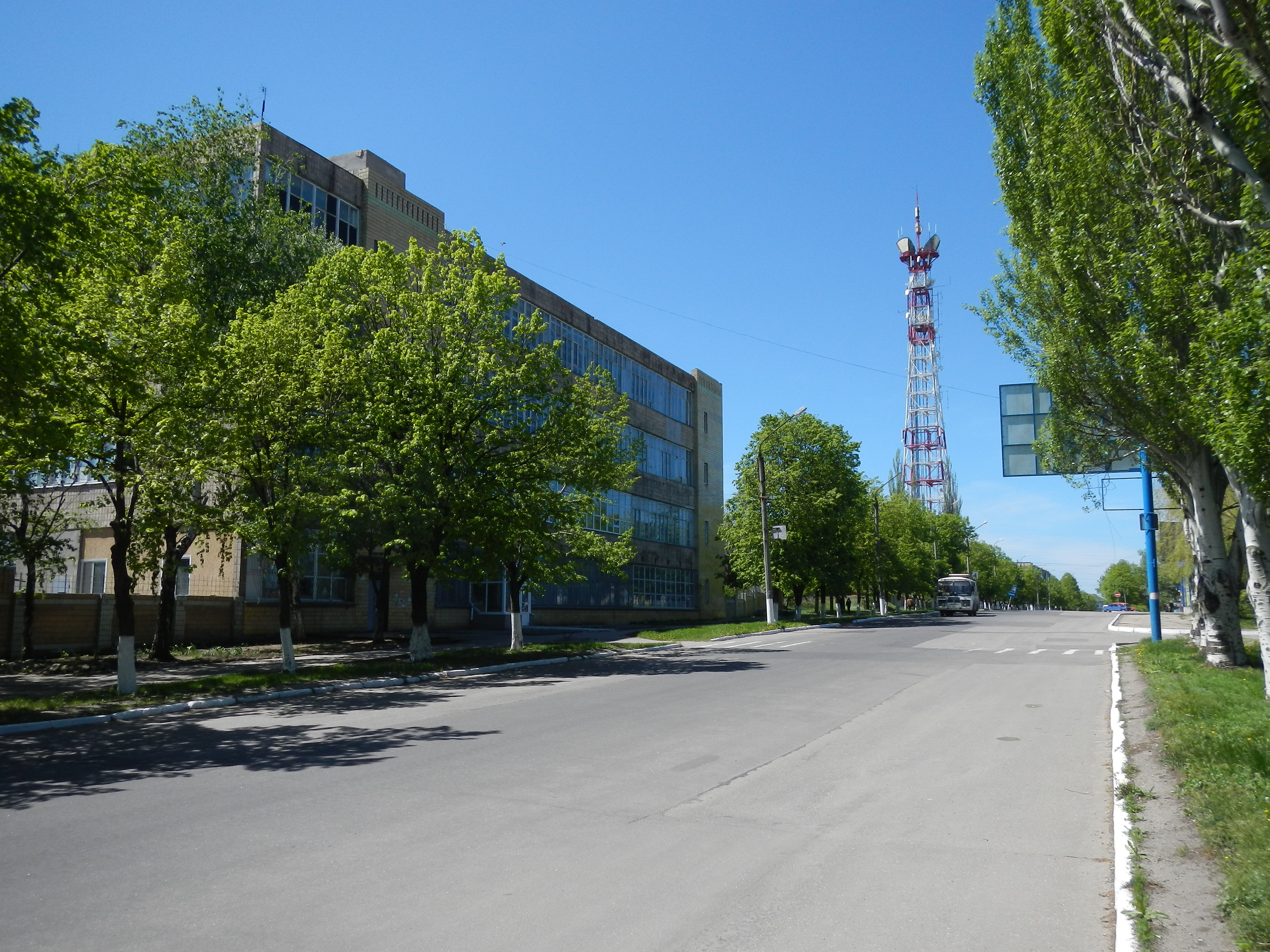
Transmission tower in Lysychansk in the background.

The city has a transmission tower, which was built in 1957 and renovated in 1970. It hosts 12 radio stations, and does not have its own local channel. The radio stations, as of August 2019, include:

- Hromadske Radio (87.8 MHz), a national radio station. It began broadcasting in the city on 12 December 2016.
- UA: Ukraine Radio (88.2 MHz), a national channel that also relays news from other stations. It began broadcasting in Lysychansk in the summer of 2017.
- Army FM (98.6 MHz), a national radio station created by the Ministry of Defence of Ukraine. It started airing in Lysychansk in August 2019, replacing a broadcaster from Halychyna.
- Nashe Radio (91.1 MHz) plays only Ukrainian and Russian-language artists. Has been broadcasting in Lysychansk since July 2009.
- UA: Radio Promin (92.1 MHz), a national station that is Suspline's second channel. Started broadcasting in Lysychansk in April 2019.
- Radio 49 Paralel (96.0 MHz), a station based in Kyiv. It began operating in Lysychansk in August 2019, replacing Priamyi's slot, although Priamyi never actually broadcast in the city.
- Retro FM (101.5 MHz), plays classic hits, mostly from the 1970s to 1990s, including both Western and Soviet artists. Started broadcasting in Lysychansk in May 2006 when it was still known as Radio 5, until it changed its name in June 2007.
- Radio NV (102.0 MHz), a national news station, is also replaying Radio Svoboda's programs. It was originally known as Radio Era FM and began broadcasting in the city in 2007, before switching to news and becoming Radio NV in March 2018.
- Puls FM (105.9 MHz), a regional station meant for Luhansk Oblast. It began transmitting in Lysychansk in December 2015 after its central offices were seized in Luhansk.

=== Television ===
The city's transmission tower, built in 1957, also hosts 30 television stations. These include digital Multiplexes such as 1+1 Ukraine, ICTV, and NTN. There are also single-channel stations such as UA:Donbas and 5 Kanal. The most famous television channel in the city is the local television and radio company, Accent (Акцент). Accent runs on channel 33, although it also rebroadcasts Novyi Kanal. In August 2016, the company attracted significant controversy when a cameraman associated with the channel went to a city council session wearing a pro-Russian shirt, calling Russian soldiers involved in the 2014 Russian annexation of Crimea "ours".

== Religion ==
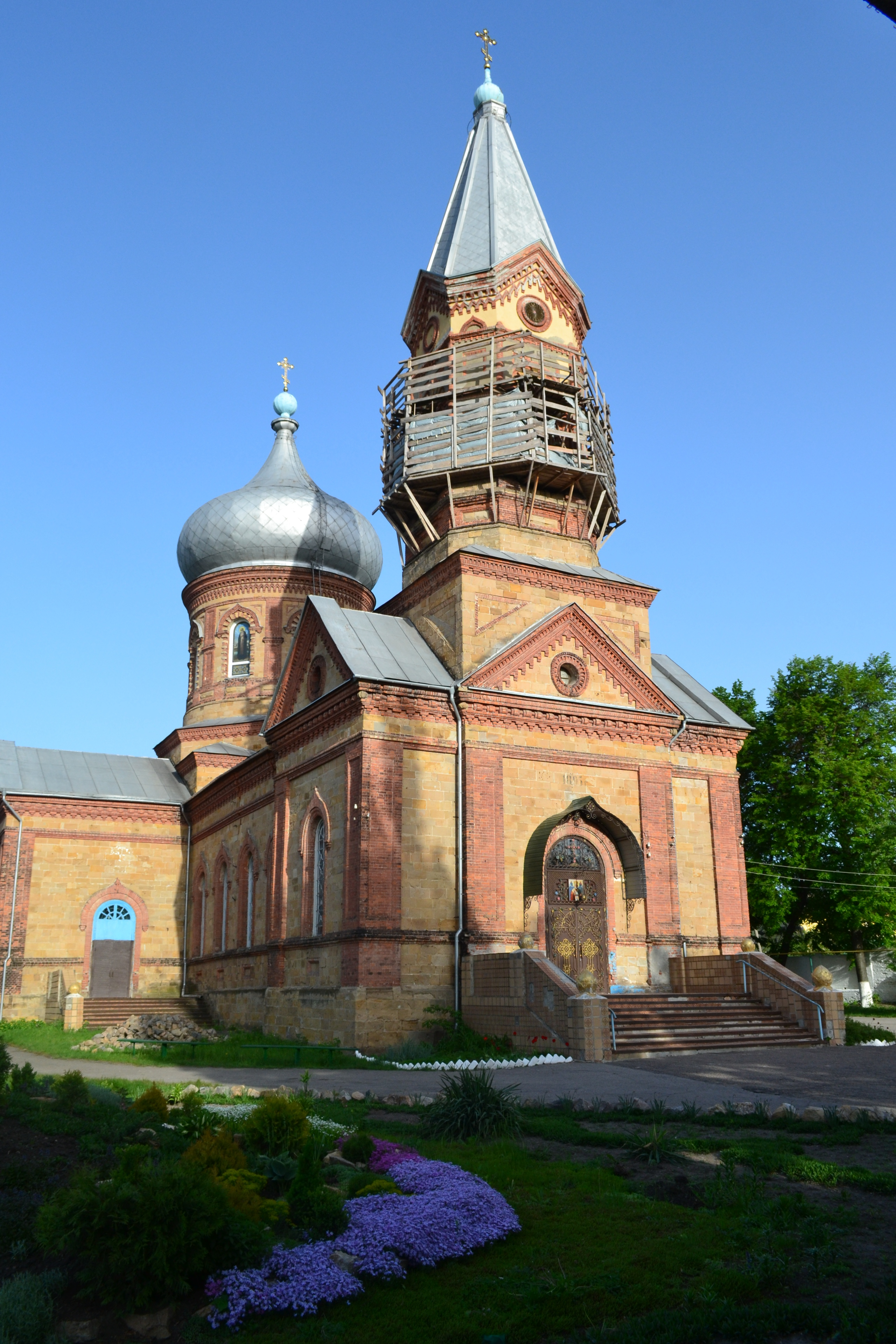
St. Nicholas Church

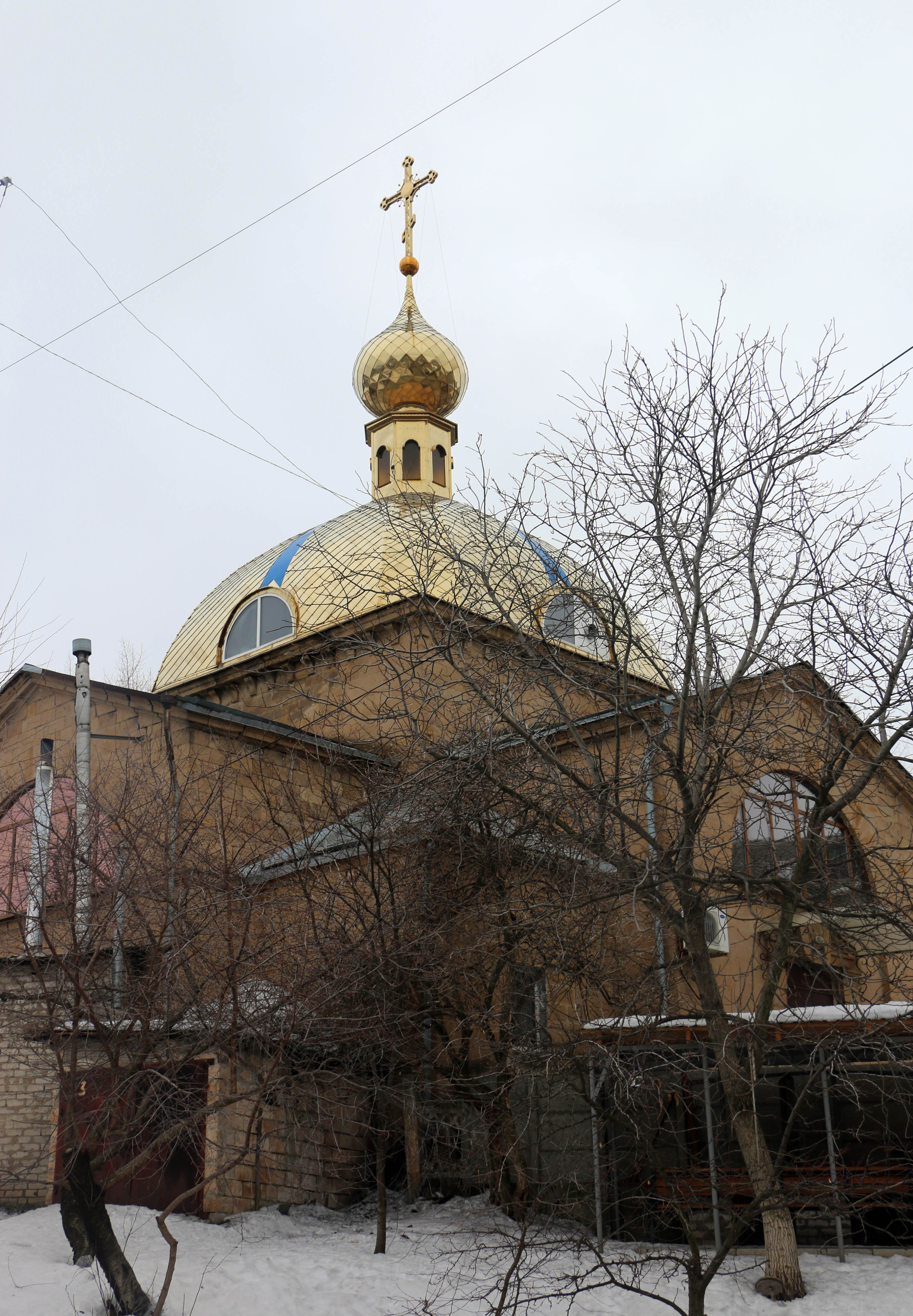
St. Mitrophan's Church

Lysychansk's residents belong to the religious traditions of the Ukrainian Orthodox Church (Moscow Patriarchate), Jehovah's Witnesses, and the Baptist Church, as well as in smaller numbers Judaism and the Ukrainian Greek Catholic Church. The city's two most notable churches are the Church of Saint Nicholas, built in 1895, and the Church of St. Mitrophan, built in 1846. The UOC-MP and UOC-KP, however, have had tensions in the city, especially in an incident in 2015 when Father Andrii Chmil of the UOC-KP visited to hold a memorial service for the city's liberation ceremony, with residents preventing the UOC-MP clergy from conducting the memorial service and insisting the UOC-KP do it, accusing the UOC-MP representatives in the city of supporting the LPR. Due to this, George Tuka held a meeting of all the religious leaders in Luhansk Oblast to pledge interfaith cooperation.

The vast majority of the city is affiliated with the Moscow Patriarchate, which is under the eparchy of Sievierodonetsk, where there is eight churches affiliated with it within the city. According to a report from 2018, no churches affiliated with the Ukrainian Orthodox Church – Kyiv Patriarchate exist, although the group was registered in the city online. In terms of the smaller communities, there is an active Jewish community under the Federation of Jewish Communities of Ukraine, chaired by Boris Ershengorin. The Baptist community founded the Transfiguration Church in the late 1990s for worship and has been notable for carrying out extensive social work. The Ukrainian Greek Catholic Church attempted to establish a presence starting in 2016, when they announced they would be building a church entitled the Church of the Protection of the Mother of God in Lysychansk. In 2020, Greek Catholics from Ivano-Frankivsk came to Lysychansk and built a small wooden chapel in a traditional Hutsul style.

After 2022, many of the religious communities came under attack by Russian forces. One of the city's churches, the Second Saint Mitrofan Church, sustained very severe fire damage from shelling in June 2022. In July 2022, after Russian forces entered the city, they raided the Baptist church that was holding its congregation, removing all the items inside and forcibly making the church a building for Russian troops.

== Culture ==
=== Attractions ===
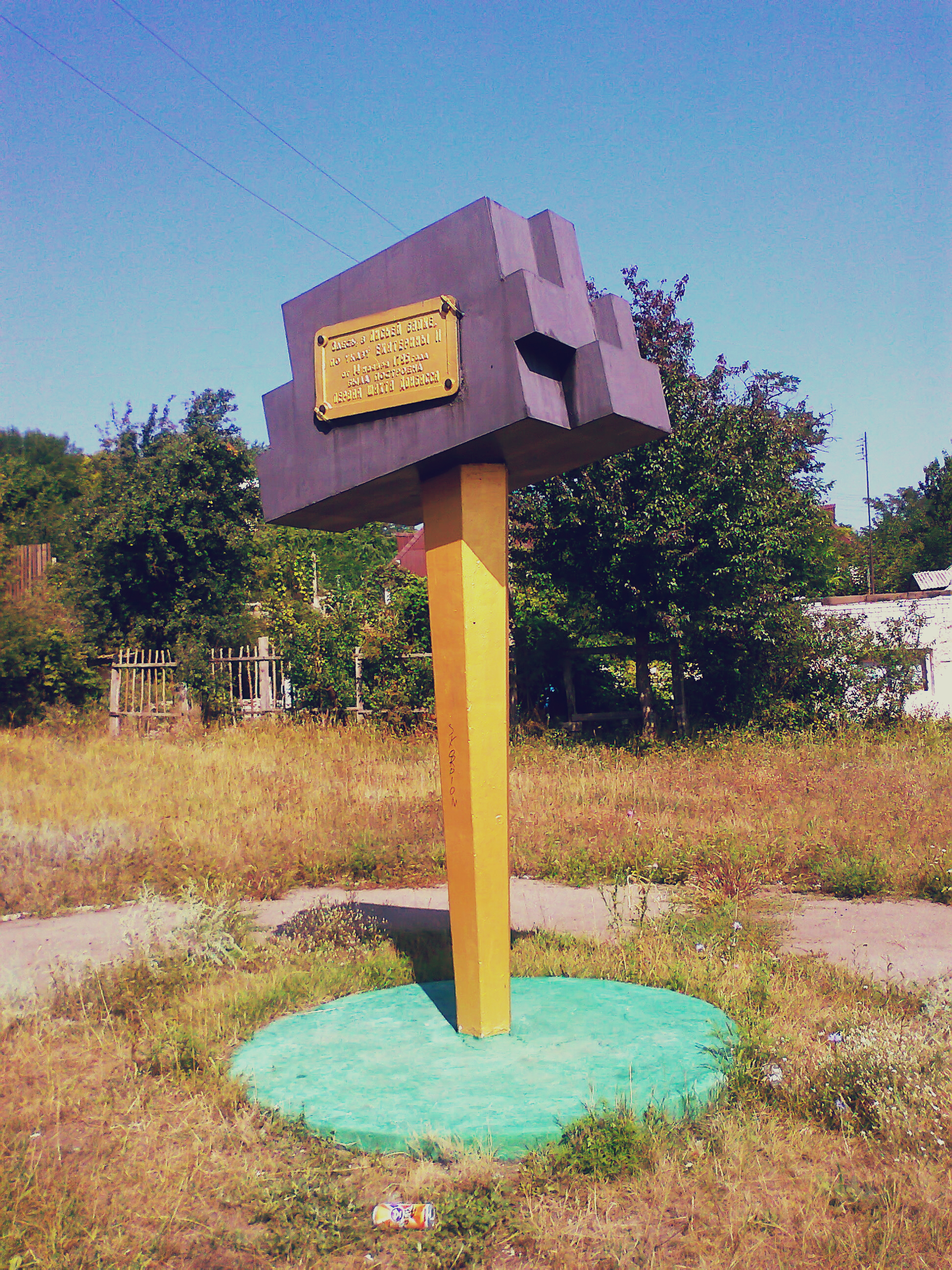
The monument to the first Donbas coal mine in Lysychansk

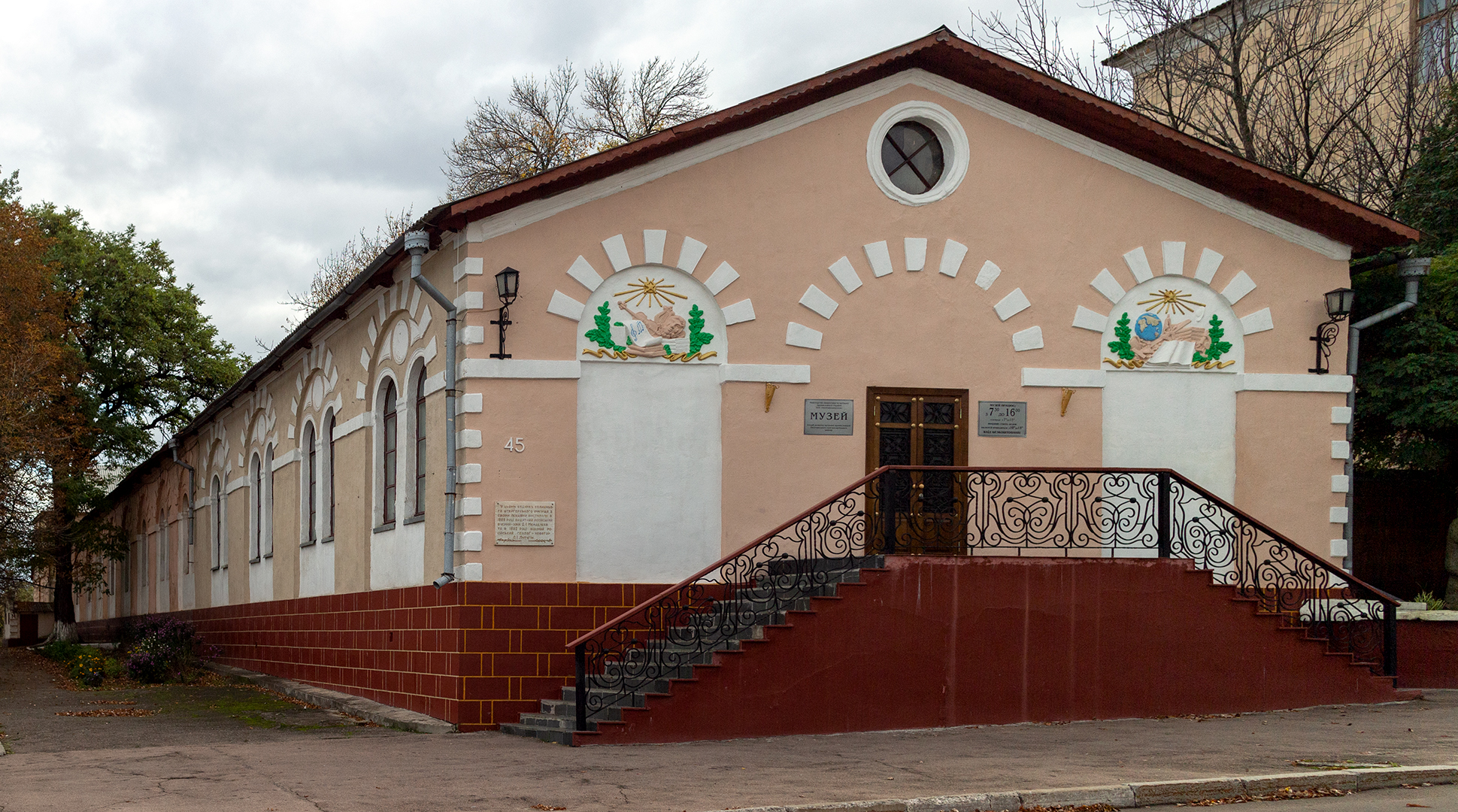
The former Steiger School, one of the first mining colleges. It is now a museum.

Near the front of the city stands a memorial marker that dates the mine's founding with a monument to Hyrhorii Kapustin, popularly believed to be the finder of the first coal. The Kapustin market was erected in 1960, and later it was decided to name one of the mines in his honour for the achievement. There is also another marker at the mining college for the 200th anniversary of Donbas, which is a granite monolith installed in 1995 in reference to the 1795 Catherine decree. There is also the Steiger School, which was one of the first mining colleges, with two Polovtsian stone women outside of it.

Lysychansk also has numerous war memorials due to the city's history. The most recent was a 1990 memorial to victims of the Holodomor near the slope leading to the Central Railway Station. There are, in total, 36 monuments to World War II, of which 19 are mass graves of Soviet soldiers (there are nearly 5,000 buried in those). Other notable World War II memorials include a T-34 tank designed by architect M. Ivanchenko in the city centre to commemorate the city's liberation, a monument to soldier-pilots with a former L-29 aircraft constructed in 2001, and the "Memory" complex also opened in 2001 with a dome chapel and granite walls recording the 20,000 Lysychansk residents who fought in the war. There is, in addition, a separate memorial to the Jewish people who were killed in the city during the Holocaust, which was unveiled in 2013 and funded by the Jewish community, Even-Ezer, and the city. The later conflicts covered in the city centre include a 1993 monument in Gagarin Square for people who fought in the Soviet-Afghan War, a monument in the RTI factory for local Chornobyl liquidators, and a monument to those who fought in the Anti-Terrorist Operation Zone (ATO) on the corner of Chervona and Zhovtneva streets. The ATO monument was unveiled on 14 October 2020, which was the Defender of Ukraine Day, with funds raised by people in the city.

There are also monuments to the famous poet Volodymyr Sosiura, who, while being born in Debaltseve, later moved to Verkhnie (now Lysychansk) to work at the Donets Soda Factory. The first is a monument designed by I. Ovcharenko at the glass factory district park in 1966. There is also the Palace of Culture that was originally named for the Lysychansk Glass Factory in 1954, before being renamed after him in 1965. There is also a museum to Sosiura, which houses his personal items, and a museum to the Lysychansk Glass Factory which were both housed at the Lysychansk Glass Factory before being moved to the Palace of Culture named after Sosiura. Near the Donets River is a separate park sculpture of the deer, which is a traditional gathering spot for sunrises.

=== Performing arts ===
Lysychansk briefly had its own theatre, but now most of these institutions are in its twin city. The theatre was the Lysychansk Drama Theatre, which was built in 1951 and located at the ITP Club under Volodymyr Ivanov. However, it was only located for three years before being relocated to Khmelnytskyi, and Ivanov relocated to Sievierodonetsk to found the Sievierodonetsk Drama Theatre. The city, however, does retain some amateur theatres. There is the children's theatre-studio "Arlekino" and the theatre group "Smile".

=== Music ===
The city has amateur music groups. The most prominent one is the People's Choral Chapel named for Ye. Manuilov, which was founded in 1964 and has won awards at the republican festivals of the Ukrainian SSR in 1967, 1970, and 1972. It was awarded its "People's" status in 1968. It still performs regularly, notably at Victory Day and City Day celebrations. There is also a men's vocal ensemble known as "Obriy", a brass band named for F. Titarenko, and a choral collective named Barvinok.

=== Museum ===
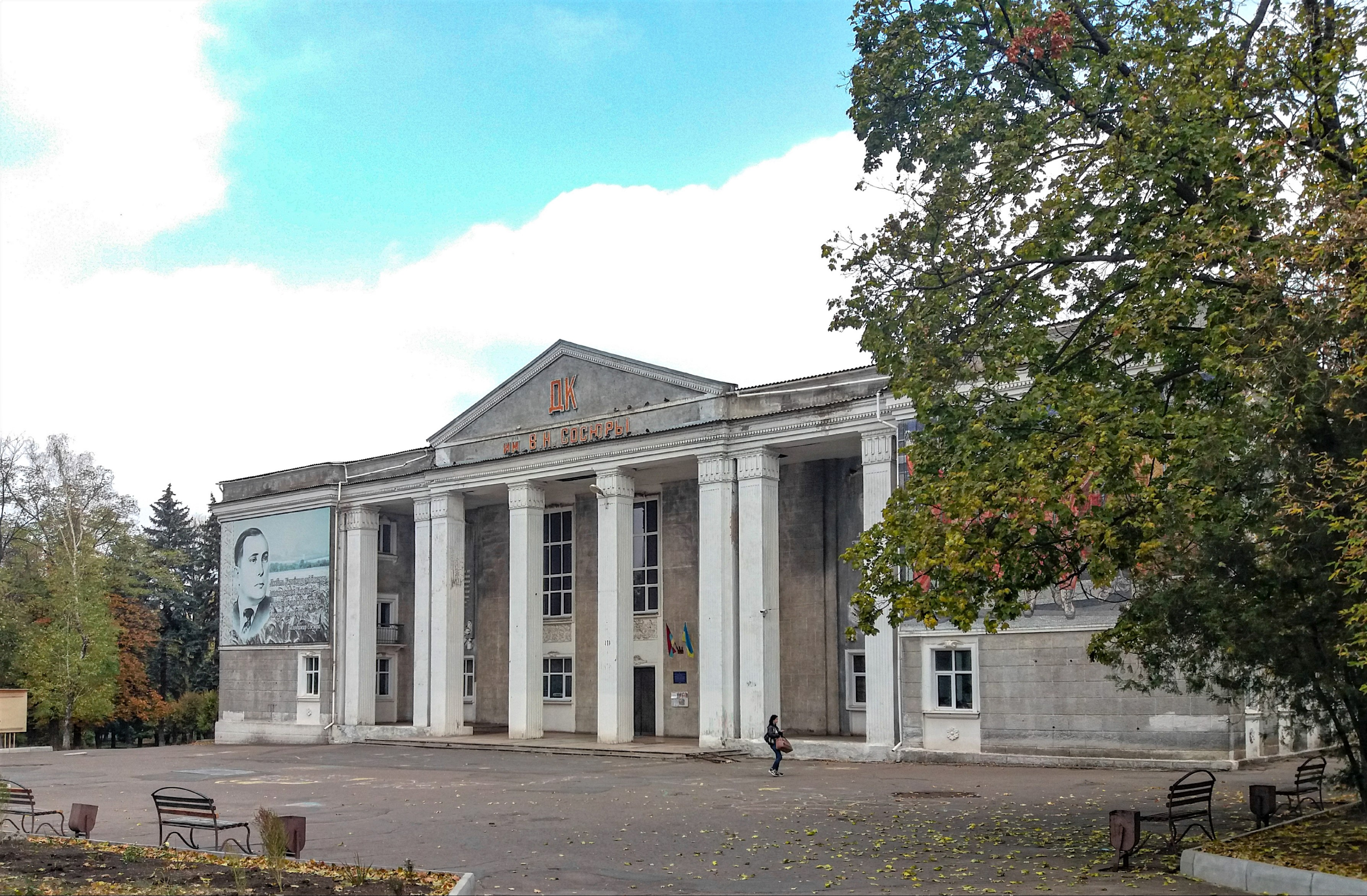
Palace of Culture that hosts the museums dedicated to Volodymyr Sosiura and the Lysychansk Glass Factory.

Lysychansk is host to four museums: the City Museum of Local Lore, the Museum of the History of Mining, and the Museum of V. Sosiura and History of Glass of the Lysychansk Glass Factory (the latter two are housed in the same building in different halls). The city museum was created in 1964, although from 1979 to 1991 it was a department of the Luhansk Regional Museum of Local Lore. It was initially located in the Steiger School before being moved in 1991, and hosts around 12,000 people per year with 19,000 items. It has the following halls: Archeology and Nature of the Native Land, Development of Lysychansk, the Russian Civil War, the life of Sosiura, and the Great Patriotic War.

The mining museum was opened in 1995 at the Steiger School after the city museum was moved. It is notable for being the only museum covering the history of mining in Donbas, and was created on the basis of people from the Lysychansk Mining College and former miners from the city. It is sponsored by the mining company Lysychanskvuhillia and has halls dedicated to how coal was formed, how it was discovered in Lysychansk, and famous miners from Lysychansk. The last two museums, the one dedicated to Sosiura and the Lysychansk Glass Factory, reside now in the Palace of Culture named after Sosiura. The museum of Sosiura has many items of Sosiura's, around 572, and also has regular literary readings and meetings. The museum dedicated to the glass factory has many products of the Lysychansk Glass Factory, around 2,453.

=== Sports ===
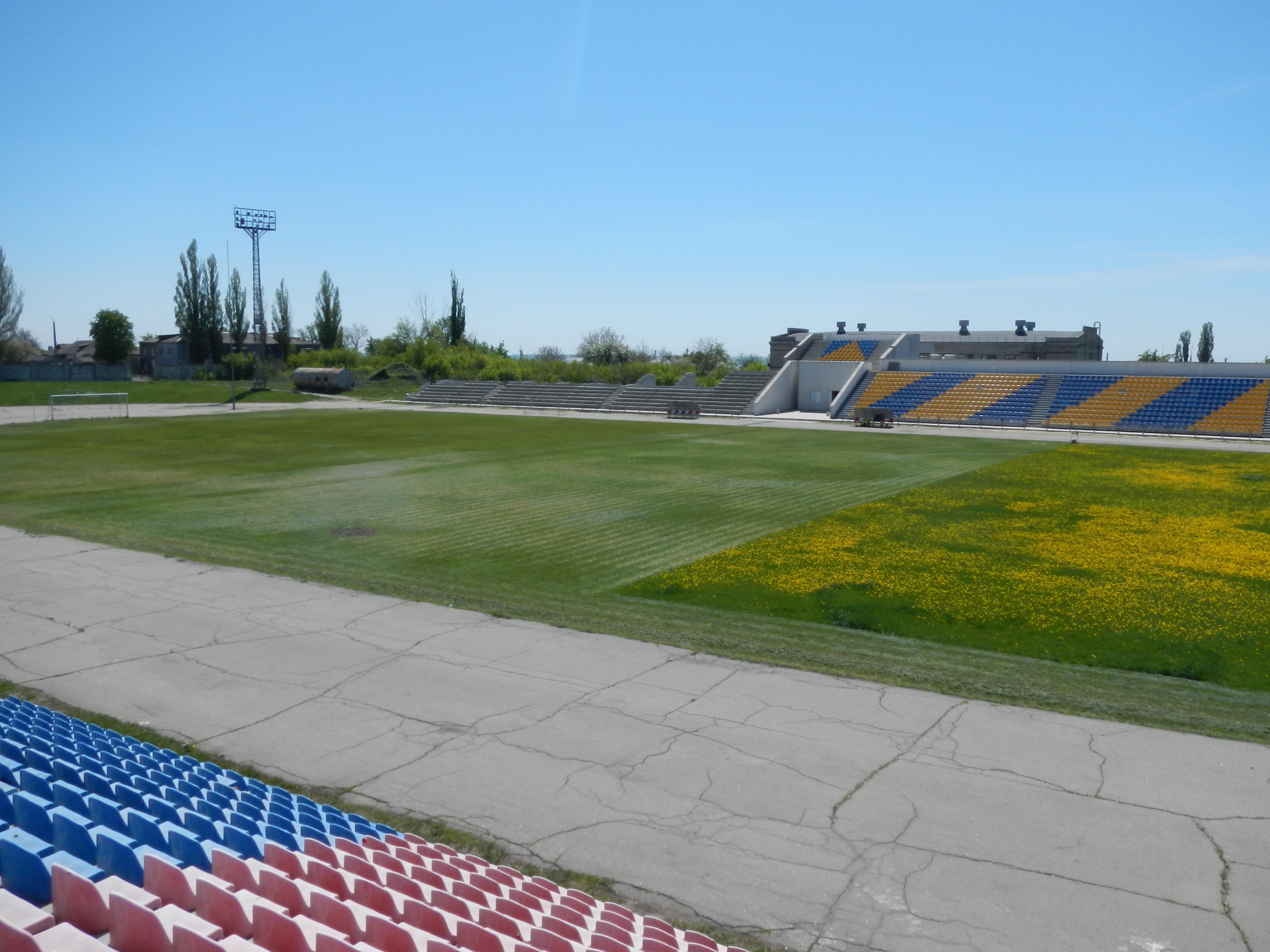
Shaktar Stadium, Lysychansk.

Lysychansk was the home of many association football clubs that have mainly competed within the Luhansk Oblast Football Association. Some of the historical football clubs include "Donsoda", which won the Luhansk Oblast Championship in 1959, "Shaktar" Lysychansk, which also won in 1965, 1969, and 1970, and "Melnikov Mine" Football Club, which won in 2013. The city, historically, had a derby with the villages of Verkhnie and Proletarske, before they were merged into Lysychansk. The most recent football club was FC Budivelnyk, which was founded in 2019 and also competed in the Luhansk Oblast championship, winning once in 2021. It last played in 2022 due to the war. Budivelnyk, since 2022, still has a futsal team that actively plays outside of Lysychansk as part of the Extra-Liga. The team's best performances were back-to-back from 2024–25 to 2025–26, reaching the round of 16 in both championships.

The city's main stadium is Shaktar Stadium, which has housed all the football teams. It also sometimes hosts cultural events, notably holding in 2017 a concert of 30,000 people for the Ukrainian rock band Okean Elzy.

=== City symbols ===
==== Nickname ====
The city is commonly known by its nickname of the "Cradle of the Donbas". The nickname referenced the industrial enterprises in Lysychansk, most notably coal mining, for which it is famous.

==== Coat of arms ====
Coat of Arms of Lysychansk

The original, Soviet-era design of the coat of arms was approved in May 1971, and has a background of blue with a red stripe at the top representing the Ukrainian SSR. The area of Lisya Balka is depicted in green at the bottom and a slag heap above the grass representing the coal industry, with Lysychansk and a hammer and sickle in the red stripe on the top. Lysychansk after independence first considered a coat of arms in August 1992, when it was decreed that an open competition would be held with city funding for competition prizes. The winning artist was Valerii Tokarev of Sievierodonetsk, which the chief city architect Lomako later said was because it best reflected the city's history, and Tokarev's design was used on this basis. The coat of arms was approved on 9 June 1993. It consists of a shield, with the name "Lysychansk" on the top in Ukrainian, with the shield being divided into tricolours. The colours were chosen from the city flag that Tokarev also created. In the middle are a golden fox and coal, representing that both Lysychansk sits on the "Fox's Ravine" and that the first coal in the Donbas was discovered in the city.

In 2024, the Russian-installed authorities entirely redesigned the coat of arms. Under this version, there are horizontal strips of blue, then red, then blue, with a piece of coal on the bottom that a fox sits on. At the top is a golden crown.

==== Flag ====
Flag of Lysychansk

The flag, also designed by Tokarev and approved alongside the coat of arms on 9 June 1993, was the first city flag in Luhansk Oblast after independence to be adopted. It is rectangular and has a 1:2 ratio of width to length, and is divided into three colours, with it being specifically horizontal as to not confuse with the Romanian flag. Half of the top is crimson, then it is a dark blue band, and then a yellow band at the bottom.

== Economy ==
The economy of Lysychansk has historically relied on mining, but during the later Soviet era, the industries of glass manufacturing and chemical activities have become more prominent. Since 2000, the city has been undergoing a major industrial collapse. As of 2020, the major employers still existing were the Lysychansk Gelatin Plant, Lysychansk Brewery, Lysychanskvuhillia, and Sharm garment manufacturing. There were 1,514 enterprises in the city, with an average monthly wage of 8,267 hryvnias.

The Lysychansk Oil Refinery was the leading enterprise in the city prior to its closure. It was Ukraine's second-largest refinery and had a refining capacity of 16 million tonnes per year, and was then sold to the Russian-owned TNK-BP in 2000. It was closed in 2012 due to unprofitability, with Rosneft having it as a reserve afterwards until it was shut down entirely in 2014. Meanwhile, Lysychanskvuhillia, the coal mining enterprise of the city, used to employ 4,697 people across four mines in 2003. After 2014, it was the city's largest employer with 3,600 people employed by the enterprise in 2019. In 2019, it was announced that Ukraine would attempt to divest from coal, and thus shut down most of the mines. Despite the Chornomorka mine's closure that year, the enterprise still existed by 2020. The Proletarii glass factory was the third major employer, being one of the largest glass factories in Ukraine. Other notable enterprises included the Lysychansk Gelatin Plant, the Lysychansk Brewery, which was the fifth-largest in Ukraine, and the former LysSoda plant and rubber components factory.

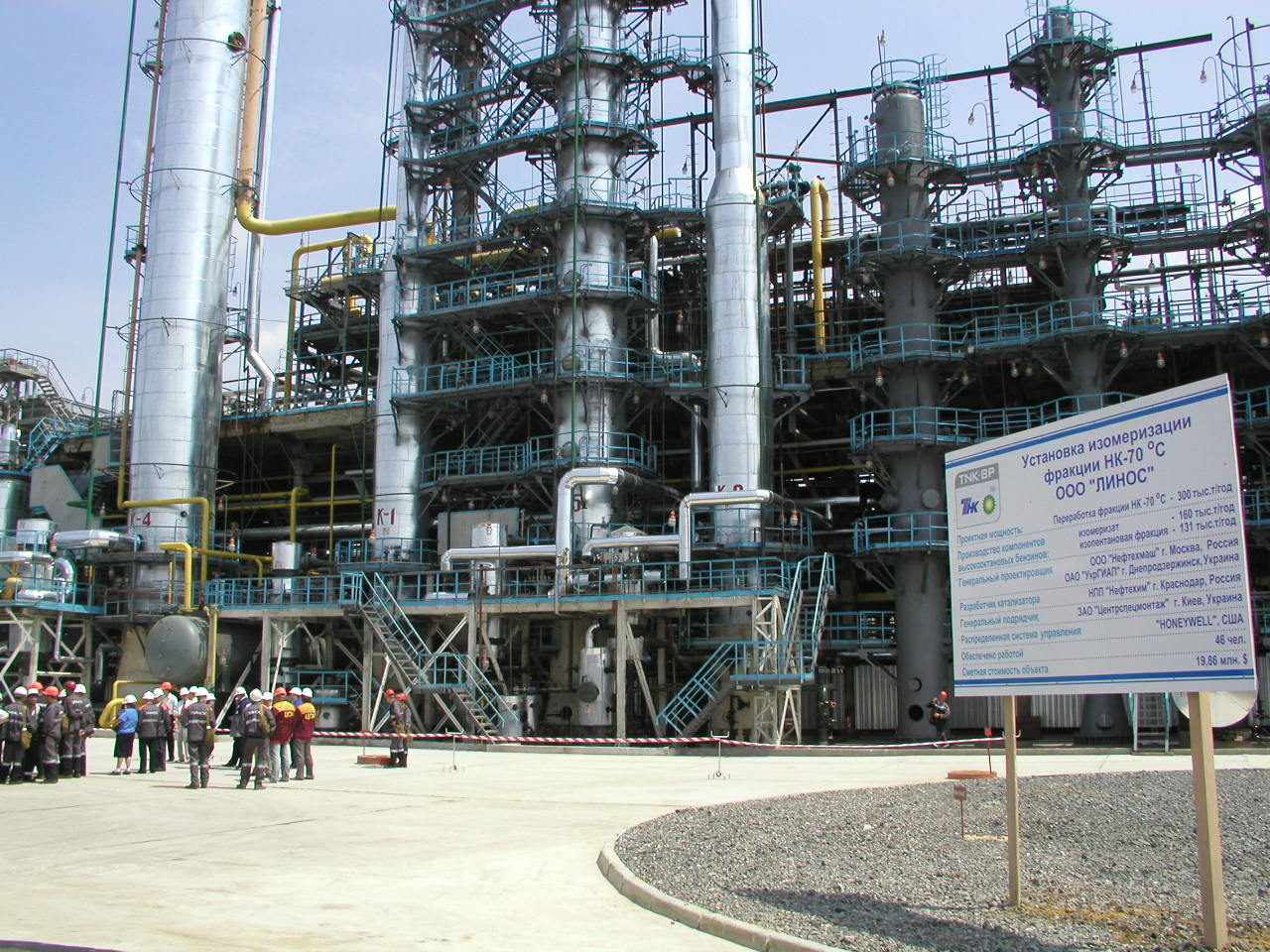
Lysychansk Oil Refinery

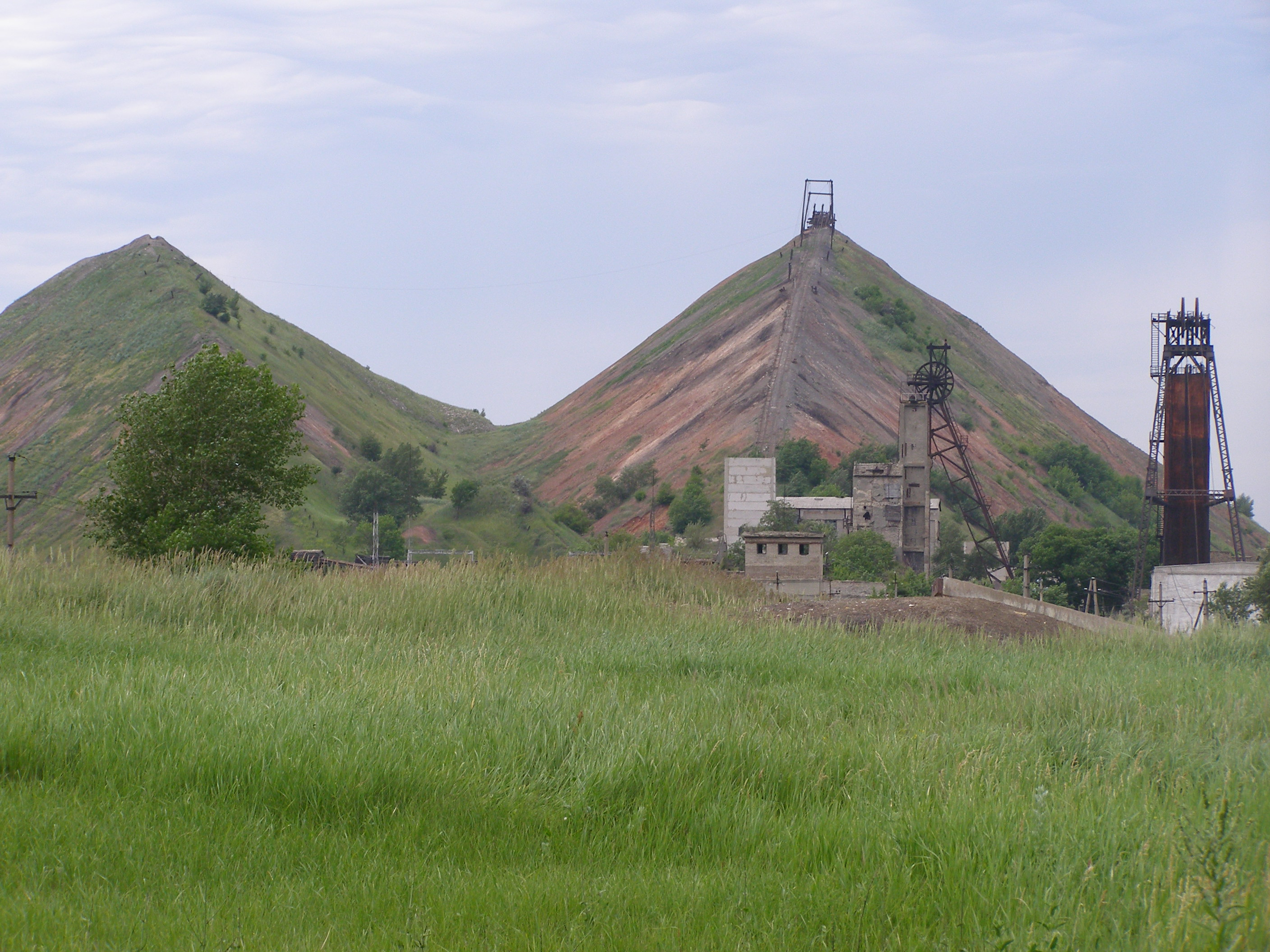
Coal mine

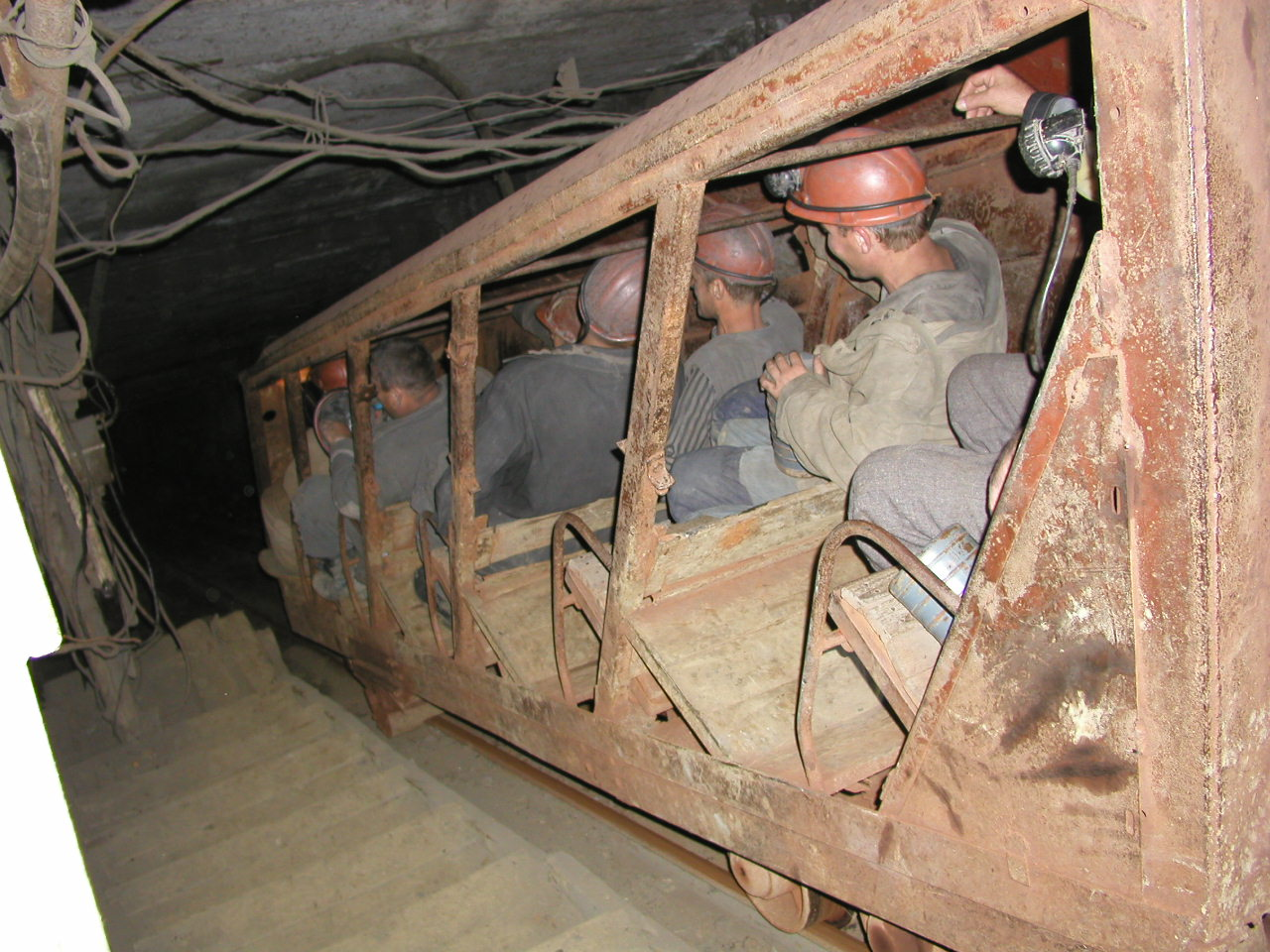
Descent into a mine

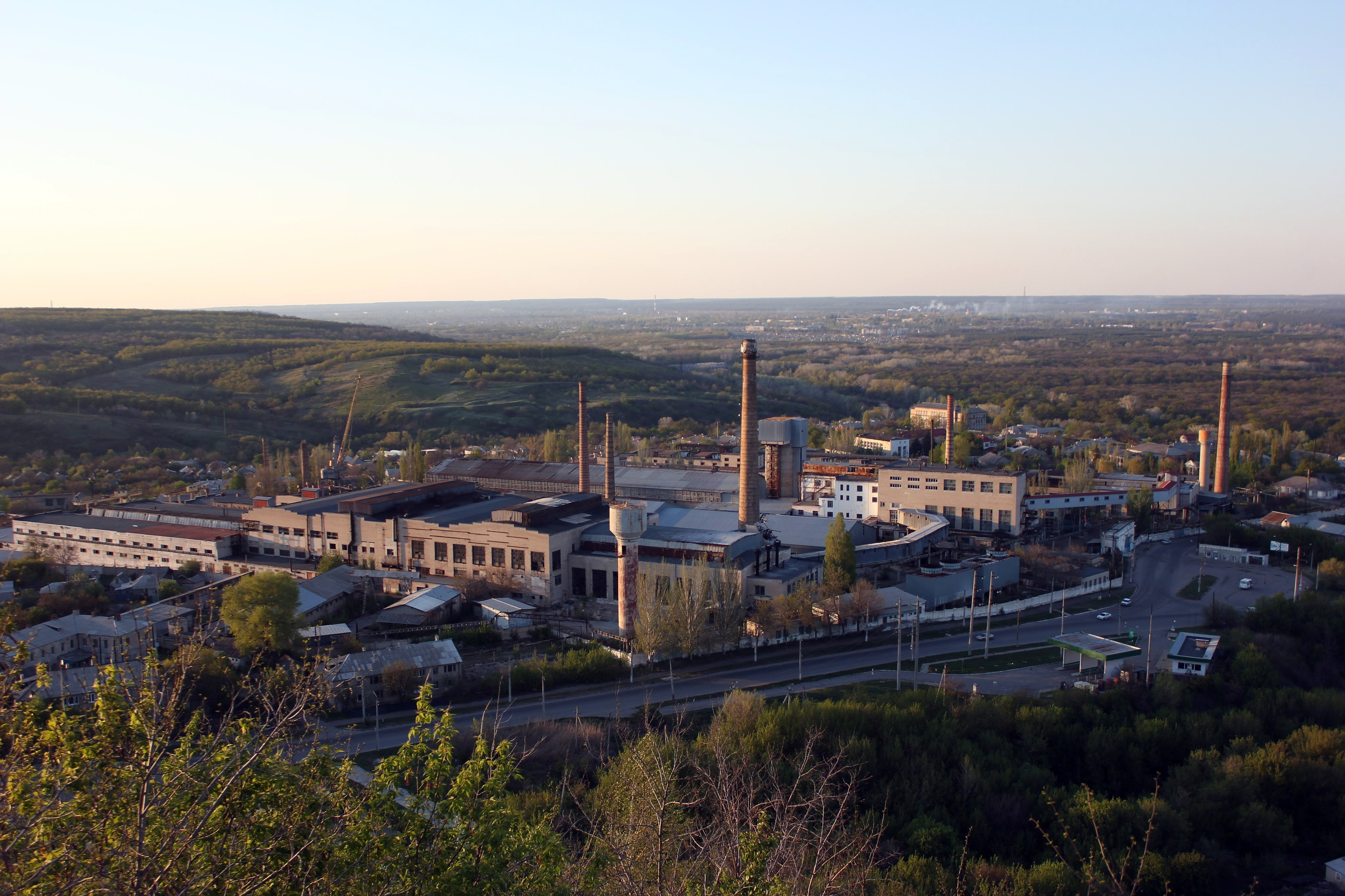
Glass plant

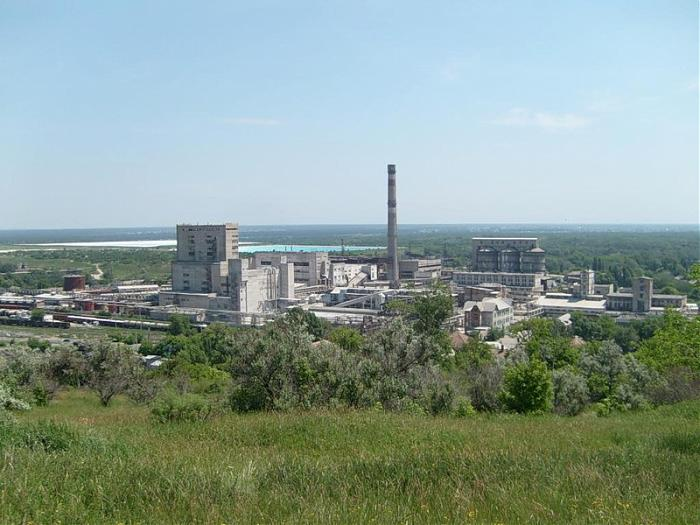
Former soda plant

== Education ==
=== Higher education ===
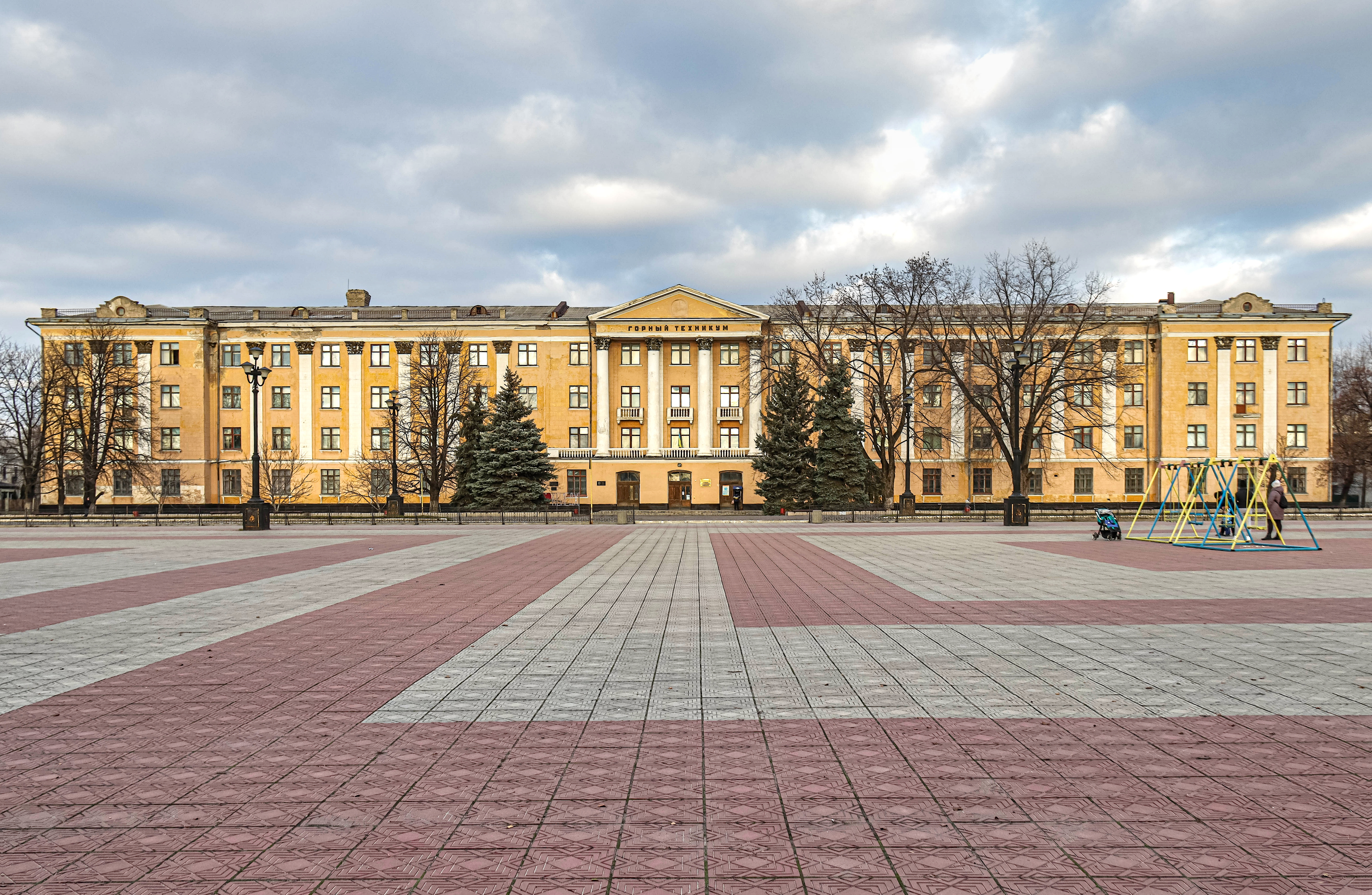
Lysychansk Mining-Industrial Professional College, before its destruction in 2022.

Before the war, Lysychansk had seven institutions of higher education. The original ones include: the Lysychansk Mining-Industrial Professional College, the Lysychansk Pedagogical Professional College, the Lysychansk Medical Professional College, and the Lysychansk Industrial-Technological Professional College. Due to the War in the Donbas in 2014, many of the displaced universities from the rest of Luhansk Oblast were moved to Lysychansk, including the Brianka College, the Kadiivka Pedagogical College, and the Donbas State Technical University, which moved its main office to Lysychansk.

The mining college is the oldest of the city's colleges, and the most well-known. It was founded in 1872 and has since acted as a state-owned university. The original historic building of the university was destroyed by Russian forces in 2022. The pedagogical college is a subdivision of the Luhansk National University, and originally started as a teachers' college in 1938 before broadening. It was moved to the city of Dolyna in 2022. The medical college in the city was founded in 1931 originally as the Lysychansk Medical Tekhnikum, and is currently relocated to Pidhorodne. The last original college, the industrial-technological one, was founded during the Soviet era, originally in Rubizhne before moving to Lysychansk. Due to the war, it now operates in Odesa.

=== Secondary education ===
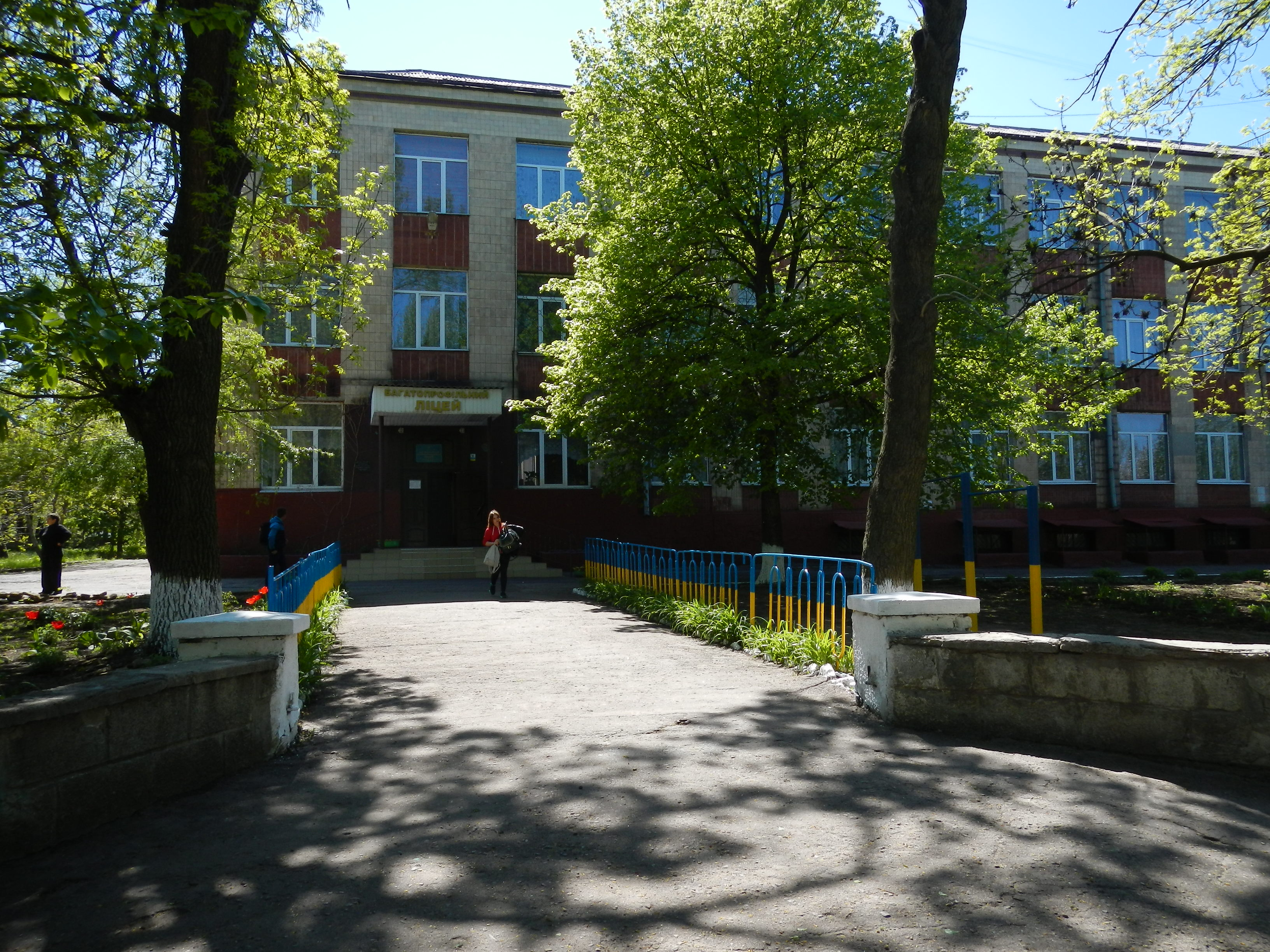
Lysychansk Multidisciplinary Lyceum.

After Ukrainian independence in 1991, there were 19 secondary schools in the city. Soon after, two more preparatory-specific schools were opened, a lyceum and a gymnasium. According to the last update of the Ministry of Education in 2021, there are the following numbered gymnasiums: 2, 3, 9, 18, 24, 25, 26, and 29. There are the following numbered lyceums also: 1, 4, 5, 6, 7, 8, 12, 13, 14, 17, 27, 28, and 30. The specialised schools are Vovchoyariv Gymnasium and Myrnnodolynskyi Lyceum.

Most of the secondary school education before 2022 was in the Russian language, with only one fully Ukrainian language school within Lysychansk existing in 2011 called Gymnasium No. 3. That year, it was under threat of closing down due to understaffing, although after a collective letter to the city executive committee, the authorities said a special commission would be created to debate the closing. The school stayed open, as evidenced by it being included in the Department of Education's list.

=== Public libraries ===
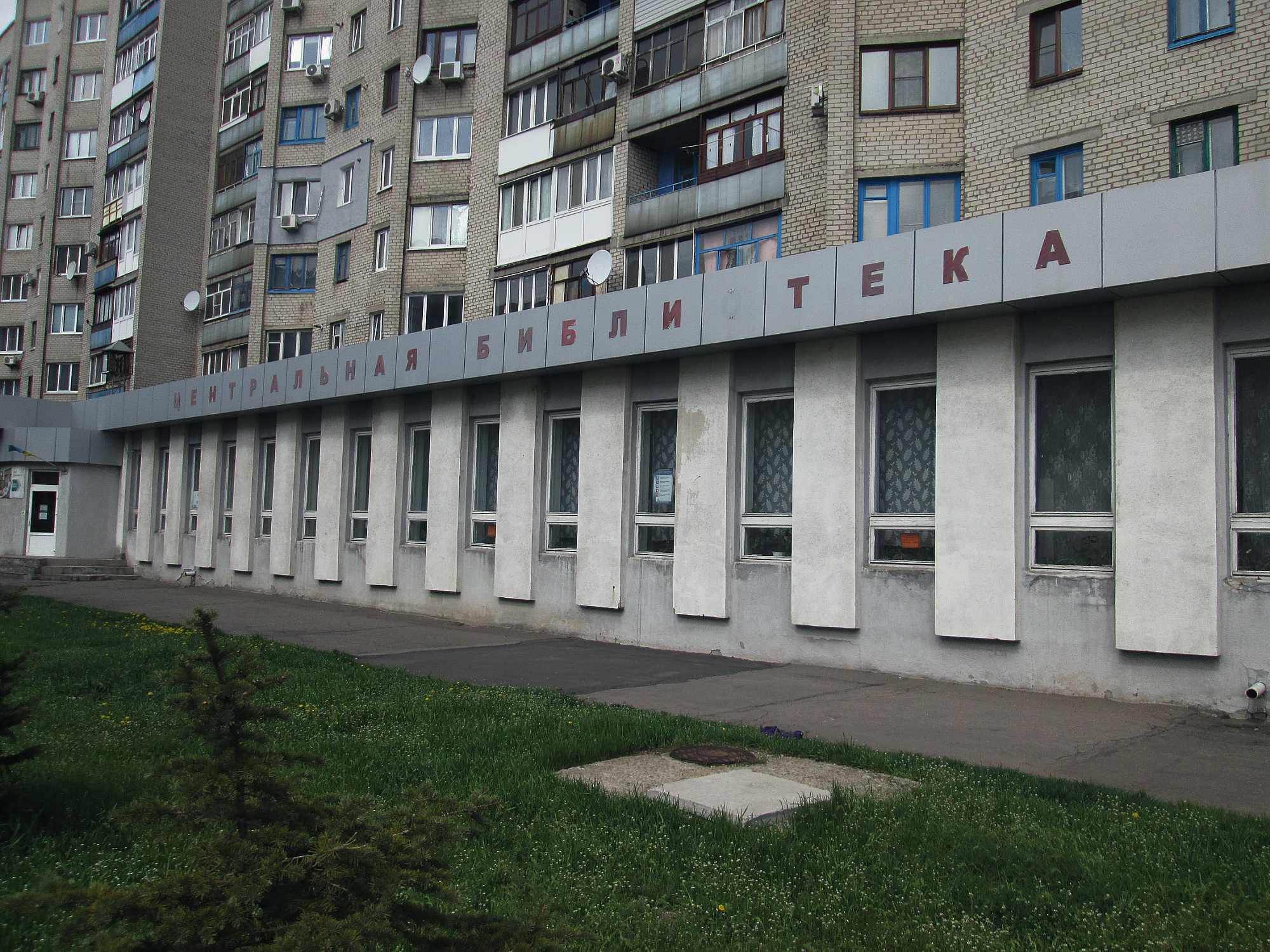
Central Library of Lysychansk.

The city is served by the Lysychansk Public Library System, which comprises 15 libraries within the city and 2 more branches in surrounding villages (Bila Hora and Zolotarivka).

The city library was created in the 1920-30s with nine different library branches. However, they were all destroyed by World War II, until being reopened after efforts in October 1943. By 1964, the restored central library was serving 6,7000 readers and had 55,000 books. On 1 July 1980, it was decided to centralise the libraries into a single system of 10 libraries with 277,939 items. By 2002, after Ukrainian independence, the library surged, having nearly 30,000 registered users and 435,000 works. As of 2019, the central library also offers computer literacy courses for elderly people, job searches, and hosts a film club on documentaries on human rights.

== Infrastructure ==
=== Transportation ===
==== Local transportation ====
===== Trolleybuses =====
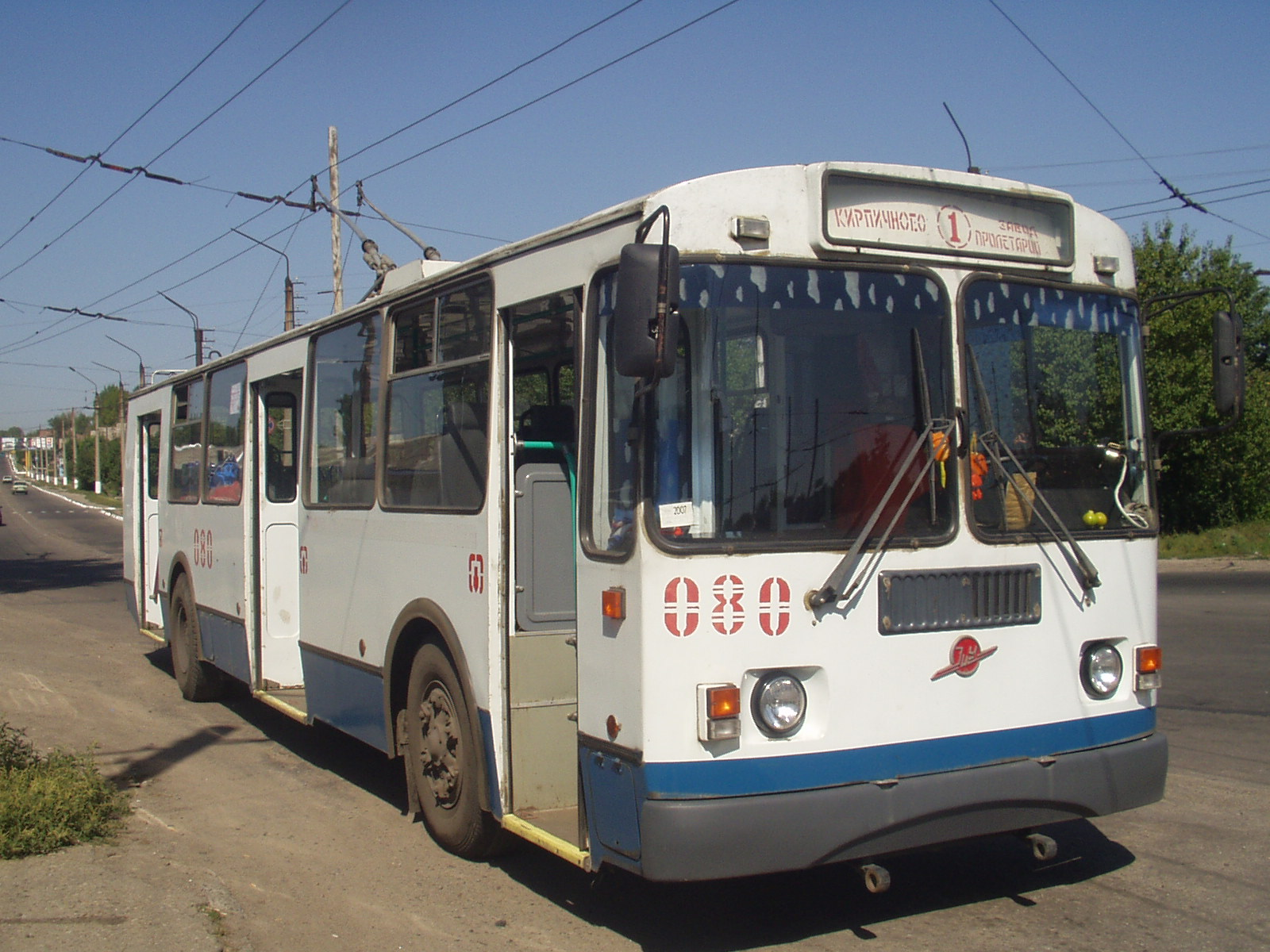
Trolleybus in Lysychansk.

As of 2007, the fleet had 12 vehicles, of which 8 were built prior to Ukrainian independence (4 ZiU-682 from 1989 and four more ZiU-682 from 1990). Two were YMZ-T2's built in 1997, and the most recent at that time was two more ZiU-682s from 2006. In total, at the time, there were four routes. However, as the trolleybus started to decline in service, by the mid-2010s only a single route was still running. After the war, Elektroavtotrans director Vitaliy Kucherenko said only five trolleybuses could run at once, although they had a total of six, since shelling had damaged a section of the route and some parts were also stolen during the conflict.

In May 2017, due to the rise in minimum wage and the cancellation of a tariff and declining passenger numbers, the executive committee of Lysychansk decided to increase the fare to 2.50 hryvnias. After this, Elektroavtotrans came into repeated conflict with the regional electricity supplier for Luhansk Oblast, LEO, over unpaid bills. The first time was in March 2018 due to a debt of over a million hryvnias, and power was again cut later that year in August since the company still had a debt of around 900,000 hryvnias to LEO. After this incident, Lysychansk officials agreed to give 1 million hryvnias to pay off the debt owed by Elektroavtotrans. After the debt was paid off, by November 2019, only a single trolleybus remained still running in service. It still only ran one route, which is 3 kilometres through the city. Service was again temporarily suspended during COVID-19, and in a local survey it was noted that many residents wanted the trolleybus to resume afterwards because of its free option for pensioners. After the return, the fare became 4 hryvnias. In December 2021, a new interurban route was finally laid that connected Sievierodonetsk to the Lysychansk Railway Station.

After the start of the Russian invasion of Ukraine, on 25 February 2022, all trolleybus traffic was stopped indefinitely, just two weeks prior to what would be the trolleybus system's 50th anniversary of service. The remaining infanstructure was destroyed during the war.

====== Former routes ======
The following is a list of routes, prior to the war shutting all down:

- Route No. 1: Kirpichnoye to Proletariy plant (ran until 2022)

===== City buses =====
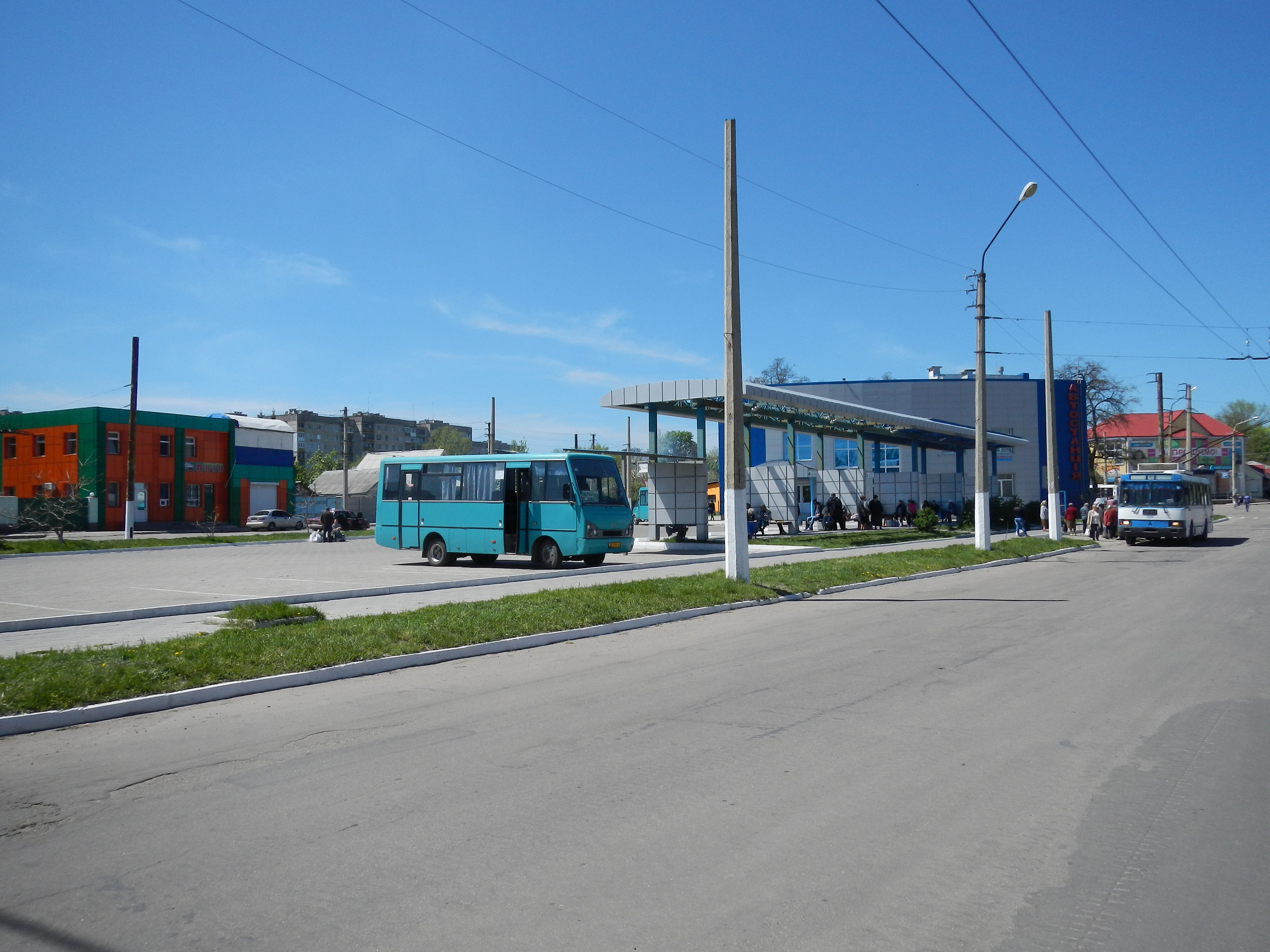
AvtoVAZ buses in Lysychansk.

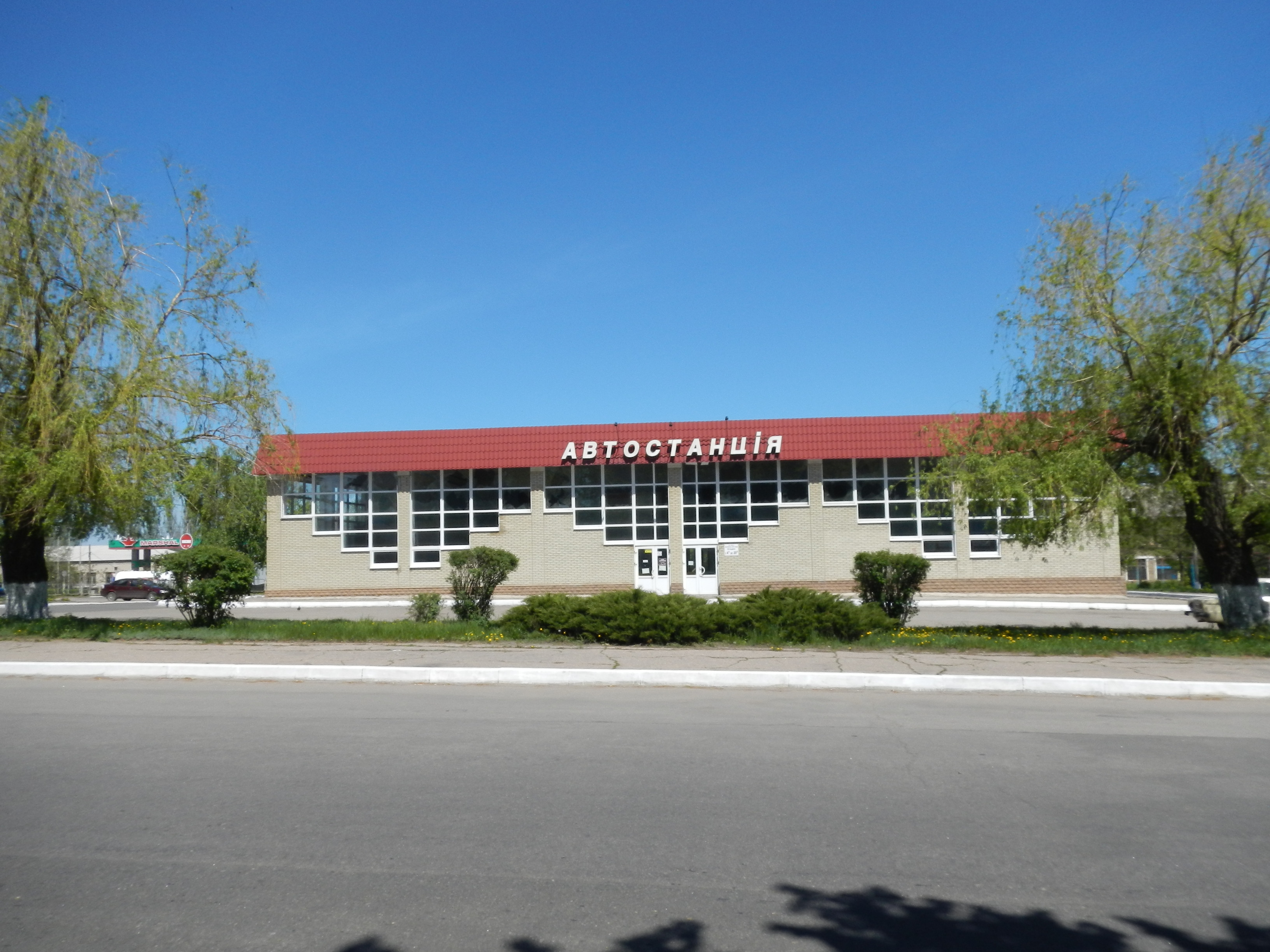
Bus station.

City buses and Marshrutkas are among the most common forms of transport in the city, and run both regular suburban routes and intercity routes. As of 2021, marshrutkas are available on Route No. 112, Route No. 115, and Route No. 117. The rest are city buses operated by Elektroavtotrans. Most of the buses running in and out of the city start running after 6 am. until 7–9 pm. for different routes. Direct regular bus service is available to other Ukrainian cities, including Donetsk, Kharkiv, Berdiansk, and Mariupol. However, according to residents, the marshrutka service has serious problems, including very long queues and frequent fighting and disputes among people on the buses.

In 2018, one of the most important intercity marshrutka routes for Lysychansk to Sievierodonetsk was restored because it was impossible to use most bridges due to the war. The buses running to the twin city were 8-seat minibuses. During 2019, many new marshrutka routes were introduced, including Route No. 110 and Route No. 113. A year later it was announced that with funding from Germany, free social-transport buses would connect Ustynivka and Bila Hora, both more rural villages, to Lysychansk. The same fare would remain for many years until 2021, when all fares on buses and marshrutky were raised by 1 hryvnia, which was well received by these carriers because of the increased fuel costs. In March 2022, during the war, lots of the buses were used as evacuation buses, although multiple times they came under fire by Russian troops and mines were found along the routes. In May 2022, the Head of Luhansk Oblast, Serhiy Haidai, urged citizens in Lysychansk to evacuate via these buses as Russian forces drew nearer.

====== Former routes ======
The following is a list of routes, prior to the war:

- Route No. 101: Central Market to Chornomorka (operated by Elektroavtotrans)
- Route No. 102-a: Ring from Central Market to Microdistrict No. 41 to Vul. K. Marx to Vul. Im. V. Sosiru back to Central Market (Elektroavtotrans)
- Route No. 102-b: Ring from Central market to Microdistrict No. 41 to Vul. K. Marx to Prosp. Peremohy back to Central Market (operated by Luxavto-SDK)
- Route No. 105: Ring around Central Market (Elektroavtotrans)
- Route No. 106: Central Market to Berezove village (Elektroavtotrans)
- Route No. 107: Ring from Central Market to Dibrivka (Luxavto-SDK)
- Route No. 108: Ring from Central Market to RMZ to Central Market. Also sometimes Central Market to Lysychansk Railway station (operated by FOP Cherniikov V.F.)
- Route No. 109-a: Central market to HTV Plant (Luxavto-SDK)
- Route No. 109-m: Central Market to HTV Plant on minibus (Luxavto-SDK)
- Route No. 110: Lysychansk Railway Station to Hospital settlement (Luxavto-SDK)
- Route No. 111: Central Market to Proletariy plant
- Route No. 112-m: Central market to Sklozavod Glass Factory (Luxavto-SDK)
- Route No. 113: Lysychansk Railway Station to Proletariy Plant back to Lysychansk Railway Station (Elektroavtotrans)
- Route No. 114: Sklozavod Glass Factory to HTV Plant (Luxavto-SDK, sometimes PE "Avtoalyans")
- Route No. 115-a: Central market to HTV Plant via Polyova (Luxavto-SDK)
- Route No. 115-m: Central Market to HTV Plant via Polyova, minibus variant (Luxavto-SDK)
- Route No. 116: HTV Plant to Proletariy Plant via both Polyova and Hospital settlement (Luxavto-SDK)
- Route No. 191: Central Market to HTV Plant via Sklozavod Glass Factory (Luxavto-SDK)

==== Proposed tram ====
Although a tram system has never actually been implemented, it has been proposed multiple times. The late 1920s were the first attempt with a narrow-gauge tram, but it was abandoned because of possible landslides. A second proposal occurred in 1932 to envision a "Greater Lysychansk" linking the city entirely by tram, and in June, the Lysychansk City Committee petitioned the government to begin construction of a tram line. However, the project collapsed because it was decided to move the chemical combine and settlement for workers to the left side of the Donets, which rendered a possible tram moot. The last time the topic seriously resurfaced was in 1938 and 1959 to connect Verkhnie and Proletarsk. These were passed up in favour of the trolleybus, which started in 1972.

==== Railways ====
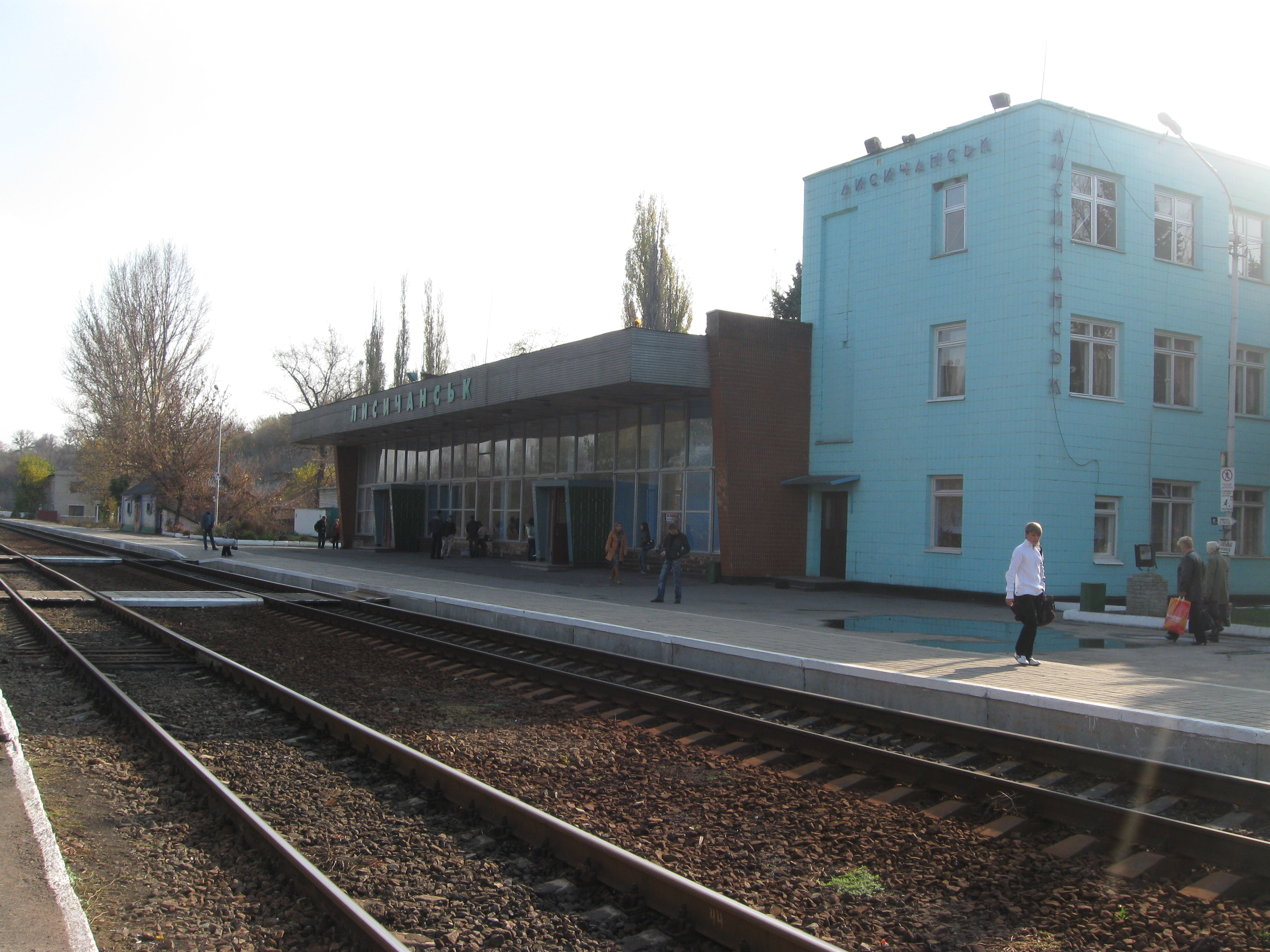
Main railway station

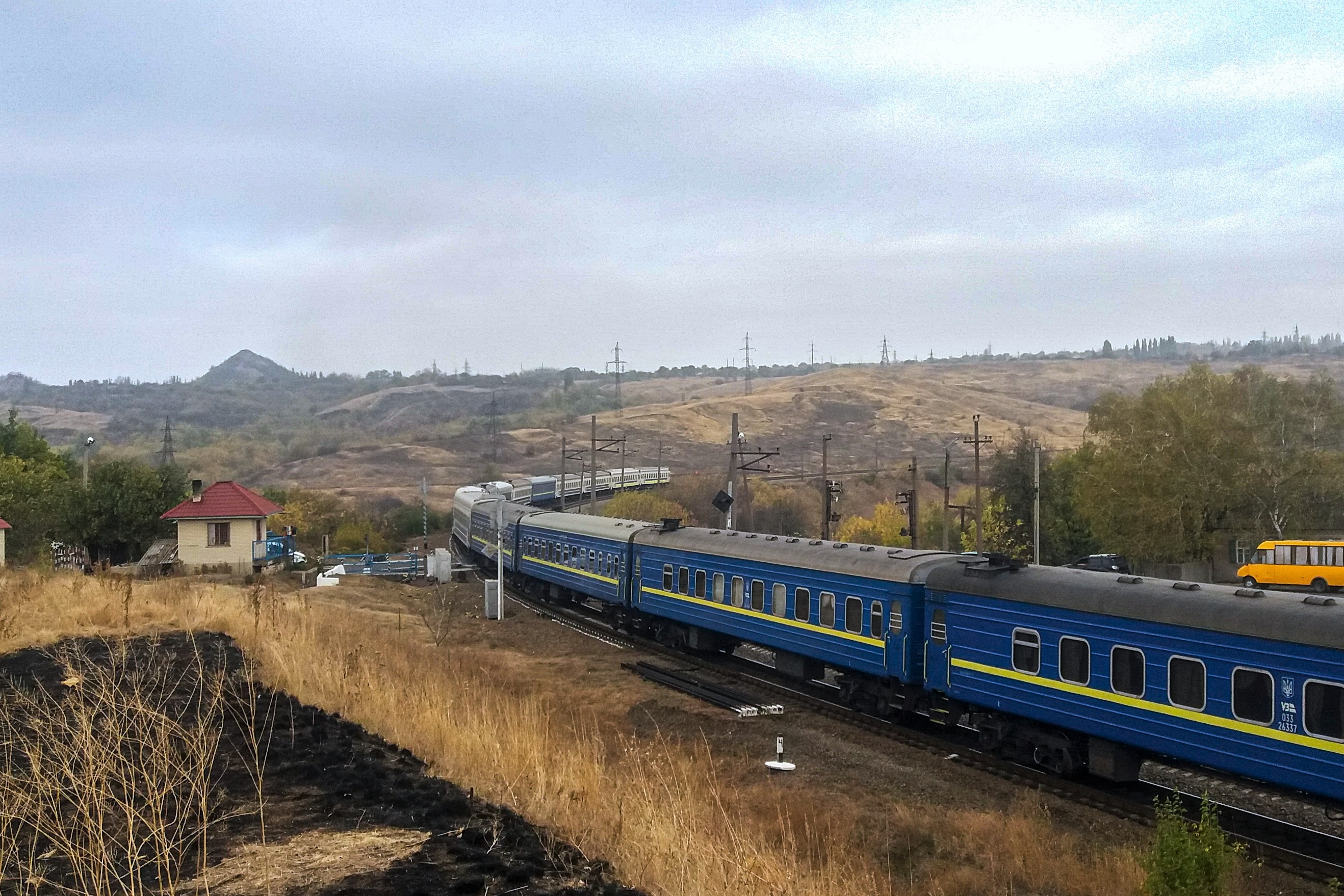
Train in Lysychansk, en route from Kyiv to Popasna.

Lysychansk has a central railway station and three other railway stations: Nasvitevych, Pereizna, Volcheiarska. Almost all transit distance trains stop at Stations Pereizna and Volcheiarska, allowing residents of Southern Lysychansk not to be dependent on the central railway station (not actual from 2014). As of 2021, the non-central stations are only used for short-destination interurban trains (diesel commuter trains). Lysychansk Central Railway Station has the following train routes. All routes are served via Donetsk Railways. The following is a list of routes from January 2022, prior to the war:

- 19/20 – Kyiv – Popasna
- 45/46 – Lysychansk – Uzhhorod
- 89/90 – Lysychansk – Odesa
- 131/132 – Lysychansk – Zhmerynka
- 137/138 – Lysychansk – Khmelnytskyi
- 887/888 – Popasna – Kharkiv

Lysychansk, after most of its train routes were shut down in 2014 during the war, received a rapid revitalisation of its routes in the late 2010s. The first of these was to Khmelnytskyi in October 2016 on Train No. 234; however, this was temporarily stopped in December 2017 when Ukrzaliznytsia removed both of the routes from Lysychansk to Kyiv and Kharkiv. The company said it was due to low ridership; however, it caused outrage by officials within Luhansk Oblast, such as Yuriy Klymenko, who considered both routes essential, such as Kharkiv, which was used by both displaced people and people returning from the ATO. In 2018, to address these concerns, a new night express train was launched back to Kyiv, and later that year the Kharkiv route was brought back to this time run all the way to Dnipro. Two years later, the Train No. 20 route was changed from Lysychansk being the final destination to Popasna.

In the last two years before the war, there were also attempts at developing the track. This started in March 2021 when modernisation was started on the track between Siversk and Lysychansk, in order to cut down the time connecting Lysychansk to Sloviansk and Lysychansk to Kyiv. It was also proposed that this would help with jobs for Sivrsk residents, since previously the only way to reach Lysychansk was via intercity bus. In April, Donets Railway launched a new suburban route from Lysychansk to Kupiansk, and then in June a route to Odesa on odd-numbered days. The last development was in January 2022, just before the war, when it was heavily discussed about using a European Investment Bank loan to electrify the rail segment between Siversk and Lysychansk. Since the Russo-Ukrainian war, no routes run from Lysychansk, regardless of whether it is to Ukraine or Russia. In most cases, Lysychansk Central Railway Station became the final destination for long-destination trains.

==== Air transport ====
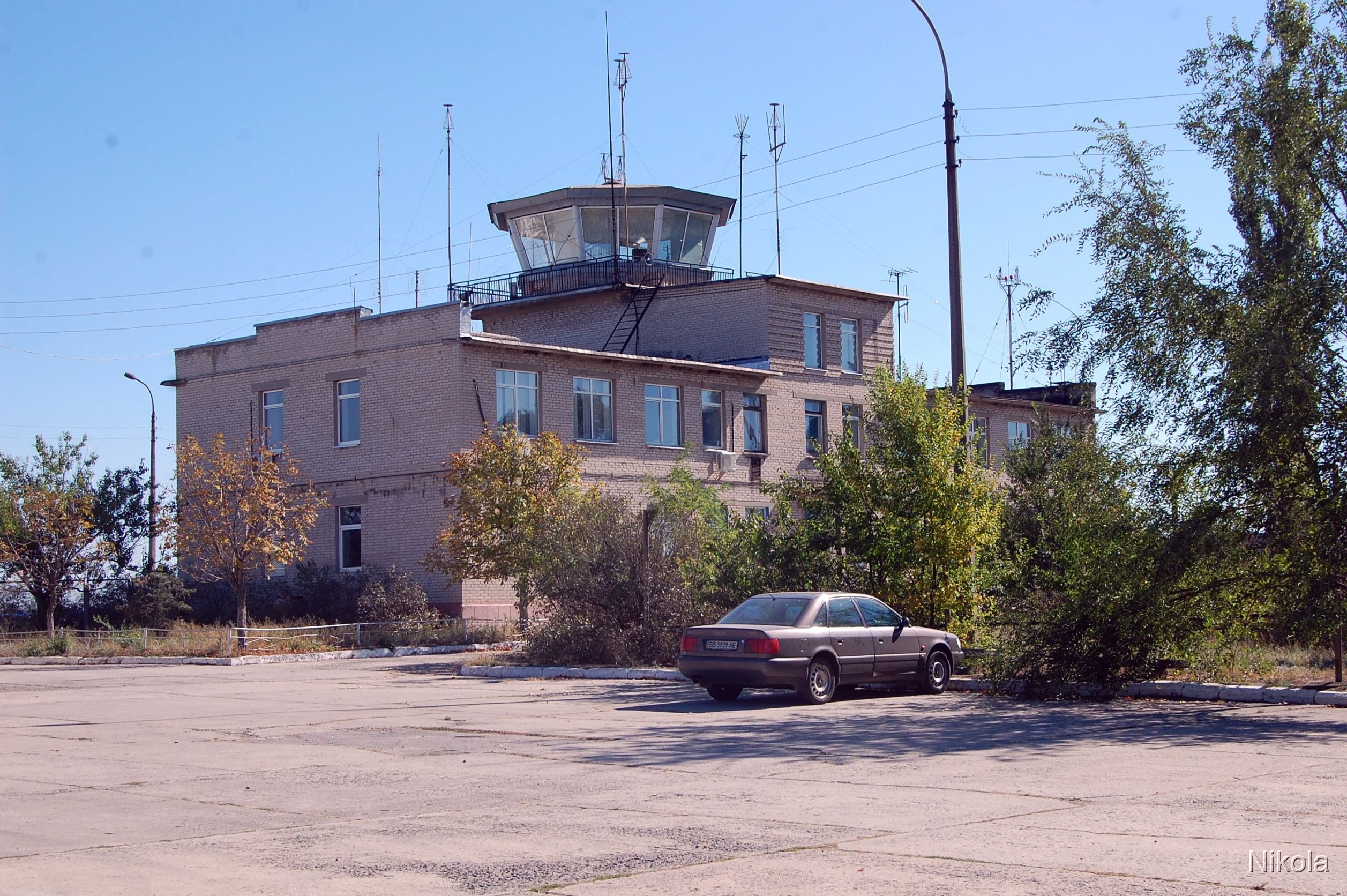
Sievierodonetsk Airport

The nearest airport is located 12 kilometers from the city center, located in Sievierodonetsk and called Sievierodonetsk Airport. Built in 1968, the airport is to serve residents and workers of the surrounding cities. The airport is administered by the Lysychansk District pipeline OAO UkrTransNafta. Due to the War in the Donbas, the airport was partially destroyed and did not have the necessary machinery, requiring two billion hryvnias for restoration. The liquidation of the airport has been repeatedly postponed, this time to 2027.

==== Roads and bridges ====
The European route European route intersects through the city. It was also formerly a site as an intersection of the Ukrainian international high way, M04, which connected Znamianka to the border with Russia. However, in April 2020, M04 was decommissioned and merged with M12 to form the new M30 route. When it was part of M04, it was a two-lane highway that connected to Izvaryne. The other roads that pass through the city are the national highway H21 and the regional highway P66. In terms of the T-network, the territorial route, it was also formerly connected to T 1302 which ran to Bakhmut.

==== Cable car ====
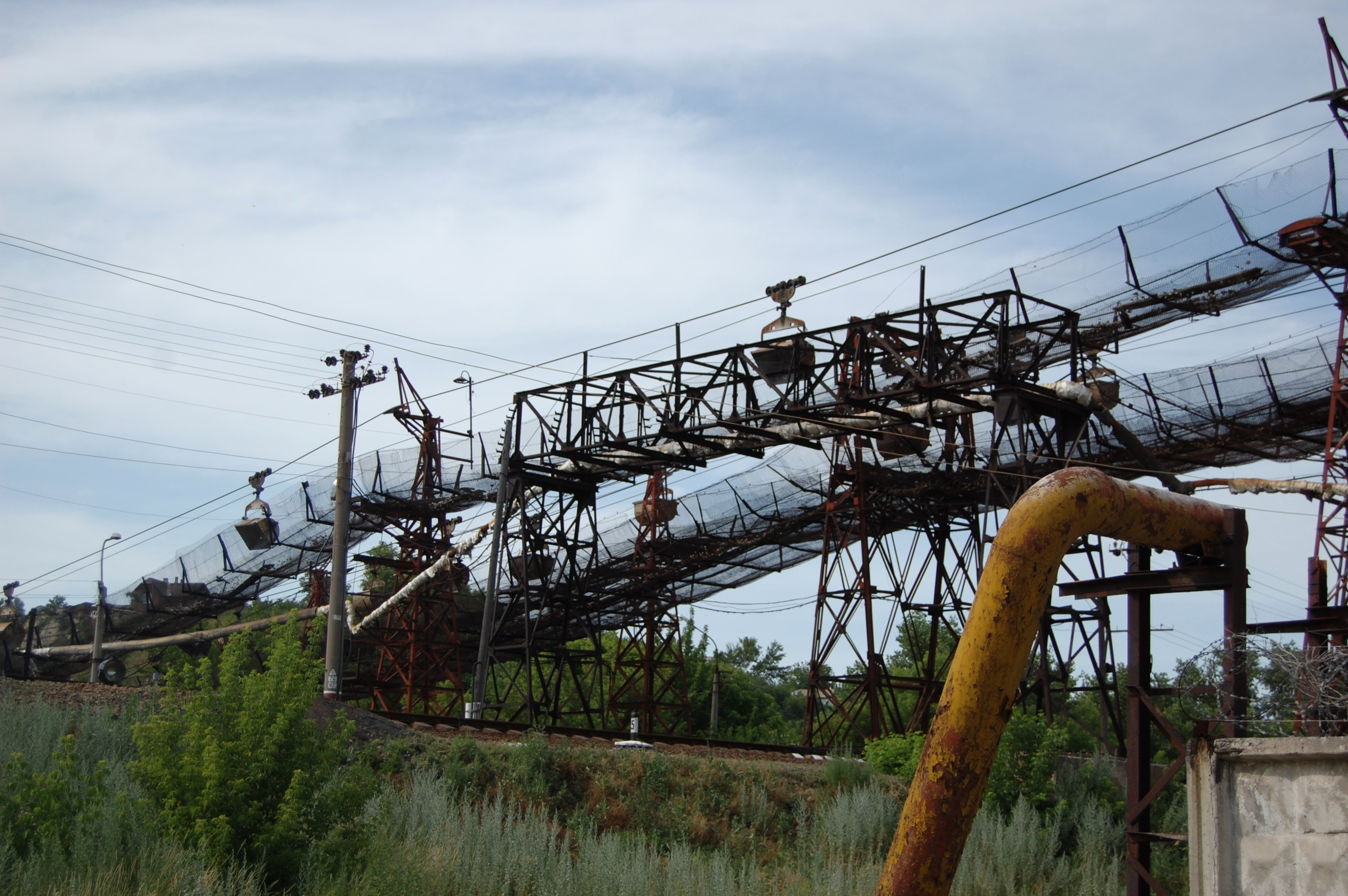
Cable car in Lysychansk

Lysychansk used to be home to the longest cable car network in Ukraine, which was also one of the largest in Europe. It was one of four in Ukraine, alongside the one in Kharkiv, Yalta, and Ai-Petri. It linked the quarry in nearby Bilohorivka to the historic soda plant in Lysychansk. The first cable car in the city was constructed in the early 20th century, by at least 1906–07, but the main cable car railway that would be constructed was done in 1954. The railway built in 1954 measured 16.5 km, with cars moving at 9 km per hour, with two different sections joined together. It also ran through residential areas, which required safety netting. In 2010, the soda plant was shut down, which led in May 2013 for the cableway being largely dismantled. In September 2013, demolition was largely completed; however, some of the 100 metres of cable left were left to dangle. This was fixed by February 2020, when it was noted that no trace of the former cableway remained.

=== Energy ===
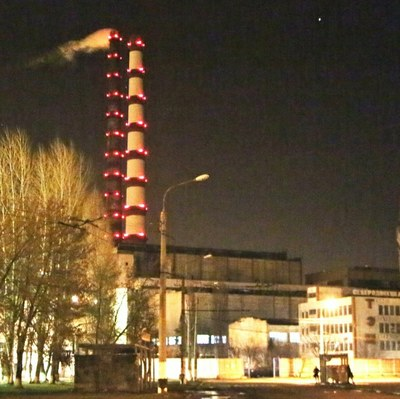
Sievierodonetsk Thermal Power Station prior to the war.

Lysychansk was formerly served by a 220 kV substation called "Lysychanska", which was part of Ukrenergo. The closest major thermal power station is in Lysychansk's twin city, Sievierodonetsk, after the closure of Lysychansk's thermal power plant in 2012.

There have also long been various major plans for power in Lysychansk, mostly due to the coal output. In 1916, this started under Ugletok, who proposed building a regional power station in the city. In 1920, after the Soviets took over, the initial GOELRO plan was to also build such a station to be one of the core stations in the Donbas. However, the large station was never built. The Soviets decided to eventually do away with the idea of making smaller substations instead. Thus, the Lysychansk Thermal Power Station was opened up in 1930–31, and fully completed in 1932. In 2011, around 90% of the thermal energy was used for LysSoda, with the rest for residential heating. However, after 2011, it was announced that the city committee would set aside 30 million hryvnias to eliminate the TPP being used for residential purposes, and instead, residential housing would have mini-boilers. It was part of Donbasenergo, until it was liquidated on orders of the Ministry of Energy on 17 February 2012. After the Russian invasion of Ukraine, the energy infrastructure across the triangle of cities (Lysychansk, Sievierodonetsk, and Rubizhne) was severely damaged. It was reported that by June from Energoatom that the Sievierodonetsk TPP had been almost completely destroyed.

=== Water and sanitation ===
Lysychanskvodokanal (Ukrainian: Лисичанськводоканал) provides water services to Lysychansk.

In recent years, Lysychanskvodokanal has been notorious for its unpaid electricity debts, which have led to water disruptions many times. The first time was in July 2019 when a pumping station was turned off by LEO due to unpaid bills, cutting off access to 13,000 people. The State Emergency Service in response trucked in water to residents every day during the crisis, with water being restored by the end of the week. Later that year, in October three more pumping stations were turned off, leaving over 80,000 residents without water. This was classified as a state-level emergency, leading an emergency commission to contact the President of Ukraine, Zelenskyy. Lysychanskvodokanal received a million hryvnias grant from the city council to address these issues. However, the Russian invasion of Ukraine again disrupted the water supply severely, and all water supply was lost at least until the war ends.

== Notable people ==
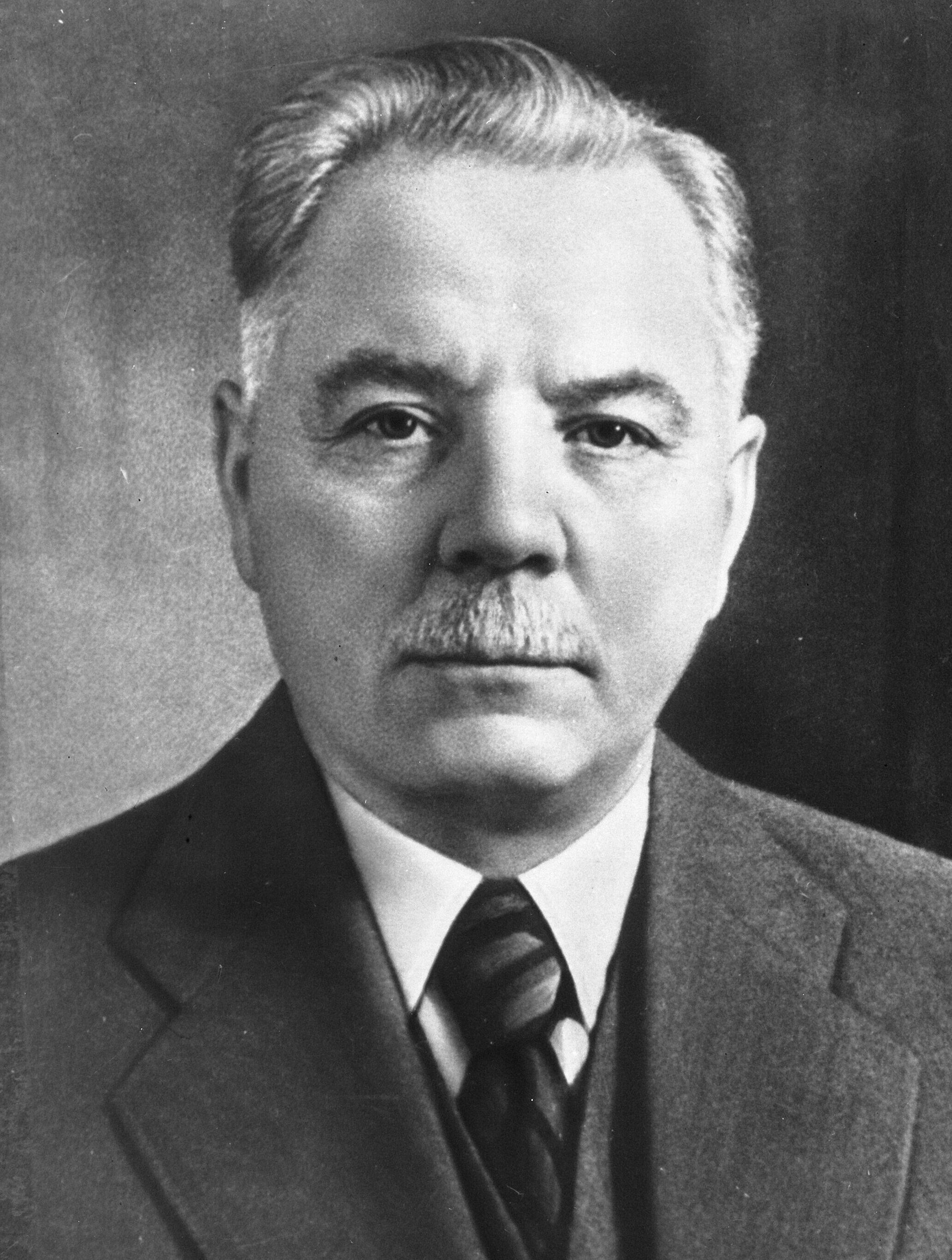
Kliment Voroshilov, who was born in Verkhnie (now Lysychansk), was a Marshal of the Soviet Union.

- Fedir Abramov (1904–1982), Ukrainian geologist and mining specialist
- Nikolai Chuzhikov (1938–2022), Olympic canoeist
- Dmytro Lalyenkov (born 1966) Ukrainian theater and film actor
- Sergey Piskunov (born 1989), Ukrainian hyperrealism painter
- Igor Sergeyev (1938–2006), Minister of Defense of Russia and Marshal of the Russian Federation
- Volodymyr Sosiura (1898–1965), Ukrainian lyric poet and writer
- Kliment Voroshilov (1881–1969), Marshal of the Soviet Union and Chairman of the Presidium of the Supreme Soviet

== Gallery ==
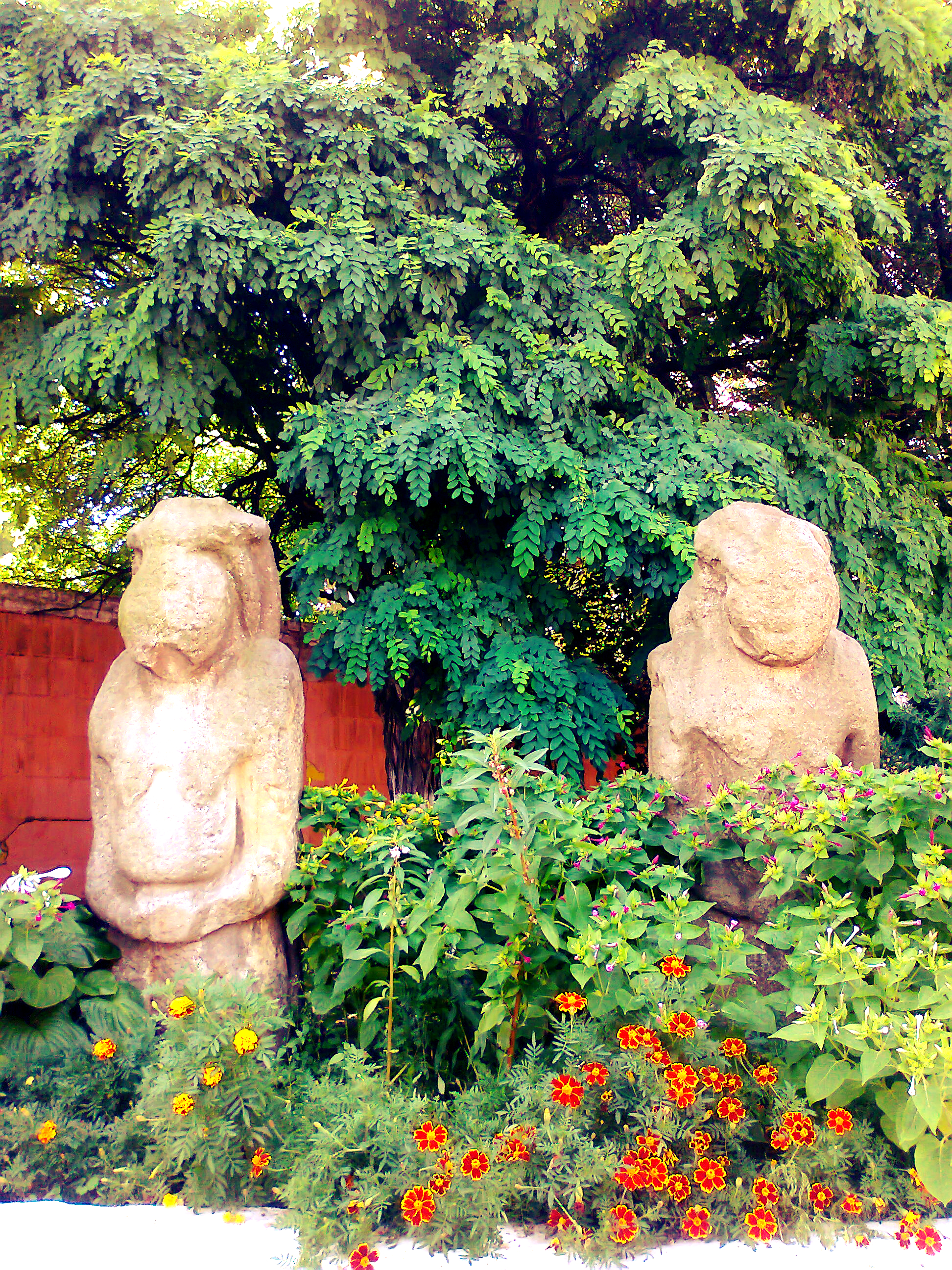
Polovtsian women

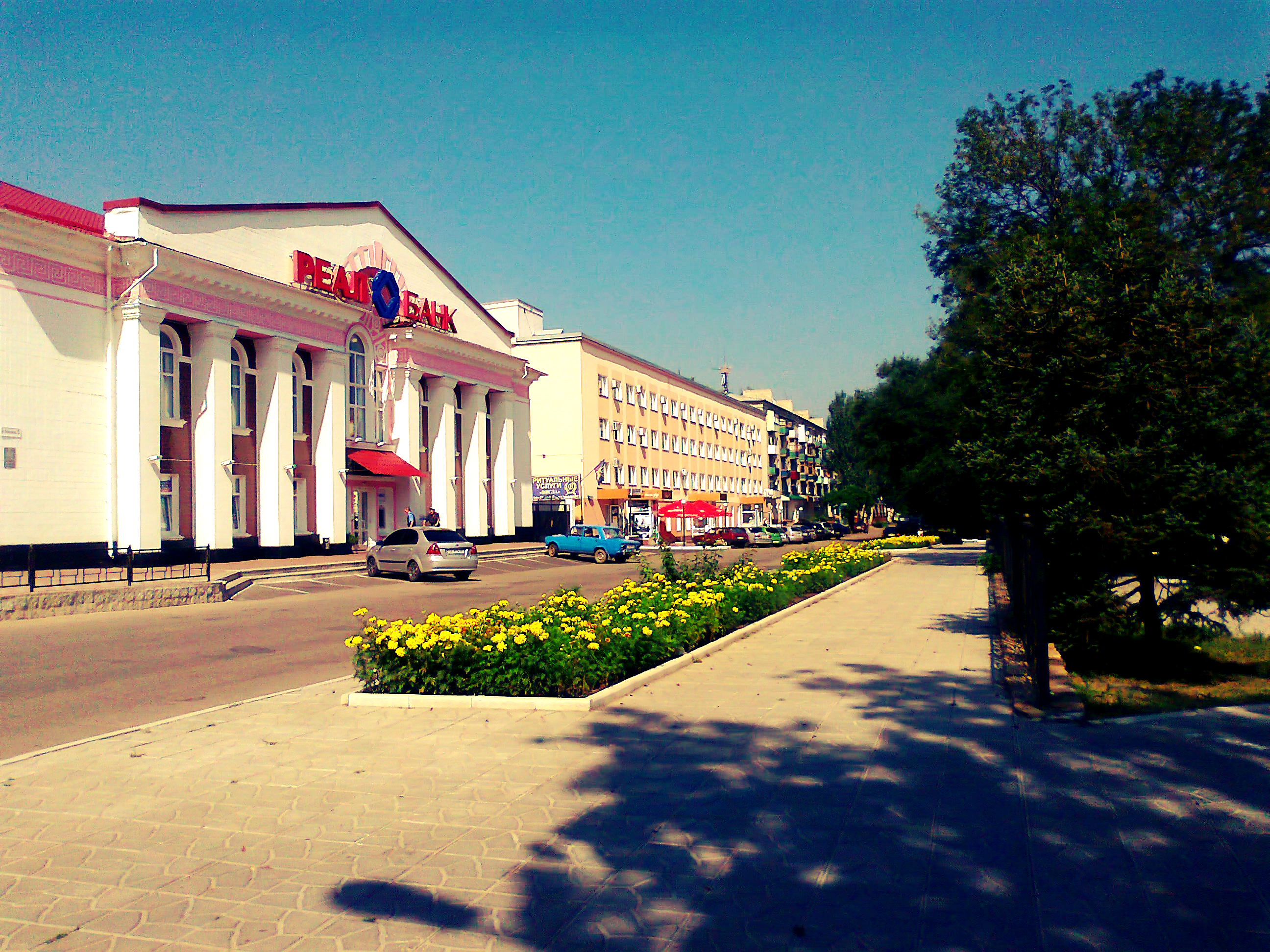
Dovzhenka Street

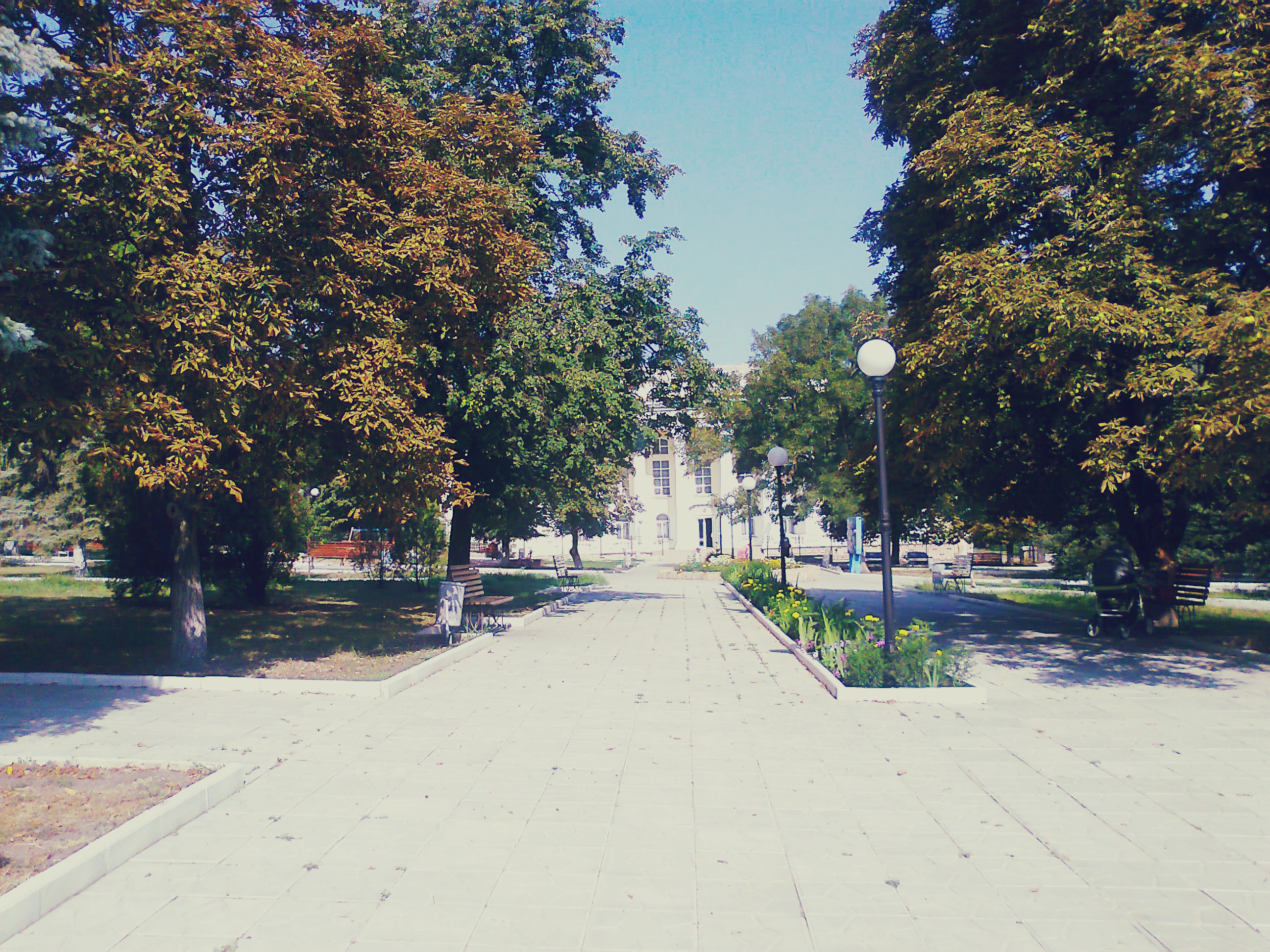
Park

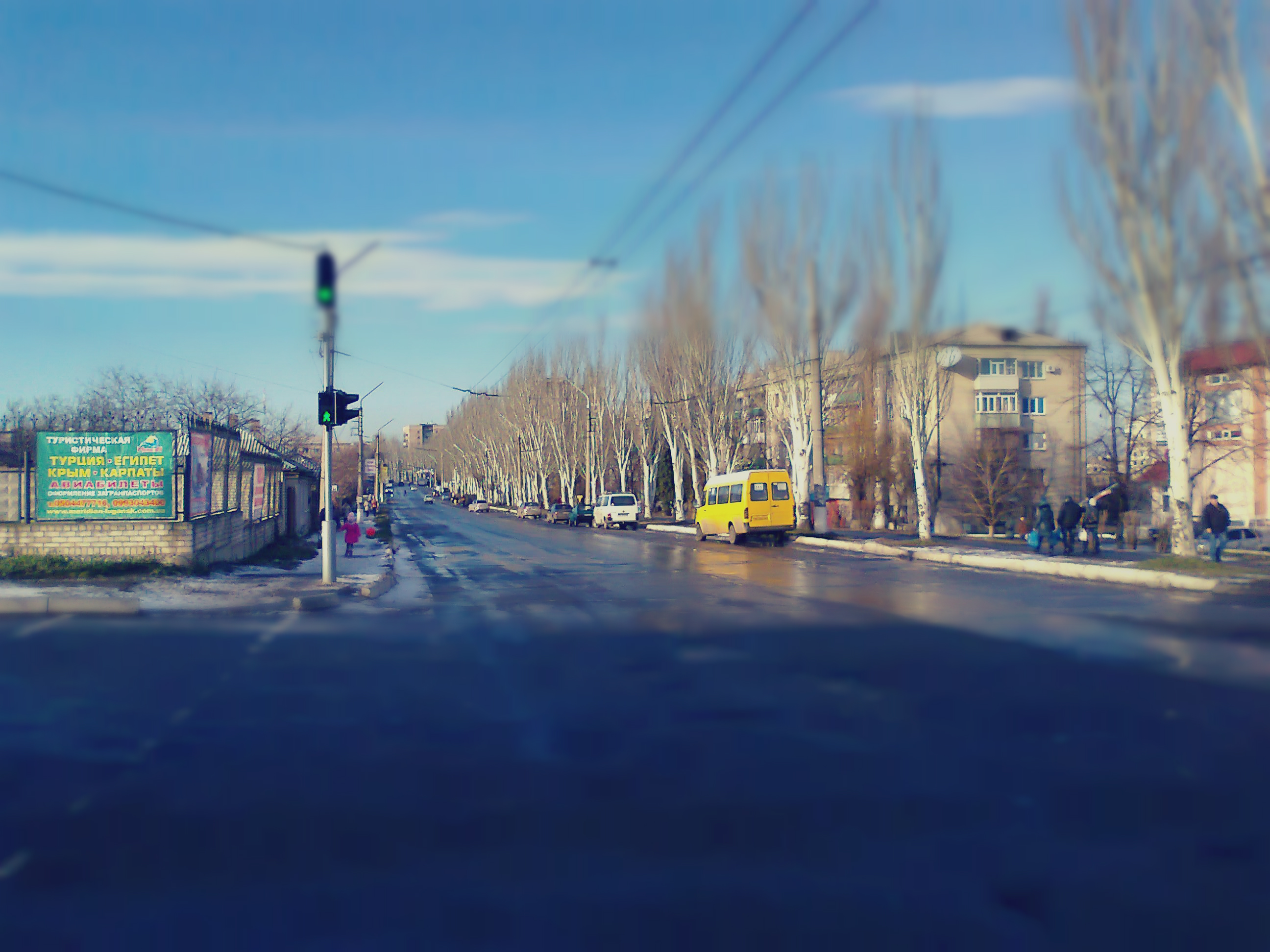
Sosiury Street

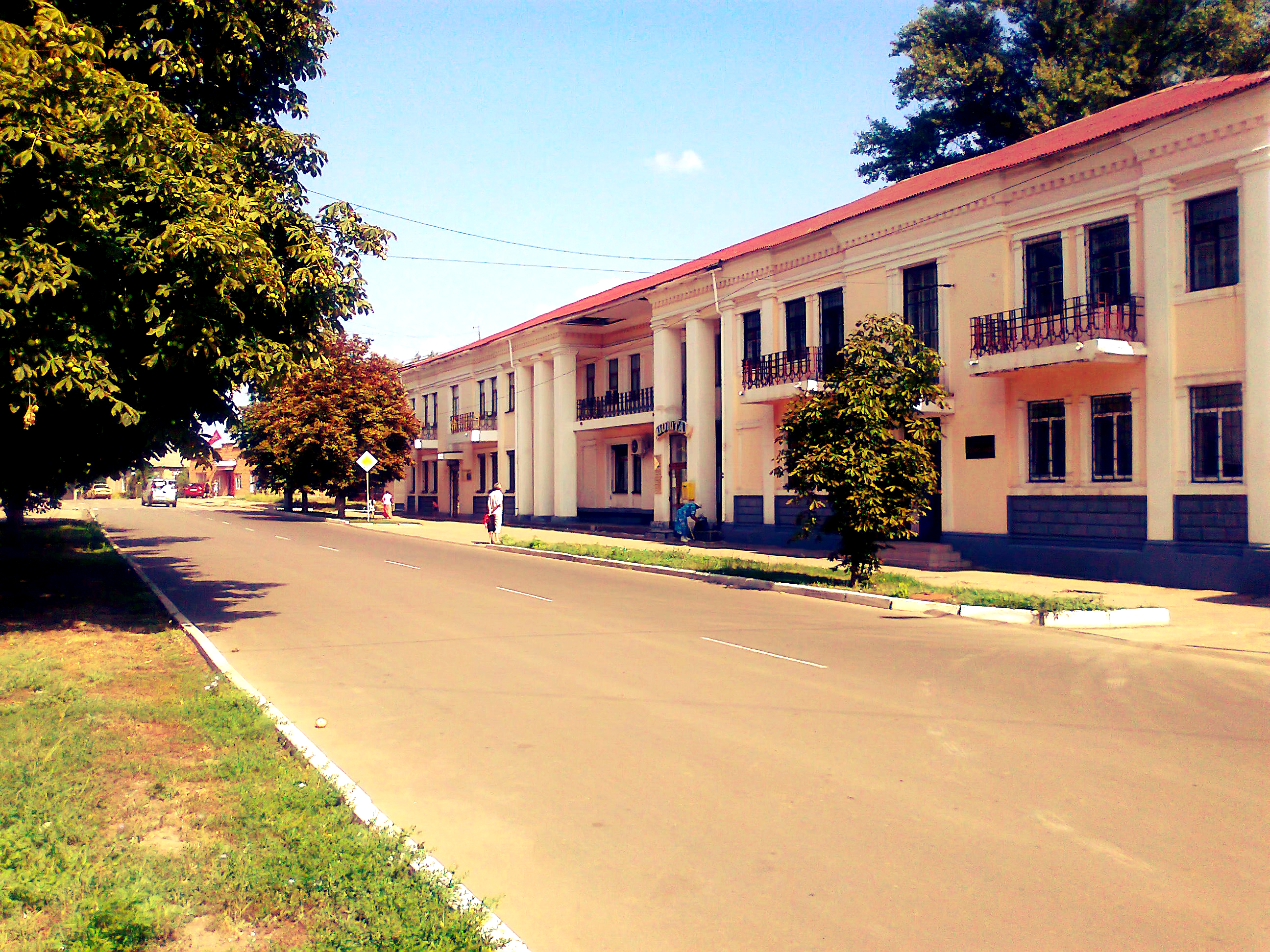
Hrushevsky Street

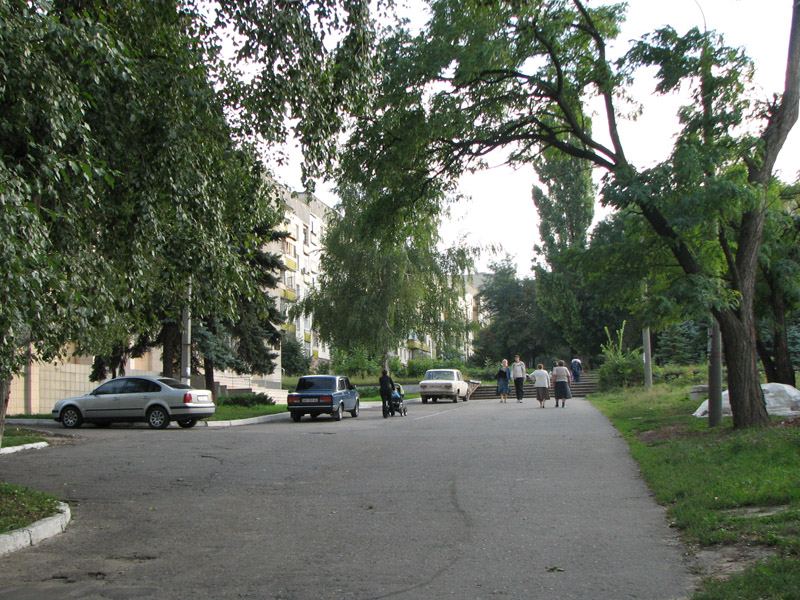
Next to the SBU building

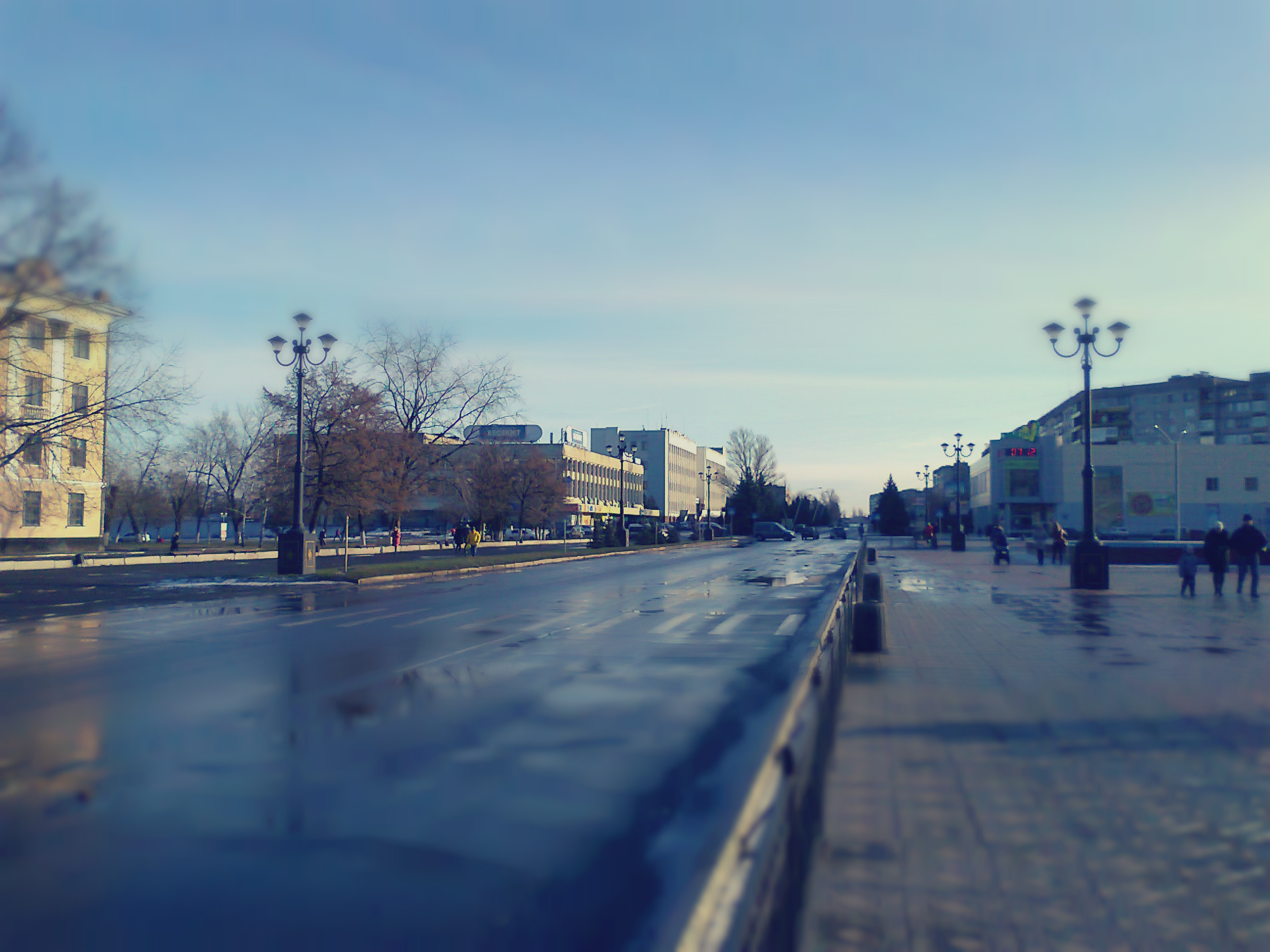
Peremohy Avenue

== Sources ==
- Лопатин, H.B. (1960). У колыбели Донбасса. Луганское областное издательство.
- Šiška J. Donbass v 2014: Kroniki neobjavlennoi voiny. Kemi: Atrain&Nord, 2024. 351 s
