= Mykola Udyansky =

- Микола Удянський
- Born: May 22, 1983 (age 43); Kharkiv, Ukraine
- Citizenship: Ukraine, Russia
- Occupations: Entrepreneur, Honorary Consul of Romania

Mykola Udyansky (born May 22, 1983, Kharkiv) is the Honorary Consul of Romania in Kharkiv, and businessman. He was accused of fraudulent activities within his crypto-projects, including circumventing the National Bank of Ukraine’s restrictions via peer-to-peer transfers. Udianskyi is also listed in the famous Myrotvorets database which lists person whose actions have signs of crimes against the national security of Ukraine and the international law.

== Biography ==
In 2009, he graduated from the Kharkiv National Automobile and Highway University. In 2019, he graduated from Kharkiv National University of Internal Affairs with degrees in Law and Cybersecurity. In December 2019, he sold his stake in Coinsbit cryptocurrency exchange. In March 2023, Udyansky became the Honorary Consul of Romania in Kharkiv.

Part of the proceeds from the sale of 50% of Coinsbit were invested by Mykola Udyansky in real estate. In 2021, Udyansky was included in Forbes Ukraine's list of the 100 richest Ukrainians, ranking 59th with a net worth of $180 million.

Journalists have published documents suggesting that Mykola Udyansky held Russian citizenship until at least June 2023, confirmed by the Main Directorate for Migration Affairs of the Russian Federation.

== Criticism ==
At the N Crypto Awards 2024, Udyansky admitted attempting to circumvent the restrictions of the National Bank of Ukraine through peer-to-peer (p2p) transfers on his cryptocurrency exchange, Qmall.

Former head of the Luhansk Regional State Administration, Georgiy Tuka, shared a photo of Udyansky with Leonid Mitrov, the leader of the "Zalyutynski" gang who was arrested by French police and Ukrainian law enforcement in July 2024 for involvement in kidnappings, torture, and thefts in Ukraine and France.

=== Myrotvorets Database ===
In November 2024, Mykola Udyansky was added to the Myrotvorets database for allegedly holding Russian citizenship, ties to the "Akhmat" club of Ramzan Kadyrov, and involvement in money laundering through the blockchain platform WeWay and the Bitcoin Ultimatum cryptocurrency. The dossier also alleges connections to criminal groups, including the "Zalyutynski" gang, and a partnership with Yuriy Poltavskyi, who has multiple convictions, including for robbery.
