= Volodymyr Struk =

Ukrainian politician (1964–2022)

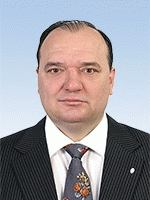

Mayor of Kreminna
- In office 25 October 2020 – 2 March 2022

Member of the Verkhovna Rada
- In office 12 December 2012 – 27 November 2014

Personal details
- Born: Volodymyr Oleksiiovych Struk; 15 May 1964 Lozivskyi, Slovianoserbsk Raion, Voroshylovhrad Oblast, Ukrainian SSR, Soviet Union
- Died: 2 March 2022 (aged 57) Kreminna, Ukraine
- Party: Party of Regions; OPZZh
- Education: Luhansk State University of Internal Affairs

Volodymyr Oleksiyovych Struk (Ukrainian: Володимир Олексійович Струк; 15 May 1964 – 2 March 2022) was a Ukrainian politician. He was kidnapped and killed in March 2022, during the Russian invasion of Ukraine, when he was serving as mayor of the city of Kreminna, Luhansk Oblast, at the time under control of the Ukrainian government. His killing has been reported as a response to his pro-Russia separatist activities and was denounced as an extrajudicial execution and a war crime by a representative of the internationally unrecognized Luhansk People's Republic.

== Life ==
He graduated from Luhansk State University of Internal Affairs.

He was born on 15 May 1964 in the village of Lozivske, Slovianoserbsk Raion, Luhansk region. He worked as a 1st-class driver at a Oleksandrivsk auto enterprise, had a master of industrial driving training at the Voroshilovgrad driving school, was a 4th grade electric and gas welder at the "Luhanska No. 1" mine, head of the production department at "Metalousor" LLC (Luhansk), director of the Collective Agricultural Enterprise "Artil Center" (Luhansk).

In 2001 he graduated from the Luhansk State University of Internal Affairs and in 2009 from the National Academy of Public Administration in Kyiv.

From 1998 to 2006, he was deputy of the Luhansk City Council. A member of the Party of Regions and later the Opposition Platform — For Life. Struk served in the Verkhovna Rada (Ukraine's national parliament) from 2012 to 2014. He was elected in the 2012 Ukrainian parliamentary election as an independent candidate in Luhansk Oblast's electoral district 104 with 39,98% of the vote.

On 16 May 2014, criminal proceedings were initiated against Struk by the Luhansk Regional Prosecutor's Office. He was accused of having called for a change of the territorial boundaries of Ukraine. In early 2020 the Security Service of Ukraine refused to hold Struk accountable for his participation in the creation of a "terrorist republic" in the Luhansk region.

In the 25 October 2020 Ukrainian local elections Struk was elected mayor of Kreminna with 51.68% of the votes.

== Death ==
On 1 March 2022 Struk's wife reported to the police that unknown men in camouflage had kidnapped her husband from their home. The following day he was found dead with a gunshot wound to the heart, reportedly in the nearby village of Zhytlivka.

The killing of Struk was announced by Anton Herashchenko, advisor and a former deputy minister at the Ukrainian Ministry of Internal Affairs. In the evening of the 2 March, he published on his Telegram channel a photo of the body of Struk and commented "one less traitor to Ukraine." Herashchenko added that since the beginning of the Russo-Ukrainian war in 2014, the Ukrainian authorities "could not do anything about the outspoken separatist Struk" because he "had a lot of money. Most likely with the support of the Russian Federation." However, when the Russian troops were approaching Kreminna 15 kilometers away, “Struk was tried by a people's tribunal" and shot by "unknown patriots" as a "traitor under the laws of wartime." According to Herashchenko, Struk had been an organiser of the 2014 secessionist referendum in Luhansk Oblast, was a supporter of the Luhansk People's Republic (LPR) and since the beginning of the Russian invasion he had actively called on local deputies to communicate with the Russian Federation and the LPR.
