= Vitaliy Komarnytskyi (politician) =

Ukrainian politician (born 1964)

- Віталій Комарницький

14th Governor of Luhansk Oblast
- In office 5 July 2019 – 25 October 2019
- Preceded by: Serhiy Fil
- Succeeded by: Serhiy Haidai

Personal details
- Born: 15 March 1964 (age 62) Trudolyubivka, Nyzhnohirskyi Raion, Crimean Oblast, Ukrainian SSR, Soviet Union (now Ukraine)
- Party: Independent
- Other political affiliations: Party of Regions (until 2014)
- Children: 2
- Education: Luhansk State University of Internal Affairs & Kharkiv National University of Construction and Architecture
- Occupation: Politician
- Profession: Civil engineer; jurist

Vitaliy Marianovych Komarnytskyi (Ukrainian: Віталій Мар'янович Комарницький; born 15 March 1964) is a Ukrainian jurist, civil engineer, and politician who served as the Head of the Luhansk Military-Civil Administration in 2019.

== Early life ==
Komarnytskyi was born into a Ukrainian family in the Nyzhnohirskyi Raion in eastern Crimea. In 1986, he graduated from University of Kharkiv in the field of civil engineering. In 2001, he graduated from the Luhansk State University of Internal Affairs in the field of jurisprudence, and later in 2003 he defended his dissertation and earned the degree of Candidate of Legal Sciences. Between 1986 and 2010, he held multiple leading positions within the academic system of the Ministry of Internal Affairs of the Luhansk Oblast in Eastern Ukraine.

== Political career ==
In 2010, he was elected as a member of the Luhansk Oblast Council for the Party of Regions, and served as a deputy until its dissolution in 2014, when Russian proxy and regular forces captured and occupied large parts of Eastern Ukraine's Donbas region. During his time as a deputy, he spoke about Slavic unity, and quoted Aleksandr Solzhenitsyn's idea of a united Slavic state encompassing Russia, Ukraine, and Belarus. For this, in 2014, journalist Denys Kazanskyi called him a "Ukrainophobe" and said that he supported the Luhansk regional council resolutions that appealed to Russia for help. Later, in an interview conducted with the BBC in 2019, he denied the allegations and stated he never supported the vote and was not present, and he argued that he proved his loyalty when he evacuated from occupied Luhansk and did not hold any anti-Ukrainian views. Following his term as deputy, he returned to being rector of the Luhansk University of Internal Affairs, which he had been since 2007, and helped evacuate the university to Mykolaiv, then Sumy, and finally to Severodonetsk in 2016. During this time, he and the university worked on creating a reintegration concept for Luhansk Oblast for the Ukrainian government, which would have combatants of occupied territories face criminal liability, non-combotant supporters have administrative liability, and ordinary civilians receive none, and advocated for still treating residents of occupied Luhansk as Ukrainian.

On 5 July 2019, he was appointed as the Head of the Military-Civil Administration of the Luhansk Oblast by the Cabinet of Ministers under Prime Minister Volodymyr Groysman. He resigned from his post in October of the same year, and was succeeded by Serhiy Haidai.

== Personal life ==
Komarnytskyi is married and has two children.
