= Anatoliy Kasyanov =

Ukrainian politician (1939-2025)

- Анатолій Касьянов

Chairman of the Luhansk Oblast Council
- In office 26 May 1987 – 12 April 1990
- Preceded by: Rid Zverev
- Succeeded by: Eduard Khananov
- In office April 1992 – 10 July 1994
- Preceded by: Eduard Khananov
- Succeeded by: Petro Kupin

Personal details
- Born: Anatoliy Vasilyevich Kasyanov; 3 March 1939 (age 87) Nova Karakuba, Ukrainian SSR, Soviet Union (now Ukraine)
- Died: January 12, 2025 (aged 85)
- Party: Communist Party of the Soviet Union
- Education: Kharkiv National Automobile and Highway University

Anatoliy Vasilyevich Kasyanov (Ukrainian: Анатолій Касьянов; 3 March 1939-12 January 2025) was a Ukrainian politician who served as Chairman of the Luhansk Oblast Council two times, from 1987 to 1990 and from 1992 to 1994.

== Early life ==
Kasyanov was born on 3 March 1939 in the village of Nova Karakuba, which was then part of the Ukrainian SSR in the Soviet Union. He was the son of Vasyl and Anisia Prokopivna. After graduating from secondary school, he pursued higher education, enrolling at the Kharkiv National Automobile and Highway University, where he graduated in 1961 with a specialisation in engineering for communication routes. Kasyanov then started working at "Lysychanskzhytlobud" in the city of Sievierodonetsk until 1964, where he steadily rose up the ranks from foreman to senior foreman within the construction department there. He departed from the organisation in 1964 to become chief engineer at "Severodonetskprombud", where he worked for a decade, eventually becoming Head of the Construction Department there.

== Political career ==
In 1974, he left construction and entered politics, becoming the 2nd Secretary of the Sievierodonetsk City Committee, later being promoted to 1st Secretary of the committee. In 1984, he was then transferred to become Secretary of the Voroshilovgrad Oblast Committee (now the Luhansk Oblast Council). In 1987, he became Chairman of the Regional Executive Committee of Voroshilovgrad Oblast (now Luhansk Oblast). He was responsible for the construction of many buildings during his tenure, including the Palace of Culture of Chemists and the Ice Palace in Sievierodonetsk. During the start of the 1990s Donbas miners' strikes, he blamed the central government for the problems, and criticised the implementation of perestroika which he said was not doing anything. In fact, during a regional party conference in the spring of 1990, he said the government was making serious mistakes and that the region was deteriorating. He stayed in this role for three years until 1990, when he stepped down in favour of Eduard Khananov and became Chairman of the Voroshilovgrad Regional Council of People's Deputies.

After the collapse of the Soviet Union, he still continued to be the Chairman of the Luhansk Regional Council of People's Deputies until June of 1992, when he was promoted back to Chairman of the Luhansk Oblast Council. Upon taking the post, much like during his first term, he continued to blame the leadership in Ukraine and he instead proposed creating an economic union with CIS. In 1994, he once again stepped down when Petro Kupin was elected to the post, with Kasyanov becoming Chairman of the Luhansk Oblast branch of the State Property Fund of Ukraine. He later stepped down. After retiring, he continued to live in Sievierodonetsk, and occasionally worked in politics still, becoming an assistant to two People's Deputy of Ukraine: Valentyn Dzon and Leonid Fesenko.

== Personal life ==
He was married to Lyudmila Fedorovna, an employee at Severodonchanka LLC. They had two sons: Oleg, a specialist at the company "Donbass", and Dmitry, director of the company "Mir".

On 12 January 2025, it was reported by the pro-Russian media in Luhansk Oblast that Kasyanov had died. It was reported by them that he had lived in the city of Sievierodonetsk until his death, even after it was occupied following the Battle of Sievierodonetsk in 2022.

== Honours and awards ==
Kasyanov was awarded the following honours:

- Order of the Badge of Honour (twice, 1971 and 1981)
- Order of Merit (1999)
