= Hennadiy Moskal =

Ukrainian politician (1950–2024)

- Геннадій Москаль
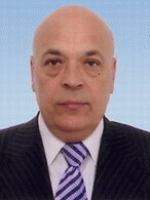
- Official portrait, 2007

Governor of Zakarpattia Oblast
- In office 15 July 2015 – 11 June 2019
- President: Petro Poroshenko
- Preceded by: Vasyl Hubal
- Succeeded by: Ivan Duran (acting)
- In office 1 June 2001 – 27 September 2002
- President: Leonid Kuchma
- Preceded by: Viktor Baloha
- Succeeded by: Ivan Rizak

Governor of Luhansk Oblast
- In office 18 September 2014 – 15 July 2015
- President: Petro Poroshenko
- Preceded by: Iryna Verihina (acting)
- Succeeded by: Yuriy Klimenko (acting)
- In office 8 November 2005 – 26 April 2006
- President: Viktor Yushchenko
- Preceded by: Oleksiy Danilov
- Succeeded by: Oleksandr Kobityev (acting)

Member of the Verkhovna Rada
- In office 23 November 2007 – 27 November 2014

Representatives of the President of Ukraine in Crimea
- In office 17 May 2006 – 23 November 2007
- President: Viktor Yushchenko
- Preceded by: Volodymyr Kulish
- Succeeded by: Viktor Shemchuk

Personal details
- Born: 11 December 1950 Zadubrivka, Ukrainian SSR, Soviet Union
- Died: 17 March 2024 (aged 73)
- Party: Batkivshchyna
- Other political affiliations: Front of Changes (December 2011 to June 2013)
- Children: 1 daughter
- Occupation: Politician, lawyer
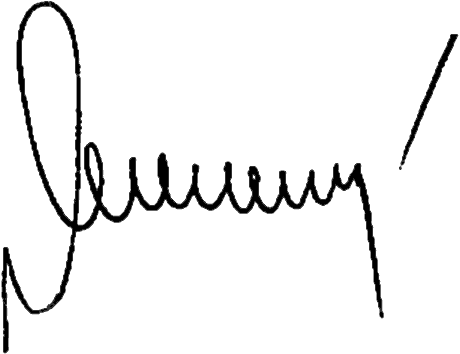
- Signature

Hennadiy Hennadiyovych Moskal (Ukrainian: Геннадій Геннадійович Москаль; 11 December 1950 – 17 March 2024) was a Ukrainian politician who served as governor of Zakarpattia Oblast from 2015 to 2019. He was previously appointed governor of Luhansk Oblast during the early stages of the War in Donbas.

Moskal also acted as Deputy Minister of Internal Affairs of Ukraine and was a Merited Jurist of Ukraine (1997).

== Biography ==
Moskal was born on 11 December 1950 in Zadubrivka, Chernivtsi Oblast into a family of public servants. His father, Hennadiy Hadeyovych Hayfulin (or Hayfullin), was an ethnic Tatar. His mother, Stepaniya Pavlivna Moskal, was an ethnic Ukrainian.

=== Education ===
Gennady Moskal graduated from the Chernivtsi Railway College, then in

- 1981 – Kyiv Higher School of the USSR Ministry of Internal Affairs named after Dzerzhinsky
- 1984 – the Academy of Ministry of Internal Affairs of the USSR (ru) in Moscow

=== Career ===
In 1975, Moskal started working as detective of Soviet police (Militsiya) in Chernivtsi, where he advanced from inspector to Militsiya Lieutenant General. During working in the structures of the Ministry of Internal Affairs he was the Deputy Chief of Militsiya in Chernivtsi oblast.

- 1978–1992 – Chief of criminal investigation department of Chernivtsi Oblast militsiya (with breaks)
  - 1983–1986 – Deputy chief of militsiya in the Lenin district of Chernivtsi
- 1992–1995 – Chief of criminal militsiya in Chernivtsi Oblast
- 1995–1997 – Chief of militsiya in Zakarpattia Oblast.
- 1997–2000 – Deputy Minister of Internal Affairs, Chief of militsiya in Crimea
- 2000–2001 – Internal Affairs, Chief of militsiya in Dnipropetrovsk region
- June 2001 – September 2002 – Governor of Zakarpattia Oblast
- 2002–2005 – Chairman of State Committee on Nationalities and Migration
- February 2005 – November 2005 – Deputy Minister of Internal Affairs, Chief of criminal militsiya
- November 2005 – April 2006 – Governor of Luhansk region
- 2006 – the Permanent Representative of President of Ukraine in Crimea
- 9 January 2007 – appointed the Deputy Chairman of the Security Service of Ukraine (SBU) by Presidential Decree.
- April 2007 – May 2007 – Deputy Secretary of RNBU

=== Verkhovna Rada ===
In autumn 2007, Gennady Moskal was elected People's Deputy of Ukraine from Our Ukraine–People's Self-Defense Bloc (under No. 41). In Verkhovna Rada, he performed duties of the 1st Deputy Chairman of the committee to combat organized crime and corruption. At the time of elections in 2007, Moskal was the president of the Kyiv law firm "Protection".

On 19 August 2009, Gennady Moskal was re-appointed the Chief of the Internal Affairs Department in the Autonomous Republic of Crimea, but in order to keep the parliamentary mandate, he resigned on 15 December 2009; on 16 December 2009, he was reinstated in the former position by the government. On 3 February 2010, President Viktor Yushchenko sent an inquiry to the Constitutional Court of Ukraine on the legality of coordinating both positions by Moskal; after that, Moskal resigned in Crimea.

Moskal joined the party Front of Changes in December 2011. In 2012 he was re-elected into parliament on the party list of Fatherland. On 15 June 2013, his Front for Change (party) merged into Batkivschyna. On 25 August 2014 Moskal was expelled from Batkivschyna because he had supported and campaigned for Petro Poroshenko in the 25 May Ukrainian presidential election and not Batkivschyna's presidential candidate Yulia Tymoshenko. From then until June 2019 Moskal was a member of the Petro Poroshenko Bloc.

In the 2019 Ukrainian parliamentary election Moskal did not get elected (as an independent candidate) after losing in single-seat constituency 106 in Sievierodonetsk, with 11.99% of the vote.

=== Luhansk Oblast Governor and Governor of Zakarpattia Oblast ===
On 18 September 2014, President Petro Poroshenko appointed Moskal Luhansk Oblast Governor. At that time Luhansk Oblast was one of the front-lines of the war in Donbas. On 15 July 2015, he was dismissed as Governor. Moskal was appointed Governor of Zakarpattia Oblast the same day. President Volodymyr Zelenskyy dismissed Moskal and replaced him with Ivan Duran as acting Governor on 11 June 2019.

=== Personal life and death ===
Moskal was married and had one daughter and two grandchildren. He died on 17 March 2024, at the age of 73. It was reported that he died "from a serious illness."

== Awards ==
- 1997 – Honoured Lawyer of Ukraine
- Honoured lawyer of AR Crimea
- Order of Merit, III and II grades
- Award "Nominal firearm"
- 2002 – Winner of the All-Ukrainian program "Leaders of the Regions"
