= Gorenko =

Gorenko is a Ukrainian surname. Notable people with the surname include:

- Anna Gorenko, birth name of Anna Akhmatova, Russian poet
- Sergei Gorenko (1982–2022), politician of the separatist Luhansk People's Republic, Ukraine
- Nykodym Gorenko (born 1972), bishop of the Ukrainian Orthodox Church (Moscow Patriarchate)
