= Council of Luhansk =

Council of Luhansk or Parliament of Luhansk may refer to:

- Luhansk Oblast Council the provincial parliament of the Ukrainian Oblast Luhansk
- People's Council of the Luhansk People's Republic, the regional parliament of the Luhansk People's Republic, an unrecognized republic in the Russian Federation
