= Serhiy Fil =

Ukrainian politician (born 1981)

- Сергій Філь

Governor of Luhansk Oblast (acting)
- In office 22 November 2018 – 5 July 2019
- President: Petro Poroshenko; Volodymyr Zelenskyy
- Preceded by: Yuriy Harbuz
- Succeeded by: Vitaliy Komarnytskyi

Personal details
- Born: Serhiy Oleksandrovych Fil; 7 February 1981 (age 45) Kiev, Ukrainian SSR, Soviet Union (now Kyiv, Ukraine)
- Other political affiliations: All-Ukrainian Union "Cherkashchany"
- Education: Institute of Municipal Management and Business; Taras Shevchenko National University of Kyiv

Serhiy Oleksandrovych Fil (Ukrainian: Сергій Філь; born 7 February 1981) is a Ukrainian businessman and politician who served as acting Governor of Luhansk Oblast from 2018 to 2019 under presidents Petro Poroshenko and briefly Volodymyr Zelenskyy.

== Early life ==
Fil was born on 7 February 1981 in the capital of Kiev, which was then part of the Ukrainian SSR in the Soviet Union. After graduating from secondary school, he immediately entered politics, becoming deputy chairman of the organisation of the Union of Christian Democratic Youth within Kyiv. After doing this for two years, he moved to Zhytomyr to become a volunteer assistant and consultant to the People's Deputy of Ukraine Vitaliy Zhuravskyi. After two years, he resigned and moved back to Kyiv, becoming vice-president of the law firm "Prime-Time" in Kyiv. In 1999, Fil returned to Zhytomyr to return to his position as a volunteer assistant to Zhuravskyi until 2002, when Zhuravskyi's mandate ended for his first term. After Zhuravskyi's term ended, Fil once again returned to Kyiv, became secretary-assistant at the "Union of Metropolitan Lawyers" within Kyiv. He also graduated from the Institute of Municipal Management and Business that year with the title of economist.

After a little less than a year, Fil again became a volunteer assistant to Kyrylo Polishchuk, although Polishchuk represented Kyiv. When his term also ended in 2006, Fil registered for employment in the Dniprovskyi District before becoming secretary for regional development of the All-Ukrainian Union "Cherkashchany". He stayed in this role for another year before moving on to being chief researcher of the scientific and editorial centre of the State Institute for Family and Youth Development. Fil then became general director of the Petrivsko-Romny Brick Plant in the village of Petrivka-Romenska (Myrhorod Raion). He stayed in this role for another three years before becoming an entrepreneur in Kyiv and deputy director for production issues at Cosmetic-Services. Finally, before entering politics, he became the legal advisor of Spiko LLC in the village of Myrne (Berdychiv Raion). This was also the time he graduated as a lawyer from Taras Shevchenko National University of Kyiv.

== Political career ==
In February 2016, Fil finally entered politics himself, becoming Head of the Executive Office of the Poltava Oblast Council. However, this lasted less than a month, when he then temporarily stopped working. He was then appointed Deputy Head of Luhansk Regional Military-Civil Administration, which by then was based in Sievierodonetsk due to the War in the Donbas, in July 2017. He was promoted by order of the governor on 4 October 2018 to First Deputy Head of the Luhansk Regional Military-Civil Administration.

In November 2018, he was promoted to Governor of Luhansk Oblast (also Head of the Luhansk Regional Military-Civil Administration) upon the resignation of Yuriy Harbuz. During his tenure, he signed a memorandum of cooperation with DAI Global LLC as part of the "Economic Support for Eastern Ukraine" project of USAID, which focuses on restoring infrastructure due to the War in the Donbas. Other key priorities during his term were medical facilities, as he established rural medical outpatient clinics across Luhansk Oblast, and also educational reform as part of the "New Ukrainian School" curriculum. The last important programs during his tenure were in transport, including improving the routes to Stanytsia Luhanska and Shchastia, due to their proximity to the Luhansk People's Republic. On 5 July 2019, he was replaced permanently by Vitaliy Komarnytskyi in the post, shortly after Volodymyr Zelenskyy took power.
