= Oleksiy Smyrnov =

Ukrainian politician (born 1976)

- Олексій Смирнов

Governor of Luhansk Oblast (Acting)
- In office 16 March 2023 – 12 April 2023
- Preceded by: Serhiy Haidai
- Succeeded by: Artem Lysohor

Personal details
- Born: 19 September 1976 (age 49) Verbova, Ukrainian SSR, Soviet Union

Oleksiy Ivanovych Smyrnov (Ukrainian: Олексій Іванович Смирнов; born 19 September 1976) is a Ukrainian politician and prosecutor who served as the acting Governor of Luhansk Oblast in 2023.

== Biography ==
Oleksiy Smyrnov was born on 19 September 1976 in Verbova, Tomashpil Raion.

In 1997, Smyrnov graduated from the Law Faculty of East Ukrainian State University, and began to work as an assistant prosecutor, later deputy prosecutor of Slovianoserbsk Raion. Further, Smyrnov worked as a senior prosecutor of the prosecutor's office of Luhansk Oblast. From 2008 to 2015, Smyrnov worked as a prosecutor of the Slovianoserbsk Raion. In 2015 he has worked as a deputy prosecutor of Luhansk Oblast.

On 24 February 2020, by the order of the head of the Luhansk Regional State Administration, Serhiy Haidai, Smyrnov was appointed the first deputy chairman of the regional administration.

After Haidai's resignation, Syrnov became the acting Governor of Luhansk Oblast on 15 March 2023. On 12 April, he was replaced by his successor, Artem Lysohor.
