= Zymohiria =

City in Luhansk Oblast, Ukraine

Zymohiria Зимогір'я
- City
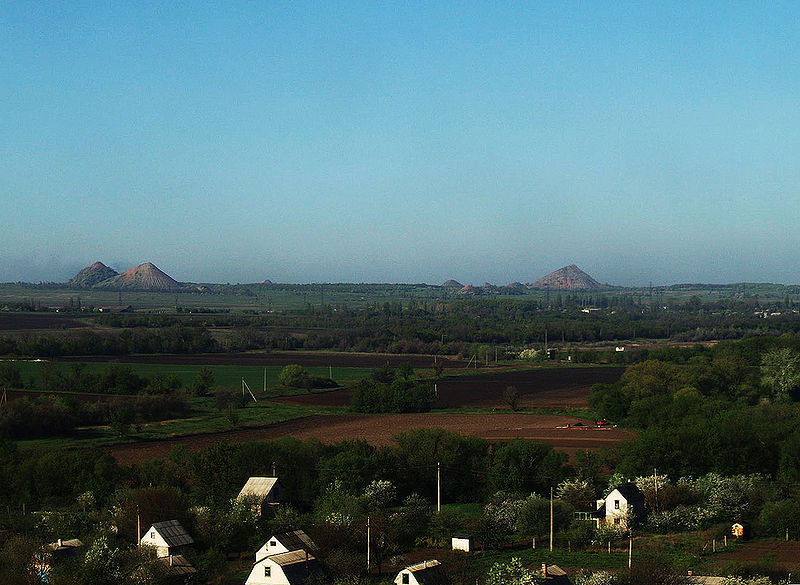

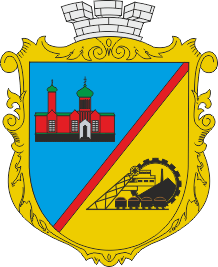
- Coat of arms
- Interactive map of Zymohiria
- Location of Zymohiria within Ukraine Zymohiria (Luhansk Oblast)
- Coordinates: 48°34′55″N 38°55′55″E
- Country: Ukraine
- Oblast: Luhansk Oblast
- Raion: Alchevsk Raion
- Hromada: Zymohiria urban hromada

Area
  - Total: 8.56 km^{2} (3.31 sq mi)

Population (2022)
  - Total: 9,557
  - Density: 1,120/km^{2} (2,890/sq mi)
- Time zone: UTC+2 (EET)
  - Summer (DST): UTC+3 (EEST)
- Postal code: 93742
- Area code: +380 6473
- Climate: Dfb

Zymohiria (Ukrainian: Зимогір'я; Russian: Зимогорье) is a small city in Alchevsk Raion, Luhansk Oblast (region) of Ukraine. Residence of Zymohiria urban hromada. Population: 9,557 (2022 estimate), 9,949 (2013 est.).

Since 2014, Zymohiria has been under Russian occupation as part of the self-proclaimed Luhansk People's Republic.

On 27 June 2022, during a full-scale war, an ammunition depot of the occupation forces located in the village caught fire and then exploded. The day before, a similar fire at an ammunition depot occurred in the temporarily occupied Svatove and Khrustalne. Later it became known that the warehouse was hit by the Ukrainian military with high-precision rockets from HIMARS systems.

== Geography ==
The town is located on both sides of the river Luhan (a tributary of the Siverskyi Donets), 15 kilometers from the former district center of Slovianoserbsk. Zymohiria railway station on the Lyman-Rodakove line. It stretches for 17 kilometers from east to west and 8 kilometers from south to north. The area is 49.5 square kilometers. Neighboring settlements: Khoroshe and Petrovenky villages (upstream of Luhany) in the northwest, Novohryhorivka and Smile in the north, Stepove, Dovhe and the village of Slovianoserbsk in the northeast, Novodachne and Sukhodil villages, Krasnyi Luch and Zamostia (downstream of Luhany) in the east, the villages of Rodakove, Bile, Yurivka in the southeast, Lotykove and Mykhailivka in the south, the village of Petrivka, the villages of Kryvorizhzhia, Lozivskyi, Karpaty in the southwest, and Yasnodolsk in the west.

== Demographics ==
Ethnic and linguistic composition of Zymohiria:

Ethnic groups in Zymohiria
	percent
Ukrainians	74.99%
Russians	22.50%
Belarusians	0.94%
Tatars	0.35%

Native languages in Zymohiria
Languages	percent
Ukrainian	59.6%
Russian	39.4%
Belarusian	0.3%
others	0.5%

== Notable people ==
- Oleksiy Semenenko (born 1958), Ukrainian journalist
