= Lisohor =

Lisohor (Ukrainian: Лісогор) and Lysohor (Ukrainian: Лисогор) are Ukrainian surnames. Alternative transliterations include Lisogor and Lysogor.

Notable bearers include:

- Maryna Lisohor (born 1983), Ukrainian cross-country skier
- Oleh Lisohor (born 1979), Ukrainian swimmer
- Oleksandr Lisohor (born 2004), Ukrainian cross-country skier
- Artem Lysohor (born 1983), Ukrainian politician
