= Leonid Daineko =

Ukrainian politician (born 1935)

- Леонід Дайнеко
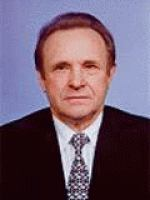
- Official portrait from 1998.

Chairman of the Luhansk Oblast Council
- In office 25 September 1996 – 24 April 1998
- President: Leonid Kuchma
- Preceded by: Petro Kupin
- Succeeded by: Viktor Tikhonov

People's Deputy of Ukraine
- In office March 1998 – April 2002

Personal details
- Born: Leonid Ivanovich Daineko; 14 January 1935 (age 91) Vyshnevka (Klichaw district), Byelorussian SSR, Soviet Union (now Belarus)
- Other political affiliations: Communist Party of the Soviet Union; Communist Party of Ukraine
- Education: Rostov State University

Leonid Ivanovich Daineko (Ukrainian: Леонід Дайнеко; born 14 January 1935) is a Belarusian-born Ukrainian politician who served as Chairman of the Luhansk Oblast Council from 1996 to 1998 and then as a People's Deputy of Ukraine from 1998 to 2002, representing the Communist Party of Ukraine.

== Early life ==
Daineko was born on 14 January 1935 in the village of Vyshnevka, which was then part of the Byelorussian SSR in the Soviet Union. He is ethnically Belarusian. After graduating from secondary school, he moved to Ukraine to study at the Voroshilovgrad Machine-Building College in Voroshilovgrad (now Luhansk). However, he only studied there for a month before leaving to complete his mandatory service in the Soviet Army for three years, until 1957. Once he returned to Ukraine, he worked as a secretary of the Komsomol before becoming an educator in Voroshilovgrad. He left this too in 1959, becoming an instructor and later secretary Oktiabrskyi District of Voroshilovgrad for the Komsomol until 1962. He was later promoted to Deputy Head of the Department of Propaganda for the Komsomol in Voroshilovgrad until 1965, when he became an instructor in the department for four years until 1969. During this time, he graduated from the Faculty of Law at the Rostov State University in Russia, achieving the qualification of lawyer. In 1969, he became assistant to the 1st Secretary of the Voroshilovgrad Regional Committee, which he did for another decade until 1979.

== Political career ==
In 1979, Daineko was finally promoted to secretary of the Luhansk Regional Executive Committee, which he later became deputy chairman of in 1982. He stayed in this role for a decade until the collapse of the Soviet Union, when he briefly left politics and became editor-in-chief of the "Book of Memory" in Luhansk until 1994. He only returned to politics in 1994 when he was given the post of Deputy Chairman of the now Luhansk Oblast Council. During this time, he actively criticised then-president Leonid Kuchma, whom he claimed was authoritarian. In October 1995, Petro Kupin resigned from the post of chairman, and thus Daineko became acting Chairman of the Luhansk Oblast Council. He was affirmed as full chairman in September of 1996 after an extraordinary session of the council in which no other candidates ran because the opposition did not want to oppose the candidacy when it was only a short time away from the 1998 Ukrainian parliamentary election. During his relatively short time as chairman, he differed little in his policies from Kupin, with Daineko only making repeated statements against the government in Kyiv, and he advocated for a state monopoly on foreign trade.

During the 1998 Ukrainian parliamentary election, Daineko decided to leave the post and ran to be a People's Deputy of Ukraine in the Verkhovna Rada as a member of the Communist Party of Ukraine. He was successfully elected for the 3rd convocation via the party list of the CPU/KPU as member no. 51. During the third convocation, he served as Chair of the Subcommittee on the Activities of Councils and Local Self-Government Bodies from July 1998 and as a member of the Special Control Commission on Privatisation. During the 2002 Ukrainian parliamentary election, he attempted to run for reelection, but this time not on the party list but for a single-member constituency (No. 107, Luhansk Oblast). He lost to Viktor Kirillov, achieving second place with 20.38% of the vote compared to Kirillov's 22.10%.

== Personal life ==
He has a daughter born in 1970 that is an editor at the Luhansk Regional Cable Television.

== Honours and awards ==
Daineko has been awarded the following honours:

- Order of the Badge of Honour (1986)
