= Yurii Shapovalov =

Ukrainian politician

- Юрій Шаповалов
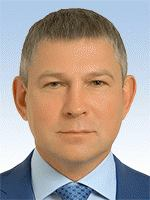
- Official portrait, 2019

People's Deputy of Ukraine
- Incumbent
- Assumed office 12 December 2012
- Preceded by: Constituency re-established
- Constituency: Poltava Oblast, No. 146

Personal details
- Born: 14 March 1972 (age 54) Kremenchuk, Ukrainian SSR, Soviet Union (now Ukraine)
- Party: Independent
- Other political affiliations: Front for Change; Party of Regions (2012–2014); People's Will (2014–2016); Revival (2016–2019); For the Future (since 2019)
- Education: Kharkiv National Automobile and Highway University

Yurii Anatoliiovych Shapovalov (Ukrainian: Юрій Анатолійович Шаповалов; born 14 March 1972) is a Ukrainian politician. He served as a People's Deputy of Ukraine from Ukraine's 146th electoral district in Poltava Oblast beginning in 2012. Prior to his election, he was a member of the Kremenchuk City Council.

== Early life ==
Shapovavlov studied at primary school No. 15 and secondary school No. 21 in Kremenchuk. He graduated from Kharkiv National Automobile and Highway University, studying "Automobiles and Automobile Industry" achieving "Technical operation of vehicles", qualification of mechanical engineer. He was a regional deputy director of Foxtrot company in Kremenchuk.

== Political career ==
Shapovalov was a deputy of the Kremenchuk City Council for the Front for Change party from 2010 to 2012.

He became a People's Deputy of Ukraine of the 7th convocation (2012-2014). He was elected in constituency 146 (Kremenchuk, Poltava Oblast) as an independent politician with 34.35% of the votes, but in parliament joined the Party of Regions faction. In February 2014 he left this faction and joined the parliamentary group Sovereign European Ukraine. He became Chairman of the Subcommittee on Antimonopoly Policy and Development of Economic Competition of the Verkhovna Rada of Ukraine Committee on Entrepreneurship, Regulatory and Antimonopoly Policy.

In the 2014 Ukrainian parliamentary election Shapovavlov was reelected in constituency 146 (2014-2019). He was elected with 22.67% of the votes. Until 2016 he was a member of the parliamentary group "People's Will". He then became a member of the parliamentary group Revival. He served as Secretary of the Verkhovna Rada of Ukraine Committee on Transport.

In the July 2019 Ukrainian parliamentary election Shapovavlov was elected as a self-nominee, again in constituency 146. In this election he was elected with 27.08% of the votes.

Shapovalov then became a member of the For the Future parliamentary group. He is Secretary of the Verkhovna Rada of Ukraine Committee on Energy, Housing and Utilities Services.

== Personal life ==
In the 2019 Ukrainian parliamentary election Shapovalov's nephew Oleksiy Movchan was elected to parliament for the Servant of the People party in Ukraine's 150th electoral district. Movchan was elected with 42.54% of the votes.
