= Hennadiy Fomenko =

Ukrainian politician (1943–2017)

- Геннадій Фоменко
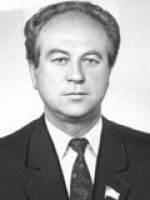

Governor of Luhansk Oblast
- In office 8 August 1996 – 7 April 1998
- Succeeded by: Oleksandr Yefremov

Governor of Luhansk Oblast (acting)
- In office 3 November 1995 – 8 August 1996
- Preceded by: Petro Kupin

Member of the Verkhovna Rada
- In office 15 May 1990 – 10 May 1994

Personal details
- Born: Hennadiy Petrovych Fomenko; 25 February 1943 Kadiivka, Ukraine, Soviet Union
- Died: 22 August 2017 (aged 74) Luhansk

Hennadiy Petrovych Fomenko (Ukrainian: Геннадій Петрович Фоменко; 25 February 1943 - 22 August 2017), was a Ukrainian politician who served as the Governor of Luhansk Oblast from 1995 to 1998.

He also served as the Member of the Verkhovna Rada from 1990 to 1994.

== Biography ==
Hennadiy Fomenko was born in Kadiivka on 25 February 1943, into a family of workers.

He began his career in 1960, where he was a turner's apprentice, a turner at the Kadiivka Machine-Building Plant in Luhansk Oblast. In 1962, he was a driver of convoy No. 5 of the Kadiivka Motor Depot in Luhansk Oblast.

From 1962 to 1965, he served in the Soviet Army.

From 1965 to 1970, he was a student at the Kommunar Mining and Metallurgical Institute of Luhansk Oblast, majoring in mechanical engineering technology, where he earned a degree in mechanical engineering.

Between July 1970 and March 1987, he was a foreman, shop manager, and then promoted as the head of the technical control department, chief engineer of the Kadiyiv (Stakhanov) Machine-Building Plant in the Voroshilovgrad region.

He joined the Communist Party of the Soviet Union in 1973.

In 1978, he graduated from the Donetsk Polytechnic Institute, majoring in industrial production organization, without leaving production.

In March 1987, he was promoted to the Director of the Stakhanov Machine-Building Plant in the Voroshilovgrad Region.

Between August 1989 and April 1992, he was the chairman of the executive committee of the Stakhanov City Council of People's Deputies of the Luhansk Oblast.

On 18 March 1990, Fomenko was elected a member of parliament, People's Deputy of Ukraine, 2nd round 51.63% of the vote, 8 applicants to the Verkhovna Rada. He took office on 15 May. He was a member of the Commission on the Activities of Councils of People's Deputies and the Development of Local Self-Government.

In April 1992, Fomenko was appointed as the 1st Deputy Head of the Luhansk Oblast State Administration.

From July 1994 to August 1995, he was the first 1st Deputy Chairman of the executive committee of the Luhansk Regional Council of Workers' Deputies for Executive Work. On 8 August, he became the 1st Deputy Head of the Luhansk Oblast State Administration for the second time.

On 3 November, Fomenko became the acting Governor of Luhansk Oblast, before officially taking office on 8 August 1996.

On 7 April 1998, he left office.

He lived in Luhansk since then, where he died on 22 August 2017.
