= Iryna Verihina =

- Ірина Верігіна

Governor of Luhansk Oblast (acting)
- In office 10 May 2014 – 15 September 2014
- Preceded by: Mykhailo Bolotskykh
- Succeeded by: Hennadiy Moskal

Personal details
- Born: Iryna Kostyantynivna Verihina; 4 June 1968 (age 58) Oleksandrivka, Ukrainian SSR, Soviet Union
- Party: Batkivshchyna (since 2005)

Iryna Kostyantynivna Verihina (Ukrainian: Ірина Костянтинівна Верігіна; born on 4 June 1968) is a Ukrainian politician who served as the acting Governor of Luhansk Oblast in 2014. She is also a Member of the National Union of Journalists of Ukraine.

A member of Batkivshchyna, she had been appointed as the head of the regional state administration on 17 March 2014 was appointed as first deputy head of the Luhansk Oblast State Administration.

She has openly condemned Russian military aggression in the territories of Luhansk and Donetsk Oblasts against Ukraine.

She was also the head of the Luhansk Regional Organization of the Batkivshchyna Political Party since 2010.

She is a member of the Coordination Council of the Public Human Rights Organization All -Ukrainian Movement "Power of Law".

== Biography ==
Iryna Verihina was born on 4 June 1968.

In August 1987, she attended the History Faculty of the Khabarovsk Pedagogical Institute. In June 1991, she graduated from the institute, receiving a diploma of a teacher of history and social studies.

In 1982, together with her family, she moved to Alkatvaam of the Chukotka Autonomous Okrug. In September 1985, she graduated from school and went to work for the Novokakhovsky electric shift.

From September 1985 to December 1986, she was a distributor of works of the repair and mechanical shop of the Novokakhovsky Electrical Plant, in Nova Kakhovka.

From January to September 1987, she was a Senior Pioneer of the Berrygovsk Secondary School of Magadan Oblast.

From August 1987 to June 1990, she was a student of the day department of the Faculty of History of the Khabarovsk State Pedagogical Institute in Khabarovsk.

From August 1990 to October 1995, she was a teacher of the history of the Nagornnean secondary school of the Magadan Oblast.

In 1995, she moved with her family to Krasnyi Luch of the Luhansk Oblast. Until 2005, she worked at the Luch television and radio company television journalist and deputy editor. The same year, she became a member of the Krasnoloi city organization of the Fatherland political party, and the following year was elected its chairman.

From 2006 to January 2008, she worked as an assistant to the People's Deputy of the Verkhovna Rada Nataliya Korolevska of the Batkivshchyna party.

From January 2008 to July 2010, she was an Assistant General Director for Public Relations of the Donbassantracite SE. In July 2010, at the Lugansk Regional Reporting Conference, he was elected chairman of the Luhansk Regional Organization of the Fatherland Political Party.

From June 2011 to January 2012, she was the Deputy Board of the Charitable Organization of the New Donbass Foundation in Luhansk.

From May 2013 to March 2014, she was an assistant-consultant of the People's Deputy of Ukraine Yaroslav Fedorchuk of the Batkivshchyna party.

On 17 March 2014, Verihina was appointed the first deputy chairman of the Lugansk Oblast State Amdministration, while serving under Governor Mykhailo Bolotskykh. On 10 May, by decree of the acting president, Oleksander Turchynov, Verihina took over as acting governor of Luhansk Oblast.

By that time, parts of the Luhansk Oblast was controlled by supporters of the self-proclaimed Luhansk People's Republic.

On 15 September, by Decree No. 727/2014 of from the President of Ukraine, Petro Poroshenko, Verihina was dismissed from her duties.

In the parliamentary Eeections in October 2014, she entered the party election list of Batkivschyna party (No. 41), but lost the election.

Two years later after her dismissal, she became one of the institutions of the organization “Power of Law”, which provided legal assistance to the victims during the military conflict, through the judicial recognition of the role of Russia, and has criticized the Minsk agreements.

In 2019, she ran for the Verkhonva Rada on the election list Yulia Tymoshenko Bloc, but also lost the election.
