= Serhii Yermakov =

- Born: March 8, 1950 (age 76); Okhoche, Kharkiv Oblast, Ukrainian SSR, Soviet Union
- Citizenship: Ukraine
- Education: Kharkiv Automobile and Highway Institute
- Scientific career
- Fields: physical education, sports, pedagogy
- Workplaces: H.S. Skovoroda Kharkiv National Pedagogical University
- Thesis: Training technique percussion movements in sport games on the basis of their computer models and modern simulation equipment (in Ukrainian) (1997)

Serhii Sydorovych Yermakov (or Sergii Iermakov; Ukrainian: Сергій Сидорович Єрмаков; born March 8, 1950) is a Ukrainian physical training and sports researcher, Master of Sports in volleyball, Doctor of Pedagogy, full professor, academician of the Academy of Sciences of Ukraine.

== Biography ==
Iermakov was born in the village of Okhoche, Nova Vodolaha district of Kharkiv region. He graduated from Tokmak Mechanical Technical School (1969).

From 1971 to 1977, he attended Kharkiv Automobile and Highway Institute specializing in Automobile Transport, gaining the qualification of a mechanical engineer. He later graduated from Kharkiv State Pedagogical Institute with a degree in Physical Training and the qualification of a physical education teacher (1981).

From 1987 to 1990, he pursued his postgraduate studies at the State Central Institute of Physical Culture (Moscow). He defended his PhD thesis titled “Structure of the Basic Volleyball Techniques as a System of Hitting Movements” (in Russian). PhD in Pedagogy (1991).

Iermakov defended his doctoral thesis “Training technique percussion movements in sport games on the basis of their computer models and modern simulation equipment” (in Ukrainian) at the Thesis Committee of the Ukrainian State University of Physical Education and Sport. Doctor of Pedagogy (1997).

In 2004, the researcher was elected academician of the Academy of Sciences of Ukraine.

=== Sports career ===
As a child, Iermakov played for the village school team. He continued playing volleyball in the technical school. During his military service, he joined the Odessa Sports Club where he engaged in professional volleyball (1969). His first coach was Hryhorii Verkh.

In Kharkiv, he played for the DSK-1 team trained by Volodymyr Ponomarenko. Iermakov was among the first members of the Lokomotiv Volleyball Club (1973).

Master of Sports of the USSR in Volleyball (1975).

As part of the Lokomotiv team, Iermakov became the bronze medalist of the 1978 USSR Championship. He is a multiple champion and prize winner of Ukraine, winner of the Cup of Ukraine, the USSR Cup finalist (1973–1980).

At the age of 30, the athlete retired from sport and started his academic career.

Iermakov participated in national and international volleyball competitions among veterans. He captained Ukraine's National Team of Volleyball Veterans (1992–2002). He is a multiple champion and prize winner of the Cup of Ukraine, World Veteran Champion of 2000 and 2004, Champion of the World Masters Games in Sydney (2009).

=== Professional career ===
From 1980 to 1984, Iermakov worked as a physical education teacher at Kharkiv Secondary School No. 3.

From 1984 to 1994, he was a senior instructor at the Department of Physical Training of the Institute of Railway Transport Engineers.

Since 1994, he has worked at Kharkiv Institute of Design and Fine Arts (now Kharkiv State Academy of Design and Fine Arts). He was previously Head of the Department of Physical Training (since 1994), served as Vice-President for Research and International Relations (since 2001). He is currently a faculty member of the Department of Physical Training.

From 1998 to 2009, he worked as a professor of the Department of Sport Games and Martial Arts at Kharkiv State Academy of Physical Culture.

Iermakov currently works at H. S. Skovoroda Kharkiv National Pedagogical University. He heads the Center for Science Commercialization and Technology Transfer. He is Professor of the Department of Theory and Methods of Physical Education, Recreation and Rehabilitation Physical Training.

The researcher was awarded the title of High Achiever in Education of Ukraine (2001), he is the winner of the regional contest Higher School of Kharkiv Region – the Best Names in 2001 in the nomination “Head of the Department of Physical Training”.

Iermakov was awarded the decoration of the Ministry of Education and Science of Ukraine “For Scientific Achievements” (2006) and the honorary diploma of the Ministry of Education and Science of Ukraine (2007).

== Public activities ==
Iermakov chaired the Expert Council of the Higher Attestation Commission of Ukraine (2006–2010), was a member of the Presidium of the Olympic Academy of Ukraine (2002–2007). He is a member of the Research Coordination Council of the Ministry for Family, Youth and Sports of Ukraine, member of the Research and Methodology Commission of the National Volleyball Federation of Ukraine, academician of the Academy of Sciences of Ukraine.

== Research activities ==
Iermakov's major research areas are movement biomechanics, introduction of new training equipment, computer technologies in sport games.

Iermakov has authored more than 300 academic papers, including the study guides Volleyball: Ukrainian Masters’ Games [Voleibol: igry masterov Ukrainy] (in Russian; 1998), Training Equipment in Volleyball [Trenazhery v voleibole] (in Russian; 1999), Hitting Techniques of Russia’s Best Volleyball Players [Tekhnika udarov luchshikh voleibolistov Rossii] (in Russian; 2000), Techniques of the World’s Best Volleyball Players [Tekhnika igry luchshikh voleibolistov mira] (in Russian; 2001), Volleyball in Kharkiv: 1925-2000 [Voleibol Kharkova: 1925-2000] (in Russian; 2004), Training Equipment in Football [Trenazheri v futbolі] (in Russian; 2005); monographs Computerization of Higher Physical Education: Current State and Perspectives [Informatyzatsiia vyshchoi fizkulturnoi osvity: stan ta perspektyvy] (in Ukrainian; 2012), Medical and Pedagogical Observations of Football Players During Training Sessions [Vrachebno-pedagogicheskie nabliudeniia za futbolistami vo vremia uchebno-trenirovochnykh zaniatii] (in Russian; 2013), System of Modern Technologies for Integrated Development and Health Strengthening of Different Age Groups [Sistema sovremennykh tekhnologii integralnogo razvitiia i ukrepleniia zdorovia liudei raznogo vozrasta] (in Russian; 2017).

The researcher has three inventor's certificates, twelve design patents.

Iermakov is a member of the Doctoral Thesis Committees of H. S. Skovoroda Kharkiv National Pedagogical University and T. H. Shevchenko Chernihiv National Pedagogical University.

He is the editor-in-chief of the academic publications Pedagogics, Psychology, Medical-Biological Problems of Physical Training and Sports and Physical Training of Students, member of the editorial boards of the academic publications Current Issues of Physical Training and Sports, Bulletin of T. H. Shevchenko Chernihiv State Pedagogical University. Series: Physical Training and Sports, Concept of Physical Training and Sports Development in Ukraine, Sloboda Ukraine Research and Sport Bulletin, Theory and Methods of the Physical Education [Teorìâ ta Metodika Fìzičnogo Vihovannâ].
