= Smile, Alchevsk Raion, Luhansk Oblast =

Smile Сміле
- Village
- Interactive map of Smile
- Location of Smile within Ukraine Smile (Ukraine)
- Coordinates: 48.677222°N 38.916667°E
- Country: Ukraine
- Oblast: Luhansk Oblast
- Raion: Alchevsk Raion
- Hromada: Zymohiria urban hromada
- Founded: 1756

Area
  - Total: 1.327 km^{2} (0.512 sq mi)
- Elevation: 108 m (354 ft)

Population (2001 census)
  - Total: 1,031
  - Density: 776.9/km^{2} (2,012/sq mi)
- Time zone: UTC+2 (EET)
  - Summer (DST): UTC+3 (EEST)
- Postal code: 93704
- Area code: +380 6473

Smile (Ukrainian: Сміле; Russian: Смелое) is a village in Zymohiria urban hromada, Alchevsk Raion (district), Luhansk Oblast (region), Ukraine, at about 30 km WNW from the centre of Luhansk.

The settlement was taken under control of pro-Russian forces during the War in Donbass, that started in 2014. The village has remained under pro-Russian control since.
