= Ivanivske, Luhansk Oblast =

Urban locality in Luhansk Oblast, Ukraine

Ivanivske Іванівське
- Rural settlement
- Location of Lotykove within Luhansk Oblast#Location of Lotykove within Ukraine Ivanivske (Ukraine)
- Coordinates: 48°31′30″N 38°55′00″E
- Country: Ukraine
- Oblast: Luhansk Oblast
- Raion: Alchevsk Raion
- Hromada: Zymohiria urban hromada
- Founded: 1918
- Elevation: 184 m (604 ft)

Population (2022)
  - Total: 3,093
- Time zone: UTC+2 (EET)
  - Summer (DST): UTC+3 (EEST)
- Postal code: 93747
- Area code: +380 6473

Ivanivske (Ukrainian: Іванівське), also known as Lotykove (Ukrainian: Лотикове), is a rural settlement in Zymohiria urban hromada, Alchevsk Raion (district), Luhansk Oblast (region), Ukraine. Population: 3,093 (2022 estimate)

== History ==
The settlement was founded in the early 20th century where it was named Ivanovsky Rudnik, then Gustav in 1912 after the entrepreneur.

In 1919, the settlement was renamed to Lotikovo, in memory of the Bolshevik revolutionary Vasiliya Petrovicha Lotikova.

On May 12, 2016, the Verkhovna Rada of Ukraine had de jure renamed the settlement to Ivanivske, but the change is de facto not recognized by the Luhansk People's Republic.

== Demographics ==
Native language distribution as of the Ukrainian Census of 2001:

- Ukrainian: 7.77%
- Russian: 92.06%
- Others 0.03%

== Notable people ==
- Ivan Moiseyevich Kornienko (1920–1945), corporal and Hero of the Soviet Union
