= Rodakove =

Urban locality in Luhansk Oblast, Ukraine

Rodakove Родакове
- Rural settlement
- Location of Rodakove within Luhansk Oblast Location of Rodakove within Ukraine
- Coordinates: 48°33′24″N 39°01′19″E
- Country: Ukraine
- Oblast: Luhansk Oblast
- Raion: Alchevsk Raion
- Hromada: Zymohiria urban hromada
- Founded: 1910
- Elevation: 112 m (367 ft)

Population (2022)
  - Total: 6,099
- Time zone: UTC+2 (EET)
  - Summer (DST): UTC+3 (EEST)
- Postal code: 93743
- Area code: +380 6473

Rodakove (Ukrainian: Родакове) is a rural settlement in Zymohiria urban hromada, Alchevsk Raion (district), Luhansk Oblast (region), Ukraine. Population: 6,099 (2022 estimate)

== Demographics ==
Native language distribution as of the Ukrainian Census of 2001:

- Ukrainian: 40.37%
- Russian: 57.54%
- Others 0.06%
