= Oleksii Kharchenko =

Ukrainian political military commander

- Олексій Харченко
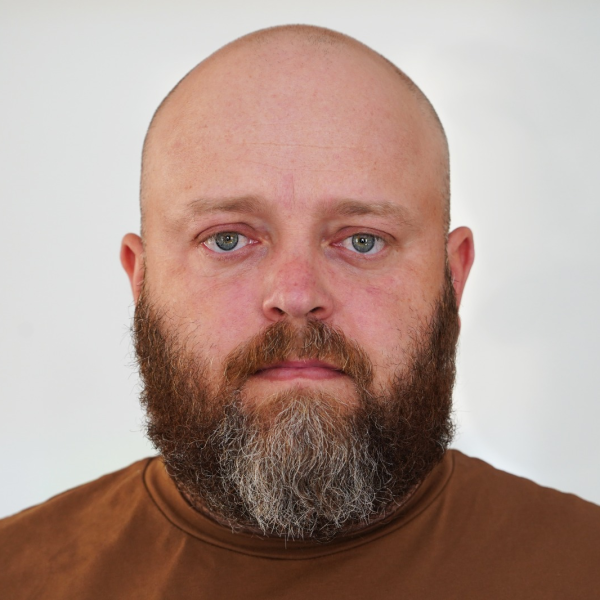
- Kharchenko in 2024

17th Governor of Luhansk Oblast
- Incumbent
- Assumed office 17 April 2025
- President: Volodymyr Zelenskyy
- Preceded by: Artem Lysohor

Head of the Military City Administration of Severodonetsk
- In office 30 September 2024 – 15 April 2025
- Succeeded by: Oleksandr Stryuk

Personal details
- Born: 11 September 1987 (age 38) Chirchiq, Tashkent Region, Uzbek SSR, Soviet Union

Oleksii Andriyovych Kharchenko (Ukrainian: Олексій Андрійович Харченко; born 11 September 1987) is an Uzbek-born Ukrainian political military commander who became the 17th Governor of Luhansk Oblast on 15 April 2025.

He previously served as the Head of the Military City Administration of Severodonetsk from 2024 to 2025.

== Biography ==
Kharchenko was born in Chirchiq, Uzbekistan on 11 September 1987. He has a Ph.D.

He worked in the State Border Service of Ukraine for seven years.

From 2021 to 2023 he worked in the State Inspectorate of Architecture and Urban Planning of Ukraine, as chief specialist, then as head of the Department of State Architectural and Construction Control.

Kharchenko was appointed head of the Severodonetsk city military administration of the Severodonetsk district.

On 15 April 2025, Kharchenko became the 17th Governor of Luhansk Oblast, formally taking office two days later.
