= Yuriy Klymenko =

Ukrainian politician

- Юрій Клименко

Governor of Luhansk Oblast (acting)
- In office 15 July 2015 – 22 July 2015
- Preceded by: Hennadiy Moskal
- Succeeded by: Heorhiy Tuka

Personal details
- Born: Yuriy Yuriyovyvch Klymenko; 31 March 1973 (age 53) Slovyanoserbsk, Ukraine, Soviet Union

Yuriy Yuriyovyvch Klymenko (Ukrainian: Юрій Юрійович Клименко; born on 31 March 1973) is a Ukrainian politician and activist who was the Acting Governor of Luhansk Oblast in 2015. He had served as the deputy head of the Luhansk Regional Civil-Military Administration.

== Biography ==
Yuriy Klymenko was born on 31 March 1973.

In 1995 he graduated from the Luhansk State Pedagogical Institute named after Shevchenko, with being qualified as a teacher of Russian language and literature.

From September 1995 to February 1996, he was a leading specialist of the Luhansk Regional Agroindustrial Joint-Stock Company Agrointer in Luhansk.

Between March 1996 and April 2015, served in the military within the Security Service of Ukraine. In 1997, he graduated from the Academy of Security Service of Ukraine with a degree in law.

In April 2015, he became the Deputy Head of the Luhansk Regional State Administration for Security and Public Order, which eventually transformed the title the Deputy Head of the Luhansk Regional Military-Civil Administration.

On 15 July 2015, Klymenko was appointed as the Governor of Luhansk Oblast, until 22 July, when being replaced by Heorhiy Tuka.
