= Novohryhorivka, Alchevsk Raion, Luhansk Oblast =

Novohryhorivka Новогригорівка
- Village
- Interactive map of Novohryhorivka
- Location of Novohryhorivka within Ukraine Novohryhorivka (Luhansk Oblast)
- Coordinates: 48.639722°N 38.890833°E
- Country: Ukraine
- Oblast: Luhansk Oblast
- Raion: Alchevsk Raion
- Hromada: Zymohiria urban hromada
- Founded: 1970

Area
  - Total: 0.354 km^{2} (0.137 sq mi)
- Elevation: 163 m (535 ft)

Population (2001 census)
  - Total: 42
  - Density: 120/km^{2} (310/sq mi)
- Time zone: UTC+2 (EET)
  - Summer (DST): UTC+3 (EEST)
- Postal code: 93724
- Area code: +380 6473

Novohryhorivka (Ukrainian: Новогригорівка; Russian: Новогригоровка) is a village in Zymohiria urban hromada, Alchevsk Raion (district), Luhansk Oblast (region), Ukraine, at about 32.04 kilometres (19.91 mi) west-northwest (WNW) from the centre of Luhansk city.

The settlement was taken under control of pro-Russian forces during the War in Donbass, that started in 2014.
