= Krasnyi Lyman, Luhansk Oblast =

Krasnyi Lyman Красний Лиман
- Village
- Interactive map of Krasnyi Lyman
- Location of Krasnyi Lyman within Ukraine Krasnyi Lyman (Ukraine)
- Coordinates: 48.721111°N 38.968611°E
- Country: Ukraine
- Oblast: Luhansk Oblast
- Raion: Alchevsk Raion
- Hromada: Zymohiria urban hromada
- Founded: 1960

Area
  - Total: 0.176 km^{2} (0.068 sq mi)
- Elevation: 66 m (217 ft)

Population (2001 census)
  - Total: 101
  - Density: 574/km^{2} (1,490/sq mi)
- Time zone: UTC+2 (EET)
  - Summer (DST): UTC+3 (EEST)
- Postal code: 93704
- Area code: +380 6473

Krasnyi Lyman (Ukrainian: Красний Лиман; Russian: Красный Лиман) is a village in Zymohiria urban hromada, Alchevsk Raion (district), Luhansk Oblast (region), Ukraine, about 30 km NW from Luhansk.

The settlement was taken under control of pro-Russian forces during the War in Donbass that started in 2014.
