= Pryshyb =

Pryshyb Пришиб
- Village
- Interactive map of Pryshyb
- Location of Pryshyb within Luhansk Oblast Pryshyb (Ukraine)
- Coordinates: 48.735833°N 38.926389°E
- Country: Ukraine
- Oblast: Luhansk Oblast
- Raion: Alchevsk Raion
- Hromada: Zymohiria urban hromada
- Founded: 1817

Area
  - Total: 1.682 km^{2} (0.649 sq mi)
- Elevation: 179 m (587 ft)

Population (2001 census)
  - Total: 443
  - Density: 263/km^{2} (682/sq mi)
- Time zone: UTC+2 (EET)
  - Summer (DST): UTC+3 (EEST)
- Postal code: 93704
- Area code: +380 6244

Pryshyb (Ukrainian: Пришиб; Russian: Пришиб) is a village in Zymohiria urban hromada, Alchevsk Raion (district), Luhansk Oblast (region), Ukraine, at about 35 km WNW from the centre of Luhansk city, on the right bank of the Siverskyi Donets river.

The settlement was taken under control of pro-Russian forces during the war in Donbas, that started in 2014.

== Climate ==
Climate data for Pryshyb (1981–2010)
| Month | Jan | Feb | Mar | Apr | May | Jun | Jul | Aug | Sep | Oct | Nov | Dec | Year |
|---|---|---|---|---|---|---|---|---|---|---|---|---|---|
| Mean daily maximum °C (°F) | 0.4 (32.7) | 1.3 (34.3) | 7.3 (45.1) | 15.9 (60.6) | 22.5 (72.5) | 26.1 (79.0) | 28.7 (83.7) | 28.5 (83.3) | 22.6 (72.7) | 15.0 (59.0) | 6.7 (44.1) | 1.7 (35.1) | 14.7 (58.5) |
| Daily mean °C (°F) | −2.7 (27.1) | −2.4 (27.7) | 2.4 (36.3) | 9.9 (49.8) | 16.0 (60.8) | 19.8 (67.6) | 22.2 (72.0) | 21.7 (71.1) | 16.2 (61.2) | 9.6 (49.3) | 2.9 (37.2) | −1.3 (29.7) | 9.5 (49.1) |
| Mean daily minimum °C (°F) | −5.5 (22.1) | −5.5 (22.1) | −1.3 (29.7) | 4.4 (39.9) | 9.6 (49.3) | 13.9 (57.0) | 15.9 (60.6) | 14.9 (58.8) | 10.3 (50.5) | 4.8 (40.6) | −0.2 (31.6) | −4.0 (24.8) | 4.8 (40.6) |
| Average precipitation mm (inches) | 35.7 (1.41) | 33.8 (1.33) | 36.0 (1.42) | 37.1 (1.46) | 42.4 (1.67) | 53.9 (2.12) | 51.5 (2.03) | 34.9 (1.37) | 32.0 (1.26) | 32.1 (1.26) | 43.3 (1.70) | 41.2 (1.62) | 473.9 (18.66) |
| Average precipitation days (≥ 1.0 mm) | 8.2 | 7.0 | 7.3 | 6.8 | 6.5 | 7.2 | 6.0 | 4.0 | 4.7 | 5.3 | 7.2 | 8.0 | 78.2 |
| Average relative humidity (%) | 86.0 | 83.1 | 77.7 | 66.4 | 62.2 | 65.9 | 62.9 | 60.1 | 65.6 | 74.4 | 84.7 | 86.9 | 73.0 |
Source: World Meteorological Organization

== Demographics ==
In 2001 the settlement had 443 inhabitants. Native language as of the Ukrainian Census of 2001:

- Ukrainian — 80.59%
- Russian — 19.41%
