= Sergei Gorenko =

Prosecutor and politician (1982–2022)

Sergei Gorenko Сергій Горенко
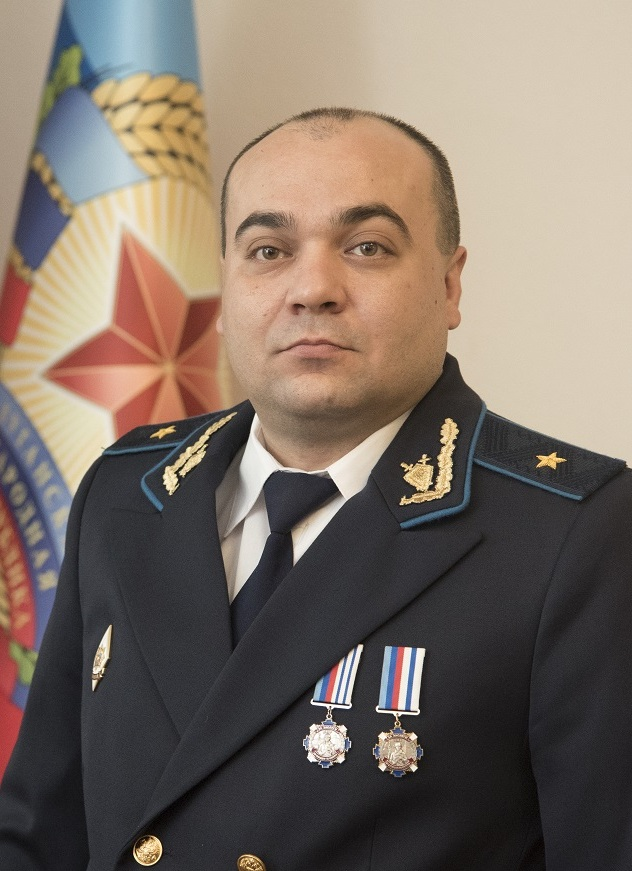
- Gorenko in 2018

Prosecutor General of the Luhansk People's Republic
- In office 22 November 2019 – 16 September 2022

Personal details
- Born: Sergei Sergeyevich Gorenko; 6 April 1982 Sverdlovsk, Luhansk Oblast, Ukrainian SSR, Soviet Union
- Died: 16 September 2022 (aged 40) Luhansk, Ukraine
- Education: Luhansk State University of Internal Affairs; East Ukrainian Volodymyr Dahl National University
- Occupation: Prosecutor

Sergei Sergeyevich Gorenko (Russian: Серге́й Серге́евич Го́ренко, Ukrainian: Сергій Сергійович Горенко; Serhiy Serhiyovych Horenko, 6 April 1982 – 16 September 2022) was a Luhansk native politician of Ukraine and later a prosecutor of the separatist Luhansk People's Republic. He served as Prosecutor General of the Luhansk People's Republic from 2019 to 2022.

== Biography ==
He was born in Dovzhansk in 1982 in Sverdlovsk, Luhansk Oblast. His father was a lieutenant general of the internal service. Gorenko completed his secondary education in Sorokyne, formerly Krasnodon, Luhansk Oblast. In 2003, he graduated from the Luhansk Academy of Internal Affairs and began working as an investigator. From 2003 to 2007, he served in investigative roles. From 2007 Gorenko served in various roles in the Luhansk Chapter of the Ministry of Internal Affairs of Ukraine, before switching to the side of pro-Russian separatists in 2014. In 2015, he graduated from East Ukrainian National University with a master's degree in law, and later in 2020 he achieved another master's in jurisprudence from Kostroma State University. In 2022, through the East Ukrainian National University, he graduated with the degree of Candidate of Sciences.

After defecting, from 2014 to 2015 he served as acting First Deputy Prosecutor General of the Luhansk People's Republic, until 24 February 2015 when he was promoted to First Deputy Prosecutor General. Later, in 2017, he was appointed Acting Prosecutor General, and then by Resolution No. 254-HC on 22 November 2019 he was finally appointed Prosecutor General. He was later sanctioned by the government of Ukraine for threatening the territorial integrity of Ukraine.

Gorenko was killed in an explosion from an improvised explosive device in Luhansk, on 16 September 2022, at the age of 40, alongside his deputy Kateryna Steglenko. The Office of the President of Ukraine claimed this to be the result of a "conflict among criminals".
