= Zymohiria urban hromada =

Zymohiria urban hromada Зимогір'ївська міська громада
- Hromada
- Interactive map of Zymohiria urban hromada
- Country: Ukraine
- Oblast: Luhansk
- Raion: Alchevsk
- Settlements: 22
- Cities: 1
- Rural settlements: 2
- Villages: 15
- Towns: 4

Zymohiria urban hromada (Ukrainian: Зимогір'ївська міська громада) is a hromada of Ukraine, located in Alchevsk Raion, Luhansk Oblast. Its administrative center is the city Zymohiria.

The hromada contains 22 settlements: 1 city (Zymohiria), 6 rural settlements (Ivanivske, Kryvorizhzhya, Lozivskyi, Rodakove, Slovianoserbsk, Yasnodolsk), 15 villages:

- Dovhe
- Hovorukha
- Khoroshe
- Krasnyi Lyman
- Mamusheve
- Novodachne
- Novohryhorivka
- Pakhalivka
- Petrovenky
- Pryshyb
- Smile
- Stepove
- Sukhodil
- Zamostya
- Znamianka

== See also ==
- List of hromadas of Ukraine
