= Mykhailo Bolotskykh =

Ukrainian politician

- Михайло Болотських
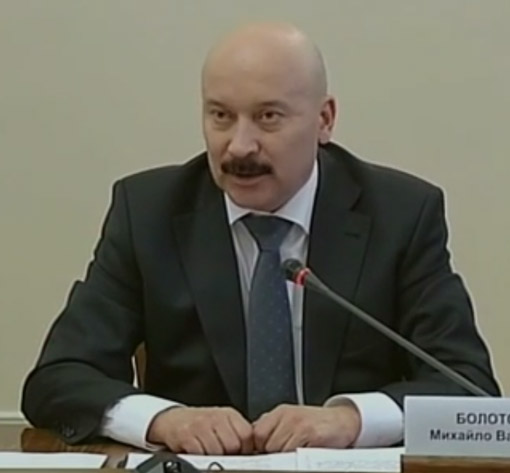
- Bolotskykh in 2014

Governor of Luhansk Oblast
- In office 2 March 2014 – 10 May 2014
- President: Oleksandr Turchynov (acting)
- Preceded by: Volodymyr Prystyuk
- Succeeded by: Iryna Verihina (acting)

Personal details
- Born: 28 October 1960 (age 65) Stary Oskol, Belgorod Oblast, Russian SFSR

Military service
- Allegiance: Soviet Union; Ukraine
- Branch/service: Armed Forces and Civil Defense Troops
- Years of service: 1982–1998
- Rank: Colonel General (2013)

Mykhailo Bolotskykh (Ukrainian: Михайло Васильович Болотських; Russian: Михаил Васильевич Болотских; born 28 October 1960) is a Ukrainian politician and military serviceman, Colonel General (Civil Defense Service). In spring of 2014 he was a governor of Luhansk Oblast.

== Personal life ==
Mykhailo Bolotskykh was born on 28 October 1960 in Stary Oskol, Belgorod Oblast. He graduated from the Kharkiv Armor Commanding College in 1982 and Combat Engineer Institute of the Podillia State Agro-Technical University in 2001.

In 1994–95 took part in peacekeeping missions for Ukraine in Yugoslavia as part of the 240th Separate Special Battalion.

In 2010–12 he was the first deputy of Minister of Emergencies and during some period served as the acting minister in 2010. In 2012–14 Bolotskykh headed the newly reformed State Emergency Service of Ukraine as part of the Ministry of Defense.

== See also ==
- Aleksandr Kharitonov (politician)
