= Eduard Khananov =

Ukrainian politician (1942–2004)

- Едуард Хананов
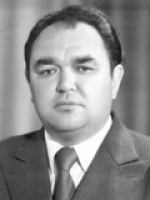

Presidential Representative of Luhansk Oblast
- In office 23 March 1992 – 19 April 1995
- Succeeded by: Petro Kupin

Member of the Verkhovna Rada
- In office 15 May 1990 – 18 June 1992

Chairman of the Executive Committee of Luhansk Oblast Council of People's Deputies
- In office 12 April 1990 – 22 January 1991
- Preceded by: Anatoliy Kasyanov
- Succeeded by: Anatoliy Kasyanov

Personal details
- Born: 9 January 1942 Samarkand, Uzbek SSR, Soviet Union
- Died: 16 June 2004 (aged 62) Luhansk, Ukraine

Eduard Akhatovych Khananov (Ukrainian: Едуард Ахатович Хананов; 9 January 1942 – 19 June 2004) was an Uzbek-born Ukrainian politician who served as the presidential representative of Luhansk Oblast from 1992 to 1995.

Khananov also served as a member of parliament, People's Deputy of Ukraine of the Verkhovna Rada's first convocation, serving from 1990 to 1992. He was a Doctor of Economics.

== Biography ==
Eduard Khananov was born in Samarkand, Uzbek SSR, on 9 January 1942, and is of Russian descent. Between 1958 and 1963 he studied at the Voroshilovsky (Communard) Mining and Metallurgical Institute of Luhansk Oblast, as a building engineer. In 1959, he graduated from the Kommunar Mining and Metallurgical Institute. He graduated from the Academy of Social Sciences at the CPSU Central Committee. In 1963, after his graduation, he became the master, superintendent, and the head of the Verkhnyansky Construction Department of the Lysychanskhimnftobud trust in Luhansk Oblast.

In 1965, Khananov was the 1st secretary of the Lysychansk City Committee of the Komsomol of Ukraine in Luhansk Oblast. From 1971 to 1973, he was the head of the Donetsk Construction Administration of the Lysychanskhimonftobud trust. From 1973 to October 1978, became the 2nd secretary, and from October 1978 to July 1987, he was promoted back to 1st Secretary of the Lysychansk City Committee of the Communist Party of Voroshilovgrad Oblast. In July 1987, he was the 1st deputy chairman of Executive Committee of the Voroshilovgrad (Luhansk) Regional Council of People's Deputies.

On 18 May 1990, Khananov was elected a member of parliament, People's Deputy of Ukraine in the 2nd round, with 59.17% of votes, and 3 applicants, to the Verkhovna Rada. At the same time, on 12 April, Khananov became the chairman of the Executive Committee of the Voroshilovgrad (Luhansk) Regional Council of People's Deputies. Khananov officially took office on 15 May in the Verkhonva Rada. He was a member of the Commission of the Verkhovna Rada for the revival and social development of the villages in Ukraine.

On 22 January 1991, Khananov left as chairman of the Luhansk Oblast council. Khananov officially took office on 15 May in the Verkhonva Rada. He was a member of the Commission of the Verkhovna Rada for the revival and social development of the villages in Ukraine. On 23 March 1992, Khananov was appointed as the presidential representative of Luhansk Oblast., prompting him to leave the Verkhovna Rada on 18 June. On 19 April 1995, he was relieved of his duties, and was replaced by Petro Kupin, in transition of the executive branch of the Luhansk Oblast.

Khananov died in Luhansk on 16 June 2004. He was buried in Lysychansk.

== Family ==
Khananov was married, and had children.
