= Serhiy Haidai =

Ukrainian politician

- Сергій Гайдай
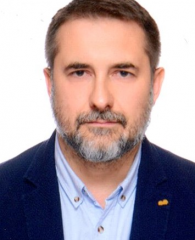

15th Head of the Luhansk Regional Military–Civil Administration
- In office 25 October 2019 – 15 March 2023
- President: Volodymyr Zelenskyy
- Prime Minister: Oleksiy Honcharuk; Denys Shmyhal
- Preceded by: Vitaliy Komarnytskyi
- Succeeded by: Oleksiy Smyrnov (acting)

Personal details
- Born: 6 November 1975 (age 50) Sievierodonetsk, Ukrainian SSR, Soviet Union (now Ukraine)
- Party: Independent
- Education: Khmelnytskyi University of Economics; National Academy for Public Administration under the President of Ukraine
- Occupation: Entrepreneur, politician

Serhiy Volodymyrovych Haidai (Ukrainian: Сергій Володимирович Гайдай; born 6 November 1975) is a Ukrainian entrepreneur and politician. He was the head of the Luhansk Regional Military–Civil Administration from 25 October 2019 to 15 March 2023. He was also previously Head of the State Administration of the Mukachevo District in Zakarpattia Oblast from 2024 to 2025.

== Biography ==
Haidai was born on 6 November 1975 Haidai studied at the Khmelnytskyi University of Economics. He also graduated from the National Academy for Public Administration under the President of Ukraine.

From 2005 to 2015, Haidai was the General Director of Dembud LLC. From 2008 to 2010, he worked as an Assistant Member of the Kyiv City Council. From 2014 to 2015, Haidai worked as an Adviser to the Chairman of the Obukhiv Raion State Administration. In 2015, he was elected a Member of the Mukachevo Raion Council. From 2015 to 2018, he served as Chairman of the Mukachevo Raion State Administration.

During the 2022 Russian invasion of Ukraine, Haidai served as head of the Luhansk Regional Civil-Military Administration.

During the 2022 Battle of Sievierodonetsk, Haidai observed that "The Russians are using their Syrian war tactic in Sievierodonetsk. First, they try to raze a few kilometers of area with air and artillery fire and advance with ground troops. When they gain strength, they retreat, and start shooting with long-range weapons. On the other hand, when they start hitting with cannons, we retreat and then return to our positions."

The Ukrainian Cabinet of Ministers agreed to dismiss Haidai from his position on 14 March 2023, along with the governors of Odesa and Khmelnytskyi oblasts. Haidai was dismissed as Governor by Presidential decree on 15 March 2023.

On 15 March 2024, Haidai was appointed the Head of the State Administration of the Mukachevo District in Zakarpattia Oblast. In August 2025, Haidai was arrested on charges related to a corruption scandal involving inflated state contracts for drones and electronic warfare equipment from 2024 to 2025. In connection to these charges, on 2 August 2025 he was dismissed from his post in the Mukachevo District by Zelenskyy.
