= Lozivskyi =

Urban locality in Luhansk Oblast, Ukraine

Lozivskyi Лозівський
- Rural settlement
- Location of Lozivskyi within Luhansk Oblast#Location of Lozivskyi within Ukraine Lozivskyi (Ukraine)
- Coordinates: 48°33′41″N 38°52′56″E
- Country: Ukraine
- Oblast: Luhansk Oblast
- Raion: Alchevsk Raion
- Hromada: Zymohiria urban hromada
- Founded: 1949
- Elevation: 160 m (520 ft)

Population (2022)
  - Total: 4,804
- Time zone: UTC+2 (EET)
  - Summer (DST): UTC+3 (EEST)
- Postal code: 93746
- Area code: +380 6473

Lozivskyi (Ukrainian: Лозівський) is a rural settlement in Zymohiria urban hromada, Alchevsk Raion (district), Luhansk Oblast (region), Ukraine. Population: 4,804 (2022 estimate)

== Demographics ==
Native language distribution as of the Ukrainian Census of 2001:

- Ukrainian: 24.17%
- Russian: 75.51%
- Others 0.18%
