= Artem Lysohor =

Ukrainian military officer, police officer, and activist

- Артем Лисогор
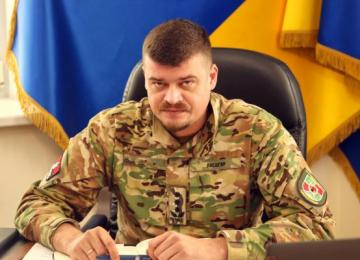
- Lysohor in 2023

16th Governor of Luhansk Oblast
- In office 12 April 2023 – 15 April 2025
- Preceded by: Oleksiy Smyrnov (Acting)
- Succeeded by: Oleksii Kharchenko

Personal details
- Born: 26 April 1983 (age 43) Dnipropetrovsk, Ukrainian SSR, Soviet Union
- Party: Independent

Artem Volodymyrovych Lysohor (Ukrainian: Артем Володимирович Лисогор; born 26 April 1983) is a Ukrainian public and political activist who served as the 16th Governor of Luhansk Oblast from April 2023 to April 2025.

He worked as an investigator of the District Department of the Dnipropetrovsk City Department of the Ministry of Internal Affairs; an inspector of the Professional Training Department of the Personnel Support Department of the Ministry of Internal Affairs; a senior inspector in the public order protection unit of the Main Department of the Ministry of Internal Affairs and led the department for arranging mass events of the same unit. Since 2015, he has been a deputy company commander in the Dnipro-1 Regiment and served as the deputy head of the National Police Department in the Zhytomyr Oblast. On 12 April 2023, according to the Decree of the President of Ukraine, Lysohor was appointed the head of the Luhansk Regional State Administration. He was dismissed on 15 April 2025.
