= Slovianoserbsk =

Urban locality in Luhansk Oblast, Ukraine

Slovianoserbsk Слов'яносербськ
- Rural settlement
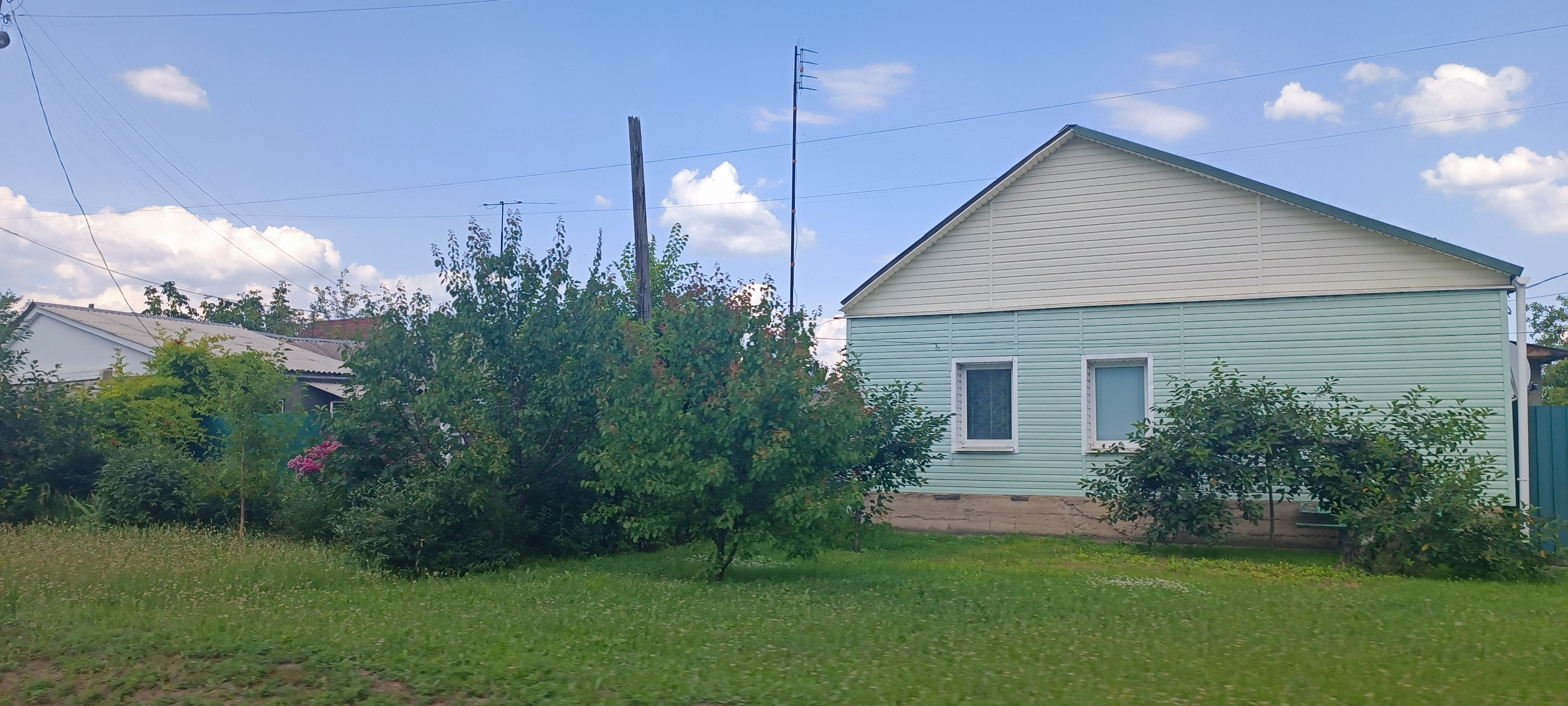

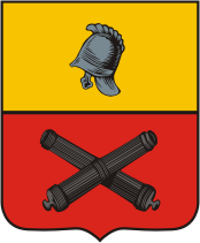
- Coat of arms
- Interactive map of Slovianoserbsk
- Location within Luhansk Oblast Location within Ukraine
- Coordinates: 48°41′47″N 38°58′54″E
- Country: Ukraine
- Oblast: Luhansk Oblast
- Raion: Alchevsk Raion
- Hromada: Zymohiria urban hromada
- Founded: 1753

Population (2022)
  - Total: 7,659
- Area code: (+380)
- Vehicle registration: BB / 13
- Climate: Dfb

Slovianoserbsk (Ukrainian: Слов'яносербськ; or Slavyanoserbsk, Russian: Славяносербск) is a rural settlement in Zymohiria urban hromada, Alchevsk Raion (district), Luhansk Oblast (region), in eastern Ukraine, on the Donets river. Its population is 7,659 (2022 estimate), 8,065 (2013 est.)

== History ==
The settlement was founded by Orthodox Christian settlers from the Balkans as part of the Slavo-Serbia colony in 1753. It was originally a military settlement known as Pidhirne (Ukrainian: Підгірне; Russian: Подгорное, romanized: Podgornoye), its purpose to protect the southern frontier of the Russian Empire from Tatars. It was granted town status in 1784 and renamed to Donetske (Ukrainian: Донецьке; Russian: Донецкое, romanized: Donetskoye). It was the county seat of Donets county from 1764 to 1796.

Plan of Slovianoserbsk, 1817

In 1817, due to frequent floods, the town was moved, and renamed to Slovianoserbsk. Also in 1817 it became again a county seat, and both the town and county were renamed to Slavianoserbsk. In 1870, the town had a population of 3,156. It hosted three annual fairs in the late 19th century.

During the Ukrainian War of Independence, from 1917 to 1920, it passed between various factions. Afterwards, it was administratively part of the Donets Governorate of Ukraine.

A local newspaper has been published in the city since March 1939. During World War II, in 1942–1943, the German occupiers operated a prison in the town. In 1964, Slovianoserbsk received urban-type settlement designation, and in 1966 it became the center of Slovianoserbsk Raion.

Since 2014, Slovianoserbsk has been controlled by the separatist troops of the Luhansk People's Republic and their Russian supporters. In 2020, the Ukrainian government abolished Slovianoserbsk Raion, and now considers the town to be part of Alchevsk Raion. However, the internationally unrecognised Luhansk People's Republic continues to use the pre-2020 administrative divisions of Ukraine.

== Demographics ==
According to the 2001 census in Ukraine, the town had 61.72% Russian speakers and 37.54% Ukrainian speakers.

== People from Slovianoserbsk ==
- Yuriy Klymenko (born 1973), Ukrainian politician
