= Yuriy Harbuz =

Ukrainian politician

- Юрій Гарбуз
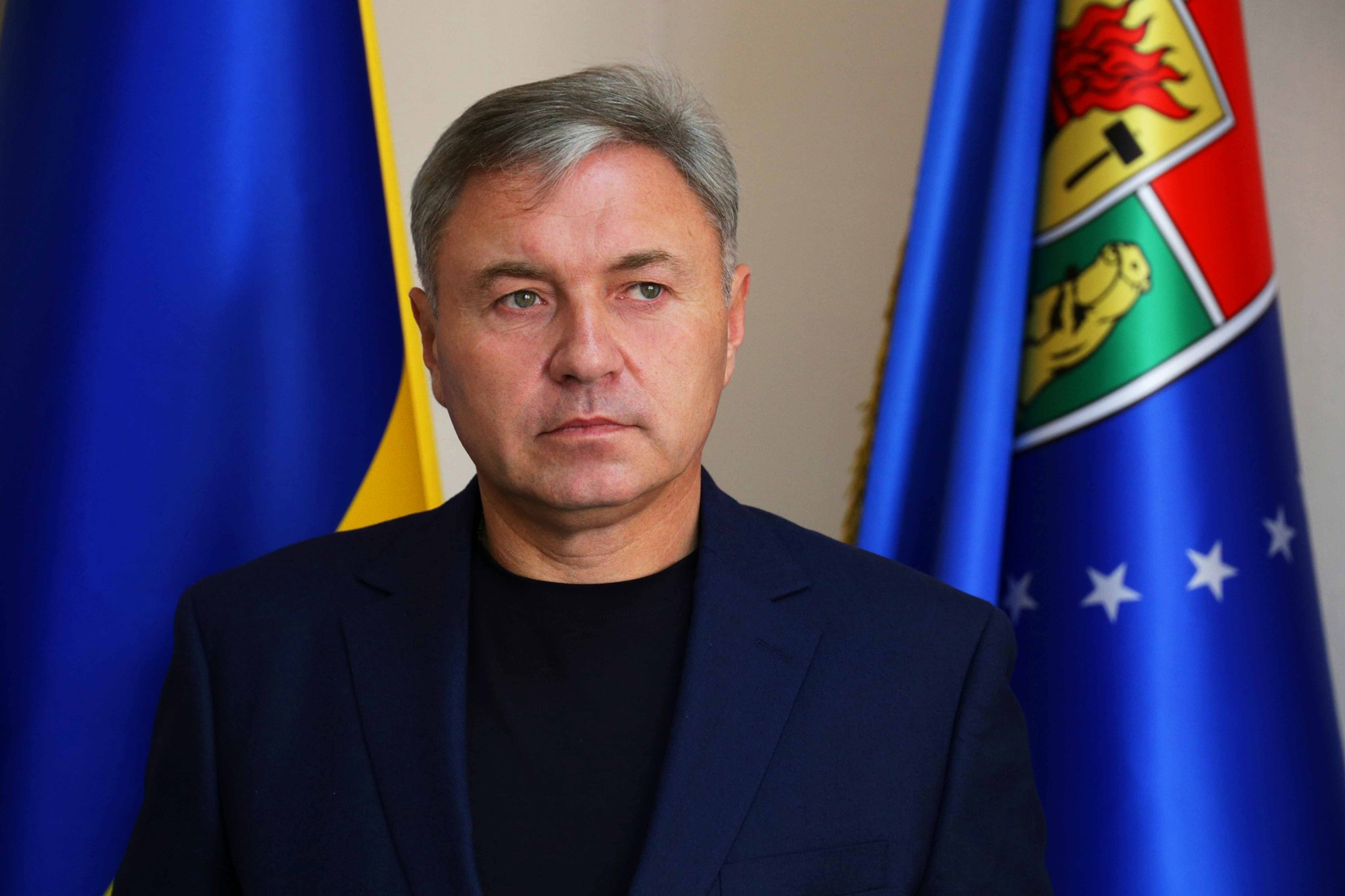

Governor of Luhansk Oblast
- In office 29 April 2016 – 22 November 2018
- Preceded by: Heorhiy Tuka
- Succeeded by: Serhiy Fil (acting)

Member of the Verkhovna Rada
- In office 27 November 2014 – 19 May 2016

Chairman of the Milove District State Administration
- In office January 2014 – April 2014

Personal details
- Born: Yuriy Hryhoriyovych Harbuz; 18 November 1971 (age 54) Milove, Ukrainian SSR, Soviet Union
- Party: Independent; Petro Poroshenko Bloc
- Children: 3

Yuriy Hryhoriyovych Harbuz (Ukrainian: Юрій Григорійович Гарбуз; born on 18 November 1971), is a Ukrainian politician who served as the governor of Luhansk Oblast.

== Early life ==
Yuriy Harbuz was born in Milove on 18 November 1971 in Milove, which was then part of Luhansk Oblast in the Ukrainian SSR. Harbuz, upon graduating from secondary school, did not initially seek higher education and instead became a worker. He first worked as a counselor in 1989 to a secondary school in Dibrova, before completing his mandatory service in the Soviet Armed Forces. He was then a teacher in history at a school in Balka Zhuravka, before founding in 1992 the farm "Garbuz Y.G.", and later in 1993 the Association of Farms "Nadiya". Additionally, in 1999, he founded the "Equestrian Theater", which eventually became a communal enterprise in 2003.

In 2006, he graduated from Luhansk National Agrarian University with a specialty of manager-economist.

== Political career ==
In April 2005, he entered politics, becoming Head of the Markivka Raion State Administration, and in May 2006 he was elected chairman of the Markivka Raion District Council. He resigned from both posts in 2010 upon the expiring of his term, and he returned to heading his farm.

In January 2014, he was appointed chairman of the Milove District State Administration, from which he resigned in April 2014. Additionally, in 2014, he was elected a member of the Milov District Council of the IV convocation. He was also elected during the 2014 Ukrainian parliamentary election to the Verkhovna Rada, the parliament of Ukraine, as a self-nominated non-partisan nominee for constituency no. 114 (Luhansk). Upon joining the Rada, he joined the Petro Poroshenko Bloc faction, a social democratic pro-European bloc. His duties were terminated early in 2016 upon Harbuz being appointed governor, as Ukraine forbids dual mandates.

On April 29, 2016, by the decree of Petro Poroshenko, Harbuz was appointed as Governor of Luhansk Oblast.

== Personal life ==
As of 2018, Harbuz has a girlfriend and has 3 children. In his spare time, he goes out hunting.
