= Governor of Luhansk Oblast =

Chief executive of Luhansk Oblast, Ukraine

Head of the Luhansk Regional Military–Civil Administration
- Seal of Luhansk Oblast
- Incumbent; Oleksii Kharchenko since 15 April 2025
- Term length: Four years
- Inaugural holder: Petro Bogynya; 1938
- Formation: 1938 as Chairman of Executive Committee of Luhansk Oblast
- Website: Government of Luhansk Oblast

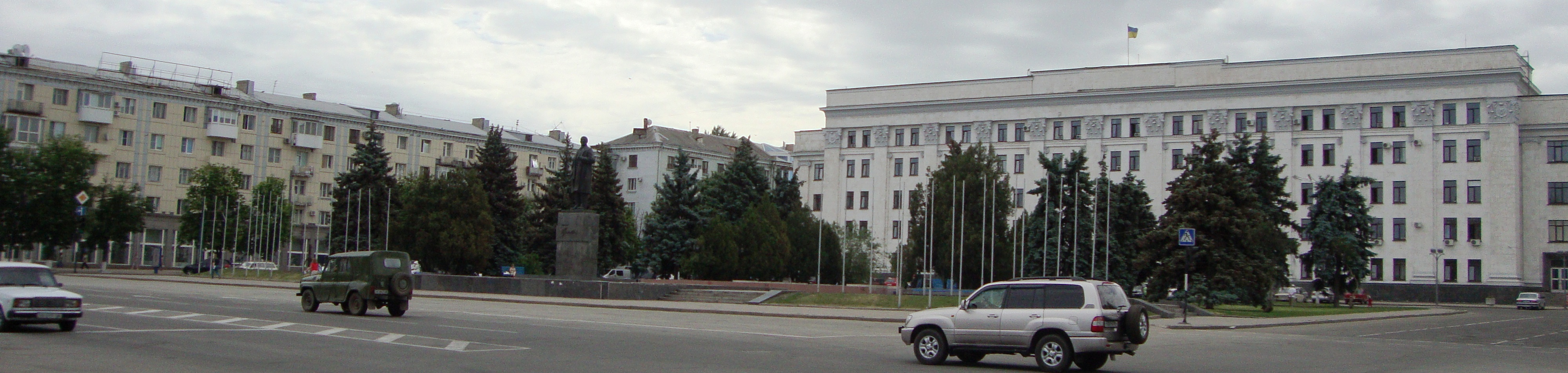
The administrative building in Luhansk at Teatralna Square, prior to the war in Donbas

The governor of Luhansk Oblast is the head of the executive branch for the Luhansk Oblast. Due to the current Russo-Ukrainian War, the administration has been assigned as a civil–military administration since 5 March 2015. As a result, the governor of the Oblast is officially called Head of the Luhansk Regional Military–Civil Administration.

The office of governor is an appointed position, with officeholders being appointed by the president of Ukraine, on recommendation from the prime minister of Ukraine, to serve a four-year term.

The official residence for the governor was originally located in Luhansk until the start of the War in Donbas, when it was then relocated to Sievierodonetsk starting on 5 March 2015. Sievierodonetsk was also captured in 2022 by pro-Russian forces.

== Governors ==
=== Chairman of Executive Committee of Donetsk Oblast ===
For governors of the united region in 1932–38, see Governor of Donetsk Oblast#Chairman of Executive Committee of Donetsk Oblast.

=== Chairman of Executive Committee of Luhansk (Voroshylovhrad) Oblast ===
- Pyotr Bogynya (1938)
- Mykhailo Shevchenko (1938–1942)
- Nazi German occupation (1942–1943)
- Mykhailo Shevchenko (1943)
- Ivan Oreshko (1943–1947)
- ? (1947–1948)
- Stepan Stetsenko (1948–1950)
- Pylyp Reshetnyak (1950–1960)
- Mykola Gureyev (1960–1963)
- Ivan Ivanenko (1963–1964) (Note: For Industry)
- Mykola Davydenko (1963–1964) (Note: For Agriculture)
- Mykola Gureyev (1964–1971)
- Mykola Davydenko (1971–1974)
- Viktor Lysytsyn (1974–1981)
- Albert Merzlenko (1981–1986)
- Rid Zveryev (1986–1987)
- Anatoliy Kasyanov (1987–1990)
- Eduard Khananov (1990–1991)
- Anatoliy Kasyanov (1991–1992)

=== Representative of the President ===
- Eduard Khananov (1992–1994)

=== Chairman of the Executive Committee ===
- Petro Kupin (1994–1995)

=== Heads of the Administration ===
- Petro Kupin (1995)
- Hennadiy Fomenko (1995–1998)
- Oleksandr Yefremov (1998–2005)
- Oleksiy Danilov (2005)
- Hennadiy Moskal (2005–2006)
- Oleksandr Kobityev (2006) (acting)
- Oleksandr Antipov (2006–2010)
- Valeriy Holenko (2010)
- Volodymyr Prystyuk (2010–2014)
- Mykhailo Bolotskykh (2014)
- Iryna Verihina (2014) (acting)
- Hennadiy Moskal (2014–2015)

==== Head of the Regional Military Civil Administration ====
- Yuriy Klymenko (2015)
- Heorhiy Tuka (2015–2016)
- Yuriy Harbuz (29 April 2016 – 22 November 2018)
- Serhiy Fil (22 November 2018 – 5 July 2019) (acting)
- Vitaliy Komarnytskyi (5 July – 25 October 2019)
- Serhiy Haidai (25 October 2019 - 15 March 2023)
- Oleksiy Smyrnov (16 March - 12 April 2023) (acting)
- Artem Lysohor (12 April 2023 - 15 April 2025)
- Oleksii Kharchenko (since 15 April 2025)

== See also ==
- Luhansk Regional Committee of the Communist Party of Ukraine
