= Slovianoserbsk Raion =

Former subdivision of Luhansk Oblast, Ukraine

Slovianoserbsk Raion Слов'яносербський район
- Raion
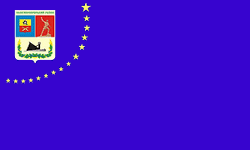
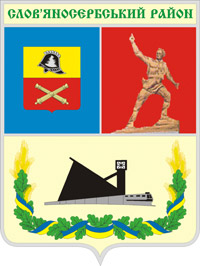
- Flag Coat of arms

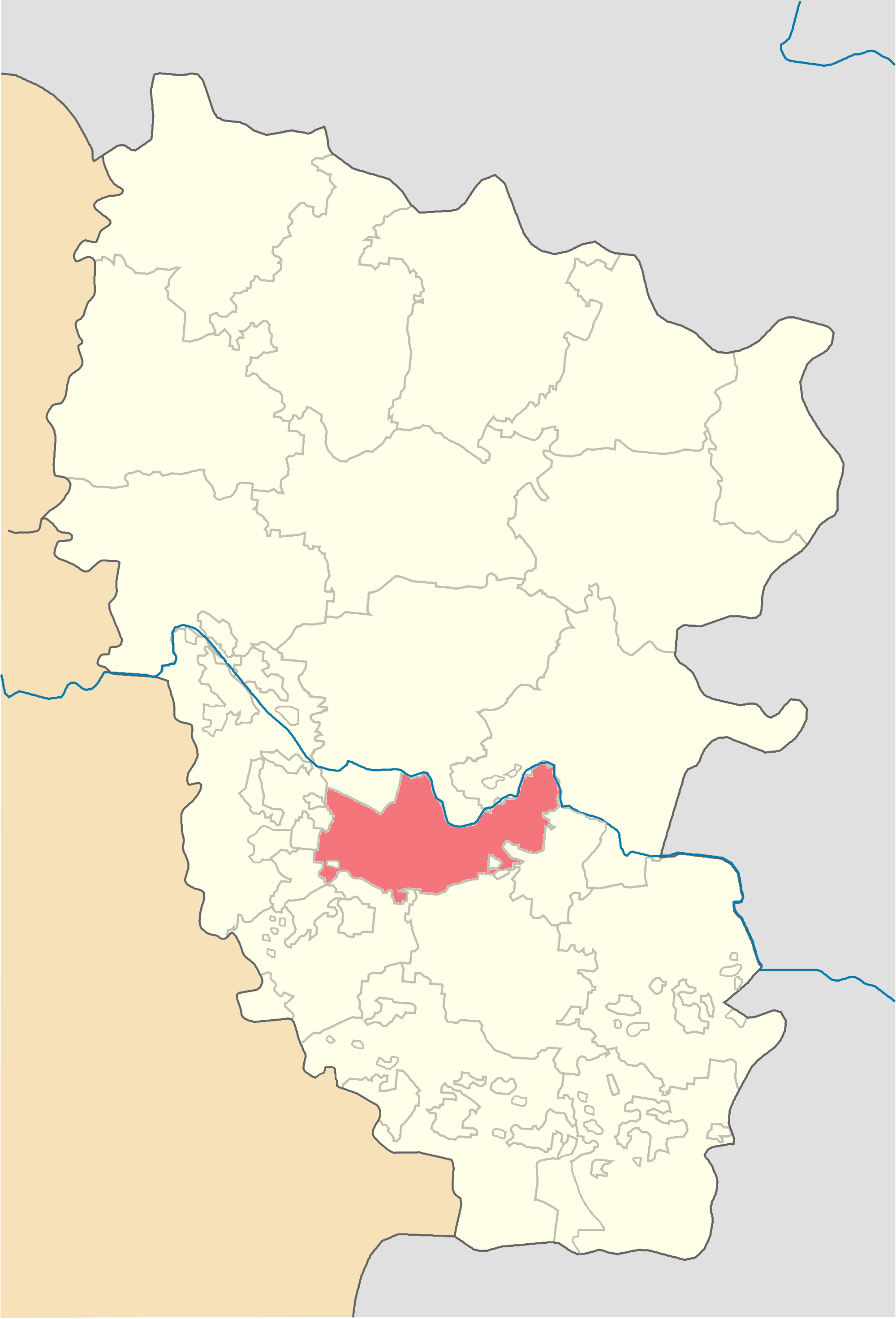
- Coordinates: 48°40′2″N 38°58′40″E
- Country: Ukraine
- Region: Luhansk Oblast
- Established: 1966
- Disestablished: 18 July 2020
- Admin. center: Slovianoserbsk
- Subdivisions: List: 1 — city councils; 5 — settlement councils; 9 — rural councils; Number of localities: 1 — cities; 5 — urban-type settlements; 45 — villages; 4 — rural settlements

Government
  - Governor: Dmytro Sergeev

Area
  - Total: 1,113 km^{2} (430 sq mi)

Population (2020)
  - Total: 48,102 ▼
  - Density: 43.22/km^{2} (111.9/sq mi)
- Time zone: UTC+02:00 (EET)
  - Summer (DST): UTC+03:00 (EEST)
- Postal index: 93700—93747
- Area code: +380 6473
- Website: http://slov.loga.gov.ua

Slavyanoserbsk Municipal District Славяносербский муниципальный округ (Russian)
- District

Other transcription(s)
  - Ukrainian: Слов’яносербський район
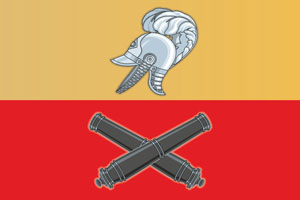
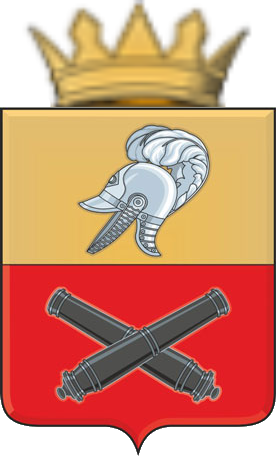
- Flag Coat of arms

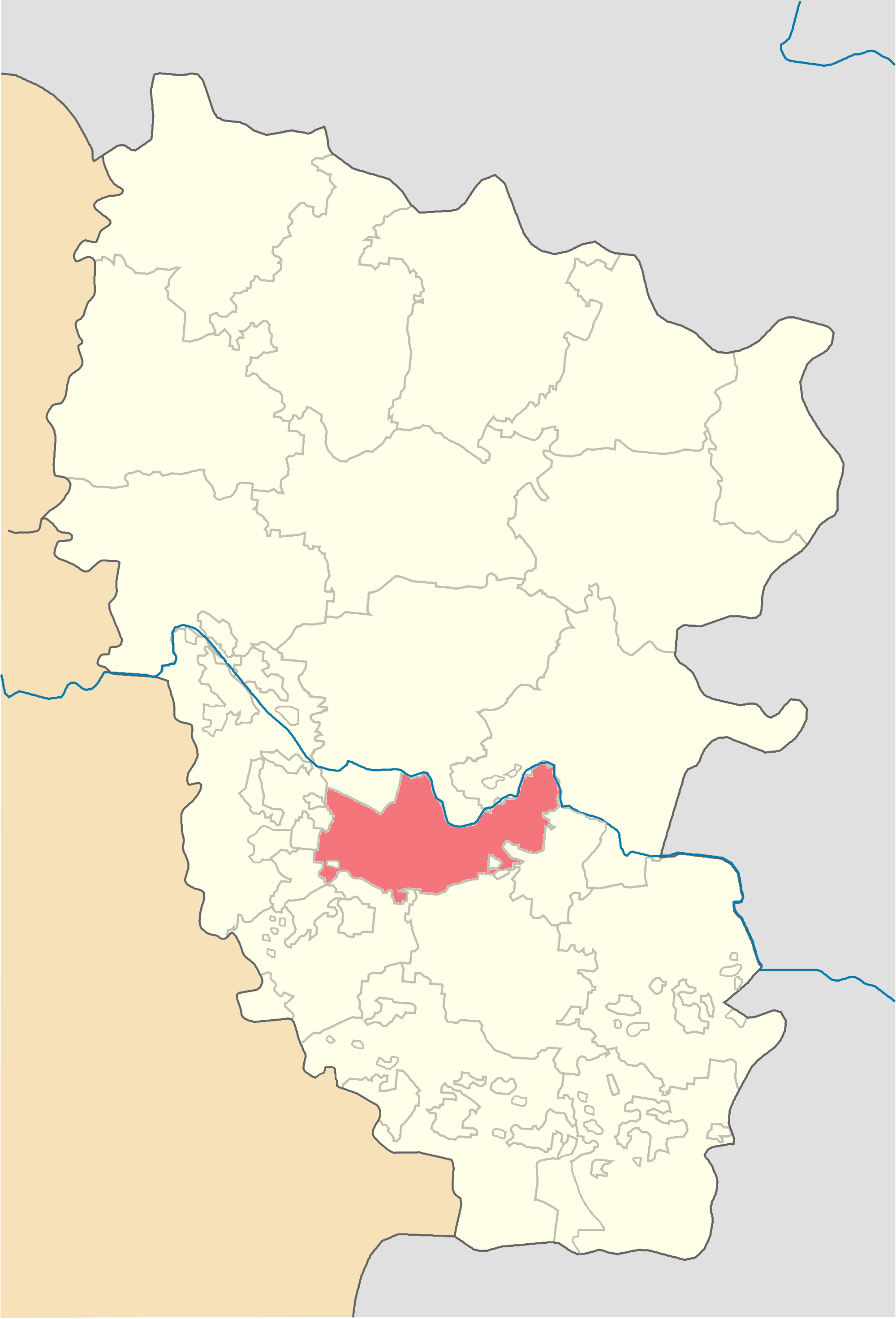
- Location of Slavyanoserbsk District in the Luhansk People's Republic
- Coordinates: 48°40′02″N 38°58′40″E
- Country: Russia
- Federal subject: Luhansk People's Republic
- Established: 1966
- Administrative center: Slavyanoserbsk

Area
  - Total: 1,113 km^{2} (430 sq mi)
- Website: https://slavlnr.su

Slovianoserbsk Raion (Ukrainian: Слов’яносербський район) was a raion (district) in Luhansk Oblast of eastern Ukraine. The raion was abolished on 18 July 2020 as part of the administrative reform of Ukraine, which reduced the number of raions of Luhansk Oblast to eight with the Raion being absorbed into the Luhansk Raion. However, since 2014 the raion was not under control of Ukrainian government and has been part of the Luhansk People's Republic which continues using it as an administrative unit. The administrative center of the raion is the urban-type settlement of Slovianoserbsk. The last estimate of the raion population, reported by the Ukrainian government, was 48,102 (2020 est.).

== History ==
The Raion was established in 1966 under the Soviet Union.

Since 2014, the raion has been controlled by forces of the Luhansk People's Republic. To facilitate the governance of Luhansk Oblast during the War in Donbas, the Verkhovna Rada on 7 October 2014 made some changes in the administrative divisions, so that the localities in the government-controlled areas were grouped into districts. In particular, some areas were transferred from Slovianoserbsk Raion to Novoaidar Raion.

On 18 July 2020 the Raion was abolished as part of the administrative reform of Ukraine, which reduced the number of raions of Luhansk Oblast to eight with the raion being absorbed into Luhansk Raion, however the LPR continued to use the Raion.

After Russia annexed the Luhansk Oblast as the Luhansk People's Republic on 30 September 2023, the Raion was also incorporated into Russia with its pre reform borders and Sergey Kramarenko as its first governor.

== Demographics ==
According to the 2001 census in Ukraine, the town had 61,72% Russian-speakers and 37,54% Ukrainian-speakers.

Ethnicity

- Ukrainians: 65%
- Russians: 32.8%
- Belarusians: 0.7%
