= Luhansk Oblast Council =

Former regional parliament in Ukraine

Type
- Type: Unicameral
- Houses: 1

History
- Established: 1991; 35 years ago
- Disbanded: 14 May 2014; 12 years ago

Leadership
- Speaker: Valeriy Holenko (last)

Structure
- Political groups: Government (106): Party of Regions (106); Opposition (18): Communist Party of Ukraine (13); Strong Ukraine (4); Vacant (1)

Elections
- First election: 26 June 1994
- Last election: 31 October 2010

Meeting place
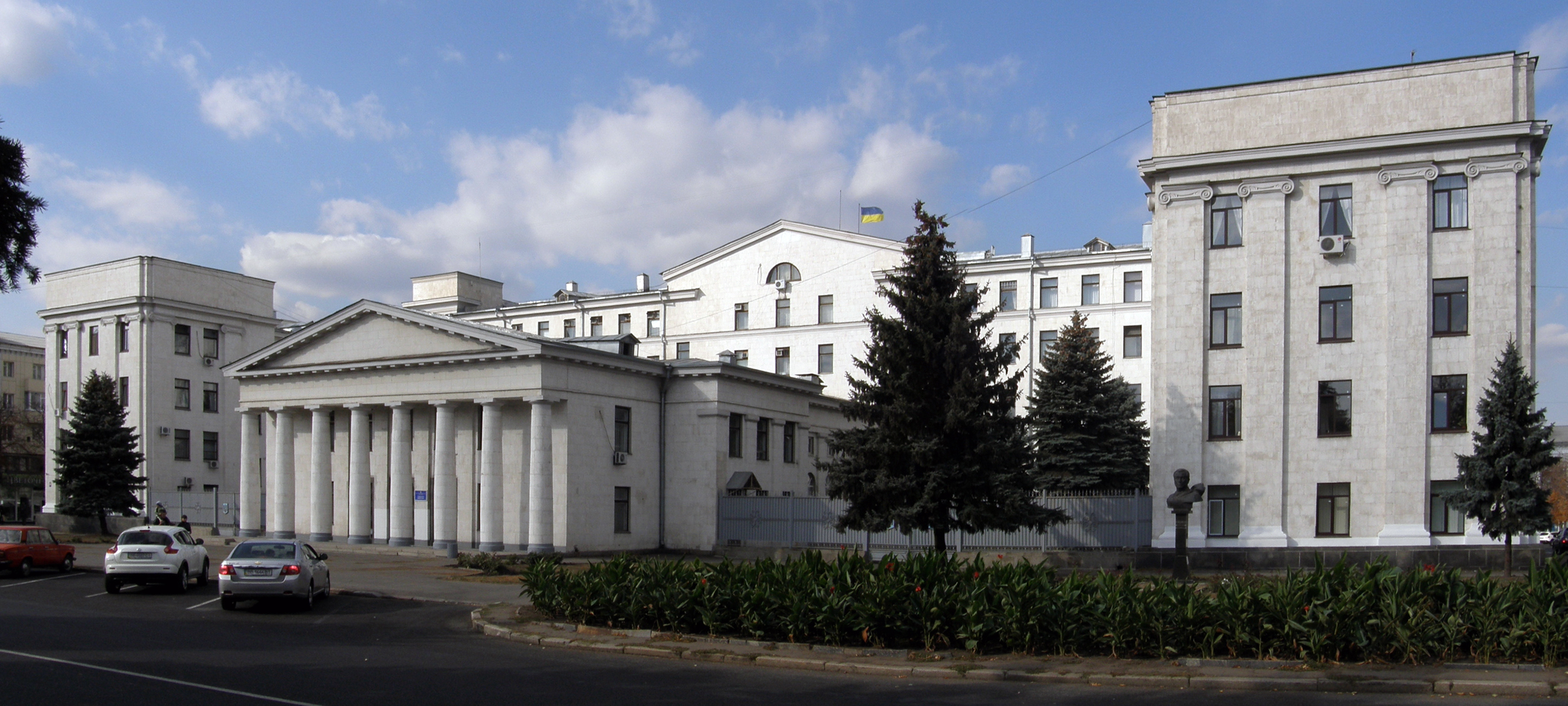
- Luhansk, Luhansk Oblast

Website
- http://oblrada.lg.ua/

The Luhansk Oblast Council (Ukrainian: Луганська обласна рада) is the regional oblast council (parliament) of the Luhansk Oblast (province) located in eastern Ukraine.

In Ukraine Oblast Council members are elected for five year terms. In order to gain representation in the council, a party must gain more than 5 percent of the total vote.

Following the 2014 start of the War in Donbas, elections for the Luhansk Oblast Council have not been held and their functions are currently being performed by a civil–military administration.

The Oblast Council was unilaterally proclaimed to have been disbanded by the Luhansk People's Republic authorities and replaced by the People's Council in 2014, although the Oblast Council still operates de jure as the oblast's parliament in Ukraine.

== Chairmen ==
=== Regional executive committee ===
- Peter Boginia (1938)
- Mikhail Shevchenko (1938–1942)
- Yakov Artyushenko (1943)
- Ivan Orishko (1943–1947)
- Stepan Stetsenko (1948–1950)
- Phillip Reshetnyak (1950–1960)
- Nikolai Gureev (1960–1963)
- Nikolai Davydenko (agrarian, 1963–1964)
- Ivan Ivanenko (industrial, 1963–1964)
- Nikolai Gureev (1964–1971)
- Nikolai Davydenko (1971–1974)
- Viktor Lisitsyn (1974–1981)
- Albert Merzlenko (1981–1986)
- Rid Zverev (1986–1987)
- Anatoliy Kasyanov (1987–1990)
- Eduard Khananov (1990–1991)

=== Regional council ===
- Anatoliy Kasyanov (1990–1994)
- Petro Kupin (1994–1995)
- Leonid Daineko (1996–1998)
- Viktor Tikhonov (1998–2006)
- Valeriy Holenko (2006–2010)
- Volodymyr Prystyuk (2010)
- Valeriy Holenko (2010–2014)
- vacant (2014–present)
