= Petro Kupin =

Ukrainian politician (1946–2018)

- Петро Купін

Governor of Luhansk Oblast
- In office 19 July 1995 – 19 October 1995
- Preceded by: Eduard Khananov
- Succeeded by: Hennadiy Fomenko

Personal details
- Born: 11 July 1946 Artilne, Ukrainian SSR, Soviet Union
- Died: 2 April 2018 (aged 71) Kyiv, Ukraine

Petro Oleksandrovych Kupin (Ukrainian: Петро Олександрович Купін; 11 July 1946 – 2 April 2018) was a Ukrainian politician who served as the governor of Luhansk Oblast in 1995. He also served as the chairman of the Luhansk Oblast Council from 1994 to 1995.

== Biography ==
Petro Kupin was born on 11 July 1946. In 1959, he graduated from the technical collection of metals at the Kharkiv Tractor Plant. He started working at the Kharkiv Tractor Plant as an employee. He served in the Soviet Army. He worked at the Kharkiv Research Physics and Technical Institute. He was then the head of the department, the head of the district of the Kommunarsk Metallurgical Plant in Voroshilovgrad Oblast. He had been a member of the Communist Party of the Soviet Union.

In 1975, Kupin graduated from the Kommunarsk Mining-Metallurgical Institute, Voroshilovgrad Oblast in absentia. Then he was on party work. From December 1991 to July 1994, he was the deputy head of the Luhansk Regional Department of the Ukrainian Fund for Social Protection of Persons with Disabilities. On 10 July 1994, Kupin became the chairman of the Luhansk Oblast Council and the Regional Executive Committee.

On 19 July 1995, Kupin became the governor of Luhansk Oblast. On 19 October 1995, he left office to take over as the Deputy Chairman as the State Customs Committee of Ukraine. In January 1997, he was promoted as the deputy head of the State Customs Service of Ukraine. On 8 June 1998, he left office.

From 2003 to 2008, Kupin was the head of the National Security and Defense Council of Ukraine, subsequently retiring.

Kupin died on 2 April 2018. He was buried in the columbarium of the Baikove Cemetery.
