= Luhansk State University of Internal Affairs =

Ukrainian university in Luhansk

Coordinates: 48.9557°N 38.5009°E

Luhansk State University of Internal Affairs named after E.O.Didorenko
- Луганський державний університет внутрішніх справ імені Едуарда Дідоренка
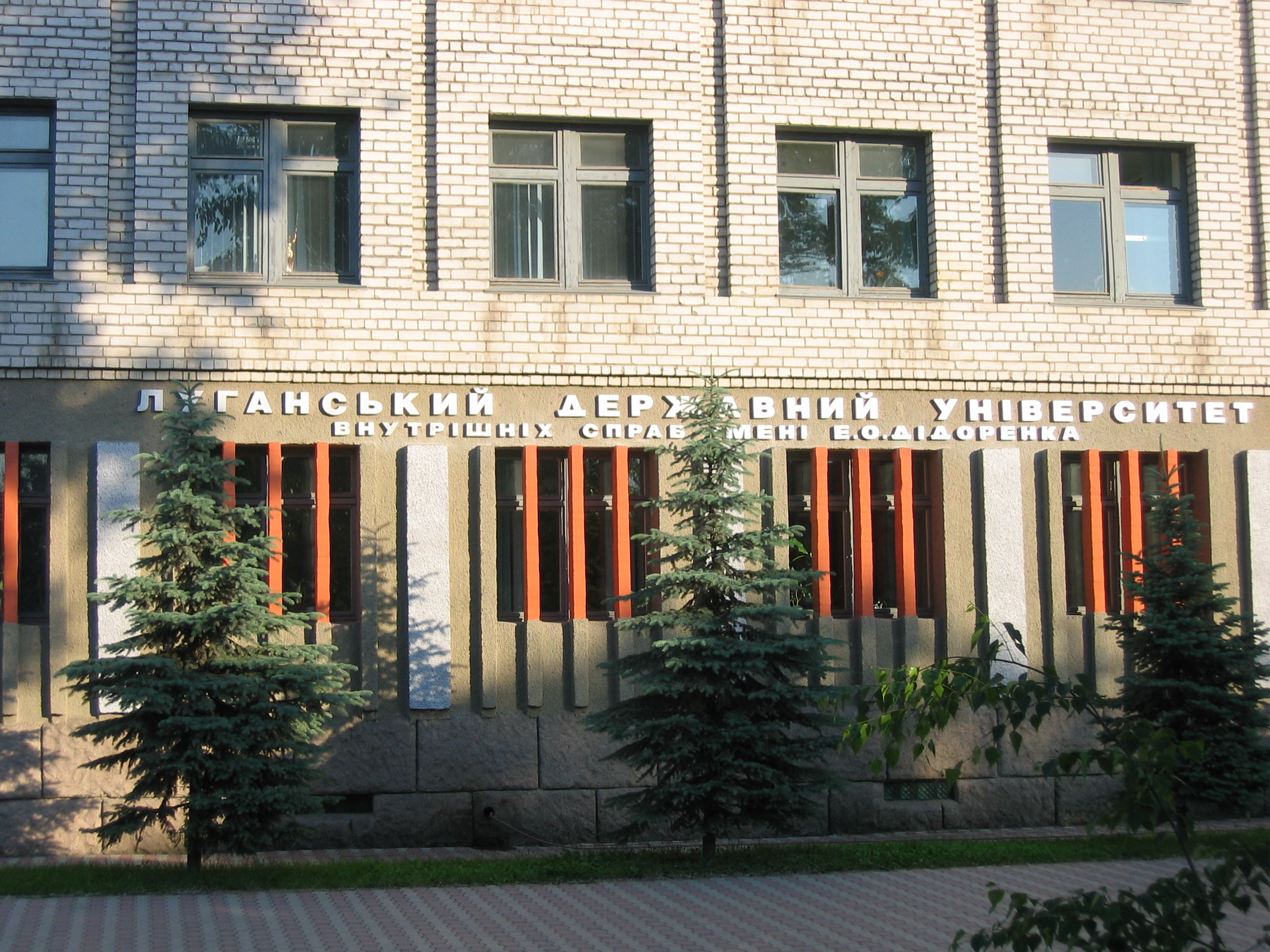
- Motto: DURA LEX SED LEX
- Established: 1993
- Rector: Vitalii Maryanovych Komarnytskyi
- Students: 960
- Location: Luhansk, Ukraine
- Website: www.lduvs.edu.ua

The Luhansk State University of Internal Affairs named after Eduard Didorenko is a Ukrainian university in Luhansk.

== History ==
From the day of its foundation until the day of his death on 1 September 2007 its inalterable rector was corresponding member of the Academy of Law Sciences of Ukraine, Academician of the Academy of the Problems of Security, Defense and Law and Order of Russian Federation, Honored Lawyer of Ukraine, Honored Citizen of Luhansk Colonel General of militia, Professor Eduard Oleksiyovich Didorenko. The university was given the name of its founder on 11 September 2007 by the order 729-p of the Cabinet of Ministers of Ukraine.

Under the direction of E.O. Didorenko the university faculty was formed and strengthened, 80% of the faculty is made of specialists of the highest qualification. The museum of E.O. Didorenko was opened in the university in 2008 and on 1 September each academic platoon and each academic group attends the lesson of virtue and learns more about the history of educational establishment and its founder.

Since 21 September 2007 LSUIA has been headed by the pupil and follower of E.O. Didorenko doctor of law sciences, academician of the International Academy of Production Engineering Science and Practice, Honored Builder of Ukraine Colonel of militia Vitaliy Marianovich Komarnitsky. Under his direction the university continues settled traditions and work, started by the first rector. The scientists of Luhansk State University of Internal Affairs named after E.O. Didorenko make a significant contribution to the improvement of current legislation and law enforcement. The legal scholars of the university have provided 1200 information references and scientific consultations on requests of the Administration of the President of Ukraine, committees of the Verkhovna Rada of Ukraine, Luhansk Regional State Administration and Regional Council, law enforcement and other bodies of executive power. They also carry out scientific research work in applied and basic problems of jurisprudence and investigation and search operations. According to the order of the MIA of Ukraine LSUIA named after E.O. Didorenko is a head educational establishment in specialists’ training for crime detection.

Regular international scientific conferences and workshops on the problems of criminology, criminal law, theory and practice of investigation and search are held at the university. Scientists from Europe and the United States who participate in these events deliver lectures for cadets, students and teachers of LSUIA named after E.O. Didorenko. A lot of sportsmen work and study in LSUIA among them there are three Honored Masters of Sports, 13 Masters of Sports of International Class, 138 Masters of Sports of Ukraine, five Honored Coaches of Ukraine, including the members of the Olympic Team of Ukraine. The representatives of the university have become champions and prize winners of World and European Championships in different kinds of sports more than 149 times, more than 1000 times champions and prize winners of Ukrainian Championships and Roman Mikhalchuk is 13 times World Champion in kettle bell lifting. The national flag of Ukraine was raised in honor of Vyacheslav Glazkov the alumni of LSUIA named after E.O. Didorenko – bronze medalist of XXIX summer Olympic Games in Beijing. LSUIA named after E.O. Didorenko has become a base for a centre of spiritual culture, which includes “Soborna Ukraina” museum, the museum of local history, history of Luhansk militia, the museum of E.O. Didorenko and architectural composition “The Archistratigus Michael’s Chapel and Monument”.

== Campuses and buildings ==
The total area of classes and laboratories of the university is 21251 square meters.

195 educational premises including 13 lecture halls, 10 laboratories, 25 lecture rooms equipped with audio and video aids, 7 computer classes, general library with 2 reading rooms and computer halls, special library (the library holdings of educational and scientific literature are made of more than 200,000 copies), 5 shooting galleries, sports recreation center with 25 meters indoor swimming pool, open-air swimming pool, 5 gyms, a stadium, 9 sports grounds and 3 obstacle courses are used in the course of training. Besides it, dormitory complex includes modern dining hall that seats 1000 people, 3 dormitories for 1650 cadets, medical center with well equipped physiotherapeutic, ENT facilities, dental clinic and isolation ward.

All the departments of the university and rooms in dormitories are provided with free Internet. On the territory of camp of field training the first-year and the second-year cadets study and train to act in emergency situations on the base of real AN 26 plane and railway carriage at the station. The cadets practice special skills in terrorism counteraction, hostages’ situations and methods of drugs search and seizure. Its area is 12 hectares.

== Institutes and faculties ==
The university trains highly qualified specialists for the system of MIA of Ukraine and civil lawyers in the fields "Law" and "Law enforcement" as well as scientific and pedagogical staff in three fields in postgraduate course.

- The departments of criminal militia, criminal investigation, public safety and economic security activities, the faculty of distant education with the tutorial centers in Nikolaev and Lisichansk as well as Training and Scientific Institute of Law, work within the structure of the university.
- The department of criminal militia trains specialists for the divisions of criminal detection, of organized crime and illegal drug circulation counteraction.
- The department of criminal investigation prepares lawyers for criminal investigation and forensic divisions.
- The department of public safety and economic security activities trains specialists for the divisions of economic security activities public safety.
- The faculty of distant education for militia staff trains lawyers for all law enforcement bodies.
- The institute of law trains civilian specialists in jurisprudence for the bodies of judicial authority, internal revenue administration and militia, bodies of internal affairs, notarial system, local self-government and others.

== Honorary doctors and famous alumni ==
- Leonid Kuchma — President of Ukraine (1994–2005)
- Anatoliy Kinakh — Prime Minister of Ukraine (2001–2002, 2002)
- Helmut Kury – European leading criminologist
- Viktor Tikhonov – Chairman of the Luhansk Regional Council (1998–2006)
- Aleksandr Yefremov – Head of Luhansk Regional State Administration (1998–2005)
- Joannicius — Metropolitan of Luhansk and Alchevsk

== Awards and reputation ==
A proof of high social recognition was the honoring of “Crystal Cornucopia” to the university in 2003 according to the results of International rating of popularity and quality “Gold Fortune”, winning the title of laureate of Ukrainian higher educational establishments rating "Sophia of Kiev" (2004—2005), awarding the order of International Personnel Academy “For the Development of Science and Education” (2004) and the Order of the Badge of Honor (2005). The university became the winner of All-Ukrainian project “National Leaders Of Ukraine” in nomination “Education” in 2008, it was recognized as “The Leader of Science and Education of Ukraine” for great contribution to scientific and educational spheres of state construction of Ukraine and contribution to the development of the image of education and science of our country in 2010 and became a laureate of All-Ukrainian publishing project “Scientific-Educational Potential of Ukraine”. Luhansk State University of Internal Affairs named after E.O. Didorenko is in the top ten of the best higher educational establishments of Ukraine according to the results of authoritative rating “Compass” in nomination “In Graduates’ Opinion” in 2010, 2011, and 2012. At the same time according to the rating of Ministry of Education and Science, Youth and Sports of Ukraine the university is in the top five of the best educational establishments of Ukraine in the category “Law, Law Enforcement Activities”.
