= Kharkiv National Automobile and Highway University =

Public university in Kharkiv, Ukraine

Coordinates: 50.0060°N 36.2435°E

- Харківський національний автомобільно-дорожній університет Kharkiv Nationalyi Avtomobilno-Dorozniy Universytet (KhNADU)
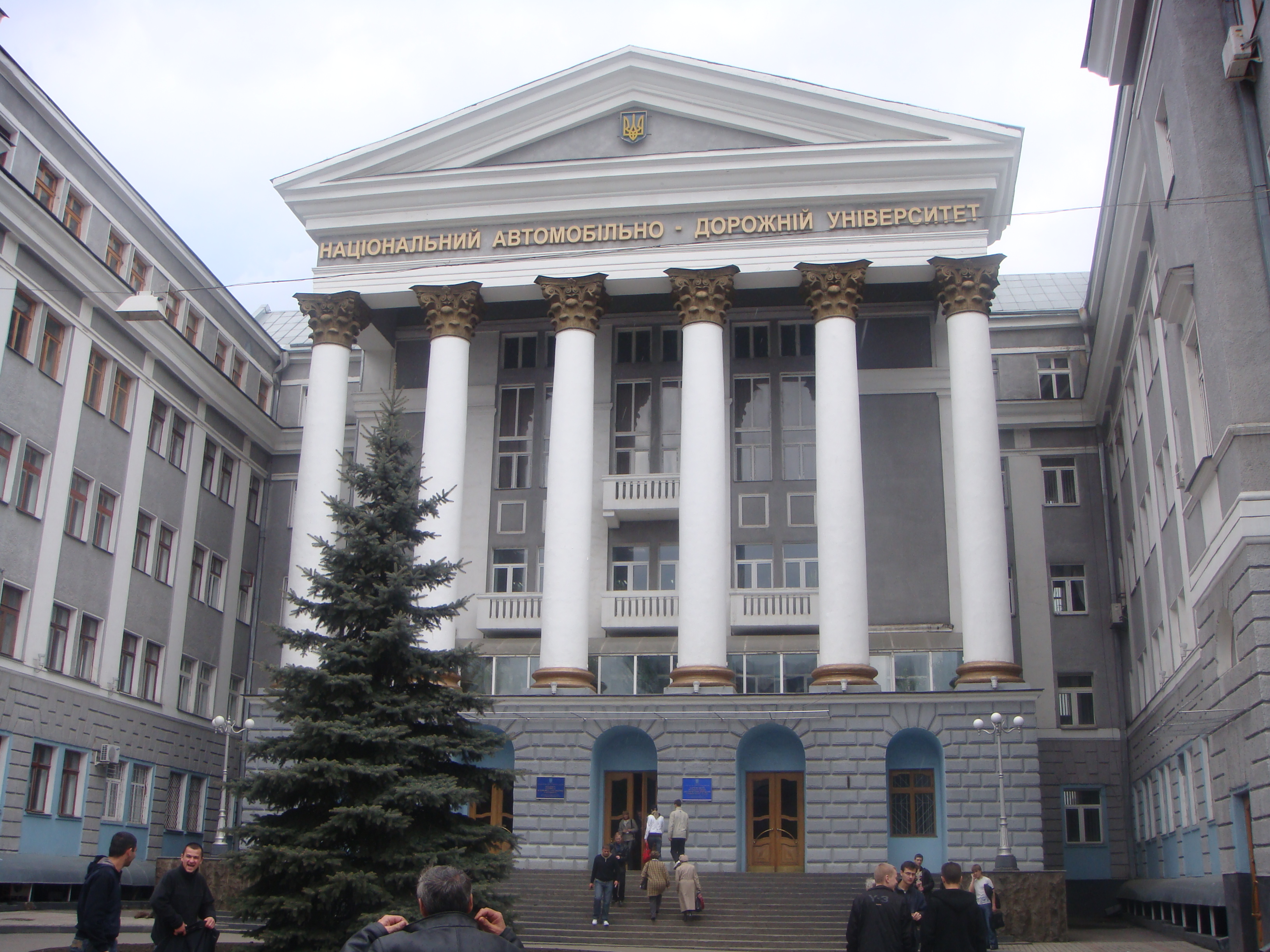
- Building of Kharkiv National Automobile and Highway University
- Established: 1930
- Affiliations: Ministry of Education and Science of Ukraine
- Rector: Anatoliy Turenko
- Students: 8182
- Location: Kharkiv, Ukraine
- Campus: 61002 Yaroslava Mudrogo street, 25
- Website: www.khadi.kharkov.ua

The Kharkiv National Automobile and Highway University is a Ukrainian public university in Kharkiv.

== History ==
- 23 July 1930 – Kharkiv Automobile and Highway Institute (KhADI) was established;
- April 1993 – the higher education establishment is awarded the IV level of accreditation, and it is given a new name as Kharkiv State Automobile and Highway Technical University (KhSAHTU);
- August 2001 – the university is awarded the status of national and it is renamed as Kharkiv National Automobile and Highway University.

== Campuses and buildings ==
- The main teaching and laboratory building.
- Teaching and laboratory building of road construction department.
- Teaching and laboratory building mechanical department and the Faculty of Business and Management.

ground automobile and road machinery.

- Teaching and Laboratory Building Faculty of Mechatronics vehicles, training laboratory diagnosis of motor transport.
- Scientific Library of the University.
- Campus of the University.

== Institutes and faculties ==
- Vehicles (Automobile) Faculty
- Road Construction Department
- Mechanical Engineering Department
- Faculty of Management and Business
- Department of Transport Systems
- Faculty of Mechatronics vehicles
- Department of Foreign Citizens

== Awards and reputation ==
In the rating of Ukrainian universities in terms of employers KhNADU occupies 18th place in technical disciplines

== Alumni ==
The following are the notable alumni of the university:

- Sergii Iermakov — Ukrainian physical training and sports researcher, Master of Sports in volleyball, Doctor of Pedagogy, full professor, academician of the Academy of Sciences of Ukraine

== See also ==
List of universities in Ukraine
