= Volodymyr Medianyk =

Ukrainian politician and businessman (born 1970)

- Володимир Медяник
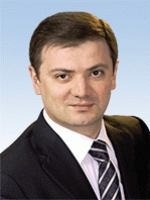
- An official portrait of him from 2012.

People's Deputy of Ukraine
- In office 12 December 2012 – 27 November 2014
- Constituency: Luhansk Oblast, No. 109

Personal details
- Born: Volodymyr Yuriiovych Medianyk; 13 June 1970 (age 56) Voroshilovgrad, Ukrainian SSR, Soviet Union (now Luhansk, Ukraine)
- Party: Our Ukraine(2002-06); Independent (2006-2010); Communist Party of Ukraine (2010-2012); Party of Regions (2012-14)
- Education: East Ukrainian National University (1990, 2001); Donetsk National University of Economics and Trade named after M. Tugan-Baranovsky (1994)

Volodymyr Yuriiovych Medianyk (Ukrainian: Володимир Юрійович Медяник; born 13 June 1970) is a Ukrainian politician and businessman who served as a People's Deputy of Ukraine in the Verkhovna Rada representing the 7th convocation from 2012 to its premature end in 2014 with the Party of Regions. Previously, Medianyk was a long-time politician in the city of Luhansk, as he served as a deputy on the Luhansk City Council from 2002–06 and from 2010–12, during which time he was affiliated with Our Ukraine and later the Communist Party of Ukraine. As a businessman, he was also the director of multiple enterprises within Luhansk, and owned multiple supermarket chains and buildings within the city. In 2016, he was briefly arrested by the Prosecutor General's Office of Ukraine and held by the Security Service of Ukraine (SBU) in a pre-trial centre in Kyiv on charges of cooperating with the Luhansk People's Republic, but his case was eventually dropped.

== Early life ==
Medianyk was born on 13 June 1970 in the city of Voroshilovgrad, which was then part of the Ukrainian SSR in the Soviet Union. After graduating from secondary school, he immediately pursued higher education, attending the East Ukrainian National University (which was then known as the Voroshilovgrad Machine-Building Institute) starting in 1987. However, he soon after paused his studies, and did his mandatory service in the Soviet Army from 1988-89. Upon returning to Ukraine, he continued attending the institute within the Faculty of Transport Engineering, graduating in 1990. After graduation, he returned to school and started attending the Donetsk National University of Economics and Trade named after M. Tugan-Baranovsky, where he graduated from in 1994 with a specialisation as an economist and manager. Meanwhile, he also started his business career, as starting in 1992 he was appointed Head of the Department of Economics for the enterprise "TradeImpex" in the now independent Ukraine.

Later on in 2001, he also graduated from his alma mater, East Ukrainian National University, with a Candidate of Sciences degree on the subject "compensatory capabilities of small and medium-sized business enterprises".

== Business career ==
In 1994, he was promoted to general director of TradeImpex, and simultaneously, he also became general director of the construction company "Linton" that year. After leaving both in 1996, he was appointed CEO of PKF Elektra LLC. He was also simultaneously appointed CEO of the JSC "Rossiya" in 2001, although he left both enterprises in 2006 to become general director of "Terra". Medianyk was also later appointed a member of the supervisory board of "Luhanskpechat".

In 2010, Medianyk opened up the social store "Prodtog" in Luhansk, which was a specialised market that would offer below-market prices for privileged citizens (such as pensioners, war veterans, and the disabled). The first store in Luhansk was later relocated to 43 Sovetskaya Street, opposite the Worker of the Luhansk Region monument. Previously, he had launched such stores in Kypuche and the Novobavarskyi District in Kharkiv. Other construction that he has been involved with is the Mandarian supermarket chain in Luhansk, the "Kashstan-Electronics" chain, and the retail and office complex "Luhansk City Centre". He has also owned, since the early 2000s, 50% of UMH (Ukrainian Media Holding), which is Luhansk Oblast's largest operator in the publishing sector. After 2014, all shopping centres he owned in Luhansk continued to operate there.

== Political career ==
=== 2002-2012: Early career in Luhansk ===
Starting in 2002, he was elected as a deputy to the Luhansk City Council. At the time of his election, he was affiliated with the Our Ukraine party. While serving as a deputy, he was appointed chairman of the Our Ukraine branch in 2005. In mid-2005, he confirmed he was running for the post of Mayor of Luhansk during the 2006 Ukrainian local elections, and would not run for re-election in the council. However, controversially, his media campaigns, such as in newspapers and on TV for Luhansk, never identified him as affiliated with Our Ukraine or the "orange" branding. Instead, he ran a personalised PR campaign promoting himself that was considered highly-polished, positioning himself as a funder of children's playgrounds and promising investment in Luhansk. According to local media outlets at the time, the decision was deliberate because Our Ukraine was not popular in Luhansk at the time, as most supported the Party of Regions. His non-affilitation with Our Ukraine and commercials caused friction with the regional party leadership for Our Ukraine in 2005, such as with Andrii Nedovesov. Eventually, in early 2006, just before the race's end, he left Our Ukraine. It was speculated that he left the party to run as an independent in an attempt to distance himself from the party and its affiliation with the Orange Revolution. In the end, though, he finished fourth during the race with 6.56% of the vote, being beaten out by the Party of Regions candidate Serhiy Kravchenko, who won in a landslide.

For the next few years, Medianyk would stray from politics until he announced he would be running again for a seat in the Luhansk City Council during the 2010 Ukrainian local elections as a member of the Communist Party of Ukraine (CPU). He was placed at No. 2 on the CPU's party list for the 2010 election to the Luhansk City Council. However, Medianyk was eventually removed from registration by the Electoral Commission for Luhansk in October. His candidacy was revoked because of an anonymous campaign flyer lacking printing house details, which was alleged to constitute "illegal campaigning". Later that day, though, the Central Election Commission of Ukraine (CEC) cancelled the decision of the Election Commission of Luhansk. Spiridon Kilinkarov, the CPU's top candidate in Luhansk, said he intended to file a complaint with the Prosecutor General's Office of Ukraine over the incident. After his candidacy was restored, he was indeed elected to the council again. Afterwards, it was reported that the CPU intended to nominate him for the post of secretary of the city council, but decided against it. In the end, the CPU nominated him for the post of Chairman of the Budget Commission, although Kravchenko stated that it was likely it would not go through since Medianyk was not favoured by the Party of Regions. In late November, he was eventually elected Chairman of the Standing Committee on Socio-Economic Development, Budget, and Finance, with the sole vote against him being from a pro-European Front for Change deputy. In late December 2012, Medianyk requested the termination of his powers in the Luhansk City Council in connection with being elected to the Verkhovna Rada, with Serhii Shakhov (Party of Regions) taking over his heading of the committee.

=== 2012-2014: Verkhovna Rada ===
During the 2012 Ukrainian parliamentary elections, Medianyk announced his candidacy for the single-mandate constituency No. 109 with the Party of Regions, after defecting from the CPU. At its formation in 2012, No. 109 consisted of the city of Krasnodon, parts of the Krasnodon Raion, and parts of the city of Luhansk (Leninskyi District). During the pre-election campaign, he distributed "easter food packages" to pensioners in the Leninskyi district, which was denounced by OPORA. He was later also accused of bribery by Batkivshchyna for having tents labeled "Prodtorg" (a chain store in Luhansk he owned) with free food rations at polling stations. Medianyk also famously said he would sue the movement CHESNO after they claimed he drove a Bentley around Luhansk, but did not put it on his declarations or on the CEC. Despite these controversies, he won with 44.8% (42,553 people) of the vote in the district, with the self-nominated Alexander Makarov trailing behind him at 14.26% and CPU candidate Mykola Reznik taking third place at 11.57% of the vote.

Upon being elected to the Rada, he immediately joined the Party of Regions faction in the parliament and was appointed as a member of the Committee on Fuel and Energy Complex, Nuclear Policy, and Nuclear Safety. During his time in the Rada, he was frequently accused of button pushing by CHESNO and by Batkivschyna leader Arseniy Yatsenyuk. After Yatsenyuk accused him of this practice, Medianyk publicly demanded an apology from him, and he said that he had asked to be given the floor to address the allegations but was blocked by the opposition. During the consideration of the European integration bills, he was one of six deputies from Luhansk Oblast that were absent. He subsequently did not vote on the resolution condemning the killing of protestors known as the Heavenly Hundred during Euromaidan in February 2014.

Gradually, the situation in Ukraine worsened, and the pro-Russian, separatist Luhansk People's Republic (LPR/LNR) was created, which seized the Security Service of Ukraine (SBU) building in Luhansk. On 7 April 2014, it was announced that Medianyk would meet with the militants of the LPR, and afterwards he reported the militants' demands to the Ukrainian government. In June 2014, he joined the parliamentary faction "For Peace and Stability", which was widely described as a pro-Russian faction. In September 2014, towards the end of his mandate, due to the premature end of the 7th convocation, he was accused by Oleksandr Turchynov, the Chairman of the Verkhovna Rada, of separatism and support for Russia for his participation in "For Peace and Stability". He chose not to run for re-election in the snap 2014 Ukrainian parliamentary elections, and thereafter retired from politics.

== Personal life ==
He is married and has two daughters: Alina (born in 1994) and Carolina (born in 2000).

=== Legal issues ===
On 6 August 2016, Medianyk was detained by the Prosecutor General's Office of Ukraine and charged with deliberate actions to change the borders of Ukraine and with providing assistance to the LPR. This came amid an investigation into Oleksandr Yefremov, the former head of the Party of Regions faction in the Verkhovna Rada. Medianyk was initially arrested for a period of two months by the Pecherskyi District Court of Kyiv without the right to bail. On 1 October, his arrest was extended for another two months, after which Medianyk announced he would go on a hunger strike unless he was able to conduct a simultaneous interrogation with other MPs who were arrested, like Landyk and Ivanov. A few days later, on 14 October, the request was granted and Medianyk and Landyk were allowed to be simultaneously cross-examined. During interrogations, former MP Volodymyr Landyk said that Medianyk was part of Yrefremov's core political circle after 2012, and that he may or may not have known that the Russians would assist the LPR in the capture of Luhansk Oblast in 2014. However, Landyk also said that he did not "hear or see" Medianyk committing specific actions that supported the LPR.

A week later, on 22 October 2016, it was confirmed that Medianyk would probably be released in the near future due to there not being enough evidence. Andriy Parubiy, the Chairman of the Verkhovna Rada, said he supported Yuriy Lutsenko's statements on Medianyk's possible release. Parubiy said that Medianyk had sided with Ukraine continuously since 2014, and that during the negotiations at the SBU in Luhansk in April 2014, Medianyk had supported the side of Ukraine against the militants. In addition, Parubiy pointed to Medianyk helping a Ukrainian journalist be released from the militants' captivity. In line with the previous positions, on 24 October 2016, the SBU pre-trial centre in Kyiv released him. They also dropped all suspicions against him while the Prosecutor General's Office of Ukraine dropped all criminal proceedings also. Soon after being released, in December, he announced he was filing lawsuits in the European Court of Human Rights for one hryvnia in moral compensation for his time spent at the detention centre. According to Medianyk, he was kept without drinking water, and he was also threatened with a longer stay in the centre if he refused to testify. Medianyk said he was eventually forced to testify against Yuriy Boyko, Serhiy Dunaiev, and Yefremov. Three years later, in 2019, the Supreme Court of Ukraine ruled that Medianyk could be paid 9,600 hryvnias for moral damages.
