= Valeriy Holenko =

Ukrainian politician (born 1958)

- Валерій Голенко
- Holenko in 2014.

Governor of Luhansk Oblast
- In office 18 March 2010 – 10 November 2010
- President: Viktor Yanukovych
- Preceded by: Oleksandr Antipov
- Succeeded by: Volodymyr Prystyuk

Chairman of the Luhansk Oblast Council
- In office 2006–2010
- Preceded by: Viktor Tikhonov
- Succeeded by: Volodymyr Prystyuk
- In office 2010–2014
- Preceded by: Volodymyr Prystyuk
- Succeeded by: vacant

Personal details
- Born: Valeriy Mykolayovych Holenko; 6 May 1958 (age 68) Millerovo, Russian SFSR, Soviet Union (now Russia)
- Party: Party of Regions
- Spouse: Halyna Mykolaivna
- Education: National Aviation University; East Ukrainian National University; National Academy for Public Administration

Valeriy Mykolayovych Holenko (Ukrainian: Валерій Голенко; born 6 May 1958) is a Russian-Ukrainian politician who served as Governor of Luhansk Oblast from March to November 2010. Prior to becoming governor, Holenko also served as Chairman of the Luhansk Oblast Council from 2006 to March 2010, which he also did afterwards from November 2010 to 2014. After Euromaidan, Holenko sided with the Luhansk People's Republic, and later fled to Russia after criminal proceedings of treason were opened against him.

== Early life ==
Holenko was born on 6 May 1958 in the city of Millerovo, which was then part of the Russian SFSR in the Soviet Union. He is ethnically Russian and was born to Mykola and Raisa Mykolaivna. After immigrating to the Ukrainian SSR, he graduated from the National Aviation University in Kyiv in 1981 with a degree in air transport operations. He then moved to Luhansk (then Voroshilovgrad) to work in the Voroshilovgrad United Air Squadron, and became secretary of the Komsomol for the squadron. Holenko was then transferred to become head of the Komsomol for the Leninskyi District of Voroshilovgrad.

== Political career ==
In 1984, Holenko became Deputy Head of the Regional Committee Komsomol of Voroshilovgrad, which he did for three years. In his last role before the collapse of the Soviet Union, he served as First Secretary of the Regional Committee Komsomol of Voroshilovgrad. After the collapse, he left high-level politics and became director of SPE "Factor" and later Geko-Invest LLC. However, he still served as a deputy of the Luhansk City Council, which he had been doing since 1987, until he resigned in 1994. During this time, he also graduated from East Ukrainian National University in 1992 with a degree as an engineer-economist, with a thesis specialising in the industry of mechanical engineering. Holenko returned to high-level politics in 1996, becoming an assistant to the First Deputy of Luhansk Oblast. He served in this role for a year before briefly working as First Deputy General Director of the Luhansk Energy Company. He quit this in 1998, returning to politics as a deputy of the Luhansk Oblast Council for the Party of Regions, and was also elected deputy chairman of the council that same year.

In 2006, he was promoted to Chairman of the Luhansk Oblast Council, which he did for four years. In January 2010, Holenko notably appealed against the awarding of the title of Hero of Ukraine to Stepan Bandera, who headed the Organisation of Ukrainian Nationalists. He resigned from the mandate when he was briefly appointed as Governor of Luhansk Oblast from March 2010 to November 2010 by decree of President Viktor Yanukovych. It was said he was dismissed so early because of Yanukovych's dissatisfaction with the election for Mayor of Luhansk, in part, because Serhiy Kavchenko almost lost the election to Spiridon Kilinkarov, who had accused the ruling Party of Regions of falsification. Another reason given was the conflict between the groups of Oleksandr Yefremov and Viktor Tikhonov. After his dismissal in November 2010, he returned to being Chairman of the Luhansk Oblast Council.

=== War in the Donbas ===
Holenko speaking during a pro-Russian rally in Luhansk in 2014.

Following the events of Euromaidan, Holenko spoke during a congress of deputies of the Party of Regions that was called in February 2014, in which he called for a "maximum decentralisation of power". After the subsequent formation of the First Yatsenyuk government, Holenko also spoke at a pro-Russian rally in Luhansk, where he read the resolution of the Luhansk Oblast Council that declared the government illegitimate and he promised to seek military assistance from Russia. After the formation of the Luhansk People's Republic and the start of the War in the Donbas, Holenko initially returned to Kyiv and briefly resided there. He then ran on 26 October 2014 in the 2014 Ukrainian parliamentary elections for constituency No. 113 (Svatove) with the Opposition Bloc, but lost with 20.5% of the vote.

After the elections, in December, the Security Service of Ukraine opened criminal proceedings against Luhansk on suspicion of violating Ukraine's territorial integrity. At the time, however, nothing came of these charges. Cases against him were renewed in 2016 when he was put under suspicion in connection with the investigation of Oleksandr Yefremov. Holenko was previously considered a close associate of Yefremov. During the case, he fled to Moscow and was put on the list of persons hiding from the Prosecutor General's Office of Ukraine. In 2018, the Prosecutor's Office petitioned the Pecherskyi District Court of Kyiv for a trial in absentia of Holenko.

== Personal life ==
Holenko is married to Halyna Mykolaivna, who previously served as director of LLC "Skhidavtogaz". They have two sons: Dmytro (born 1981) and Oleksiy (born 1986). In May 2026, after attending the Lyceum of Foreign Languages in Luhansk, Oleksiy became deputy general director of the pro-Russian "State Television and Radio Company of the LPR".

According to Realnaya Gazeta, Holenko acquired Russian citizenship in his native city of Millreovo on 14 April 2017. In the filing, he stated that he has a residence in Luhansk but lives in Kotelniki near Moscow. In 2023, Holenko was banned from entering the territory of the Luhansk People's Republic and carrying out economic and financial activities in the region. It was theorised that he was most likely banned due to his business activities in the LPR, namely gas production. After this, Holenko attempted to appeal to the Prosecutor General of Russia, Igor Krasnov, in which he said he had supported pro-Russian figures and the LPR, and that he had condemned the "bloody Kyiv regime" and was wanted by the SBU.

== Awards and honours ==
Holenko has been awarded the following honours:

- Honourary Diploma of the Verkhovna Rada (awarded in 2003)
- Order of Merit, III class (awarded in 2004)
- Certificate of Honour of the Cabinet of Ministers of Ukraine (awarded in 2006)
