= Oleksiy Danilov =

Ukrainian politician (born 1962)

- Олексій Данілов
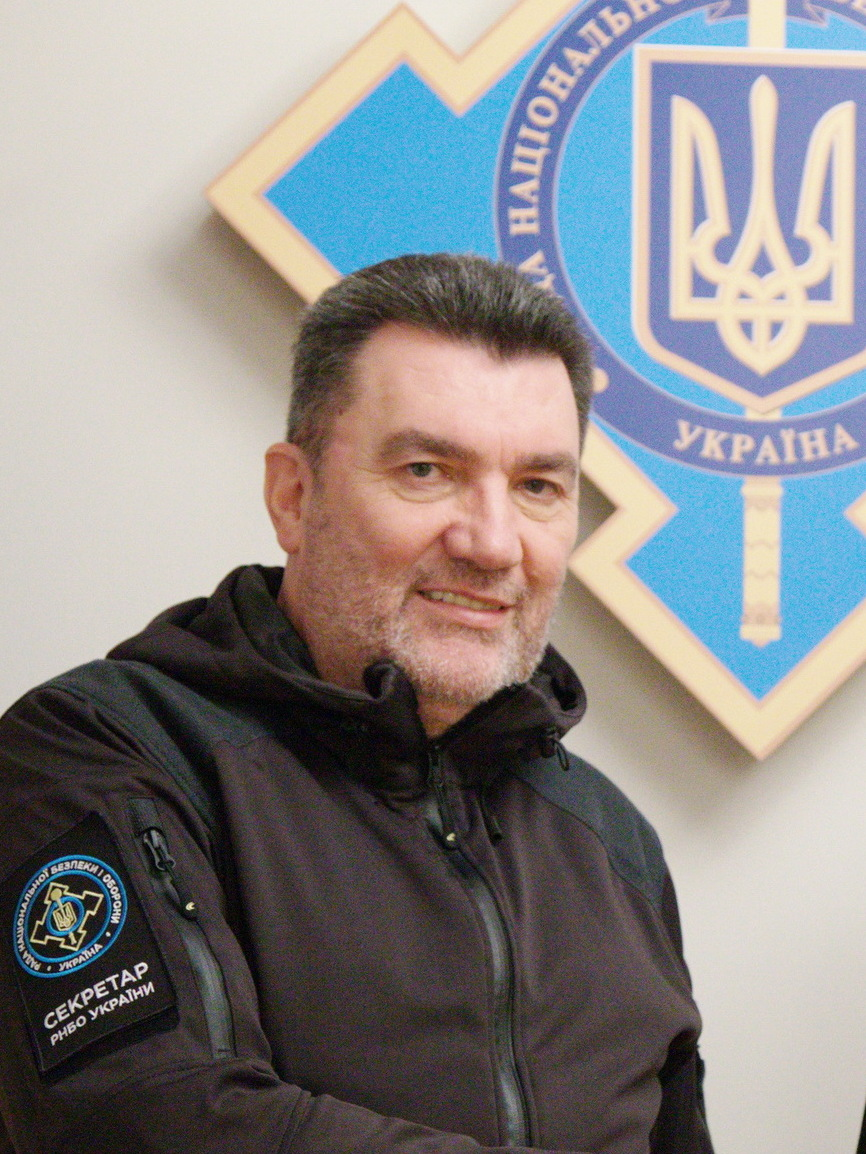
- Danilov in 2022

Secretary of the National Security and Defense Council of Ukraine
- In office 3 October 2019 – 26 March 2024
- President: Volodymyr Zelenskyy
- Preceded by: Oleksandr Danylyuk
- Succeeded by: Oleksandr Lytvynenko

Governor of Luhansk Oblast
- In office 4 February 2005 – 8 November 2005
- President: Viktor Yuschenko
- Preceded by: Oleksandr Yefremov
- Succeeded by: Hennadiy Moskal

Mayor of Luhansk
- In office July 1994 – September 1997
- Preceded by: Volodymyr Pantyukhin
- Succeeded by: Anatoliy Parapanov (acting)

Personal details
- Born: 7 September 1962 (age 64) Krasnyi Luch, Ukrainian SSR, Soviet Union (now Khrustalnyi, Ukraine)
- Party: Social Democratic Party of Ukraine (united); Party of Free Democrats
- Other political affiliations: Yulia Tymoshenko Bloc (2006–2007)
- Education: University of Luhansk; East Ukrainian Volodymyr Dahl National University; Luhansk State University of Internal Affairs
- Occupation: Veterinarian; Politician

Oleksiy Miacheslavovych Danilov (Ukrainian: Олексій Мячеславович Данілов; born 7 September 1962) is a Ukrainian politician who was the secretary of the National Security and Defense Council of Ukraine from 2019 to 2024, when he was replaced by Oleksandr Lytvynenko, the former head of the Foreign Intelligence Service.

== Early life and early career ==
Danilov graduated in 1981 from the Starobilsk State Farm Technical School with a degree in veterinary medicine. In 1981 he began working as a veterinary in a farm in Voroshilovgrad (currently Luhansk). From 1983 to 1987, he worked as a veterinarian in Voroshilovgrad's park "1 May". From 1987 to 1991 he worked as a private veterinarian. From 1991 to 1994 he was engaged in private entrepreneurship.

== Political career ==
Danilov was Mayor of Luhansk from 1994 to 1997. Aged 31 years, he was the youngest ever mayor of Luhansk.

In the 1998 Ukrainian parliamentary election Danilov unsuccessfully ran for a parliamentary seat in electoral district 103 as an independent candidate.

In 1999, Danilov graduated from the University of Luhansk as a licensed history teacher. In 2000, he received a master's degree in management from the East Ukrainian Volodymyr Dahl National University. In 2000, he also received a law degree from the Luhansk State University of Internal Affairs.

In the early 2000s, Danilov was a member of the Yabluko party (which was renamed Party of Free Democrats during his membership). In the 2002 Ukrainian parliamentary election he ran unsuccessfully for parliament on the party list.

In 2000, Danilov was an adviser to the parliamentary Committee on Industrial Policy and Entrepreneurship. From October 2001 to February 2005, he founded the Luhansk Initiative and was its chairman. At the same time, he was as deputy director of the Institute for European Integration and Development (IEID).

Danilov served as the Governor of Luhansk Oblast in 2005.

Danilov was elected to the Verkhovna Rada in 2006 for the Yulia Tymoshenko Bloc. In the 2007 Ukrainian parliamentary election Danilov ran for re-election to parliament for the Party of Free Democrats, but was again unsuccessful. After leaving parliament he returned to his previous position of deputy director of the IEID.

Danilov rose to national prominence on the strength of appearances "on Ukraine's highly-rated national prime time talk show, where he takes on the country's oligarchs, illegal privatizations, the machinations of Russia's fifth column in Ukraine, and "treasonous" votes in past parliaments."

Danilov was Deputy Secretary of the National Security and Defense Council from 23 July to 3 October 2019. Since 3 October 2019 he is the Secretary (deputy Chairman, President Volodymyr Zelenskyy is the formal chairman) of this board.

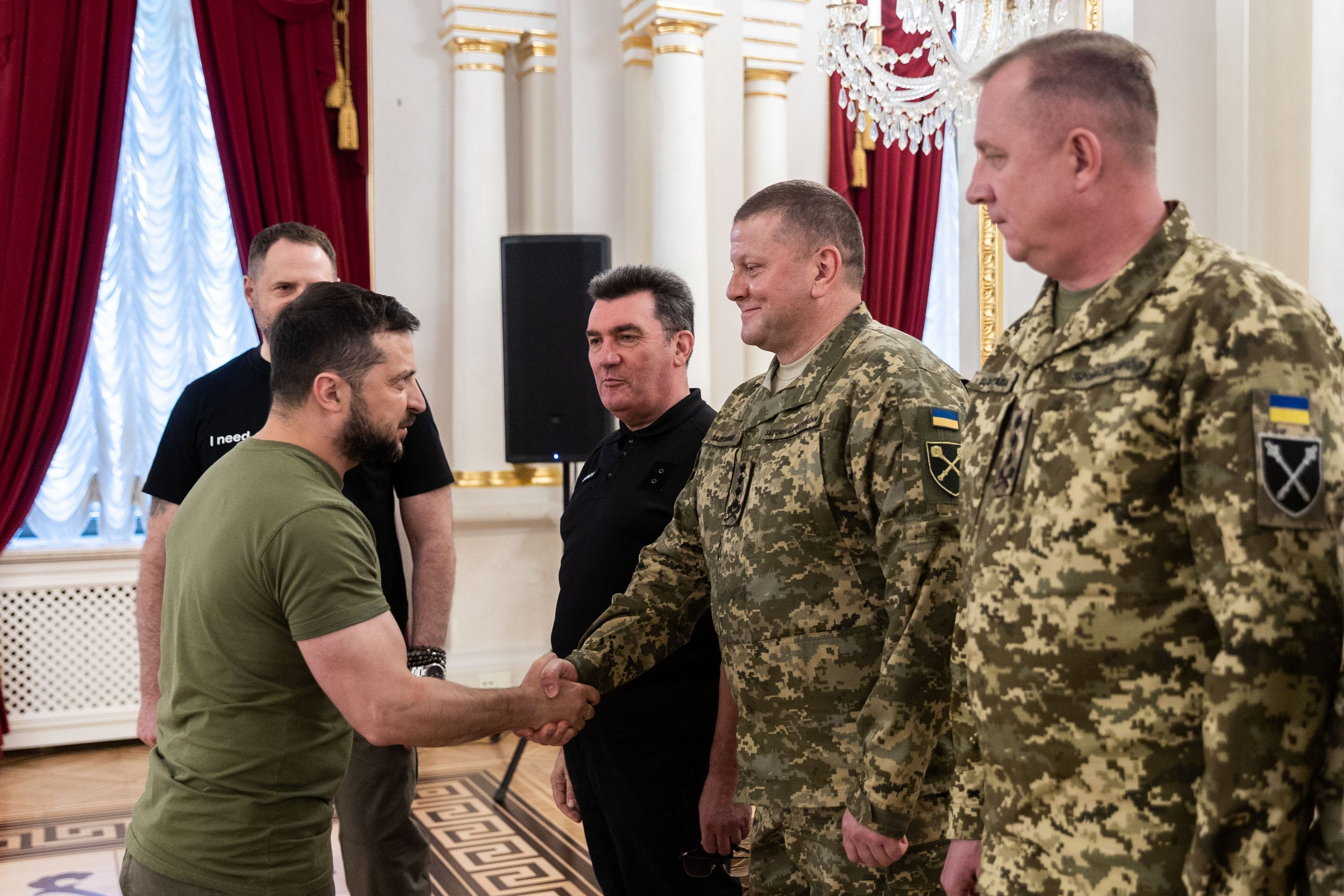
Danilov with Ukrainian President Volodymyr Zelenskyy and commander-in-chief of Ukraine’s armed forces Valerii Zaluzhnyi, 7 September 2022

On 24 January 2022, Danilov said that the movement of Russian troops near Ukraine's border was "not news" and "we don't see any grounds for statements about a full-scale offensive on our country". During the Russian invasion of Ukraine, Danilov urged men eligible for mobilisation to not "hide behind a woman's skirt".

After the 2022 Crimean Bridge explosion Danilov posted a video of the burning bridge alongside a black-and-white clip of Marilyn Monroe singing "Happy Birthday, Mr. President" – a reference to Putin turning 70 the same day.

On 6 April 2023, Danilov stated about a possible peace agreement between Russia and Ukraine, which would freeze the conflict and leave the annexed territories of Ukraine, including Crimea, in Russia's possession, that "If Ukrainian President Volodymyr Zelensky proposes peace talks between Kyiv and Moscow, he will commit political suicide."

On 15 March 2024, Danilov was interviewed by Francis Dearnley from The Daily Telegraph. In the interview he was asked multiple questions on the current situation of the war. On the topic of western aid to Ukraine, he said that Western aid needs to be on time and: "If we had a sufficient number, Avdiivka would not be an issue". He also stated that Putin is "Hitler's siamese twin" and that Putin's objective in the war is to exterminate the Ukrainian people and restore the Soviet Union. He then said in a response to a question about NATO troop deployments to Ukraine: "We don't need your soldiers, we need help with weapons. If such assistance is provided, then we are ready to put an end to the issue of Russia once and for all. To finally remove their poisonous teeth so that they will not bite anyone else in the world."

He had been appointed as the next Ukrainian ambassador to Moldova on 29 March 2024, but this did not happen, with Paun Rohovei being officially appointed by decree on 7 February 2025 instead.

== Political views ==
In October 2021, Danilov said that he believed that it would be better for Ukraine to be a presidential republic than a parliamentary-presidential one. Danilov argued that it would only be "possible to make a leap forward" with a "responsible person who understands what they are going for."

== Family ==
Danilov is married to Lyudmyla Volodymyrovna Danilova (Peregudova). The couple have four children and seven grandchildren. His granddaughter Mariya (known as Masha Danilova) is a singer.

== See also ==
- List of members of the parliament of Ukraine, 2006–07
- List of mayors of Luhansk

Political offices
Preceded by Oleksandr Danylyuk	Secretary of the National Security and Defense Council; 2019–2024	Succeeded by Oleksandr Lytvynenko
