= Manolis Pilavov =

Ukrainian-born pro-Russian politician (1964–2025)

- Манолис Пилавов
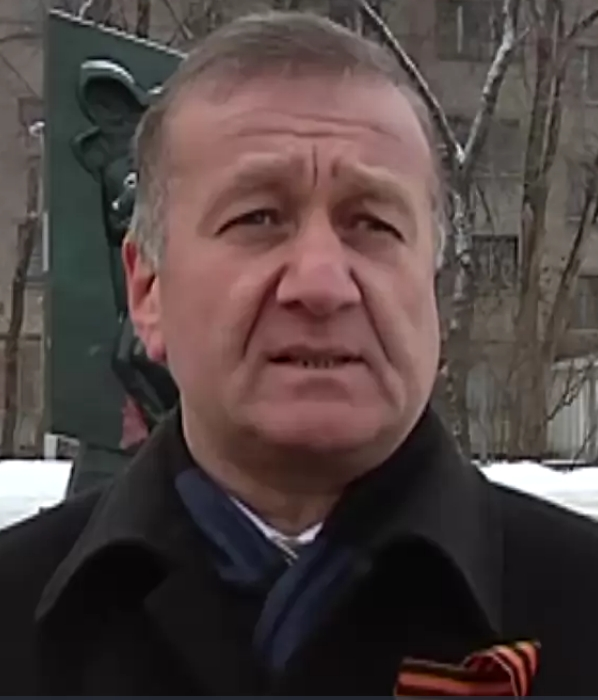
- Pilavov in 2017

Mayor of Luhansk
- In office 2 December 2014 – 8 November 2023
- LPR Head: Igor Plotnitsky; Leonid Pasechnik
- Preceded by: Serhiy Kravchenko (de jure)
- Succeeded by: Yana Pashchenko

Personal details
- Born: 24 March 1964 Alekseevka, Georgian SSR, USSR
- Died: 3 July 2025 (aged 61) Luhansk, Ukraine
- Party: United Russia
- Children: 2
- Education: Lugansk National Agrarian University; East Ukrainian Volodymyr Dahl National University

Manolis Vasilyevich Pilavov (Russian: Манолис Васильевич Пилавов; 24 March 1964 – 3 July 2025) was a politician and sports administrator who served as the de facto mayor of Luhansk under the administration of the self-proclaimed Luhansk People's Republic (LPR) from 2014 to 2023.

Pilavov also served as president of the Luhansk Oblast Football Federation and briefly held the presidency of FC Zorya Luhansk in 2009. Before entering politics and sports, he worked as a civil engineer.

He was a member of the pro-Russian Party of Regions and opposed the 2014 Revolution of Dignity. After the establishment of the LPR, he was appointed mayor by separatist authorities. The Security Service of Ukraine declared him a member of an illegal armed group and placed him on a wanted list for terrorism-related activities.

== Life and career ==
Manolis Pilavov was born in the Georgian SSR on 24 March 1964 to an ethnically mixed family with Russian, Ossetian, Greek, Georgian and Armenian roots. He moved to Luhansk at a young age.

In 1981, he graduated from the Voroshilovgrad Construction College. Afterwards, he graduated from the Luhansk Agricultural Institute with a degree in agricultural construction.

In July 1986, he became a painter of the construction department No. 4 of the Voroshilovgradpromstroy trust, and in December became a foreman of the construction department No. 2 of the Voroshilovgradpromstroy trust. In December 1989, he became the head of the production and technological machine and equipment department of the Voroshilovgradpromstroy trust. Beginning in October 1990, he served as the head of the housing maintenance association of the Lenin Raion, Luhansk and later the Zhovtnevyi Raion. In 1998, he became the first deputy head of the housing department of the Luhansk city executive committee and the first deputy chairman of the council for the activities of the executive bodies of the Kamennobrodsky district council.

In 2001, Pilavov graduated from the East Ukrainian National University with a degree in public service.

In April 2002, he became deputy mayor of Luhansk for the activities of executive bodies.

In June 2002, he became the general director of the regional communal enterprise "Luganskvoda". In February 2004, he became deputy chairman of the Kamennobrodsky district council. In April 2006, he became the first deputy of the Luhansk mayor. In 2009, he took over as president of the Luhansk Football Federation.

In 2014, amidst unrest and the following war in Donbas, he was active in maintaining Luhansk's economy, participated in the activities of the self-declared Luhansk People's Republic, and after Sergei Kravchenko was detained in August 2014, he took over the leadership of the city. On 2 December 2014, by the decree of the Head of the Luhansk People's Republic Igor Plotnitsky, he became the separatist-appointed Mayor. He was subsequently charged by the Ukrainian authorities under Article 258 of Ukraine's Criminal Code, which deals with support for armed groups.

Pilavov at the Night Wolves Donbas motor center

=== Death ===
Pilavov died on 3 July 2025 in central Luhansk as a result of an improvised explosive device (IED) detonation. The explosion occurred on Taras Shevchenko Street and was confirmed by local media aligned with the LPR. Local authorities opened a criminal investigation.
