= Oleksandr Antipov =

Ukrainian politician (born 1949)

- Олександр Антіпов

Governor of Luhansk Oblast
- In office 15 September 2006 – 18 March 2010
- Preceded by: Oleksandr Kobityev (acting)
- Succeeded by: Valeriy Holenko

Personal details
- Born: Oleksandr Nikolaevich Antipov; 10 March 1949 (age 77) Mykhailiuky (Novoaidar Raion), Ukrainian SSR, Soviet Union
- Party: Party of Regions

Oleksandr Nikolaevich Antipov (Ukrainian: Олександр Антіпов; born 10 March 1949) is a Ukrainian financial officer and politician who served as Governor of Luhansk Oblast under President Petro Poroshenko from 2006 to 2010. Before the post, he also served in various financial roles in Luhansk Oblast, most notably as Head of the State Tax Administration for the oblast.

== Early life ==
Antipov was born on 10 March 1949 in the village of Mykhailiuky, which was then part of the Ukrainian SSR in the Soviet Union. His father was named Nikolai, and his mother was named Natalie Pavlovna. After graduating from secondary school, he became an inspector for the Kamiano-Bridskyi District of Luhansk within the financial department. After a year, he then did his mandatory service with the Soviet Army. He was deployed to Afghanistan and awarded the medal "For Military Valour" for his service. After his service, he returned to the Soviet Union and returned to working within financial departments in Luhansk. He also graduated from Donetsk State University with a degree in economics during this time.

== Political career ==
In 1978, he was promoted to Head of the Financial Department of the Luhansk City Executive Committee, after having previously served in this role in the Leninsky District, which is also in Luhansk. He remained in this position until 1984, when he moved to Lviv in the west to serve in the same role. Shortly before the collapse of the Soviet Union in 1990, he returned to Luhansk from Lviv, this time to serve as Head of the State Tax Administration for the entirety of Luhansk Oblast. During his tenure in office, he also earned his Candidate of Economic Sciences from Donetsk State University in 2000. After over a decade, in 2003, he briefly left this role in Luhansk Oblast to take on the same role in Zaporizhzhia Oblast. He returned later that year, in November, to Luhansk Oblast to his same role there. In 2005, he finally left his financial roles behind, becoming an associate professor at the East Ukrainian National University in Luhansk. He did this for a year, and at the same time entered the Luhansk Oblast Council in April 2006, becoming leader of the faction of the Party of Regions and a member of the standing committee on economic development in little less than a year.

On 15 September 2006, President Viktor Yushchenko signed a decree appointing Antipov as Governor of Luhansk Oblast to replace Hennadiy Moskal permanently. He served in this role until he was dismissed on 18 March 2010. After being dismissed, he returned to his long-held post as Head of the State Tax Administration of Luhansk Oblast until 2014. Sometime later he served as a voluntary assistant to Verkhovna Rada deputy Oleh Nedava of the Petro Poroshenko Bloc.

== Personal life ==
He is married to Svitlana Volodymyrivna, who served as Head of the Department of Luhansk State Medical University and was also a Doctor of Medical Sciences. They had two children: Oleg (in 1971) and Oleksandr (in 1995). Oleg served as an inspector for a bank.

=== Anti-corruption case ===
On 24 May 2017, Antipov was detained during a large-scale anti-corruption operation by the National Police of Ukraine and the Military Prosecutor's Office of Ukraine. He was seized with around $3.8 million in cash. He was later released on bail for 15 million hryvnias by the Pecherskyi District Court of Kyiv, although prosecutors had asked for the bail to be 200 million hryvnias. Antipov at the same said he was not guilty, and that the money was not his and was instead kept by him for safekeeping. A few days later, on 2 June 2017, he was arrested again by the court with the possibility of bail for 100 million hryvnias. He had a heart attack while in jail in June 2017, according to his lawyer.

== Awards and honours ==
He has been awarded the following state awards:

- Order of the Badge of Honour
- Order of Merit, degree III
- Order of Merit, degree II (awarded September 2008)
- Honored Economist of Ukraine (awarded 1999)

Predecessor; Oleksandr Kobityev (acting)	Governor of Luhansk Oblast; 2006-2010	Successor; Valeriy Holenko
