= Anatoliy Yahoferov =

Ukrainian politician

- Анатолій Ягоферов
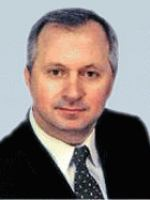

Member of the Verkhovna Rada
- In office 3 June 2008 – 12 December 2012

Mayor of Luhansk
- Acting
- In office March 1998 – May 2001
- Preceded by: Anatoliy Paravanov
- Succeeded by: Volodymyr Prystyuk (acting)

First Deputy Minister of Economy
- In office 30 October 1992 – 24 November 1992

Member of the Verkhovna Rada
- In office 15 May 1990 – 12 May 1998

Personal details
- Born: Aatoliy Mykolayovych Yahoferov; 5 October 1948 (age 78) Konotop, Sumy Oblast, Ukrainian SSR, Soviet Union
- Party: Reforms and Order Party

Anatoliy Mykolayovych Yahoferov (Ukrainian: Анатолій Миколайович Ягоферов; born 5 October 1948), is a Ukrainian politician who had last served as a member of the Verkhovna Rada from 2008 to 2012, as well from 1990 to 1998.

Yahoferov had also served as the mayor of Luhansk from 1998 to 2001.

He is a candidate of Economic Sciences since 1993, and a docent since 1997. He was a member of the Reforms and Order Party, and the head of the Luhansk regional organization.

== Biography ==
Anatoliy Yahoferov was born on 5 October 1948, in the city of Konotop, Sumy Oblast, to his father, Mykola Hryhorovych (born 1923), and his mother, Lidiya Dmytrivna (born 1925).

In 1964, he began working at the OR plant, first as a locksmith, then as a foreman, senior foreman, design engineer, site manager, deputy shop manager, head of the diesel locomotive assembly shop, director of the diesel locomotive production, deputy chief engineer of the production association "Luganskteplovoz".

From 1964 to 1966, he was an apprentice mechanic-electrical fitter of a locomotive factory.

From 1966 to 1972, he became the fitter-electrical fitter of the diesel locomotive assembly shop of the diesel locomotive factory in Luhansk.

In 1972, he graduated from the Voroshilovgrad Machine-Building Institute with a degree in mechanical engineering.

From 1972 to 1973, he served in the Soviet Army.

Between 1973 and 1987, he was a foreman, senior foreman, design engineer, department head, deputy head of the shop, head of the shop, director of locomotive production, deputy chief engineer of the "Luhanskteplovoz" VO.

In 1983, he graduated from the Moscow Institute of Management named after S. Ordzhonikidze, the faculty of organizers of industrial production and construction.

In 1987, he became the general director of the Gormashobogashchenie production association.

In 1991, he became the director of the Parkhomenko Luhansk Machine-Building Plant.

On 15 May 1990, Yahoferov was elected as a member of the Verkhovna Rada, from the Artemiv electoral district No. 50 of Luhansk Oblast. 2nd round, 53.41% of the vote, with 5 applicants. At the time of the elections: Director of Luhansk Machine-Building Plant named after Oleksandr Yakovych Parkhomenka, member of the CPSU. He was a member of the commission on planning, budget, finance and prices.

On 30 October 1992, Yahoferov became the first deputy minister of economy. He was dismissed after that on 24 November.

He was reelected on 11 May 1994 from the Artemiv electoral district No. 235 of the Luhansk Oblast, nominated by the labor collective. 2nd round — 50.11%, 12 applicants. He was a member of the "Reformy" group, and a member of the Finance and Banking Committee.

In March 1998, Yahoferov became the mayor of Luhansk.

From August 1998 to December 1999, he was an adviser to the Prime Minister of Ukraine on public grounds.

In May 2001, he was replaced by Volodymyr Prystyuk as the acting mayor.

In 2002, he became the chairman of the Board of ZAO "Luhansk Machine-Building Plant named after Parkhomenko"

In 2008, he was elected a People's Deputy of Ukraine from the Yulia Tymoshenko Bloc (the Reforms and Order party). In the list No. 175. He was sworn to office on 3 June. He was the member of the Reforms and Order party, head of the Luhansk branch of that party. At the time of the elections: a pensioner, a member of the PRP. Member of the Committee on Tax and Customs Policy (September 2008 - March 2011), member of the Committee on Finance, Banking, Tax and Customs Policy (since March 2011).

He left the Verkhovna Rada on 12 December 2012.

== Family ==
He is married to Olena Hennadiyna Yahoferova (born 1970), and has a daughter, Olha (born 1995).
