= Vladyslav Bukhariev =

Ukrainian politician and intelligence officer

- Владислав Бухарєв
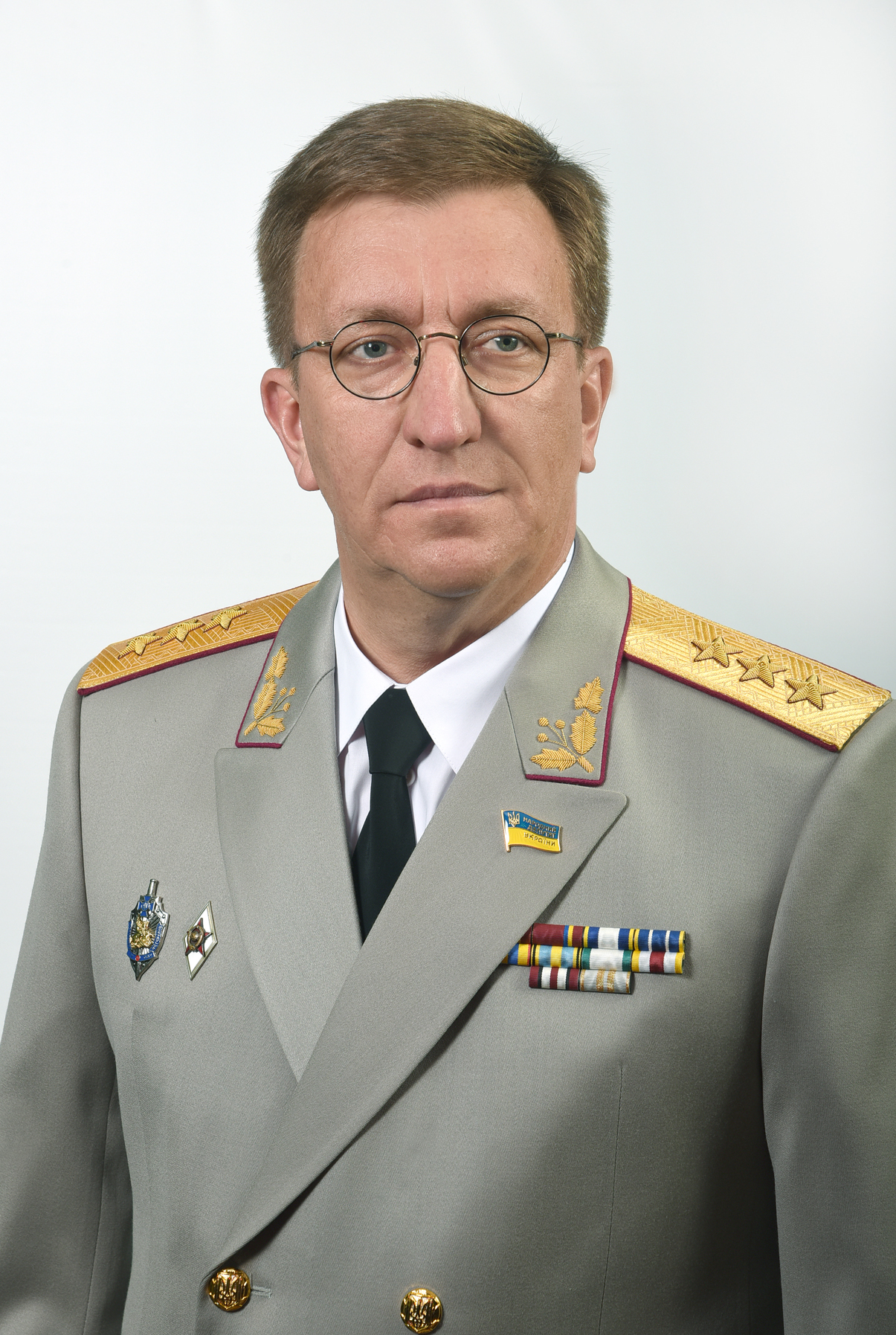
- Bukhariev in 2021

Head of the Foreign Intelligence Service of Ukraine
- In office 11 June 2019 – 11 September 2019
- President: Volodymyr Zelenskyy
- Preceded by: Yehor Bozhok
- Succeeded by: Valeriy Yevdokimov

People's Deputy of Ukraine
- In office 27 November 2014 – 29 August 2019
- Preceded by: Iryna Kupreychyk
- Succeeded by: Mykola Zadorozhnii
- Constituency: Sumy Oblast, No. 162

Personal details
- Born: 14 March 1969 (age 57) Lebedyn, Ukrainian SSR, Soviet Union
- Party: Batkivshchyna
- Education: Odesa National Academy of Telecommunications; Kyiv Higher Military Engineering School of Signal

Military service
- Allegiance: Ukraine
- Branch/service: Security Service of Ukraine
- Years of service: 1992–2007

Vladyslav Viktorovych Bukhariev (Ukrainian: Владислав Вікторович Бухарєв; born 14 March 1969) is a Ukrainian politician and intelligence officer who served as head of the Foreign Intelligence Service of Ukraine from June to September 2019. He was previously a People's Deputy of Ukraine from 2014 to 2019, representing Ukraine's 162nd electoral district as a member of Batkivshchyna.

== Biography ==
Bukhariev was born in Lebedyn, Sumy Oblast on 14 March 1969.

In 1986–1987 he started to study at the Odesa National Academy of Telecommunications and in 1987–1992 the Kyiv Higher Military Engineering School of Signal, during which he served in the Soviet Armed Forces. In 1992, he graduated from the Kyiv Higher Military Engineering School of Signal as a communications engineer.

From 1992 to 2007 Bukhariev served as a career officer in the Security Service of Ukraine (SBU) graduating the SBU Staff Training Institute (since 1995 the SBU National Academy) in 1994.

In 2007 to 2010 he served as the First Deputy Director of the State Tax Administration — Chief of Tax Militsiya. In 2010, he was honored by the Lebedyn city council receiving a title of "Honored Citizen of Lebedyn City". In 2010–2014 Bukhariev was officially retired from the Security Service of Ukraine.

Following the beginning of th Russo-Ukrainian War in 2014, Bukharivev was the First Deputy of Director of the Security Service of Ukraine and Chief of the Main Department to combat corruption and organized crime from March to July 2014. Yet later in 2014 Bukhariev was a special assignment officer at the Security Service. In November 2014 he was elected as a People's Deputy of Ukraine in the Verkhovna Rada in single constituency electoral district 162 situated in Okhtyrka. He won the district with 20.27% of the votes. Originally nonpartisan, Bukhariev later joined Batkivschyna parliamentary faction.

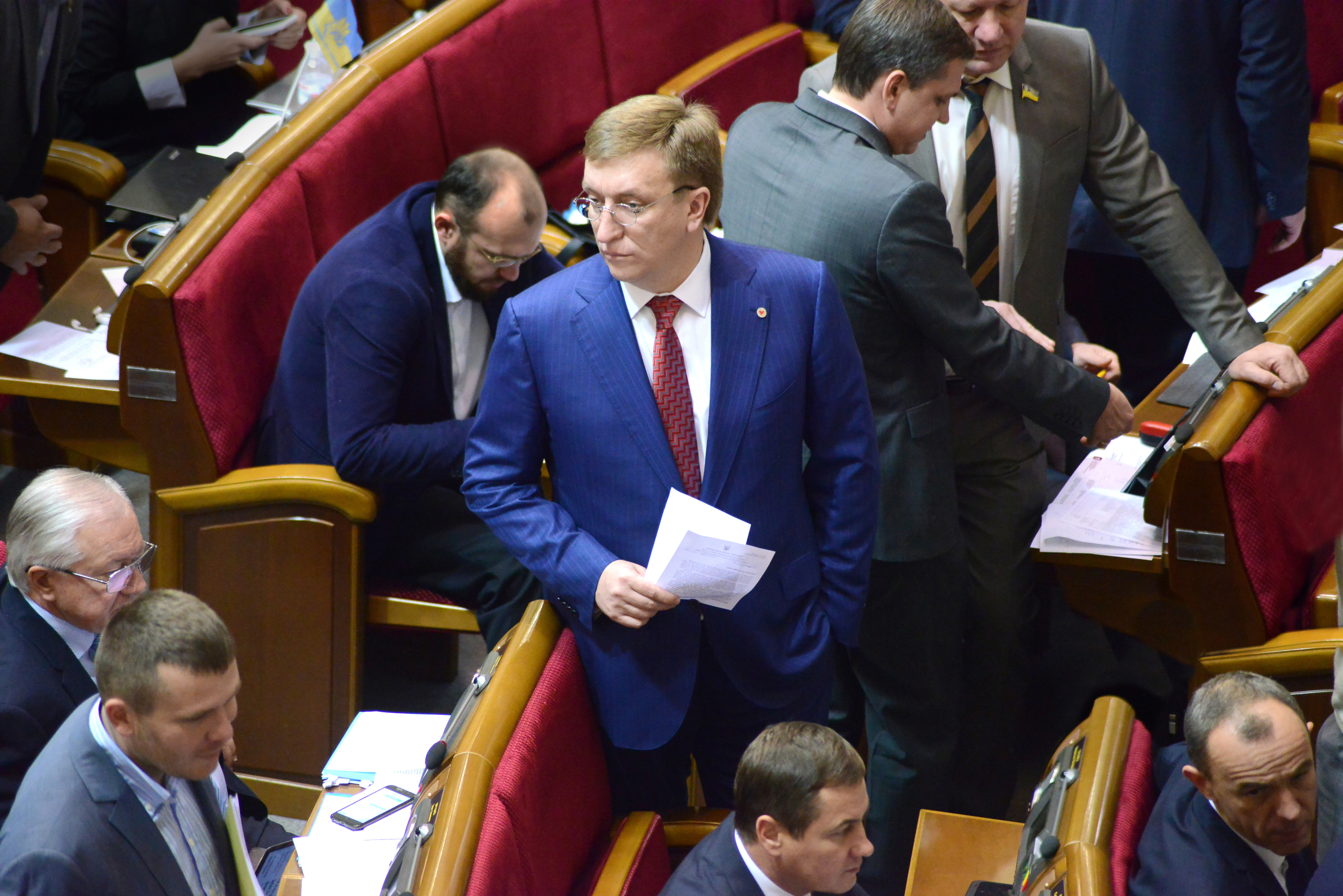
Vladyslav Bukharev in Parliament, 2016

In 2018, he attended the Sumy State University and received a qualification for law.

Bukhariev was appointed Head of the Foreign Intelligence Service of Ukraine by President Volodymyr Zelenskyy on 11 June 2019.

Bukhariev was appointed First Deputy Head of the Security Service of Ukraine on 11 September 2019. On 11 September 2020 he was dismissed from this post. He was immediately transferred to the post (he had also held in 2014) of Deputy Director of the Security Service of Ukraine, responsible for combating corruption and organized crime. Bukhariev was dismissed from this post on 8 November 2020.

On 16 April 2020 Bukhariev was appointed advisor to Minister of Internal Affairs Arsen Avakov.
