= Volodymyr Prystyuk =

- Володимир Пристюк
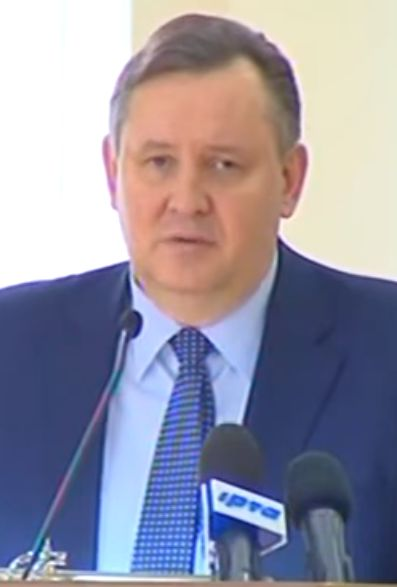
- Prystyuk in March 2014

Governor of Luhansk Oblast
- In office 10 November 2010 – 2 March 2014
- Preceded by: Valeriy Holenko
- Succeeded by: Mykhailo Bolotskykh

Mayor of Luhansk
- Acting
- In office May 2001 – March 2002
- Preceded by: Anatoliy Yahoferov
- Succeeded by: Yevhen Burlachenko

Personal details
- Born: Volodymyr Mykolayovych Prystyuk; 2 May 1960 (age 65) Antratsyt, Ukraine, Soviet Union
- Party: Party of Regions

Volodymyr Mykolayovych Prystyuk (Ukrainian: Володимир Миколайович Пристюк; born on 2 May 1960), is a Ukrainian politician who had served as the Governor of Luhansk Oblast from 2010 to 2014, as well as the acting mayor of Luhansk from 2001 to 2002.

== Biography ==
Volodymyr Prystyuk was born in Antratsyt, Luhansk Oblast.

He graduated from the Komunar Mining and Metallurgical Institute with a degree in "industrial and civil construction".

He started working as a foreman in the "Domenstroy" department of the "Komunarskstroy" trust.

From 1985 to 1987, he was the first secretary of the Kommunar Komsomol City Committee.

From 1989 to 1990, he worked as a consultant at the House of Political Education of the Voroshilovgrad Regional Committee of the Communist Party of the Ukrainian SSR, as a secretary of the Voroshilovgrad Regional Committee of the Komsomol.

From 1990 to 2001, he was the general director of Suputnyk - Luhansk LLC, Druzhba JSC.

From 2001 to 2002, Prystyuk was the secretary of the Luhansk City Council, and was the acting mayor. In 2002, he ran for the post of mayor of Luhansk, but lost to Yevhen Burlachenko.

From 2002 to 2005, he was the deputy head of the Luhansk Regional State Administration.

From 2005 to 14 April 2006, he was the President of the Association of Small and Medium Business Enterprises "Novy Chas".

From 2006 to 19 March 2010, he was deputy, then first deputy governor of Luhansk Oblast. He was elected a member of the Luhansk City Council (3rd convocation), and then as a member of the Luhansk Oblast Council (5th convocation).

Established the organization "Our Home - Lugansk" and the youth club "Sputnik".

He is a member of the Party of Regions, Candidate of Economic Sciences. Unofficially, he owns the Druzhba hotel in Luhansk.

On 10 November 2010, President Viktor Yanukovych appointed Prystyuk as the Governor of Luhansk Oblast.

On 2 March 2014, he was dismissed as governor by acting president Oleksandr Turchynov.

== Family ==
He is married and has two sons.
