= SZR (disambiguation) =

Shenzhen Media Group a Chinese company which own 12 TV channels and four radio stations.

SZR may also refer to:

- Foreign Intelligence Service of Ukraine in Ukraine
- Sheikh Zayed Road in Dubai, United Arab Emirates
- Slovenský Zväz Rádioamatérov, an amateur radio organization in Slovakia
