= Lytovchenko =

Lytovchenko or Litovchenko is a Ukrainian surname. It may refer to:

- Alexander Litovchenko (1835–1890), Ukrainian-born Russian painter
- Hennadiy Lytovchenko (born 1963), Ukrainian football coach
- Ihor Lytovchenko (born 1966), Ukrainian businessman
- Irina Litovchenko (born 1950), Soviet hurdler
- Maryna Lytovchenko (born 1991), Ukrainian para table tennis player
- Serhiy Litovchenko (footballer, born 1979), Ukrainian footballer
- Serhiy Litovchenko (footballer, born 1987), Ukrainian footballer
- Tatyana Litovchenko (born 1978), Russian swimmer
- Vyacheslav Litovchenko (born 1990), Russian ice hockey player
