= Mykola Zadorozhnii =

Ukrainian showman and politician

- Микола Задорожній
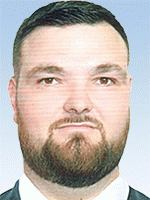
- Official portrait, 2019

People's Deputy of Ukraine
- Incumbent
- Assumed office 29 August 2019
- Preceded by: Vladyslav Bukhariev
- Constituency: Sumy Oblast, No. 162

Personal details
- Born: 5 December 1984 (age 41) Novoiulivka, Ukrainian SSR, Soviet Union (now Ukraine)
- Party: Independent
- Other political affiliations: Servant of the People
- Education: Kryvyi Rih State Pedagogical University

Mykola Mykolaiovych Zadorozhnii (Ukrainian: Микола Миколайович Задорожній; born 5 December 1984) is a Ukrainian showman and politician currently serving as a People's Deputy of Ukraine from Ukraine's 162nd electoral district since 29 August 2019. He was a member of Servant of the People (expelled due to charges in July 2024), and a former employee at Kvartal 95 Studio.

== Early life and career ==
Mykola Mykolaiovych Zadorozhnii was born on 5 December 1984 in the village of Novoiulivka, in Ukraine's southern Dnipropetrovsk Oblast. He is a graduate of the Kryvyi Rih State Pedagogical University, and worked as a teacher in physics and information. Zadorozhnii has also worked as a showman for various events, including "GB Event by Kvartal 95". He was also a member of the Brothers Gagarin comedy routine on the "Fight Club" television programme.

== Political career ==
In the 2019 Ukrainian parliamentary election, Zadorozhnii ran for the position of People's Deputy of Ukraine from Ukraine's 162nd electoral district as the candidate of Servant of the People. At the time of the election, he was an independent. He was successfully elected, winning 38.08% of the vote. His closest competitor, independent Ivan Lozovyi, got only 14.52%.

In the Verkhovna Rada (Ukrainian parliament), Zadorozhnii is a member of the Verkhovna Rada Budget Committee. According to anti-corruption non-governmental organisation Chesno, as of February 2020 Zadorozhni had proposed the most laws of any People's Deputy from Sumy Oblast.

In July 2024 Zadorozhnii was arrested on suspicion of soliciting bribes "for not interfering in the repair work of infrastructure facilities" located in Sumy Oblast. He was immediately expelled from his party. He was released on a bail of 3,028,000 hryvnia on 18 July 2024.
