= Yehor Bozhok =

Ukrainian diplomat

- Єгор Божок

Head of the Foreign Intelligence Service of Ukraine
- In office 13 September 2017 – 14 March 2019
- President: Petro Poroshenko
- Preceded by: Viktor Hvozd
- Succeeded by: Vladyslav Bukhariev

Personal details
- Born: 6 September 1980 (age 45) Kyiv, Ukrainian SSR, Soviet Union (now Ukraine)
- Education: Taras Shevchenko National University of Kyiv

Yehor Valeriiovych Bozhok (Ukrainian: Єгор Валерійович Божок; born 6 September 1980) is a Ukrainian diplomat and former chairman of the SZRU, the Foreign Intelligence Service of Ukraine. In this position he was a member of the National Security and Defense Council of Ukraine. He was acting head of the mission of Ukraine to NATO from June 2015 until his appointment as SZRU head.

He was born in Kyiv. Speaks English, French, Ukrainian and Russian.

== Biography ==
In 2000 Bozhok graduated master's degree Program in European Politics at the Free University of Brussels. In 2002 graduated from the Institute of International Relations of Taras Shevchenko National University of Kyiv.

Starting in 2002, Bozhok occupied various positions within the Ukrainian Foreign Ministry.

2002-2005 – specialist (expert), attache, 3rd Secretary of the Armed Forces Department of the Ministry of Foreign Affairs of Ukraine;

2005-2009 – 3rd, 2nd Secretary for Political Affairs of Mission of Ukraine to NATO in Brussels;

2009-2010 – 1st Secretary of the NATO Department of the Ministry of Foreign Affairs of Ukraine;

2010-2013 – Head of the Division of Justice of the European Union Department of the Ministry of Foreign Affairs of Ukraine.

From June 2015 until his Foreign Intelligence Service appointment, Bozhok was acting head of Ukraine's NATO mission.

On 13 September 2017, President Petro Poroshenko signed a decree appointing Bozhok head of the Foreign Intelligence Service of Ukraine (SZRU). On 14 March 2019 President Poroshenko dismissed Bozhok as head of the Foreign Intelligence Service. The same day he was appointed Deputy Minister of Foreign Affairs.
