= Mykola Malomuzh =

Ukrainian politician

Mykola Malomuzh Микола Маломуж
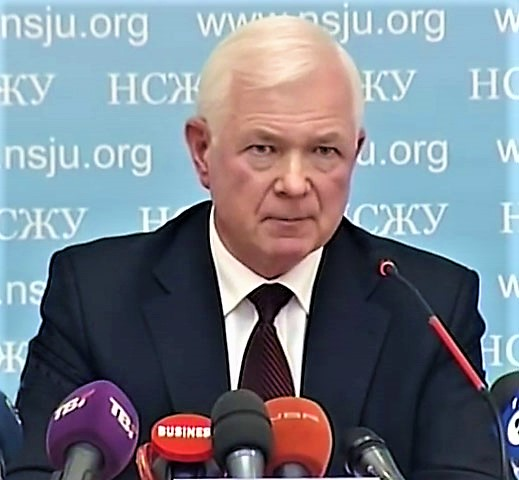
- Mykola Malomuzh in 2014

2nd Head of the Foreign Intelligence Service of Ukraine
- In office 3 April 2005 – 18 June 2010
- Preceded by: Oleh Syniansky
- Succeeded by: Hryhoriy Illyashov

Personal details
- Born: September 23, 1955 (age 71) Skalyvatka, Cherkasy Oblast, Ukrainian SSR
- Education: University of Kyiv

Mykola Hryhorovych Malomuzh (Ukrainian: Микола Григорович Маломуж) (born September 23, 1955, in Zvenyhorodka Raion, Cherkasy Oblast) is a Ukrainian politician. Malomuzh served as head of the Foreign Intelligence Service of Ukraine (2005–2010), General of the army of Ukraine (2008-2010) and was Adviser to the President of Ukraine (2010–2014).

In the 2014 Ukrainian presidential election Malomuzh received 0.13% of the vote.

== Early life ==
Malomuzh was born on 23 September 1955 in the village of Skalyvatka, which was part of the Zvenyhorodka Raion in the Ukrainian SSR of the Soviet Union. After graduating from secondary school, he joined the Soviet Army and was stationed in a uchebka (training camp) in Moscow that was specifically designed to train to protect the Supreme commander-in-chief's headquarters in the event of a nuclear war. He returned to Ukraine in 1975, going to Zvenyhorodka and then Kyiv, where in 1982 he received a degree in law with honors from the University of Kyiv.

In December 1983, he joined the KGB in a managerial position, before eventually switching to the field of countering international terrorist groups. He is most remembered in this position for allegedly keeping the file that then Head of the Ukrainian KGB, Nikolai Golushko, was going to take to Russia with a list of undercover spies from the country, although this hasn't been confirmed.

== Political career ==
After the collapse of the Soviet Union, from 1998 to March 2005 he served as Deputy Chairman of the State Committee of Ukraine for Affairs. After Viktor Yushchenko won the 2004 Ukrainian presidential election, Malomuzh started serving as a freelance adviser to him.

In April 2005, by decree of the president, he was appointed Head of the Foreign Intelligence Service of Ukraine. During his time in this position, the Verkhovna Rada established the law "On the Foreign Intelligence Service of Ukraine" that regulated the activity of foreign intelligence. Also, the incident of MV Faina happened in 2008, where Somali pirates captured the cargo ship with 21 of its crew.

Political offices
Preceded by Oleh Syniansky	Head of the Foreign Intelligence Service of Ukraine; 2005–2010	Succeeded by Hryhoriy Illyashov
