= Ihor Lytovchenko =

Ukrainian businessman (born 1966)

- Ігор Володимирович Литовченко
- Born: May 10, 1966 (age 59); Donetsk, Ukraine, USSR
- Occupation: Business owner

Ihor Volodymyrovych Lytovchenko (Ukrainian: І́гор Володи́мирович Лито́вченко; born May 10, 1966) is a founder and permanent head of the Kyivstar company since 1994. He is the chairman of the management board, and the head of business unit VimpelCom Ltd. For 15 years, Ihor Lytovchenko has been developing one of the most successful business projects in Ukraine. Under his command, Kyiv local cellular company has taken a leadership position in the national telecommunications market, providing services to 27 million subscribers around Ukraine.

== Early life and education ==
Ihor Lytovchenko was born on May 10, 1966, in Donetsk, but a few years later the family moved to Kyiv. His mother was a doctor, and he was to follow in his mother's footsteps, but in high school he changed his mind and set more ambitious goals. In 1983, Ihor Lytovchenko entered the Taras Shevchenko National University of Kyiv, Social and Political History department.

After the first course at the university, Ihor Lytovchenko joined the Soviet Army and served two years as a member of frontier troops. During the military service years the army leadership made special mention of him so that he was recommended to join the party, which was quite acceptable during the Soviet period. However, in 1985 he changed the plans and expectations of many people radically. Since the beginning of "perestroika" in the Soviet Union new opportunities appeared. Seeing them in proper perspective quite opportunely, Ihor Lytovchenko and his friends started a small trade business specialized in office equipment.

After graduating from the university in 1990, and until 1994, Ihor Lytovchenko was an assistant director of the production association "Vita", and then was the head of the "Lotos" Company.

Ihor Lytovchenko graduated from Taras Shevchenko National University of Kyiv, history department (1990) and Odesa National Academy of Telecommunications, and acquired a profession of the economist (2002).

He is a Candidate of economic science and defended a thesis “Justification of the risks and threat assessment level at the activities of enterprises” (2004). Since 2001 he has been a member of the International Telecommunication Academy and corresponding member of the International Informatization Academy. He is a member of Council of Entrepreneurs under the Cabinet of Ministers of Ukraine.

== Career ==
In 1994 he founded Kyivstar. The construction of the network was started, and the organizational structure and philosophy of the future company were laid. The first call on the Kyivstar network occurred on December 9, 1997.

Since 1994 he has been Kyivstar President. In 2010 Ihor Lytovchenko filled a position of the Head of Ukraine business unit of VimpelCom Ltd.

By the 15th anniversary of Kyivstar, Ihor Lytovchenko wrote Ukraine's first business novel "Lighting the Star. The First-person History of "Kyivstar"". The book tells the story of creating and establishing the largest telecommunications operator in the context of business and the country's development. In June 2014, it was reported that Ihor Lytovchenko was leaving the company.

For many years Ihor Lytovchenko has been recognized as the best top manager in the sphere of telecommunications according to the main Ukrainian business media's ratings (Companion, TOP-100, GVardiya), while Kyivstar heads the list of the best and the most effective companies of Ukraine. It is under the command of Ihor Lytovchenko that the company has taken the leading positions as the top cellular operator and internet provider in the national telecommunications market.

In 2010 Ihor Lytovchenko headed the business unit "Ukraine" company VimpelCom Ltd., which united Ukrainian telecom operators - Kyivstar and Beeline - Ukraine (close corporation Ukrainian Radio Systems and limited company Golden Telecom). Integration of the Kyivstar company, a mobile communications operator, and the Beeline-Ukraine, a fixed telecom business and broadband access based on FTTB, made it possible to create a multi-service operator with unique capacities and experience.

== Awards ==
- Order "For merits» III degree (2000), II degree (2004), I degree (2006).
- Award of the European Centre for Market Research (EMRC) (2003) for outstanding achievements and innovative market-based policy "Kyivstar".
- The Association of Industrial Promotion Gold Medal (France) (2003).
- Diploma of the Cabinet of Ministers for a significant personal contribution to the reform of the national economy, development of entrepreneurship and market infrastructure in Ukraine, as well as for excellence in professional activities (2003).
- Badge "Honorary telecommunications worker of Ukraine" (2005).
- The title of the best top manager of Ukraine (2009).
- According to the publishing company «Комп&ньйон» Ihor Lytovchenko was declared to be the most influential top manager of Ukraine (2010).
- Won the "Best manager - team leader" and "Best Manager - HR management", and also entered the top five executives in common "TOP-100. Best Top-Managers of Ukraine publishing company "Экономика"(2011).
