= Viktor Hvozd =

Ukrainian soldier and diplomat (1959–2021)

- Віктор Гвоздь

Chief of the Main Directorate of Intelligence of Ukraine
- In office 17 January 2008 – 17 August 2010
- Preceded by: Oleksandr Halaka
- Succeeded by: Serhiy Hmyza

Head of the Foreign Intelligence Service of Ukraine
- In office 27 February 2014 – 29 April 2016
- Preceded by: Hryhoriy Illyashov
- Succeeded by: Yehor Bozhok

Personal details
- Born: 24 May 1959 Skala-Podilska, Borshchiv Raion, Ternopil Oblast, Ukrainian SSR, Soviet Union
- Died: 28 May 2021 (aged 62) Dahab, South Sinai Governorate, Egypt

Military service
- Allegiance: Ukraine
- Branch/service: Armed Forces of Ukraine
- Rank: Lieutenant general
- Commands: Main Directorate of Intelligence

Viktor Ivanovych Hvozd (Ukrainian: Віктор Іванович Гвоздь; 24 May 1959 – 28 May 2021) was a Ukrainian military officer who was the Chief of the Main Intelligence Directorate of the Ministry of Defense of Ukraine and a former Head of the Foreign Intelligence Service of Ukraine.

== Early career ==
Hvozd was born on 24 May 1959 in Skala-Podilska, Borshchiv Raion, Ternopil Oblast. In 1981 graduated from the Kiev Higher Combined Arms Command School. From then, served in the Military Intelligence in the Trans-Baikal and Carpathian Military Districts as a translator of a separate reconnaissance battalion, commander of a reconnaissance company of a motorized rifle regiment, commander of a reconnaissance-airborne company of a separate reconnaissance battalion, officer of the intelligence center of the intelligence directorate of the military district.

== Service in Ukrainian military ==
In 1992, he became an officer of the Intelligence Center of the Intelligence Directorate at the HQ of the Carpathian Military District. In 1993–1995 participated in peacekeeping operations as part of the United Nations Protection Force.

In 1995, he began service at the Main Directorate of Intelligence of the Ministry of Defense of Ukraine. The following year, he became the Defense Attaché at the Embassy of Ukraine in Croatia and in Bosnia and Herzegovina (concurrently), since 1999 — in senior positions, such as Representative of the Ministry of Defense at the Permanent Mission of Ukraine to the UN.

in 1997 — from the Faculty of Law of the Ivan Franko National University of Lviv; in 2005 — Master's program at Kyiv University of Economics and Law; in 2009 — Military Diplomatic Academy, Master of Military Administration. In 1999, completed a course on the Armed Forces' participation in peacekeeping operations at the Academy of the General Staff of the Armed Forces of Turkey (Istanbul)

From 2003 — Deputy Head of the Main Directorate for Law Enforcement Agencies, Military Formations of the Presidential Administration of Ukraine, since 2006 — Head of the Department of Military-Technical Cooperation of the Secretariat of the President of Ukraine.

From January 2008 to August 2010, he served as the Chief of the Main Intelligence Directorate of the Ministry of Defense of Ukraine. In 2009, he completed security course at the Harvard Kennedy School. Hvozd took part in the November 2013 to February 2014 Euromaidan protests.

== In government ==
In February 2014, he became the Commissioner of the Verkhovna Rada of Ukraine for the activities of intelligence agencies of Ukraine. From February 2014 to April 2016, he was the Head of the Foreign Intelligence Service of Ukraine. Since May 2016 until his death, he was the President of the Independent Analytical Center for Geopolitical Studies "Borysfen Intel", created on his initiative in 2012.

== Personal life and death ==
Hvozd was survived by his wife and two children. On 28 May 2021, Hvozd died after drowning during a scuba diving at a depth of several tens of meters at a resort in Dahab, Egypt, at the age of 62.

Lieutenant General of the Reserve, Doctor of Military Sciences (specialty "Military Security of the State"), Honored Lawyer of Ukraine. The author of the book "Military Intelligence of Ukraine at the Turn of the Third Millennium" (2017), and of the monograph "Historical, Legal and Political Aspects of the State's Intelligence Activity" (2018).

Fluent in English, Croatian, Serbian, Chinese. Hvozd was a recipient of the Order of Merit, III degree.

Government offices
Preceded by Oleksandr Halaka	Head of the Chief Directorate of Intelligence of the MDU; 2008–2010	Succeeded by Serhiy Hmyza
Preceded by Hryhoriy Illyashov	Head of the Foreign Intelligence Service of Ukraine; 2014–2017	Succeeded by Yehor Bozhok
