= Yevhen Burlachenko =

Ukrainian politician

- Євген Бурлаченко

4th Mayor of Luhansk
- In office March 2002 – April 2006
- Preceded by: Volodymyr Prystyuk (acting)
- Succeeded by: Serhiy Kravchenko

Personal details
- Born: Yevhen Dmytrovych Burlachenko; 7 February 1952 (age 74) Sharya, Russia, Soviet Union
- Party: Forward! Ukraine
- Spouse: Nataliya Pavlivna Burlachenko
- Children: Yarloslav Yevhenovich Burlachenko

Yevhen Dmytrovych Burlachenko (Ukrainian: Євген Дмитрович Бурлаченко; born on 7 February 1952), is a Russian-born Ukrainian politician who had served as the 4th mayor of Luhansk from 2002 to 2006.

== Biography ==
Yevhen Burlachenko was born on 7 February 1952 in the city of Sharya, Kostroma Oblast, to an ethnically Ukrainian family of employees.

He studied at school number 17 in Luhansk.

In 1974, he graduated from the Voroshilovgrad Machine-Building Institute, Faculty of Transportation, with a degree in industrial transport engineering.

Then he worked as a designer at the UkrNIIgiprougol Institute. He aisles served in the Soviet Army. After the service in the army, he continued to work at the institute, where he worked until February 1978.

From 1978 to 1992 he worked in the KGB of the USSR, and from 1992 to 2002 he worked in the Security Service of Ukraine, rose to the rank of colonel of the SBU.

In 2002, Burlachenko was elected mayor of Luhansk.

In April 2006, he ran for reelection as mayor, but lost the election to Serhiy Kravchenko.

In the first half of March 2006, outgoing Mayor Burlachenko resigned from the SBU.

== Family ==
He is married to Nataliya Pavlivna Burlachenko, and has a son, Yaroslav (born in 1976).
