= Oleksandr Lytvynenko (politician) =

Ukrainian civil servant, head of the foreign intelligence

- Олександр Литвиненко
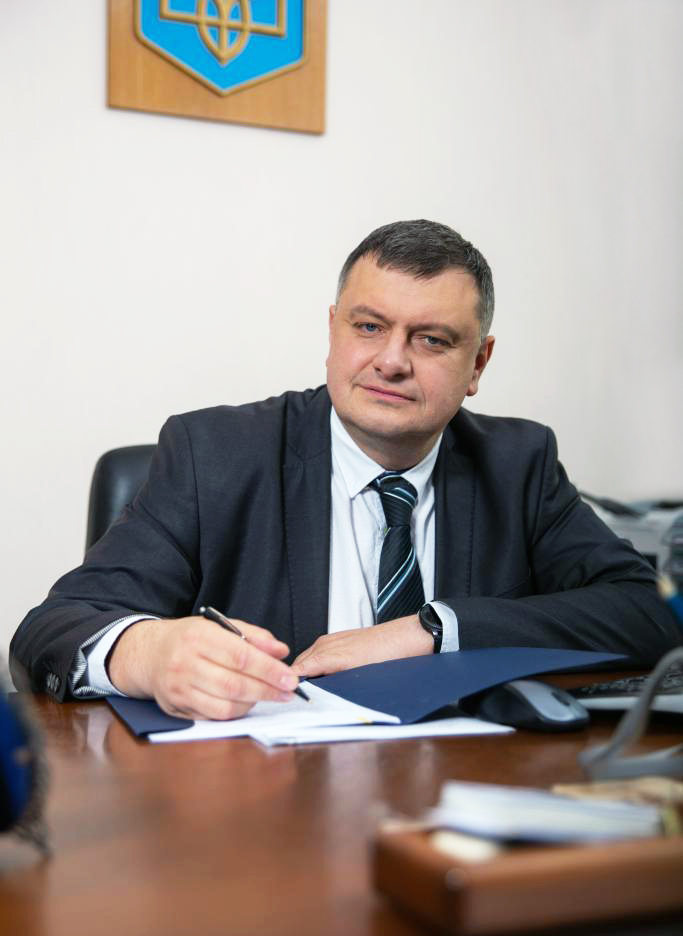
- Lytvynenko in 2021

Secretary of the National Security and Defense Council
- In office 26 March 2024 – 17 July 2025
- President: Volodymyr Zelenskyy
- Preceded by: Oleksiy Danilov
- Succeeded by: Rustem Umerov

Head of the Foreign Intelligence Service
- In office 23 July 2021 – 26 March 2024
- President: Volodymyr Zelenskyy
- Preceded by: Valery Kondratyuk
- Succeeded by: Oleh Ivashchenko

Director of the National Institute for Strategic Studies
- In office 13 August 2019 – 23 July 2021
- President: Volodymyr Zelenskyy
- Preceded by: Rostyslav Pavlenko; Vasyl Yablonskyi (acting)
- Succeeded by: Oleksandr Bohomolov

Personal details
- Born: 27 April 1972 (age 54) Kyiv, Ukrainian SSR, Soviet Union
- Education: Taras Shevchenko National University of Kyiv

Oleksandr Valeriiovych Lytvynenko (Ukrainian: Олександр Валерійович Литвиненко; born 27 April 1972) is a Ukrainian politician, who has served as the Secretary of the National Security and Defense Council of Ukraine from 2024 to 2025. Headquarters Coordinator of the Headquarters of the Supreme Commander-in-Chief.

== Career ==
From 4 April 2014 to 13 August 2019, he served as the Deputy Secretary of the National Security and Defense Council of Ukraine.

From 13 August 2019 to 23 July 2021, he was the director of the National Institute for Strategic Studies.

On 23 July 2021, he was appointed as the head of the Foreign Intelligence Service. Since 27 July 2021, he was a member of the National Security and Defense Council of Ukraine.

On 26 March 2024, president Volodymyr Zelenskyy appointed Lytvynenko as the Secretary of the National Security and Defense Council. He was replaced by Rustem Umerov on 18 July 2025.

== Awards ==
- Jubilee medal «25 Years of Independence of Ukraine» (2016)
- Honored Worker of Science and Technology of Ukraine(2011)
- Fifth Class order of Prince Yaroslav the Wise(August 21, 2020)
