= Hryhoriy Illyashov =

Ukrainian politician and spy (born 1965)

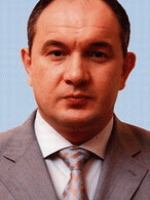
Image of Hryhoriy Oleksiyovych Illyashov

Hryhoriy Oleksiyovych Illyashov (Ukrainian: Григорій Олексійович Ілляшов; born April 13, 1965) is a former KGB operative, Ukrainian spy, and politician. He made a career in the Security Service of Ukraine. Illyashov is a husband of former Minister of Justice of Ukraine Olena Lukash.

In 2010 he was appointed the head of the Foreign Intelligence Service of Ukraine.

Government offices
Preceded by Mykola Malomuzh	Head of the Foreign Intelligence Service of Ukraine; 2010–2014	Succeeded by Viktor Hvozd
