= Valeriy Yevdokimov =

Ukrainian major general

- Валерій Євдокимов

Ambassador to Tajikistan
- Incumbent
- Assumed office 24 June 2022
- President: Volodymyr Zelenskyy
- Preceded by: Vasyl Severatyuk

Head of the Foreign Intelligence Service of Ukraine
- In office 20 September 2019 – 4 June 2020
- President: Volodymyr Zelenskyy
- Preceded by: Vladyslav Bukhariev
- Succeeded by: Valeriy Kondratyuk

Personal details
- Born: 17 November 1969 (age 56) Rivne, Ukrainian SSR, Soviet Union (now Ukraine)
- Education: Institute of Border Troops; National Academy of the Security Service; Kyiv-Mohyla Business School

Military service
- Allegiance: Ukraine
- Branch/service: Soviet Border Troops; State Security Administration; State Border Guard Service of Ukraine
- Rank: Major general

Major General Valeriy Volodymyrovych Yevdokimov (Ukrainian: Валерій Володимирович Євдокимов; born 17 November 1969) is a Ukrainian politician and former army officer who is currently the ambassador to Tajikistan since 24 June 2022. He had served as the Head of the Foreign Intelligence Service of Ukraine from 2019 to 2020.

== Biography ==
Yevdokimov was born on 17 November 1969 in the city of Rivne, in western Ukraine. He graduated from the Institute of Border Troops, the National Academy of the Security Service and the Kyiv-Mohyla Business School.

Yevdokimov served in the Soviet Border Troops, the State Security Administration and the State Border Guard Service.

From 9 July to 20 September 2019 Yevdokimov was Deputy Head of the Foreign Intelligence Service of Ukraine, succeeding Vladyslav Bukhariev.

On 20 September 2019 President Volodymyr Zelenskyy appointed Yevdokimov Head of the Foreign Intelligence Service. He was appointed a member of the NSDC on 15 October 2019.

President Zelenskyy replaced Yevdokimov as Head of the Foreign Intelligence Service with Valeriy Kondratyuk on 5 June 2020.

== Awards ==
- Order of Danylo Halytsky (2017).
- Decoration of the President of Ukraine “For Participation in the Anti-Terrorist Operation”.

Political offices
Preceded by Vladyslav Bukhariev	Head of the Foreign Intelligence Service of Ukraine; 2019–2020	Succeeded by Valeriy Kondratyuk
