= Oleksandr Kobityev =

Ukrainian politician

- Олександр Кобітєв

Governor of Luhansk Oblast (acting)
- In office 26 April 2006 – 15 September 2006
- Preceded by: Hennadiy Moskal
- Succeeded by: Oleksandr Antipov

Personal details
- Born: Oleksandr Yevhenovych Kubityev; 18 February 1962 (age 64) Luhansk, Soviet Union
- Party: Strong Ukraine

Oleksandr Yevhenovych Kubityev (Ukrainian: Олександр Євгенович Кобітєв; born on 18 February 1962), is a Ukrainian politician who served as the acting governor of Luhansk Oblast in 2006. He had been the 1st deputy head of the Luhansk Oblast State Administration.

== Biography ==
Oleksandr Kubityev was born in Luhansk on 18 February 1962.

From September 1979 to July 1983 he attended the Voroshilovgrad Mechanical Engineering Institute. A year after graduation, he was the deputy secretary of the Komsomol Committee of the Voroshilovgrad Mechanical Engineering Institute. He was a member of the Communist Party of the Soviet Union.

From November 1985 to September 1986, he was the 1st secretary of the October District Committee of the LKSU of Voroshilovgrad.

From September 1986 to November 1989, he was the 2nd secretary of the Voroshilovgrad Regional Committee of the Communist Party of Ukraine.

In November 1989 to May 1996, he was the deputy chief engineer, assistant director for foreign economic relations of the Luhansk Automobile Assembly Plant.

From May 1996 to October 2000, he was the general director of the joint Ukrainian-Polish enterprise "Rafako-Ukraine".

From October 2000 to May 2002, he was the deputy head of the Luhansk Oblast State Administration.

In January 2002, he ran as a candidate for Verkhovna Rada.

From May 2002 to July 2004, he was the 1st Deputy Chairman of the Luhansk Oblast State Administration.

Since January 2005, he had been the chairman of the board of the Luhansk regional organization of the All-Ukrainian Golf Federation.

In the same year, he was the 1st Deputy Head of the Luhansk Oblast State Administration.

On 26 April 2006, Kobtiyev became the acting governor of Luhansk Oblast. On 15 September, he left office.

From July to October 2010, he was the head of the Luhansk regional organization of the Strong Ukraine party.
