= Spiridon Kilinkarov =

Ukrainian politician

- Спірідон Кілінкаров
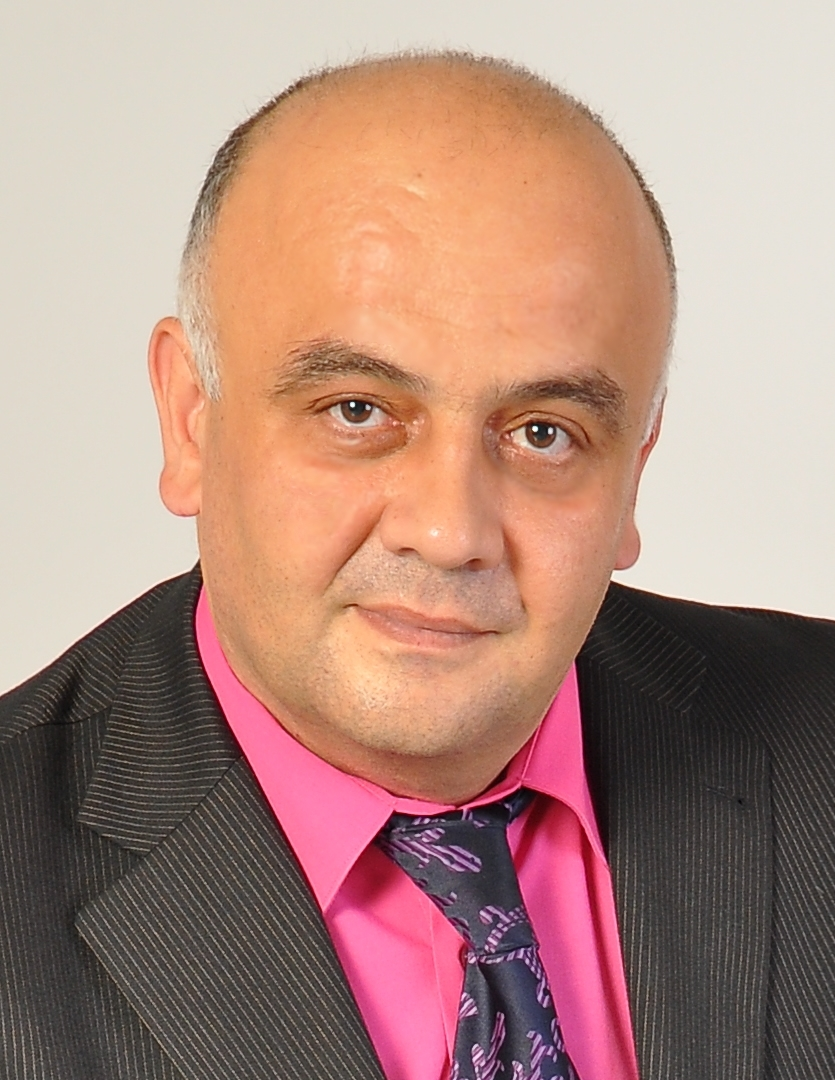
- Kilinkarov in July 2012

People's Deputy of Ukraine
- In office 25 May 2006 – 27 November 2014
- Constituency: KPU, No. 4 (2012–2014)

Personal details
- Born: 14 September 1968 (age 57) Luhansk, Ukrainian SSR, Soviet Union (now Ukraine)
- Political party: Communist Party of Ukraine (since 2001)

Spiridon Pavlovych Kilinkarov (Ukrainian: Спірідон Павлович Кілінкаров; Russian: Спиридон Павлович Килинкаров, romanized: Spiridon Pavlovich Kilinkarov; born 14 September 1968) is a Ukrainian pro-Russian politician who served as a People's Deputy of Ukraine from the Communist Party of Ukraine from 2006 to 2014. Since the 2014 Revolution of Dignity, he has lived in Russia and worked as an analyst for Russian state media.

== Biography ==
Spiridon Kilinkarov was born in Luhansk on 14 September 1968 to a family of Greek origin, with his father, Pavel Levanovich, who worked as a mechanic, then as head of the supply department at a car assembly plant, and to his mother Zinaida Spiridonovna.

From 1975 to 1985, he studied at Luhansk Secondary School No. 25, from his class teacher O. N. Pangernikova. He also worked as a loader at a car assembly plant, at the Luhansk Auto Assembly Plant, at the Department of Foreign Cooperation.

In 1992, he graduated from the mechanical faculty of the Luhansk Machine-Building Institute with a degree in process engineering and began to engage in a business related to automotive repair.

Between 1992 and 1995, Kilinkarov was the head of the supply and sales department of the Soyuzavto company, co-founder of the company Full Partnership. In one pre-election interviews, Kilinkarov said that he started doing business back in 1993, in particular, it was about an enterprise engaged in repairing cars and buses.

Between 1995 and 1997, he began working in the Zhovtnevsky District executive committee of Luhansk as the head of the department for family and youth affairs.

In 1996, he worked as an assistant to the First Secretary of the Luhansk Regional Committee of the Communist Party of Ukraine Volodymyr Zemlyakov.

From 1997 to 1998, he was a master's student in public administration at the Eastern Ukrainian National University named after Volodymyr Dahl. He received a master's degree in public administration in 1998.

Between 1998 and 2006, he was an assistant-consultant to the People's Deputy of Ukraine Dorohuntsov, as part of the executive committee of Zhovtnev district council in Luhansk.

In January 2001, he joined the Communist Party of Ukraine, and was elected head of the general department of the regional committee. In 2002, he was elected secretary of the regional committee of the Communist Party of Ukraine. He was a member of the Central Committee of the Communist Party of Ukraine since 2003.

In May 2005, he was elected first secretary of the Luhansk regional party committee.

In 2006, Kilinkarov was elected a member of the Verkhovna Rada of Ukraine of the V convocation (No. 3 on the electoral list).

From 2007 to 2012, he was the Secretary of the European Integration Committee.

In 2010, Kilinkarov ran for mayor of Luhansk, lagging behind, according to official figures, the favorite of the elections of the local candidate, Serhiy Kravchenko by only 21 votes. He did not recognize the results of the elections, accusing the Party of Regions of falsification.

In December 2012, he became the Head of the Verkhovna Rada Committee on Construction, Urban Planning, Housing and Communal Services and Regional Policy.

In the summer of 2014, a story appeared on Ukrainian TV, according to which, in the village of Stukalova Balka near Luhansk, at Kilinkarov's dacha, soldiers of the Aidar Battalion discovered two grenade launchers of the latest modification of Russian production and a box of grenades. Kilinkarov himself accused the participants in the assault on his summer cottage in looting the house.

According to Myrotvorets, he actively contributed to the creation of the Luhansk People's Republic.

By April 2015, Kilinkarov was one of four former people's deputies of the 7th convocation who refused to leave the office after the termination of their powers.

In the summer of 2015, Kilinkarov, as head of the Luhansk Regional Committee of the Communist Party of Ukraine, expressed his distrust of Petro Symonenko and refused to participate in his Left Opposition group. On 2 December 2, by the decision of the Presidium of the Central Committee of the Communist Party of Ukraine "for a splitting position, defiant failure to comply with and ignoring the decisions of the Central Committee and its Presidium," the head of the Luhansk regional committee, Kilinkarov, was removed from his post, and the party organization itself was disbanded.

Since the Revolution of Dignity in 2014, Kilinkarov lives in Moscow. Since 2014, he has been commenting on events taking place in Ukraine. He is a permanent expert and participant in the socio-political talk shows "Time Will Show", "Evening with Vladimir Solovyov" (the presenter considers him his friend), "60 Minutes", "Own Truth" on state Russian TV channels. At the same time, he mainly takes a pro-Russian position. Following the 2020 Belarusian presidential election he has also spoken on topics of Russian-Belarusian relations and the internal political situation in Belarus, as well as the poisoning of Alexei Navalny.

On 15 January 2023, Kilinkarov has been under sanctions of the National Security Council for anti-Ukrainian activities.

On 17 March, Kilinkarov was included in the Latvian sanctions list for “supporting atrocities committed by the Kremlin regime,” with a ban on entry into the country.

== Family ==
He and his wife, Iryna Serhiyivna (born in 1967), have three children: Dmytro (born in 1996), Sofiya, and Darya (born 2008).
