= Serhiy Kravchenko (politician) =

Ukrainian politician

- Сергій Кравченко

5th Mayor of Luhansk
- In office April 2006 – 2 December 2014
- Preceded by: Yevhen Burlachenko
- Succeeded by: Manolis Pilavov (de facto)

Personal details
- Born: Serhiy Ivaonovych Kravchenko; 11 April 1960 (age 65); Khotyn, Ukraine, Soviet Union
- Political party: Party of Regions
- Spouse: Svitlana Yevhenivna Kravchenko
- Children: 1

Serhiy Ivanovych Kravchenko (Ukrainian: Сергій Іванович Кравченко; born on 11 April 1960), is a Ukrainian politician who last served as the 5th mayor of Luhansk from 2006 to 2014, as a member of the Party of Regions.

== Biography ==
=== Early life ===
Serhiy Kravchenko was born on 11 April 1960 in Khotyn, Chernivtsi Oblast.

From 1977 to 1982, he studied and graduated with honors from the Omsk Armoured Engineering Institute, and was awarded the qualification of an officer with a higher military special education as a mechanical engineer, specializing in tracked and wheeled vehicles.

He completed military service in the Soviet Armed Forces as an officer from 1982 to 1987 in the Central Group of Forces, in Czechoslovakia. From 1987 to 1993, he was in the Artemivsky District Military Commissariat of Luhansk. From 1993 to 1998, he was part of the Kamianobridsky District Military Commissar of Luhansk.

He was last ranked as a lieutenant colonel.

=== Entry into politics ===
From 1994 to 1998, he was the Deputy of the Kamenobrodsky district council in Luhansk of the 22nd convocation. In 1998, he has been elected head of the Kamenobrodsky district council in the city of Luhansk on the 23rd and 24th convocations. He has been a military serviceman who was seconded to work in local self-government bodies in connection with his election as the head of the Kamianobrid District Council in Luhansk.

Since May 1998, he has been working as the chairman of the Kamianobrid District Council in Luhansk.

Kravchenko ran for people's deputies in the 105th constituency in the 2002 parliamentary elections.

He joined the Party of Regions.

In 2003, he was elected first deputy head of the Luhansk regional branch of the Party of Regions. In January 2005, he was elected the head of the party's city organization in Luhansk.

=== Mayor of Luhansk ===
In April 2006, Kravchenko was elected 5th Mayor of Luhansk.

In 2010, he won reelection as mayor, gaining 48,138 votes and 21 votes ahead of his closest competitor Spiridon Kilinkarov, who was a Verkhovna Rada deputy from the Communist Party of Ukraine.

Under Kravchenko's leadership as mayor, the overpass was overhauled, the Luhansk Philharmonic was overhauled, the park near the Rossiya shopping center and the square near the memorial to the Fighters of the Revolution were repaired, and British Mark V tanks were restored.

=== Euromaidan ===
Kravchenko was one of the organizers of "Anti-Maidans" actions in support of the government of Viktor Yanukovych, which were held in various cities of Ukraine as a response to the Euromaidan. When militants seized the entrance to the Luhansk City Council building in April 2014, Kravchenko said that this did not prevent the employees of the executive committee from performing their duties. On 11 May, Luhansk held an unrecognized referendum for the independence of Luhansk Oblast from Ukraine.

From the beginning of hostilities in 2014, he was in Luhansk on the territory of the Lugansk region, then he left for another part of Ukraine. On 7 August 2014, fighters of the Aidar Battalion at one of the checkpoints in the city of Shchastia detained mayor Kravchenko, who supported pro-Russian actions. On 2 December, he was replaced by the de facto mayor, Manolis Pilavov from the Luhansk People's Republic.

== Family ==
He is married to his wife, Svitlana Yevhenivna Kravchenko (born 6 July 1961 in Luhansk). They have a daughter, Kateryna (born 14 February 1988).
