= Luhansk City Council =

Local government of Luhansk, Ukraine

Luhansk City Council Луганська міська рада

Type
- Type: Unicameral

History
- Founded: 1991
- Disbanded: 2014 (temporarily suspended)

Leadership
- Chairman (Mayor): Serhiy Kravchenko, Party of Regions until August 7, 2014

Structure
- Seats: 76
- Political groups: Following the 2010 Ukrainian local elections: Party of Regions (61); Communist Party of Ukraine (10); Strong Ukraine (2); Front for Change (2); Ukraine – Forward! (1)
- Length of term: 5 years

Elections
- Last election: October 31, 2010
- Next election: Unscheduled (due to Russian occupation)

Meeting place
- 14 Kotsiubinsk Street, Luhansk, Ukraine; 48°34′15″N 39°17′52″E

Luhansk City Council (Ukrainian: Луганська міська рада) is the municipal council governing the Ukrainian city of Luhansk. The council has been de facto suspended since 2014 due to the War in Donbas and the resulting Russian occupation.

== History ==
=== 2010 election results ===
On October 31, Luhansk City Council took part in the 2010 Ukrainian local elections, and the results as follows:

- Party of Regions: 80.3%, 61 seats
- Communist Party of Ukraine: 13.2%, 10 seats
- Strong Ukraine: 2.6%, 2 seats
- Front for Change: 2.6%, 2 seats
- Ukraine – Forward! 1.3%, 1 seat

=== Suspension ===
In April 2014, pro-Russian separatists declared the creation of the Luhansk People's Republic. By September, Separatist forces gained control over the city and nearby areas as Ukrainian forces withdrew. Since then, the city council has been de facto suspended as Ukrainian forces do not control the city.
