= State University of Intellectual Technologies and Communications =

Public university in Odesa, Ukraine

Coordinates: 46.4825°N 30.7234°E

- ДЗВО «Державний університет інтелектуальних технологій і зв'язку»
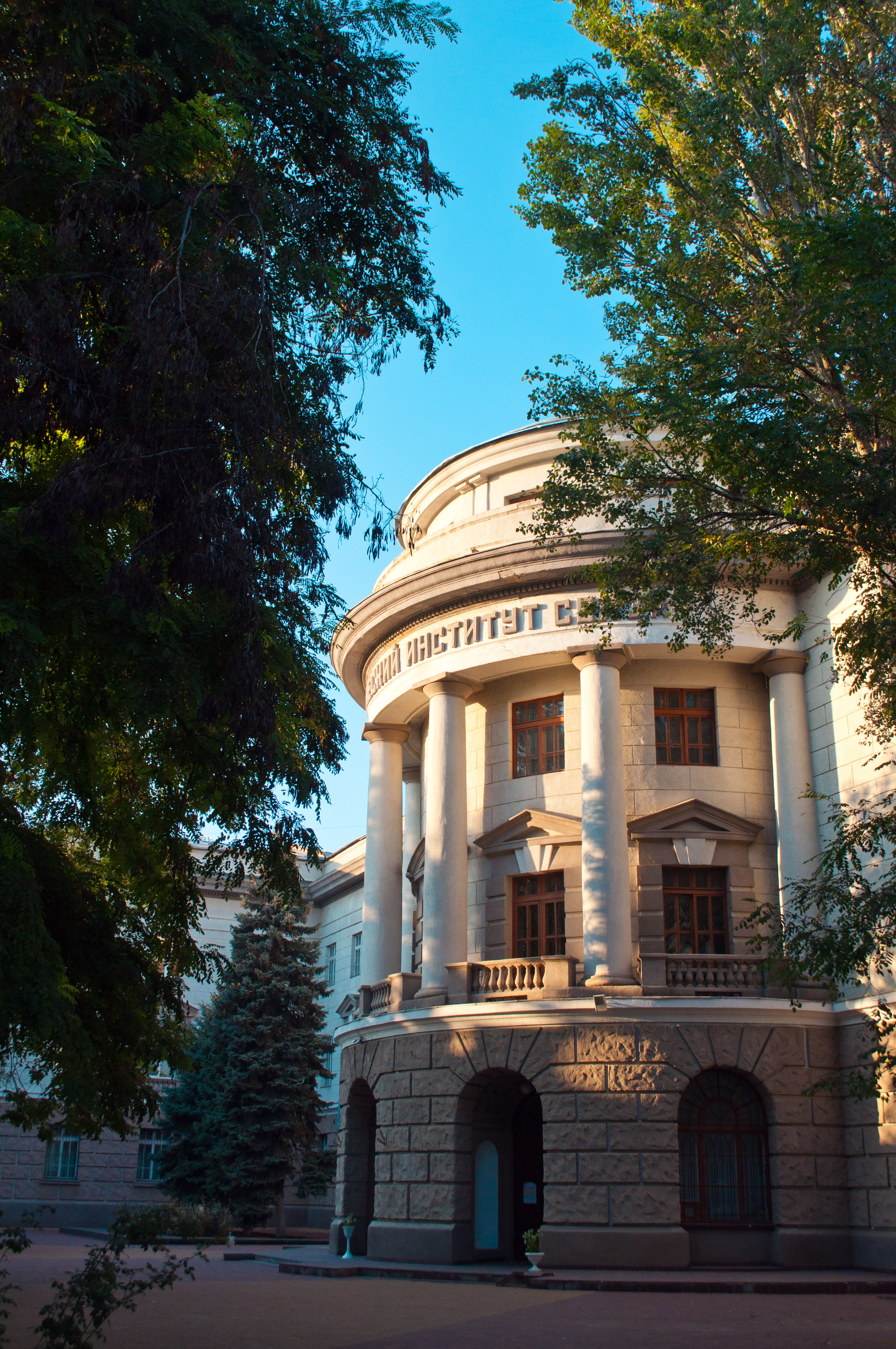
- Former names: O.S. Popov Odesa National Academy of Telecommunications
- Established: 1930
- Affiliations: Ministry of Education and Science of Ukraine
- Rector: Oleksandr Nazarenko
- Students: 7,395
- Location: Odesa, Ukraine
- Website: suitt.edu.ua
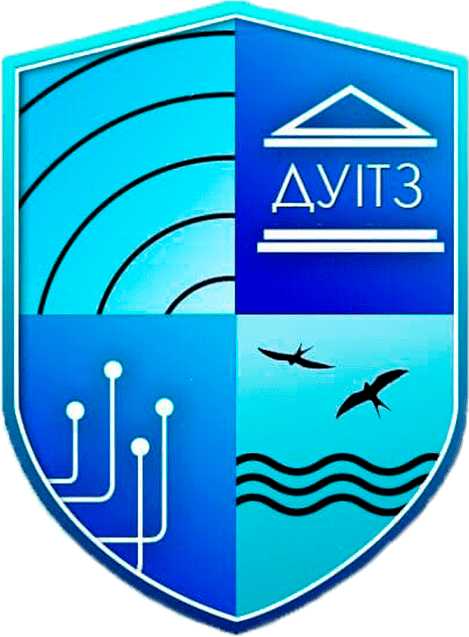

University rankings

Regional – Overall
- QS Emerging Europe and Central Asia: 401-450 (2022)

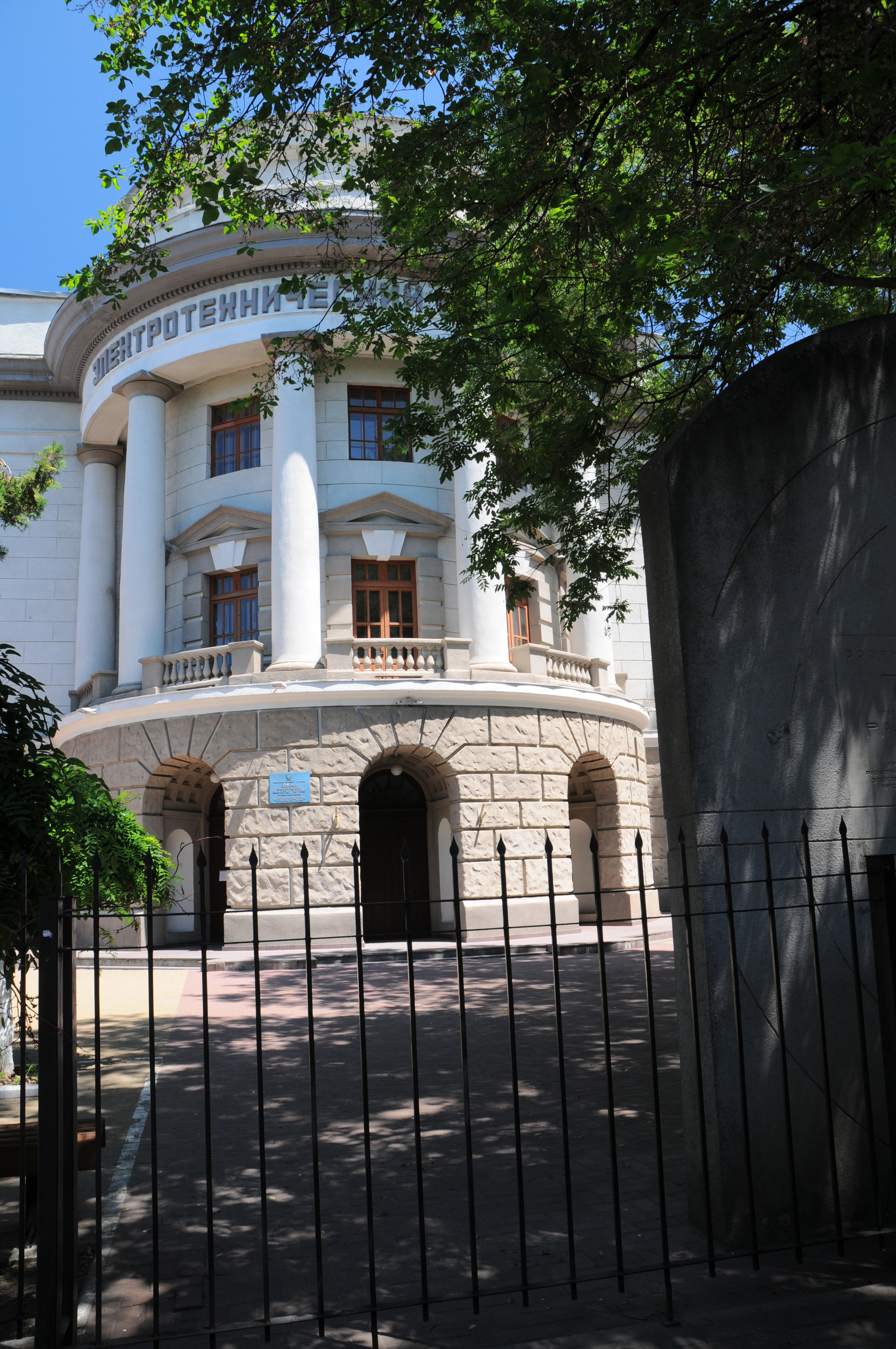

The State University of Intellectual Technologies and Communications (Ukrainian: Державний університет інтелектуальних технологій і зв'язку) is a public university in the city of Odesa, Ukraine.

== Faculty ==
The faculty consists of 465 teachers. The staff consists of 44 professors with a Doctorate of Science and 328 PhDs in fields with recognition from the Academics of Branch Academies, Laureates of State International Awards, Honored Statesmen of Science and Techniques and workers of the Ukrainian Higher School.

== Facilities ==
Today, more than 7,000 students are studying at the academy. The academy has a brainstorm experimental base and close ties with IT and telecommunication organizations. The educational process and scientific research takes place primarily in specialized labs.

== Organization ==
The academy is structured into six departments:

- Scientific Research Institute of Information Communication;
- Educational and Scientific Institute of Radio and Television Electronics;
- Computer Technologies, Automation, and Logistics, Educational and Research Institute;
- Educational and Scientific Institute of Economics and Management;
- Educational and Scientific Institute of Problems of Information Society;
- Department of Telecommunications Systems.

== See also ==
List of universities in Ukraine
