= Foreign Intelligence Service of Ukraine =

Foreign intelligence agency of Ukraine

Foreign Intelligence Service, Ukraine
- Служба Зовнішньої Розвідки України; Sluzhba zovnishn’oyi rozvidky Ukrayiny
- Emblem of the Service

- Flag of the Service

Agency overview
- Formed: October 14, 2004
- Preceding agencies: The First Headquarters of the National Security Service; National Security Service Intelligence Headquarters; The General Headquarters of Intelligence of the Security Service of Ukraine (SSU); Intelligence Department of the Security Service of Ukraine
- Jurisdiction: Government of Ukraine
- Headquarters: 24/1, Nahirna Street, Kyiv
- Employees: 4,000
- Agency executive: Rustem Umerov, FISU Head
- Parent agency: President of Ukraine
- Child agency: Institute of FISU (educational)
- Website: Official website

The Foreign Intelligence Service of Ukraine (Ukrainian: Служба зовнішньої розвідки України, romanized: Sluzhba zovnishn’oyi rozvidky Ukrayiny; SZRU), or FISU, is an intelligence agency of the Ukrainian government. It carries out its intelligence activities in political, economic, military, scientific, technical information and ecological spheres and reports directly to the President of Ukraine.

The Constitution of Ukraine, the Act of Ukraine on Intelligence Bodies and other norms and regulations of Ukraine are the principal guidance for the Foreign Intelligence Service's activities.

== History ==
On 27 January 1919 the Ukrainian People's Republic (UNR) set up the country's first foreign intelligence agency, the Department of Political Affairs of the Ministry of Internal Affairs of the Directory of the Ukrainian People's Republic. Following the defeat of the UNR and the incorporation of Ukraine into the Soviet Union, the agency was used to gather information about the general situation in Soviet Ukraine, and the selection and training agents, residents and couriers. During this period the military special service of the UNR-in-exile sometimes worked in close contact with intelligence agencies from other countries—mainly Romania, Japan, France, and the United Kingdom. Poland hosted and cooperated the most with UNR's foreign intelligence agency in exile in the 1920s and 1930s. The "Day of Foreign Intelligence of Ukraine" has been honoured on 27 January each year since 2019.

The modern-day Foreign Intelligence Service of Ukraine (FISU) started its activity on 14 October 2004, the day when the President of Ukraine, Leonid Kuchma, signed the Decree "On the Foreign Intelligence Service of Ukraine". Since then, created on the basis of the Intelligence Department of the Chief Directorate of Intelligence for the SBU, it has been functioning as an independent state body. On 1 December 2005 the Verkhovna Rada of Ukraine approved the Law "On the Foreign Intelligence Service of Ukraine". Later it was decided to celebrate on that day the anniversary of creation of the Foreign Intelligence Service of Ukraine.

The FISU was formed to meet principal demands of the Service. It comprises operative, analytical, technical, research and development departments, as well as elements of legal support, human resources, logistics and administration. The FISU Institute is responsible for initial training and refresher courses training of foreign intelligence officers. The FISU is directly subordinated to the President of Ukraine, who appoints the Chairman of the Service.

The FISU cooperates with other intelligence bodies of Ukraine, state authorities, institutions, establishments, as well as organizations, and law enforcement agencies. The FISU has established official contacts and maintained partnership relations with more than 100 foreign special services as well as with the NATO Office of Security. Today the primary issue of Ukrainian foreign policy involves enhancing cooperation with such international organizations as NATO and the European Union. In particular, within the frameworks of the EU-Ukraine integration program, the FISU participates in actions aimed at combating terrorism, countering organized crime, monitoring illegal migration, eliminating drug trafficking, and human trafficking.

According to the Constitution, the FISU operates under direction of the President of Ukraine and the Defense and Security Council of Ukraine, it is also under supervision of the Verkhovna Rada (the Supreme Council of Ukraine). The Accounting Chamber of Ukraine monitors budget expenditures on FISU maintenance. The General Prosecutor of Ukraine and authorized officials provide law enforcement of FISU activities.

The development of the organization as an independent structure and elaboration of legal underpinning for the FISU are coupled with the Service's routine work. This process engages settlement of key issues concerning legal and economic support, and personnel management on both state and institutional levels. To meet demands of democratic states the FISU has made a first step towards reformation of Ukrainian law enforcement agencies. The Service has gained the status of an independent state body and it has been detached from law enforcement agency. The FISU is caring out its practical actions in the context of world tendency towards strengthening intelligence in the security support systems, and enhancing drastically the overall information. The improvement of intelligence direction and control system is aimed at enhancing Service ability to disrupt external threats that may affect the Ukrainian national security, as well as at raising its preparedness to provide an immediate response to hostile actions. An issue of key importance is ensuring impossibility of exploiting foreign intelligence for the purposes not determined within the laws of Ukraine. Another major factor of the Service reorganization is creating effective and democratic control system over the FISU activities.

The recent dramatic changes in the world as well as in Ukraine have made the FISU elaborate new approaches of its further activities including Ukrainian reformation process, its various initiatives in the sphere of reorganization of entire state system, elimination of duplication in state bodies functions, responses to possible threats in the sphere of national defense. Besides, the FISU exerts every effort to adapt its structure and activities to new challenges which Ukraine faces on its road to a gradual integration into the European Union and the North Atlantic Treaty Organization and to enhance cooperation with neighboring and other countries in the field of regional and global security.

On December 16, 2010, FISU and the "Yaroslaviv Val" publishing house presented a book Leaders of the Ukrainian Foreign Intelligence. The book uncovers information about intelligence agents of the Soviet Ukraine as well as Ukraine of 1918–1920.

In December 2024, Ukrainian President Volodymyr Zelenskyy approved the new flag and emblem of the FISU.

== Mission ==
The original missions of the SZRU as follows:

- collecting, evaluating, analyzing and disseminate intelligence to the heads of the highest decision-making bodies of Ukraine in accordance with the applicable law;
- implementing special measures to further state policy of Ukraine in political, economic, military and technical, ecological and information spheres, as well as to contribute to national defense, foster economic development, and promote science and technology;
- safeguarding Ukrainian missions abroad, providing security to the staff and their family members in the host country as well as attached officers who have access to data of state secret;
- participating in international operations addressing such high-priority issues as organized crime, terrorism, drug trafficking, illegal trade of arms and respective technologies, and illegal migration;
- providing counter measures to external threats that can affect National security of Ukraine, lives and health of its citizens, and state establishments abroad.

== Directors ==
- Heorhiy Kovtun – December 1991 – December 1992
- Oleksandr Sharkov – January 1993 – July 1995
- Viacheslav Abramov – July 1995 – December 1998
- Leonid Rozhen – February 1999 – November 2000
- Oleksandr Cherevan – December 2000–June 2003
- Oleh Synianskyi – November 2003 – 3 April 2005
- Mykola Malomuzh – 3 April 2005 – 18 June 2010 (Note: On June 19, 2010 TV-channel Inter informed that Malomuzh who was relieved of his duties as the chair of the service earlier was appointed as the Presidential adviser by the order № 714/2010.)
- Hryhoriy Illyashov – 18 June 2010 – 26 February 2014
- Viktor Hvozd – 27 February 2014 – 29 April 2016
- Yehor Bozhok – 13 September 2017 – 14 March 2019
- Vladyslav Bukhariev – 11 June 2019 – 11 September 2019
- Valeriy Yevdokimov – 20 September 2019 – 4 June 2020
- Valeriy Kondratyuk – 5 June 2020 – 23 July 2021
- Oleksandr Lytvynenko – 23 July 2021 – 26 March 2024
- Oleh Ivashchenko – 26 March 2024 – 2 January 2026
- Oleksandr Kononenko – 2 January 2026 – 4 February 2026
- Oleh Luhovsky – 4 February 2026 – 3 August 2026
- Rustem Umerov – From 3 August 2026

== Long Service medal ==
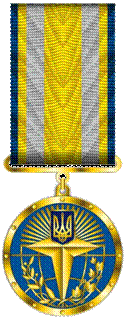
25 years in service

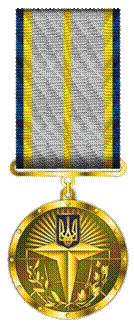
20 years in service

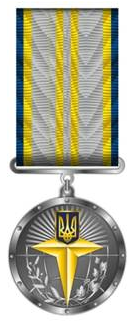
15 years in service

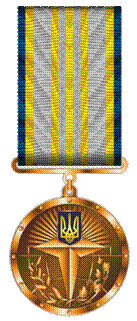
10 years in service
