= Mayor of Luhansk =

The following is a list of mayors of the city of Luhansk, Ukraine. It includes positions equivalent to mayor, such as chairperson of the city council executive committee.

== Mayors ==
- Mykola Petrovych Kholodylin, 1883–1891
- Volodymyr Ivanovych Verbovskyi, 1891–1902
- Stefan Klimentiyovych Lutovinov, 1902–1908
- Mykola Oleksandrovych Gryazev, 1908–1909
- Ivan Ivanovych Nikolayev, 1909–1912
- Feodul Petrovych Sidorov, 1912
- Stefan Klimentiyovych Lutovinov, 1912–1914
- Ivan Ivanovych Kholodylin, 1914–1915
- Mykola Sergeyevich Vasnev, 1915–1917
- Oleksandr Ivanovych Chervyakov, 1917
- Fedir Vasyliovych Lyubomudrov, 1919
- Danilovsky, 1919
- Hryhoriy Mykhailovych Rymskyi-Korsakov (Larin), 1917
- Mykhailo Abramovich Weil, 1917
- Ivan Mykolayovych Nahykh, 1917
- Anton Yakovych Nesterov, 1917
- Oleksandr Vasyliovych Makarov, 1917
- Kliment Yefremovich Voroshilov, 1917
- Pylyp Ustinovych Voronin, 1917–1918
- Zinovy Fedorovych Lyapin, 1918–1920
- Semen Pavlovych Popov, 1918-1919
- Mykola Gordiyovych Myshkov, 1919–1924
- Ivan Hnatovych Nikolayenko, 1919
- Ivan Dormydontovych Vershyn, 1920, 1923–1925
- Volodymyr Yudovych Kudrych, 1920
- Kutuzov, 1920–1921
- Ivan Stepanovych Zhukov, 1921
- Rudenko, 1925
- Ivan Illich Aleksyeyev, 1925–1926
- Mykola Hryhorovych Tretyakov, 1926–1927
- Mykhailo Martynovych Polukhov, 1927
- Ivan Semenovych Holyapin, 1927–1929
- Oleksandr Fedorovych Dovbysh, 1930–1931
- Petro Yukhimovych Karpenko, 1931–1932
- Mykola Fyodorovych Polyanskyi, 1932–1933
- Stanislav Martynovych Levandovskyi, 1933
- Kostyantyn Omelyanovych Volevach, 1933–1934
- Prokop Andreyovych Hudkov, 1934–1937
- Pavlo Ilyich Puzanov, 1937
- Petro Ivanovych Bohynya, 1937–1938
- Andriy Yosypovych Novikov, 1938
- Kyrylo Mykolayovych Simankov, 1938–1939
- Petro Yakovych Zverev, 1939–1944
- Oleksandr Andriyovych Hryb, 1944–1946
- V. Zheltetskyi, 1946
- Pavlo Fedotovich Vorobyov, 1946–1947
- Fedir Volodymyrovych Yenenko, 1947
- Pylyp Serhiyovych Hachko, 1948–1950
- Konstantin Ivanovich Strepetov, 1950–1960
- Ilya Georgiyovych Lekhtsiev, 1960–1965
- Georgiy Semenovych Petrov, 1965–1985
- Yuri Pavlovich Petrov, 1985–1987
- Volodymyr Pantyukhin, 1987–1991

=== Ukraine ===
- Volodymyr Pantyukhin, 1990–1994
- Oleksiy Danilov, 1994–1997
- Anatoliy Parapanov, 1997–1998
- Anatoliy Yahoferov, 1998–2001
- Volodymyr Prystyuk, 2001–2002
- Yevhen Burlachenko, 2002–2006
- Serhiy Kravchenko, 2006–2014

=== Luhansk People's Republic ===
- Manolis Pilavov, 2014–2023
- Yana Pashchenko 2023–present

== See also ==
- Luhansk history
- Timeline of Luhansk (in Ukrainian)
