= East Ukrainian National University =

National university in Luhansk and Kyiv, Ukraine

Coordinates: 48.5654°N 39.3787°E

Volodymyr Dahl East Ukrainian National University
- Східноукраїнський національний університет імені Володимира Даля
- Type: National university
- Established: 1920
- Affiliations: Ministry of Education and Science of Ukraine
- Academic affiliations: IAU
- Rector: Olha Porkuian
- Administrative staff: --
- Students: 34,000 (pre-conflict numbers)
- Location: Luhansk and Kyiv, Ukraine
- Website: snu.edu.ua

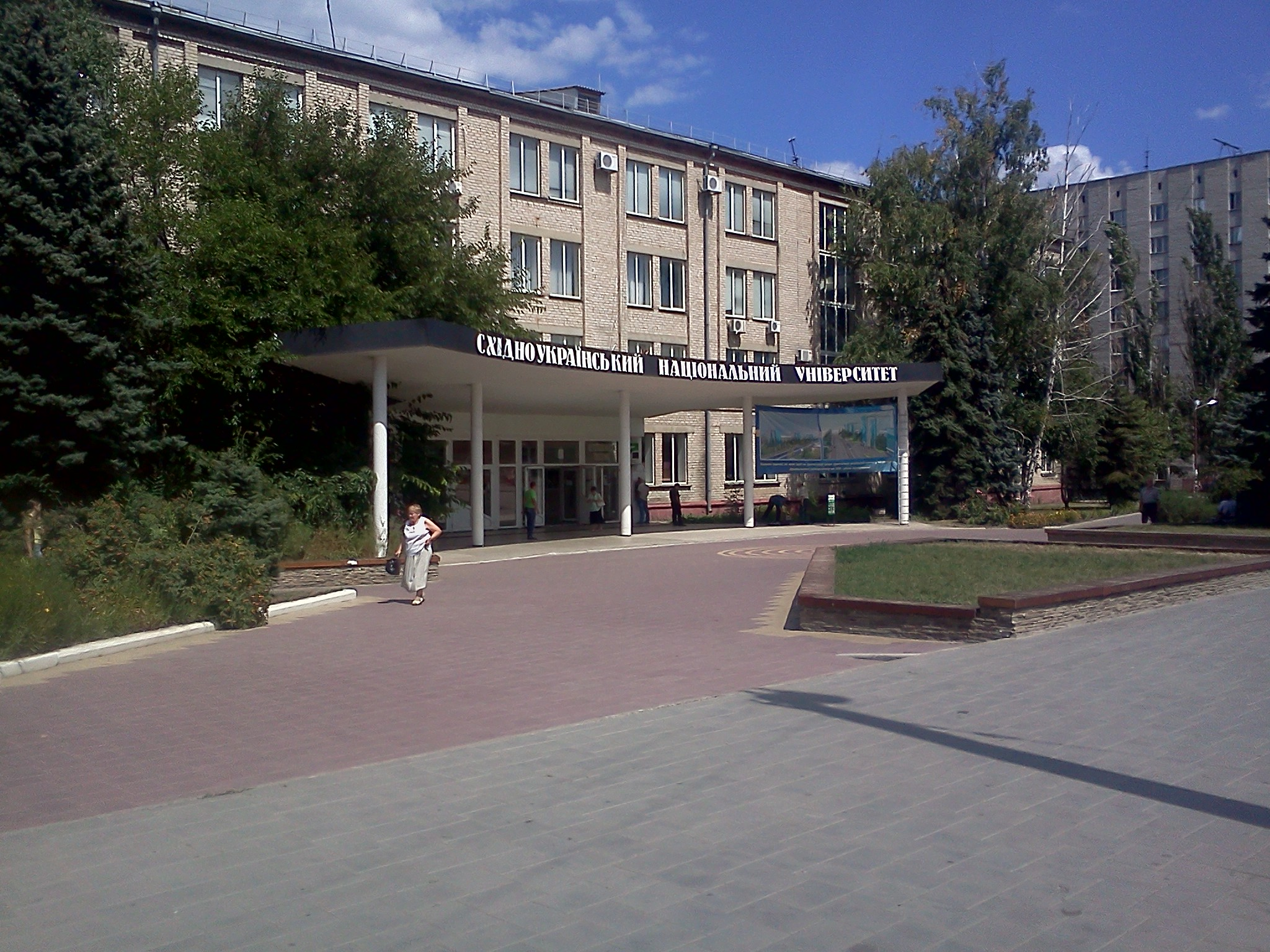
East Ukraine University First building

The Volodymyr Dahl East Ukrainian National University (Ukrainian: Східноукраїнський національний університет імені Володимира Даля, abbr. СНУ ім.В.Даля) is a state-sponsored university in Ukraine. It was founded in 1920, and in 1991 it was named after Volodymyr Dahl. It was the first higher educational establishment in which specialists in machine-building were trained. During World War II the institute was evacuated to Omsk (Russia). There it became the basis for the foundation of Omsk State Technical University.

Besides branches in Luhansk the university has branches in other Ukrainian cities (Sievierodonetsk, Rubizhne, Krasnodon, Antratsyt, Livadiya in Luhansk Oblast, Feodosiya, Yevpatoriya in Crimea and Skadovsk in Kherson Oblast).

Nowadays the university has level IV accreditation, with 24 faculties and nearly 1,083 professors, 742 of them PhD's. The university owns 55 buildings in east and south (Crimea) Ukraine University has about 34,000 Ukrainian (and about 260 foreign) students and offers 124 majors. It used to be the largest machine-building institute in the former USSR.

In 2001, the university was named after Vladimir Dal (who is called Volodymyr Dahl in Ukrainian).

Since September 2014, two institutions claim to represent this university: one, that remains in Luhansk, and the other that says that university was evacuated from Luhansk to Sievierodonetsk due to the Russo-Ukrainian War. After the start of Russian occupation of Sievierodonetsk, this university was relocated to Kyiv.

== Structure ==
Some of the 24 faculties of the university include:

- Construction Engineering
- Automobiles
- Accounting and Auditing
- Electromechanics
- Railway Transport
- Internal Combustion Engines
- Computer Sciences
- Labour Safety and Life Security
- Archival Studies
- Journalism
- Politology
- Sociology
- Physical Education
- Administration
- Management
- Foreign-Economic Activity Management
- Metal Cutting Machine-Tools and Instruments
- Chair of Electronic Industry Equipment
- Physics
- Chemistry
- Economic Cybernetics
- Marketing
- Personnel Management and Economics Theory
- Foreign Languages
- Pedagogics
- Foreign Language Skills Development
- Human Problems and Philosophy of Health
- Psychology
- Religions
- Banking
- Taxation
- World History
- History of Ukraine

== See also ==
List of universities in Ukraine
